= List of United States post offices in Iowa =

United States post offices operate under the authority of the United States Post Office Department (1792–1971) or the United States Postal Service (since 1971). Historically, post offices were usually placed in a prominent location. Many were architecturally distinctive, including notable buildings featuring Beaux-Arts, Art Deco, and Vernacular architecture. However, modern U.S. post offices were generally designed for functionality rather than architectural style.

Following is a list of United States post offices in Iowa. Notable post offices include individual buildings, whether still in service or not, which have architectural, historical, or community-related significance. Many of these are listed on the National Register of Historic Places (NRHP) or state and local historic registers.

Post office	City	Date built	Image	Architect	Notes	Ref.
United States Post Office (Algona, Iowa)	Algona	1936		John Winthrop Wolcott Jr.	(Note: No longer used as a post office.)	
United States Post Office (Ames, Iowa)	Ames	1935			(Note: Houses the New Deal muralThe Evolution of Corn by Lowell Houser.)	
United States Post Office (Anamosa, Iowa)	Anamosa	1940		Louis A. Simon		
United States Post Office (Audubon, Iowa)	Audubon	1940–1941			(Note: Houses the New Deal mural Audubon’s Trip down the Ohio and Mississippi—1820 by Virginia Snedeker.)	
United States Post Office (Bloomfield, Iowa)	Bloomfield	1937–1938			(Note: Houses the New Deal mural Autumn in Iowa by John Sharp.)	
Cedar Rapids Post Office and Public Building	Cedar Rapids	1908		Taylor McAlpin, James Knox Taylor	(Note: Listed on the National Register of Historic Places)	
United States Post Office (Centerville, Iowa)	Centerville	1904		James Knox Taylor		
United States Post Office (Clarion, Iowa)	Clarion	1939–1940			(Note: Houses the New Deal mural Farm Scene by Paul Faulkner.)	
United States Post Office (Clinton, Iowa)	Clinton	1902				
United States Post Office (Columbus Junction, Iowa)	Columbus Junction	1940–1941			(Note: Houses the New Deal mural Lover’s Leap by Sante Graziani.)	
United States Post Office (Corning, Iowa)	Corning	1938		Louis A. Simon	(Note: Houses the New Deal mural Band Concert by Marion Gilmore.)	
United States Post Office (Corydon, Iowa)	Corydon	1940			(Note: Houses the New Deal mural Volunteer Fire Department by Marion Gilmore.)	
United States Post Office (Cresco, Iowa)	Cresco	1935		Louis A. Simon, Neal A. Melick	(Note: Housed the New Deal mural Iowa Farming by Richard Haines.)	
United States Post Office (Creston, Iowa)	Creston	1901		James Knox Taylor		
United States Post Office and Court House, now the United States Courthouse (Davenport)	Davenport	1933		Seth J. Temple		
United States Post Office (Des Moines, Iowa)	Des Moines	1909–1910		James Knox Taylor		
Old Post Office, now DeWitt City Hall	DeWitt	1936			(Note: Houses the New Deal mural Shucking Corn by John V. Bloom.)	
United States Post Office (Eldora, Iowa)	Eldora	1939				
United States Post Office (Emmetsburg, Iowa)	Emmetsburg	1938–1939			(Note: Houses the New Deal mural Conservation of Wild Life by Lee Allen.)	
Former United States Post Office Building (Fairfield, Iowa)	Fairfield	1876		unknown		
United States Post Office (Forest City, Iowa)	Forest City	1940–1941		Louis A. Simon, Neal A. Melick	(Note: Houses the New Deal mural Evening on the Farm by Orr C. Fisher.)	
United States Post Office (Hamburg, Iowa)	Hamburg	1937–1938			(Note: Originally housed the New Deal mural Peony Festival at Hamburg by William E. L. Bunn, which was accidentally destroyed during the building's expansion in 1969.)	
United States Post Office (Hampton, Iowa)	Hampton	1934–1935				
United States Post Office (Harlan, Iowa)	Harlan	1935			(Note: Houses the New Deal mural The Farmer Feeding Industry by Richard Gates.)	
United States Post Office (Hawarden, Iowa)	Hawarden	1940–1941			(Note: Houses the New Deal mural Hunters by John Sharp.)	
United States Post Office (Ida Grove, Iowa)	Ida Grove	1938–1939			(Note: Houses the New Deal mural Preparation for the First County Fair in Ida Grove—1872 by Andrene J. Kauffman.)	
United States Post Office (Independence, Iowa)	Independence	1934–1935			(Note: Houses the New Deal mural Postman in Storm by Robert Tabor.)	
Old Post Office (Iowa City, Iowa)	Iowa City	1904		unknown		
United States Post Office (Iowa Falls, Iowa)	Iowa Falls	1914		Oscar Wenderoth		
United States Post Office (Jefferson, Iowa)	Jefferson	1936–1937			(Note: Houses the New Deal mural The New Calf by Tom Savage.)	
United States Post Office and Courthouse, now Lee County Courthouse (Keokuk, Iowa)	Keotuk	1887		Mifflin E. Bell		
United States Post Office (Knoxville, Iowa)	Knoxville	1939–1940			(Note: Houses the New Deal mural Pioneer Group at the Red Rock Line—1845 by Marvin Beerbohm.)	
United States Post Office (Leon, Iowa)	Leon	1936–1937			(Note: Houses the New Deal mural Rural Free Delivery by Criss Glasell.)	
United States Post Office (Manchester, Iowa)	Manchester	1936–1937			(Note: Houses the New Deal mural Iowa Farm Life by William E. Henning.)	
United States Post Office, later Marion City Hall	Marion	1937			(Note: Originally house the New Deal mural Communication by Mail by Dan Rhodes, now housed in the Marion Heritage Center & Museum.)	
United States Post Office (Missouri Valley, Iowa)	Missouri Valley	1936–1937			(Note: Houses the New Deal mural Iowa Fair by Francis Robert White.)	
United States Post Office (Monticello, Iowa)	Monticello	1939			(Note: Houses the New Deal triptych mural Iowa Landscape by William C. Palmer.)	
United States Post Office (Mount Ayr, Iowa)	Mount Ayr	1939–1940			(Note: Houses the New Deal mural The Corn Parade by Orr C. Fisher.)	
United States Post Office (Mount Pleasant, Iowa)	Mount Pleasant	1935–1936		Wyatt C. Hedrick	(Note: Houses a trio of New Deal murals by Dorothea Tomlinson.)	
United States Post Office (Nevada, Iowa)	Nevada	1937–1938				
United States Post Office (New Hampton, Iowa)	New Hampton	1937–1938			(Note: Houses the New Deal mural Breaking the Colt by Tom Savage.)	
United States Post Office (Onawa, Iowa)	Onawa	1936–1937			(Note: Houses the New Deal mural Soil Erosion and Control by Lee Allen.)	
United States Post Office (Osage, Iowa)	Osage	1934–1935				
United States Post Office (Osceola, Iowa)	Osceola	1935–1936			(Note: Houses the New Deal mural Arrival of the First Train by Byron B. Boyd.)	
United States Post Office (Ottumwa, Iowa), now Ottumwa City Hall	Ottumwa	1910–1912		James Knox Taylor		
United States Post Office (Pella, Iowa)	Pella	1936–1937			(Note: Houses the New Deal mural Hollanders Settle in Pella by Byron Ben Boyd.)	
United States Post Office (Rock Rapids, Iowa)	Rock Rapids	1937–1938				
United States Post Office (Rockwell City, Iowa)	Rockwell City			Louis A. Simon, Neal A. Melick	(Note: Houses the New Deal mural Summer by John Sharp.)	
United States Post Office (Sac City, Iowa)	Sac City	1935–1936				
United States Post Office (Sigourney, Iowa)	Sigourney	1937–1938			(Note: Houses the New Deal mural Indian Harvest by Richard Olsen.)	
Kegler Gonner Store and Post Office	Springbrook	1874		unknown		
United States Post Office (Tipton, Iowa)	Tipton	1937–1938		Louis A. Simon	(Note: Houses the New Deal mural Cattle by John V. Bloom.)	
Old Post Office and U.S. Courthouse, now Waterloo Public Library-East Side Branch	Waterloo	1905		John G. Ralston		
United States Post Office (Waukon, Iowa)	Waukon	1938				
United States Post Office (Waverly, Iowa)	Waverly	1936–1937			(Note: Houses the New Deal mural Letter from Home in 1856 by Mildred Pelzer.)	
Webster City Post Office	Webster City	1909		James Knox Taylor		
United States Post Office (West Union, Iowa)	West Union	1939–1940				
United States Post Office (Winterset, Iowa)	Winterset	1934–1935				
