= Old Waterville Post Office =

- Waterville Post Office
- U.S. National Register of Historic Places
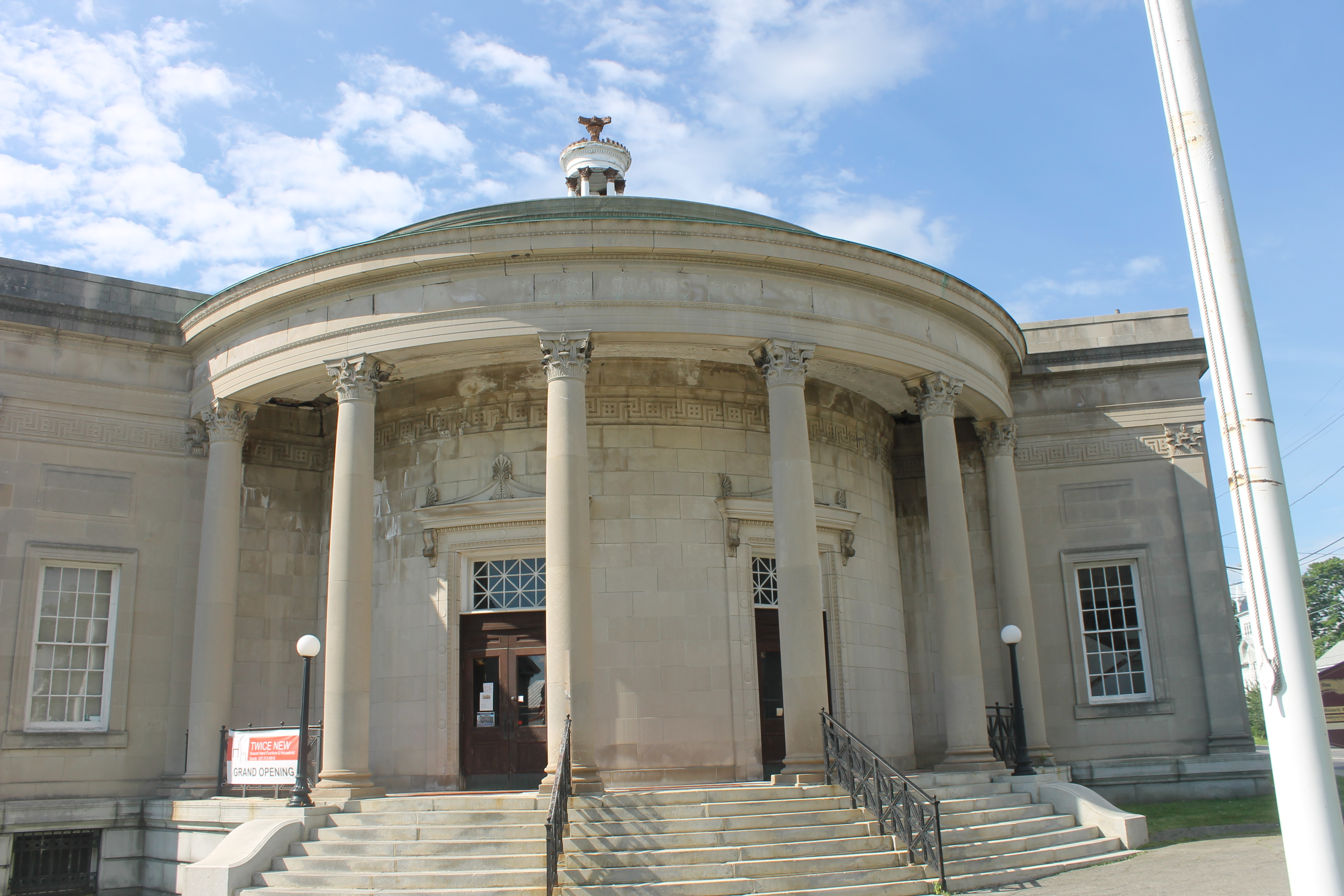

- Location within Maine Location within the United States
- Location: 1 Post Office Sq., Waterville, Maine
- Coordinates: 44°33′8″N 69°37′54″W
- Area: 0.5 acres (0.20 ha)
- Built: 1911
- Architect: Taylor, James Knox
- Architectural style: Greek Revival
- NRHP reference No.: 77000074
- Added to NRHP: April 18, 1977

The Old Waterville Post Office is a historic post office facility at 1 Post Office Square in central Waterville, Maine. Built in 1911, it is a fine local example of institutional Greek Revival architecture. It was listed on the National Register of Historic Places in 1977, and presently houses a restaurant and brewpub.

== Description and history ==
The Old Waterville Post Office stands prominently on a triangular parcel of land formed by Main and Elm Streets at the northern end of Waterville's commercial business district. It is a single-story masonry structure, in the form of a bent rectangle, presenting secondary facades to the two roads. Facing toward their intersection is a rounded projection, fronted by a colonnade of Corinthian columns supporting an entablature. The building corners have Corinthian pilasters, supporting continuations of the entablature around the building. The rounded section is covered by a circular domed roof section topped by a lantern structure designed in emulation of the Choragic Monument of Lysicrates, while the remainder of the building roof is flat. A low flight of stairs rises to the two main entrances in the curved section, set in elaborate surrounds with bracketed entablatures.

The post office was designed by James Knox Taylor, then head of the Office of the Supervising Architect of the United States Treasury Department, and was completed in 1911. It is one of the state's finest examples of Greek Revival architecture from the early 20th century.

== See also ==
- National Register of Historic Places listings in Kennebec County, Maine
- List of United States post offices
