= Kegler Gonner Store and Post Office =

- U.S. National Register of Historic Places
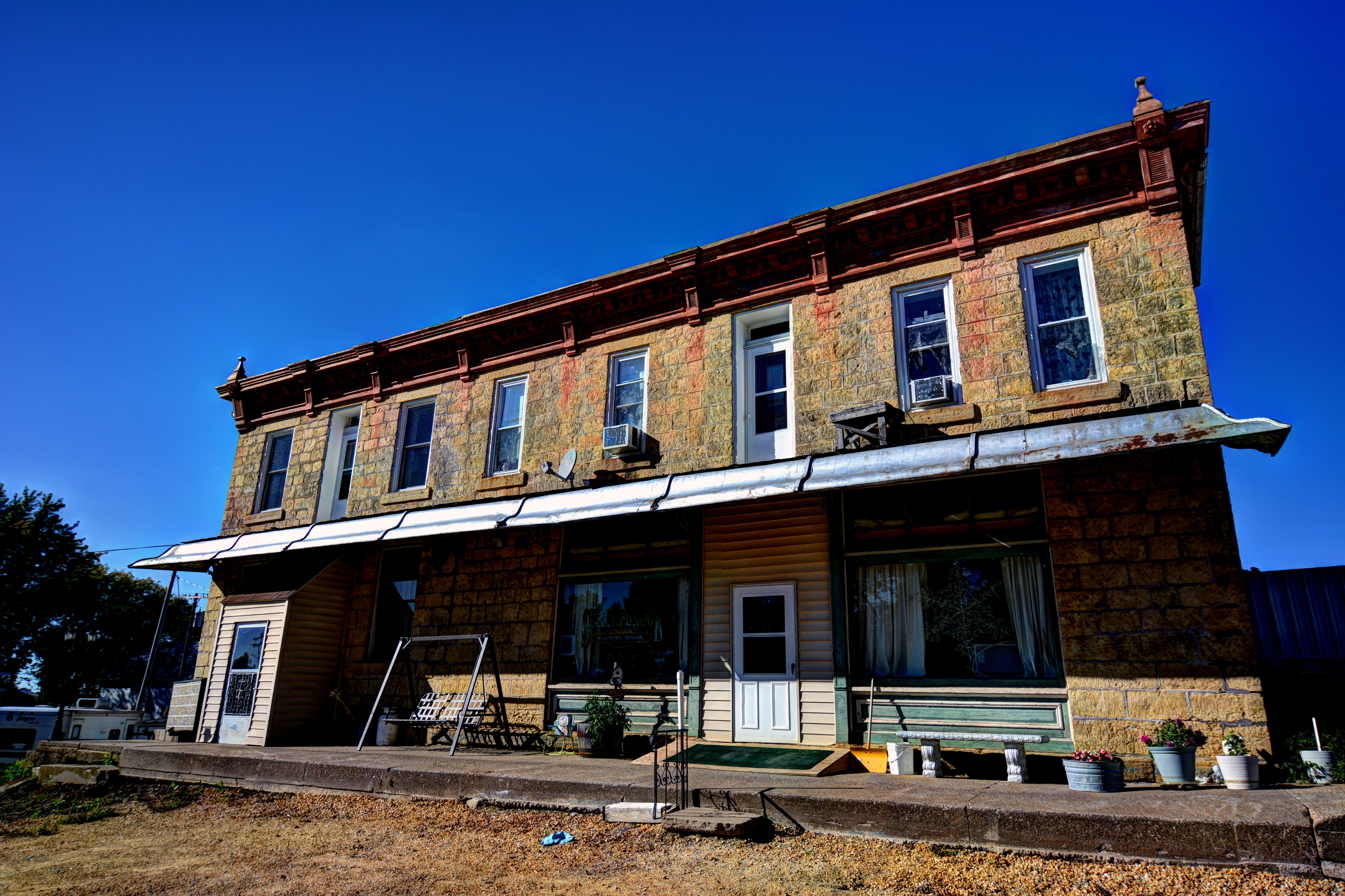

- Location within Iowa Location within the United States
- Location: 100 E. Main; Springbrook, Iowa
- Coordinates: 42°09′51″N 90°28′36″W
- Area: less than one acre
- Built: 1874
- Built by: Peter and John Weis
- Architectural style: Vernacular
- NRHP reference No.: 85001375
- Added to NRHP: June 27, 1985

The Kegler-Gonner Store and Post Office, also known simply as Gonner's Store, is a historic commercial building located in Springbrook, Iowa, United States. Christian Kegler had the western portion of this building constructed around 1874 for his general store. The post office had relocated to this site two years earlier, with Kegler serving as the postmaster. Over time, three additions were made to the original structure, and the building reached its final form by 1933.

In 1904, John Gonner bought a stake in the store and by 1908, he owned it entirely. The building continued to be known as Gonner's Store at least into the mid-1980s. Today, a restaurant occupies the space, and apartments are located on the second floor. The east side of the second level once used as a boarding house.

The building is notable for its construction from coursed ashlar limestone, with stones of various sizes. The tin cornice that caps the main facade features finials, brackets, dentils, and modillion trims. A balcony and a tin awning runs the entire front of the building. The western portion of the building is capped by a hip roof, while the eastern section is capped with a gable roof. Local stonemasons Peter and John Weis were believed to have constructed the original structure.

The Kegler-Gonner Store and Post Office was listed on the National Register of Historic Places in 1985.

== See also ==
- List of United States post offices
