= Beverly Depot–Odell Park Historic District =

Historic district in Massachusetts, United States

- U.S. National Register of Historic Places
- U.S. Historic district
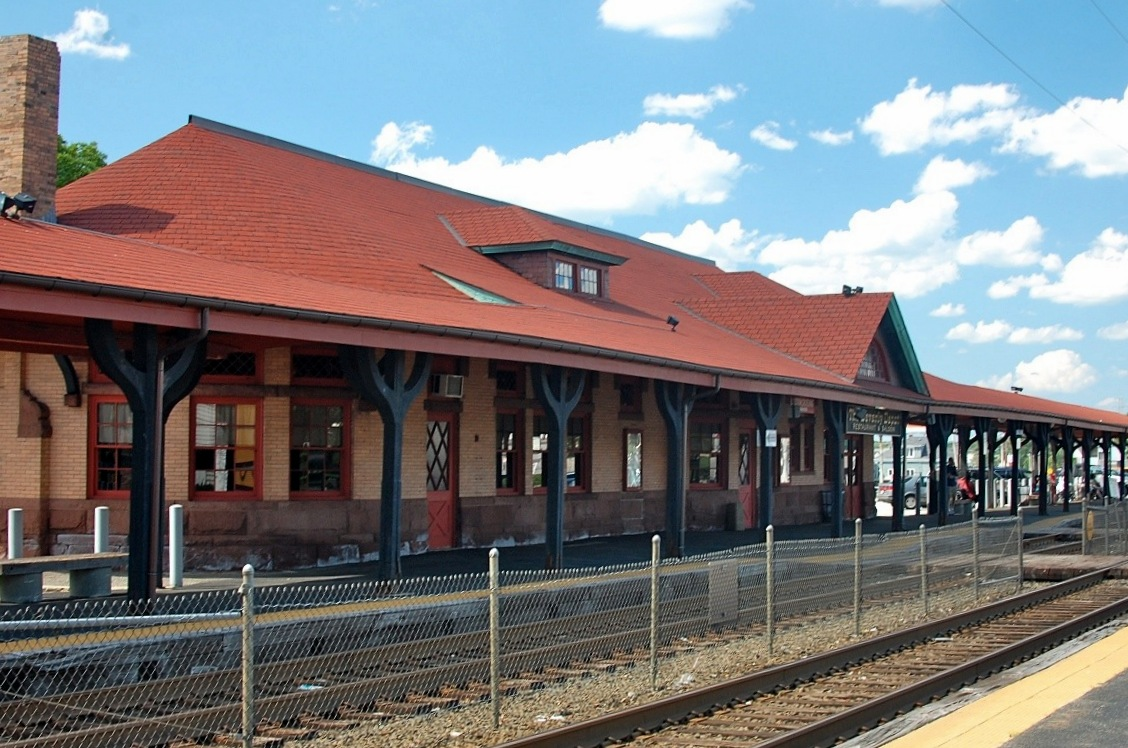
- Beverly Depot

- Location within Massachusetts Location within the United States
- Location: Beverly, Massachusetts
- Coordinates: 42.547129°N 70.884606°W
- NRHP reference No.: 13001056
- Added to NRHP: January 8, 2014

The Beverly Depot–Odell Park Historic District encompasses a commercial and industrial area of Beverly, Massachusetts that was developed to its height in the late 19th and early 20th centuries. A central theme of the district relates to Beverly's transportation history with several railroad-related buildings, a carriage manufactory and early automobile factory. The district, listed on the National Register of Historic Places in 2014, include two buildings previously listed: the Beverly Depot, built 1896, and the main post office, built 1910.

== Controversy ==
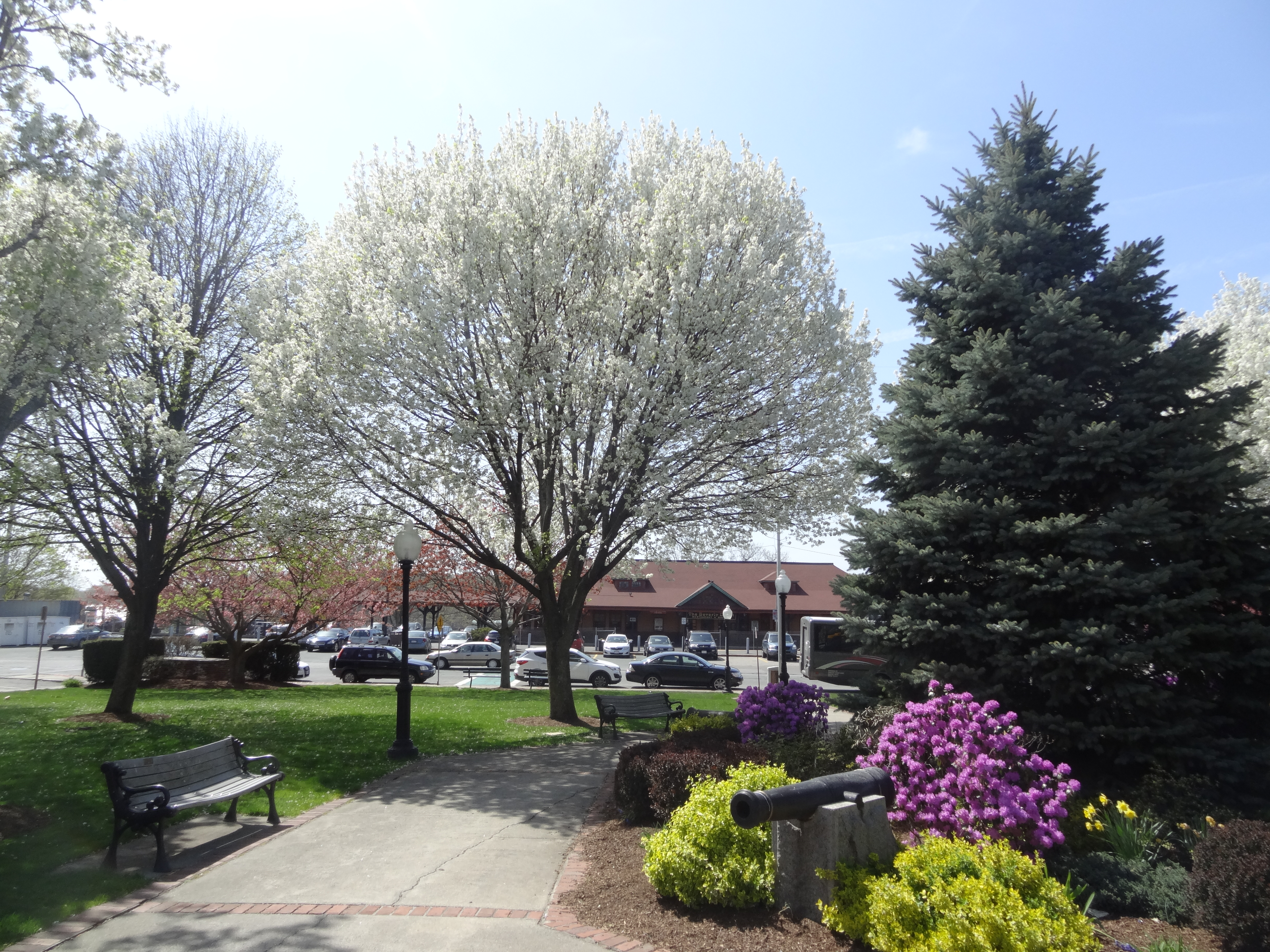
Odell Park looking toward Beverly Depot

The district was nominated to the National Register by Windover Development in order to receive $2 million in tax credits for their renovation of the former Friend Box Factory at 60 Pleasant Street into veterans housing. As the nomination was being reviewed by the Massachusetts Historical Commission, Windover Development planned to demolish two of the buildings (the former Cushing Carriage Factory at 142 Rantoul Street and the former Hotel Trafton at 9 Park Street) for the construction of a new apartment building. Both properties were placed on a one-year demolition delay by the Beverly Historic Commission on January 31, 2013. In a letter to Windover Development, the Massachusetts Historical Commission stated the Beverly Depot–Odell Park Historic District would no longer be eligible for listing in the National Register of Historic Places if these two key buildings were demolished.

A collection of brick buildings belonging to National Grid were included in the original nomination of the district; all but one were demolished in February 2013.

In April 2019, Beverly Crossing (formerly Windover Development) announced plans to demolish three of the buildings in the district to build a new apartment building, claiming that the structures would be too expensive to renovate. Residents accused the company of hypocrisy for using the buildings' historic status for the tax credits, then proposing to demolish them.

== See also ==
- National Register of Historic Places listings in Essex County, Massachusetts
