= Court Avenue Bridge =

- U.S. National Register of Historic Places
- U.S. Historic district – Contributing property
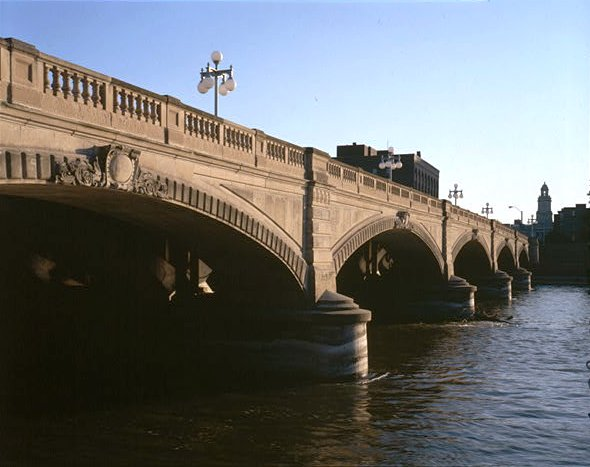

- Location within Iowa Location within the United States
- Location: Court Ave. over the Des Moines River, Des Moines, Iowa
- Coordinates: 41°35′09″N 93°37′03″W
- Built: 1917-1918
- Architect: James B. Marsh
- Part of: Civic Center Historic District (ID88001168)
- MPS: Highway Bridges of Iowa MPS
- NRHP reference No.: 98000489
- Added to NRHP: May 15, 1998

The Court Avenue Bridge is a historic structure located in downtown Des Moines, Iowa, United States. It became a contributing property in the Civic Center Historic District in 1988, and was individually listed on the National Register of Historic Places on May 15, 1998 as a part of the Highway Bridges of Iowa MPS.

== History ==
The first bridge across the Des Moines River at Court Avenue was a toll bridge that was built from 1857 to 1858 under the direction of architect Uriah Burr White. It was the first permanent bridge over the river in the city of Des Moines. Legislators using the bridge in order to get to the capitol building were given passes. The bridge was composed of four spans with double trusses and double arches. It was replaced in 1870 by a Post truss bridge that lasted until at least 1898. The current bridge is believed to be its replacement when it built from 1917 to 1918.

The present Court Avenue Bridge is the third of the six current bridges in the Civic Center district to be constructed. The Walnut Street Bridge was built in 1911 and the Locust Street Bridge was built in 1907. Both of the earlier bridges were reconstructed in the 1960s and their original ornamentation was removed at the time. The Court Avenue Bridge was designed by architect James B. Marsh.

During a renovation of the bridge in 1982, the bridge deck was replaced and the supporting spans were preserved and rehabilitated. Repairs were made using existing materials and replacement materials were used only when necessary and were matched with the originals as closely as possible. Street lamps with round globes and metal work that reflected the 1910s were added to the bridge in 1986 as a part of a $1.8 million project to refurbish Court Avenue between the bridge and the Polk County Courthouse.

== See also ==
- List of bridges documented by the Historic American Engineering Record in Iowa
