= United States Post Office (Johnstown, New York) =

- US Post Office-Johnstown
- U.S. National Register of Historic Places
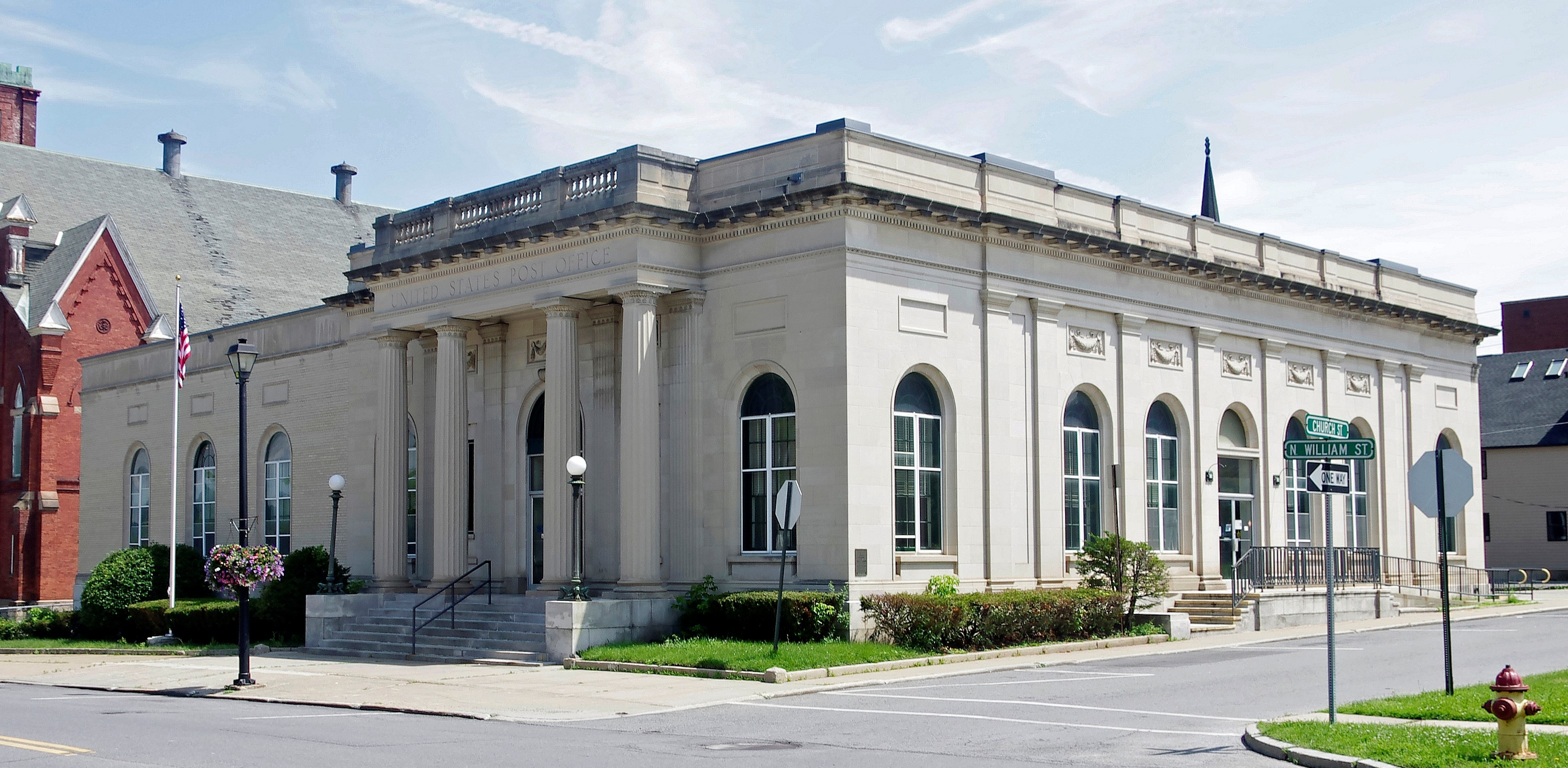
- (2013)

- Location within New York Location within the United States
- Location: 14 N. William St., Johnstown, New York
- Coordinates: 43°0′26″N 74°22′27″W
- Built: 1913
- Architect: James Knox Taylor
- Architectural style: Classical Revival
- MPS: US Post Offices in New York State, 1858–1943, TR
- NRHP reference No.: 88002337
- Added to NRHP: May 11, 1989

The US Post Office-Johnstown is a historic post office building located at 14 North William Street in Johnstown, Fulton County, New York. It was designed and built in 1912–1913, and is one of a number of post offices in New York State designed by the Office of the Supervising Architect of the Treasury Department, James Knox Taylor. It was enlarged in 1965–1966. The original section is a five-by-seven-bay, 1-story limestone structure on a granite foundation in the Classical Revival style. The entrance portico features four Doric order columns supporting an entablature. The building also features semi-circular arched windows.

It was listed on the National Register of Historic Places in 1989.
