= United States Post Office (Niagara Falls, New York) =

- US Post Office-Niagara Falls Main
- U.S. National Register of Historic Places
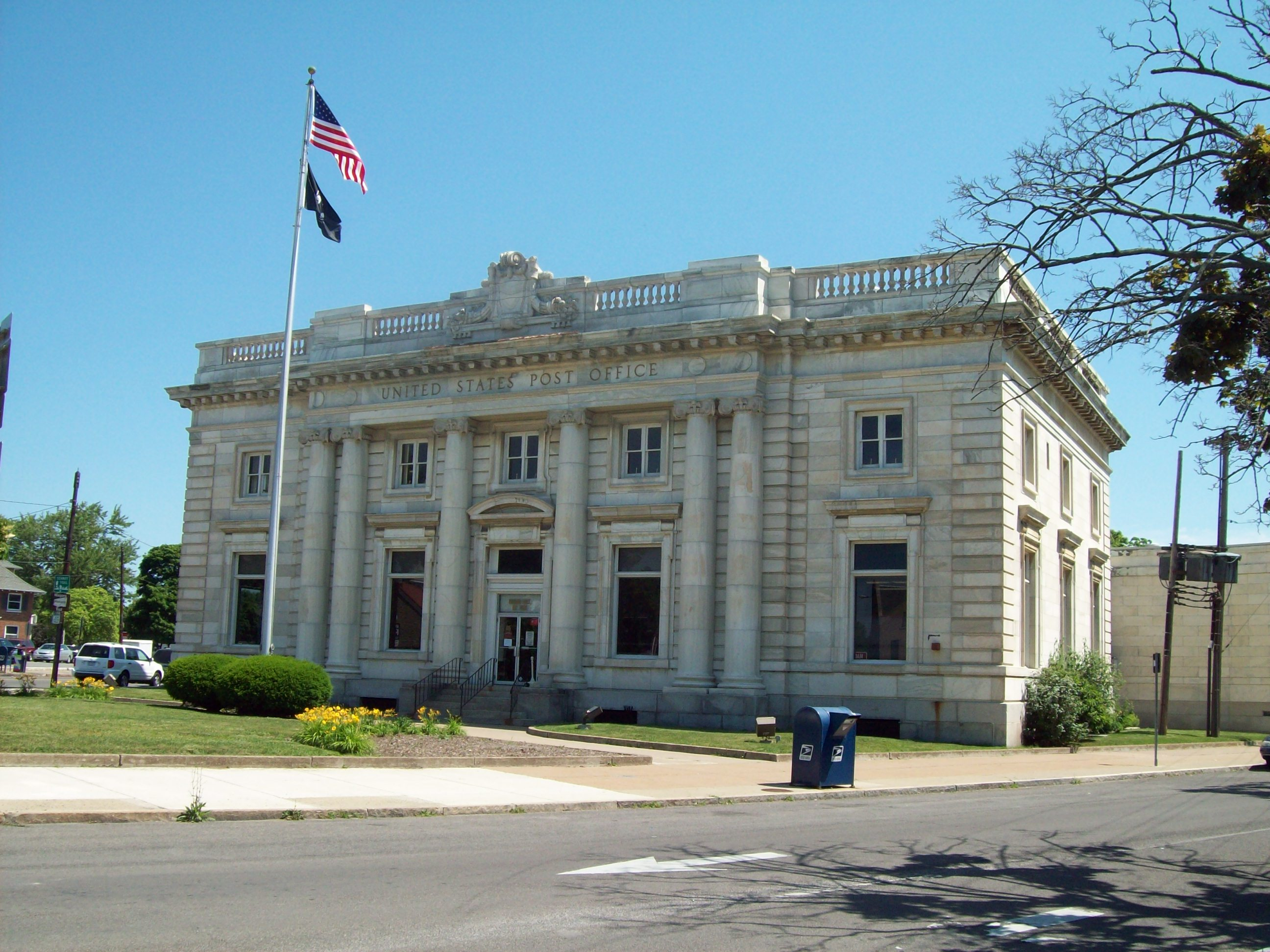
- US Post Office-Niagara Falls Main, June 2009

- Location within New York Location within the United States
- Location: 615 Main St., Niagara Falls, New York
- Coordinates: 43°5′34″N 79°3′25″W
- Built: 1906
- Architect: James Knox Taylor, James A. Wetmore
- Architectural style: Beaux Arts
- MPS: US Post Offices in New York State, 1858-1943, TR
- NRHP reference No.: 88002379
- Added to NRHP: May 11, 1989

US Post Office—Niagara Falls Main is a historic post office building located at Niagara Falls in Niagara County, New York. It was built in 1906, and is one of a number of post offices in New York State designed by the Office of the Supervising Architect of the Treasury Department, James Knox Taylor. The two story building is constructed of white Vermont marble on a granite base in a French Neoclassical style with Beaux-Arts details.

It was listed on the National Register of Historic Places in 1989.
