= United States Post Office (Oil City, Pennsylvania) =

- United States Post Office-Oil City
- U.S. National Register of Historic Places
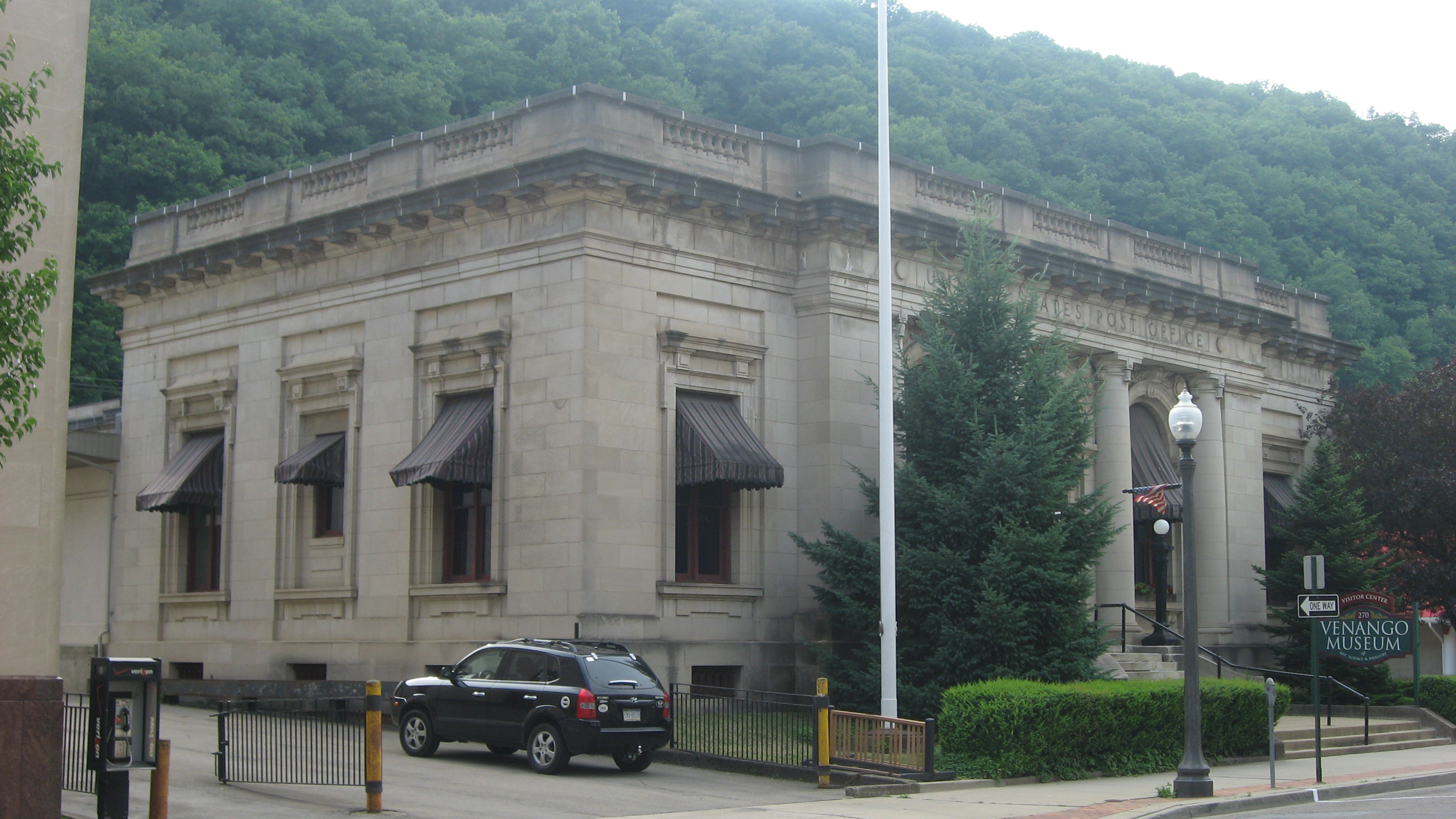
- Front and southern side

- Location within Pennsylvania Location within the United States
- Interactive map showing the location of U.S. Post Office Oil City
- Location: 270 Seneca St., Oil City, Pennsylvania
- Coordinates: 41°26′9″N 79°42′33″W
- Area: Less than 1 acre (0.40 ha)
- Built: 1906
- Architect: James Knox Taylor
- Architectural style: Beaux Arts
- NRHP reference No.: 77001197
- Added to NRHP: September 15, 1977

The United States Post Office, also known as the U.S. Federal Building, is an historic post office building in Oil City, Venango County, Pennsylvania, United States.

It was added to the National Register of Historic Places in 1977.

== History and architectural features ==
Designed by the Office of the Supervising Architect under the direction of James Knox Taylor, it was built in 1906, with extensions added in 1912 and 1928. Designed in the Beaux Arts style, it is a steel frame building faced with limestone ashlar.
