= United States Post Office and Courthouse (Albany, Georgia) =

- U.S. Post Office and Courthouse
- U.S. National Register of Historic Places
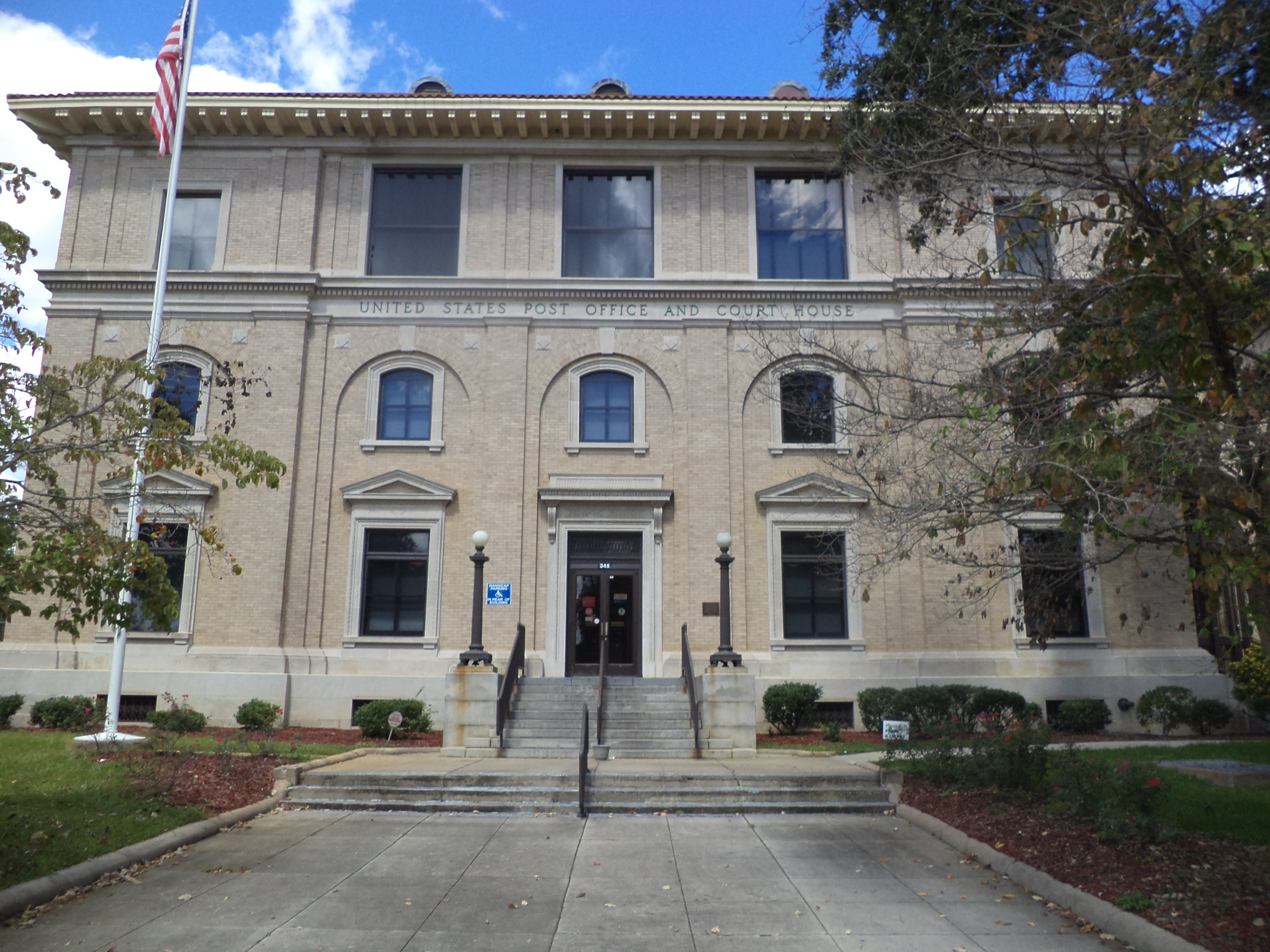

- Location within Georgia Location within the United States
- Interactive map showing the location of U.S. Post Office and Courthouse - Albany, Georgia
- Location: 337 Broad Ave., Albany, Georgia
- Coordinates: 31°34′38″N 84°9′20″W
- Area: 1 acre (0.40 ha)
- Built: 1910-12
- Built by: Gude and Company
- Architect: James Knox Taylor
- Architectural style: Late 19th and 20th Century Revivals, Second Renaissance Revival
- NRHP reference No.: 79003105
- Added to NRHP: June 22, 1979

The U.S. Post Office and Courthouse in Albany, Georgia is a three-story building that was built during 1910–1912. Its architecture style is primarily Second Renaissance Revival architecture and is credited to U.S. Supervising Architect James Knox Taylor. It is perhaps one of Knox's last designed works; he retired as Supervising Architect in 1912.

It served historically as a courthouse and as a post office. It was listed on the National Register of Historic Places in 1979.

== See also ==
- List of United States post offices
