= United States Courthouse (Des Moines) =

- U.S. Historic district – Contributing property
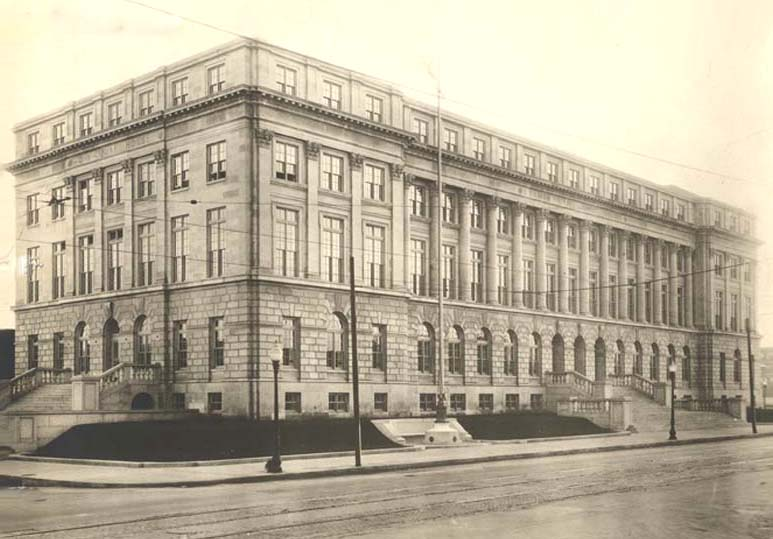
- 1929 photograph of the United States Courthouse.

- Location within Iowa Location within the United States
- Location: 123 E. Walnut St., Des Moines, Iowa
- Coordinates: 41°35′15.17″N 93°36′54.76″W
- Built: 1927-1928
- Architect: Office of the Supervising Architect under James A. Wetmore
- Architectural style: Classical Revival
- Part of: Civic Center Historic District (Des Moines, Iowa) (ID88001168)
- Added to NRHP: December 7, 1988

The United States Courthouse, located in Des Moines, Iowa, is the headquarters for the United States District Court for the Southern District of Iowa. It is part of the Civic Center Historic District that was listed on the National Register of Historic Places in 1988.

== History ==
The United States District Court for the District of Iowa was established on March 3, 1845. It was divided into the Northern and Southern Districts on July 20, 1882. Des Moines became the headquarters for the Southern District and in 1902 there were discussions that the riverfront would be a suitable location for a new Federal Courthouse. While other sites were considered in 1913 when funds were allocated for a new courthouse, the riverfront was still the desired location. Property was purchased in 1918, but there was a desire for more land so construction was delayed until it was purchased in 1926. The building was designed by and constructed under the direction of the Office of the Supervising Architect under James A. Wetmore. The courthouse joined other buildings in a Civic Center district that flanks the Des Moines River. Their placement reflects the City Beautiful Movement, which upheld the notions of civic patriotism, urban economics and beauty.

The building opened in 1929. Not only did it house space for the court, but also War, Justice, Navy, Interior, Agriculture, Commerce, Treasury and the United States Post Office departments. The building has subsequently been turned over to the courts and the other departments have moved to another office building downtown. An annex building was constructed to the south of the courthouse in 1995.

A landmark legal decision was made in the courthouse in 1979. Judge William Stuart held that the federal government has the right to legislate travel by long trucks on interstate highways that are maintained by federal funding. The decision was upheld by the United States Supreme Court.

By 2015 the Southern District of Iowa had determined that the courthouse does not have adequate space, there are not enough courtrooms, and there are security concerns. A spending bill approved by President Barack Obama in December 2015 provided money for a new federal courthouse in Des Moines.

The plot for the new courthouse was the site of the Des Moines Coliseum which was destroyed in a fire in 1949. YMCA built on the site, and it was demolished in 2015. Construction on the new courthouse started in August 2019 and opened in June 2025.

The former U.S. federal courthouse building went up for auction and sold for $2.6 million in September 2025. The building was purchased by a group represented by Brian Seidensticker, founder of Last Best Partners, a real estate investment company based in Ohio.

== Architecture ==
The courthouse complex occupies an entire city block with its main façade on Walnut Street. The building is four stories tall and built on a raised basement. While it appears to be rectangular in shape, it is actually E-shaped. The Classical Revival style building is a steel-framed structure covered in Indiana limestone. The raised basement is ashlar limestone and features flat-arched window openings. The piano nobile is finished with rusticated limestone and has semi-circular arched window openings that are ornamented with keystones. The top two stories feature two-story Corinthian columns and pilasters. The top floor has paneled pilasters and a banded cornice. The main façade is 19-bays wide with slightly projecting pavilions on both corners.

Like the exterior, the interior also reflects the Classical Revival style. The main entrance was relocated to the basement level to accommodate everyone regardless of disability. The entrance opens into the main foyer, which contains the original gold, black, and white speckled terrazzo flooring framed by a base of red Verona marble. The grand staircase is composed of Napoleon gray marble treads and buff-colored marble risers. The balustrade is made of cast iron and features vine-like curved scrolls with floral accents, fitted between bands of floral discs and squares. A mural is located above the lower stairs and portrays pioneers and a blacksmith. It is possibly a Works Project Administration commission. A plaster coffered ceiling completes the entrance hall.

The main courtroom on the second floor was restored in 1988. It still maintains its original floor bordered in pink Tennessee marble and a coffered ceiling. The walls are plastered to look like travertine ashlar masonry. The judge's bench sits on top of a platform of pink Tennessee marble. It sits in front of an alcove flanked by two Corinthian columns. Above the bench are the words, Justitia Omnibus (Justice for All).
