= United States Post Office (Beverly, Massachusetts) =

- U.S. Post Office—Beverly Main
- U.S. National Register of Historic Places
- U.S. Historic district – Contributing property
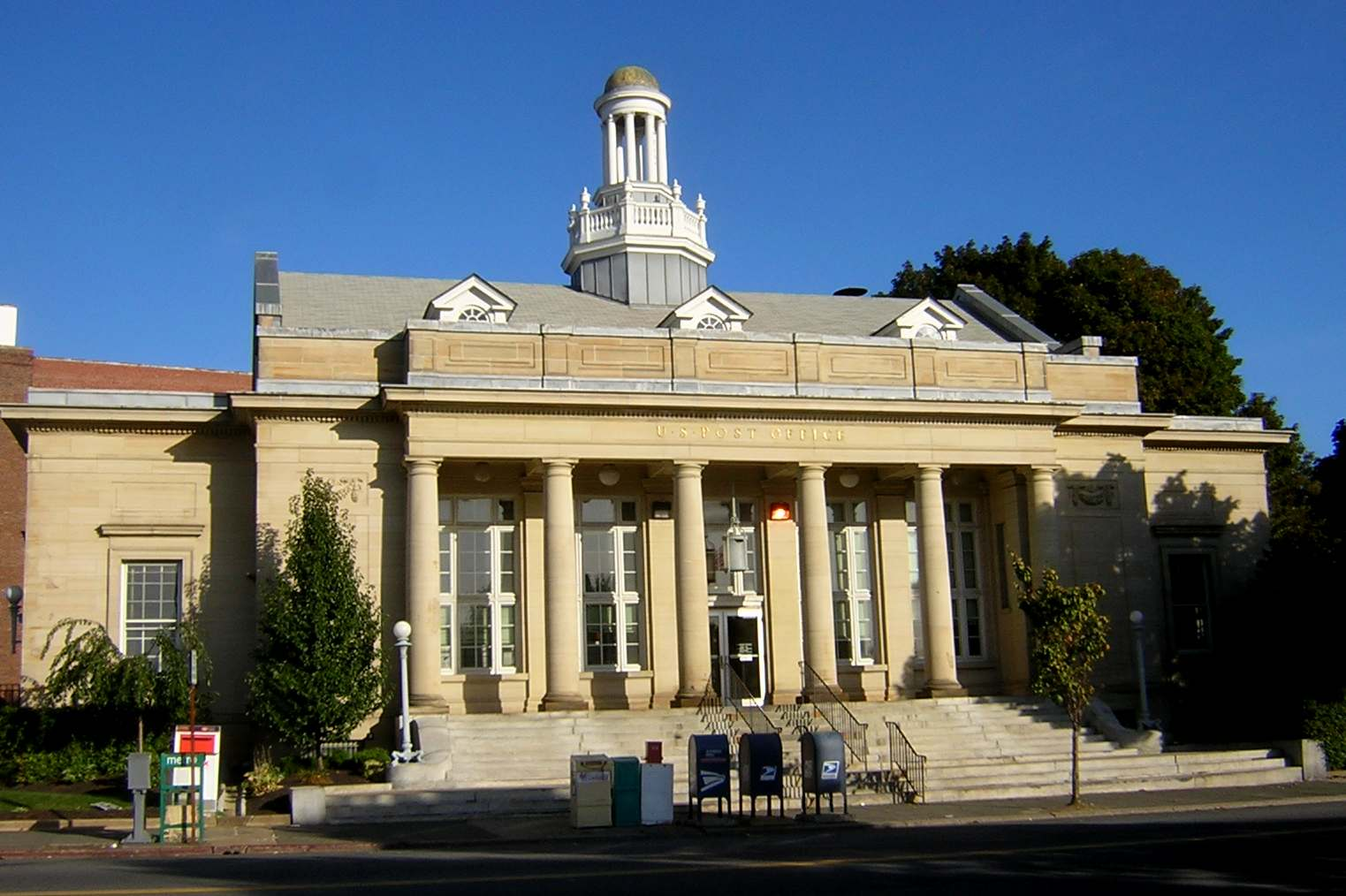

- Location within Massachusetts Location within the United States
- Interactive map showing the location of the U.S. Post Office-Beverly Main
- Location: 161 Rantoul St., Beverly, Massachusetts
- Coordinates: 42°32′50″N 70°53′2″W
- Built: 1910
- Architect: James Knox Taylor; Henry Merritt Wallis
- Architectural style: Colonial Revival, Classical Revival
- Part of: Beverly Depot-Odell Park Historic District (ID13001056)
- NRHP reference No.: 86001210

Significant dates
- Added to NRHP: June 4, 1986
- Designated CP: January 8, 2014

The United States Post Office—Beverly Main is a historic post office in Beverly, Massachusetts. Built in 1910, it is a prominent local example of Colonial and Classical Revival architecture, and a significant work late in the career of architect James Knox Taylor. It was listed on the National Register of Historic Places in 1986, and continues to serve as Beverly's main post office.

== Description and history ==
Beverly's main post office is located west of downtown Beverly, at the eastern end of Odell Park, which separates it from the historic Beverly Depot. It is a single story building built out of sandstone in a Classical Revival style. The front facade has a projecting portico supported by six Doric columns on a granite base, with granite steps leading up to a recessed entrance. The lobby area occupies the front of the main block, and is styled with terrazzo marble. There are one-bay wings on either side of the main block, which house offices. The roofline has an extended overhanging eave, above which is a parapet and a smaller gabled section topped by an octagonal cupola. The interior lobby areas retain original multicolored marble terrazzo flooring as well as period woodwork.

The post office was begun in 1910 and opened in 1912, to a design by Treasury architect James Knox Taylor. Taylor retired in 1912, so this building represents one of his later designs. It is in part unusual because most buildings of this type have flat roofs, while this one is gabled. A rear addition, in buff brick, was made to the building in 1935 with funding from the Public Works Administration. It was built as part of a projected urban renewal project in the neighborhood that was never fully realized.

== See also ==
- National Register of Historic Places listings in Essex County, Massachusetts
- List of United States post offices
