= Civic Center Historic District (Des Moines, Iowa) =

Historic district in Iowa, United States

- U.S. National Register of Historic Places
- U.S. Historic district
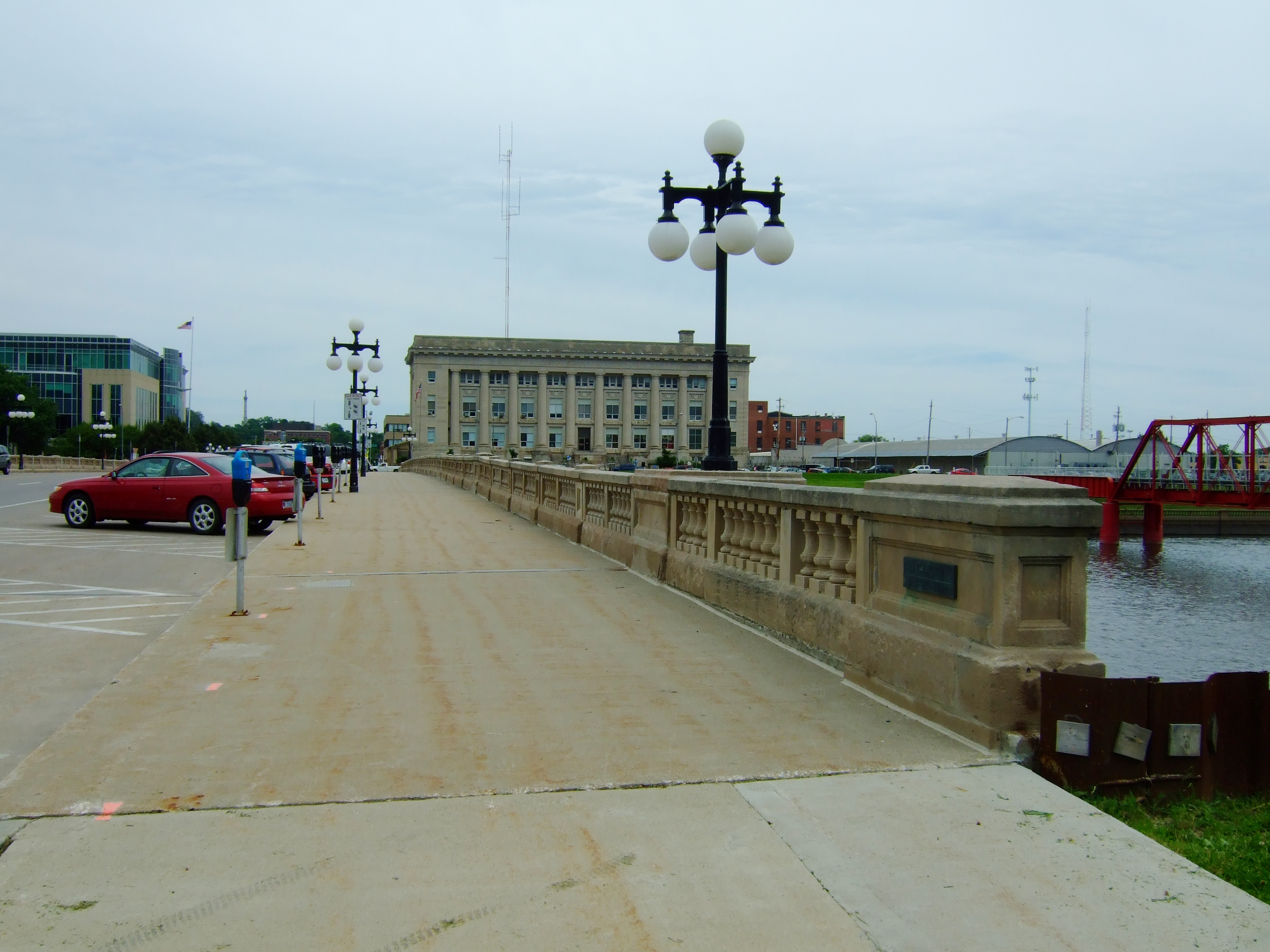
- The Court Avenue Bridge with the Municipal Court Building to the right.

- Location within Iowa Location within the United States
- Location: Both banks of the Des Moines River from the Center St. Dam to the Scott Ave. Dam; Des Moines, Iowa
- Coordinates: 41°34′59″N 93°36′57″W
- Area: 93 acres (38 ha)
- Architectural style: Art Deco, Beaux-Arts
- MPS: The City Beautiful Movement and City Planning in Des Moines, Iowa 1892—1938 MPS
- NRHP reference No.: 88001168
- Added to NRHP: December 7, 1988

The Civic Center Historic District is located in downtown Des Moines, Iowa, United States. It flanks both the Des Moines and Raccoon Rivers and their confluence. The district has been listed on the National Register of Historic Places since 1988. It is part of The City Beautiful Movement and City Planning in Des Moines, Iowa 1892—1938 MPS.

== Description ==
The structures within the district were built between 1900 and 1938. The contributing properties include six public buildings and seven structures. The six buildings include the Armory and World War Memorial Building, the former Public Library of Des Moines, the former Post Office, Municipal Building, Municipal Court Building, and the U.S. Court House. The seven contributing structures include the Center Street Dam, West River Front Park, East River Front Park, the River Walls, Scott Avenue Bridge and Dam, Court Avenue Bridge, and the Riverside Drive Bridge. There are also six noncontributing structures which include the Chicago, Rock Island and Pacific Railroad Bridge, the Des Moines Union Railway Company Bridge, the Rock Island Depot, the Grand Avenue Bridge, the Locust Street Bridge, and the Walnut Street Bridge.

The buildings in the Civic Center district were built along the river as part of the plans for riverfront development. Both the East and West Riverfront Parks are examples of the principles found in the City Beautiful Movement. The main facades of the municipal government buildings face the river itself while those of the federal government buildings face the street. Part of the planning included flood prevention from the flood-prone rivers as well as the way the Raccoon River flowed into the Des Moines River. There have been 11,617 linear feet of river walls built as part of the flood protection efforts. An intercepting sewer system to handle storm run-off is also a part of the river wall structure. Plans to construct the walls were completed in 1908. Construction of the walls, however, was not completed until 1938 as projects of the Civil Works Administration and the Works Project Administration.

When the Locust Street, Walnut Street, and Grand Avenue bridges were reconstructed in the late 1960s their original ornamentation was removed and the bridge decks rebuilt. Even though the original shape of the spans and piers remained, the loss of ornamentation significantly altered the bridges and they are no longer capable of contributing to the historic nature of the Civic Center district. The Court Avenue Bridge was reconstructed in the 1980s and its decorative elements were left in place. The railroad bridges have always been seen as intrusions in the district and it was suggested the railroad right of way be moved when the bridges were in need of significant repairs or replacement.

== Architecture ==
Five of the six buildings in the Civic Center Historic District were built between 1900 and 1928 (library, post office, municipal building, municipal court building, U.S. Courthouse) and are all designed in the Beaux-Arts style. They are further unified by the use of architectural elements such as the use of stone, rustication, full-height stone columns, balustrades, simple cornices, and round-arched openings. The City Beautiful movement planned buildings that were intended to blend with each other and work as a unit rather than stand apart as a monument to an architect's design. Inspiration for the district came from the White City of Chicago's 1893 Columbian Exposition, the École des Beaux-Arts, and European urban design in general on public building design. Even though it was designed in the Art Deco style, the Armory building blends in with the other buildings in the district.

The river walls were designed to be both ornamental as well as functional. Built of concrete, they feature the balustrade motif that was utilized on the public buildings and the bridges. The Court Avenue Bridge also utilizes balustrades in its design as well as the rounded arch, which is also featured in the buildings.

The Scott Avenue Bridge over the Des Moines River and the Riverside Bridge over the Raccoon River are both open-spandrel reinforced concrete arch-type bridges. They are both located near the confluence of the two rivers. Both bridges were completed in 1937 and were funded through the Works Progress Administration.

The Scott Avenue Bridge also has a dam associated with it. It is a concrete overflow dam and was built at the same time as the bridge. The dam is eight bays across with an overflow section in the two end bays. It utilizes a gate structure of three small vertical slide gates. Both sanitary and storm sewer lines flow through the dam. It anchors the southern end of the historic district. Anchoring the northern end is the Center Street dam. It is also the terminal point for the river walls. Built-in 1917, it is a concrete multiple-arch buttress-type dam. This dam features a free overflow section that is divided into eleven bays and a gate section composed of three vertical slide gates.

== Gallery of Contributing Properties ==
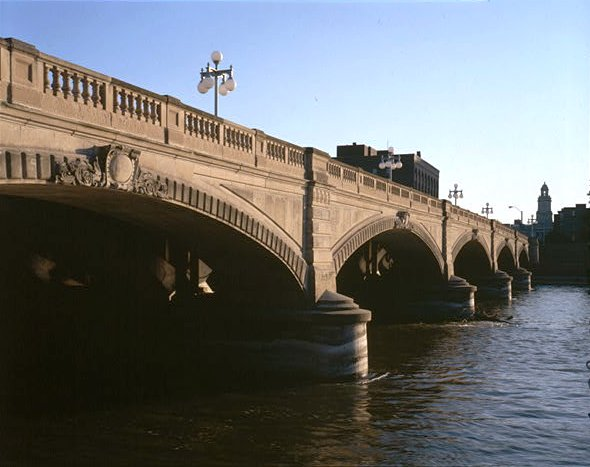
Court Avenue Bridge

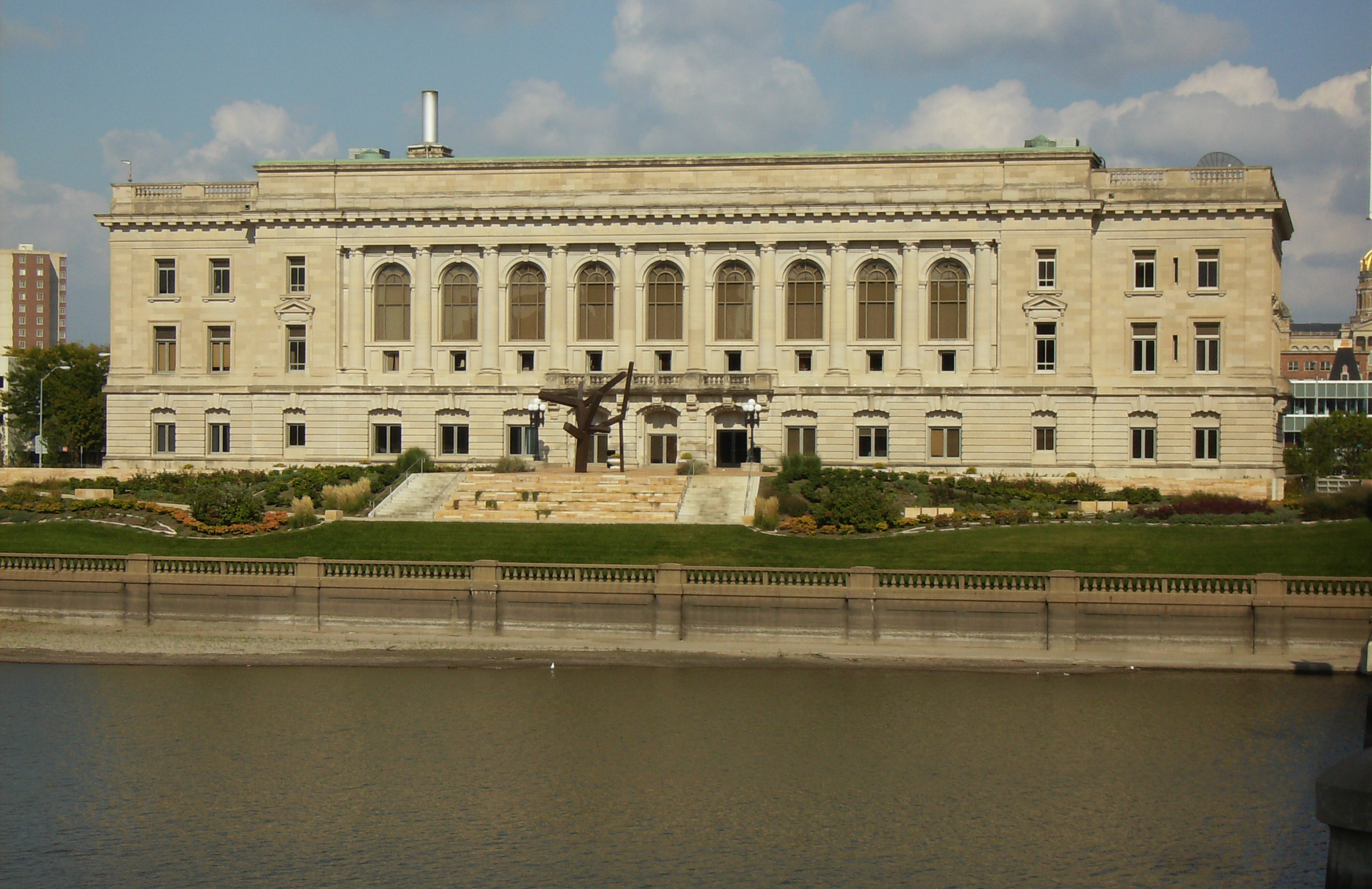
Municipal Building

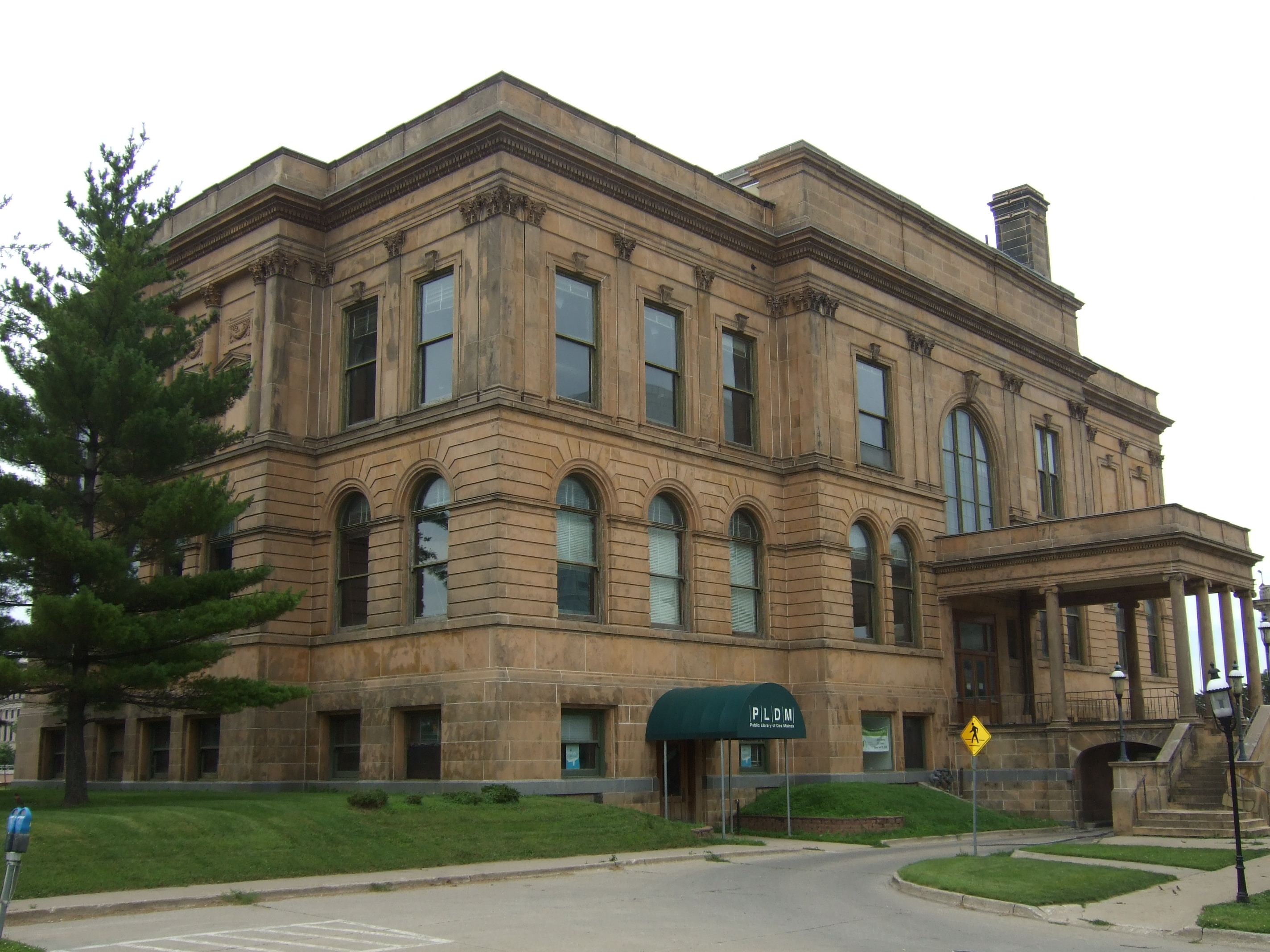
Public Library of Des Moines

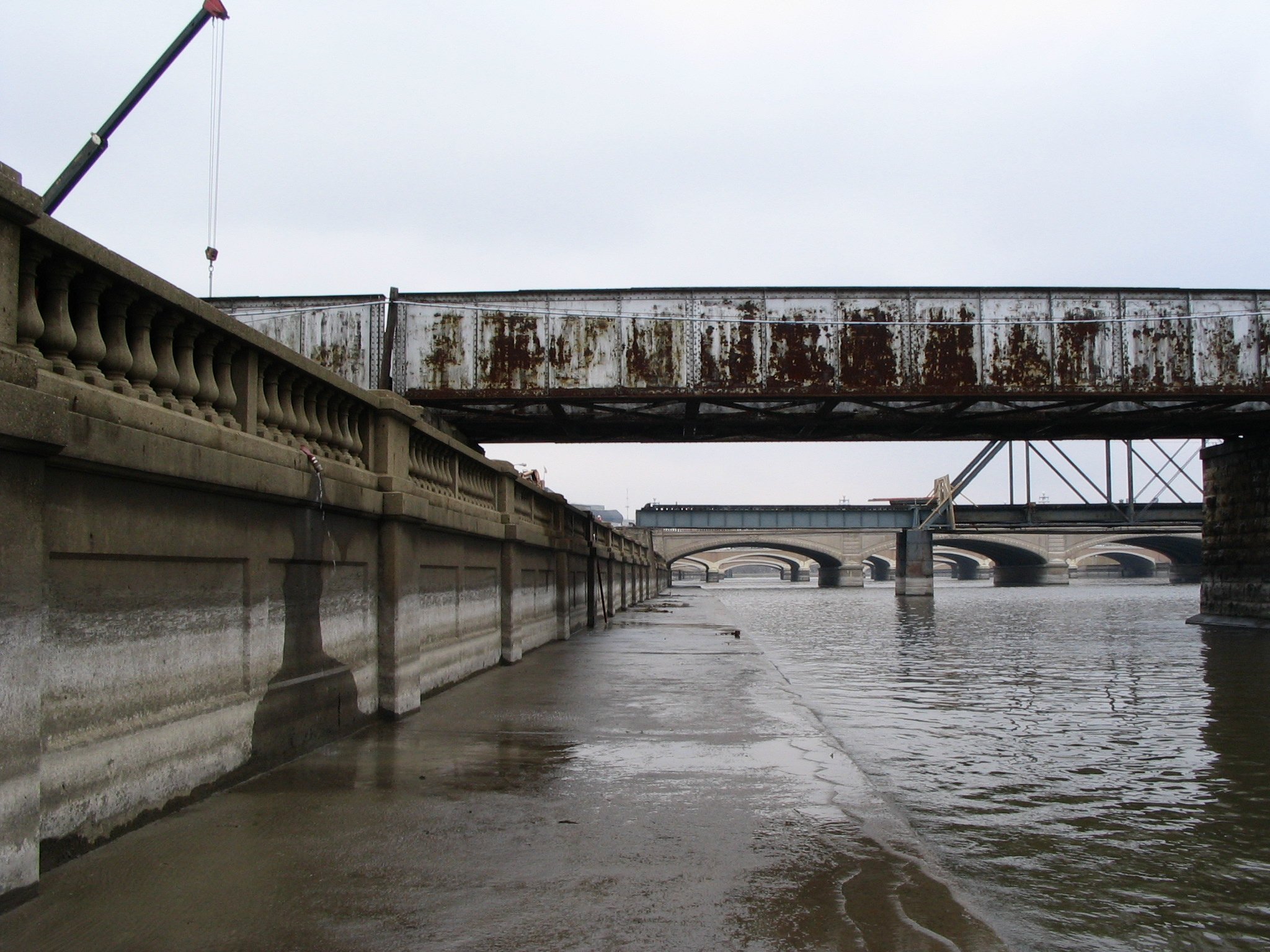
River Walls
