= United States Courthouse Building and Downtown Postal Station (Tampa, Florida) =

- Federal Building, U.S. Courthouse, Downtown Postal Station
- U.S. National Register of Historic Places
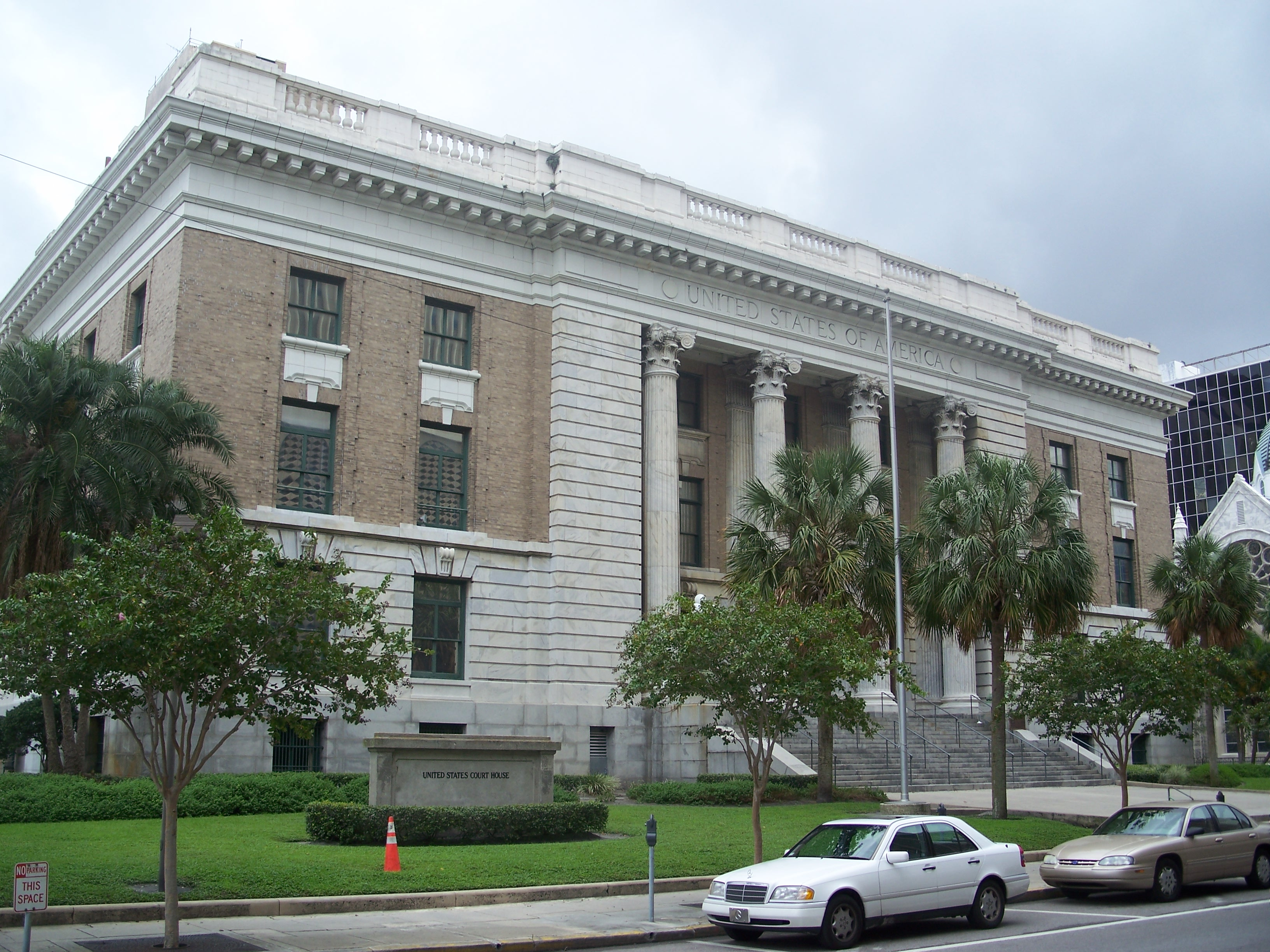

- Location within Florida Location within the United States
- Location: 601 N. Florida Ave., Tampa, Florida
- Coordinates: 27°56′59″N 82°27′27″W
- Built: 1902-1905
- Architect: James Knox Taylor
- Architectural style: Greek Revival, Renaissance
- NRHP reference No.: 74000633
- Added to NRHP: June 7, 1974

The U.S. Courthouse Building and Downtown Postal Station, also known as U.S. Post Office, Courthouse and Custom House or the U.S. Post Office, Courthouse and Custom House, is a historic courthouse of the United States District Court for the Southern District of Florida and later for the United States District Court for the Middle District of Florida in Tampa, Florida, United States. It is located at 601 Florida Avenue. On June 7, 1974, it was added to the U.S. National Register of Historic Places as Federal Building, U.S. Courthouse, Downtown Postal Station.

Construction on the building was completed in 1905, under the supervision of James Knox Taylor, Supervising Architect `of the United States Department of the Treasury. It served as a courthouse of the Southern District of Florida from then until the creation of the Middle District in 1962, and then served as a courthouse for the Middle District of Florida until 2001. The building is now owned by the city of Tampa.

The building is now used as a Le Méridien hotel.

== See also ==
- List of United States post offices
