= United States Post Office (Belvidere, Illinois) =

- United States Post Office-Belvidere
- U.S. National Register of Historic Places
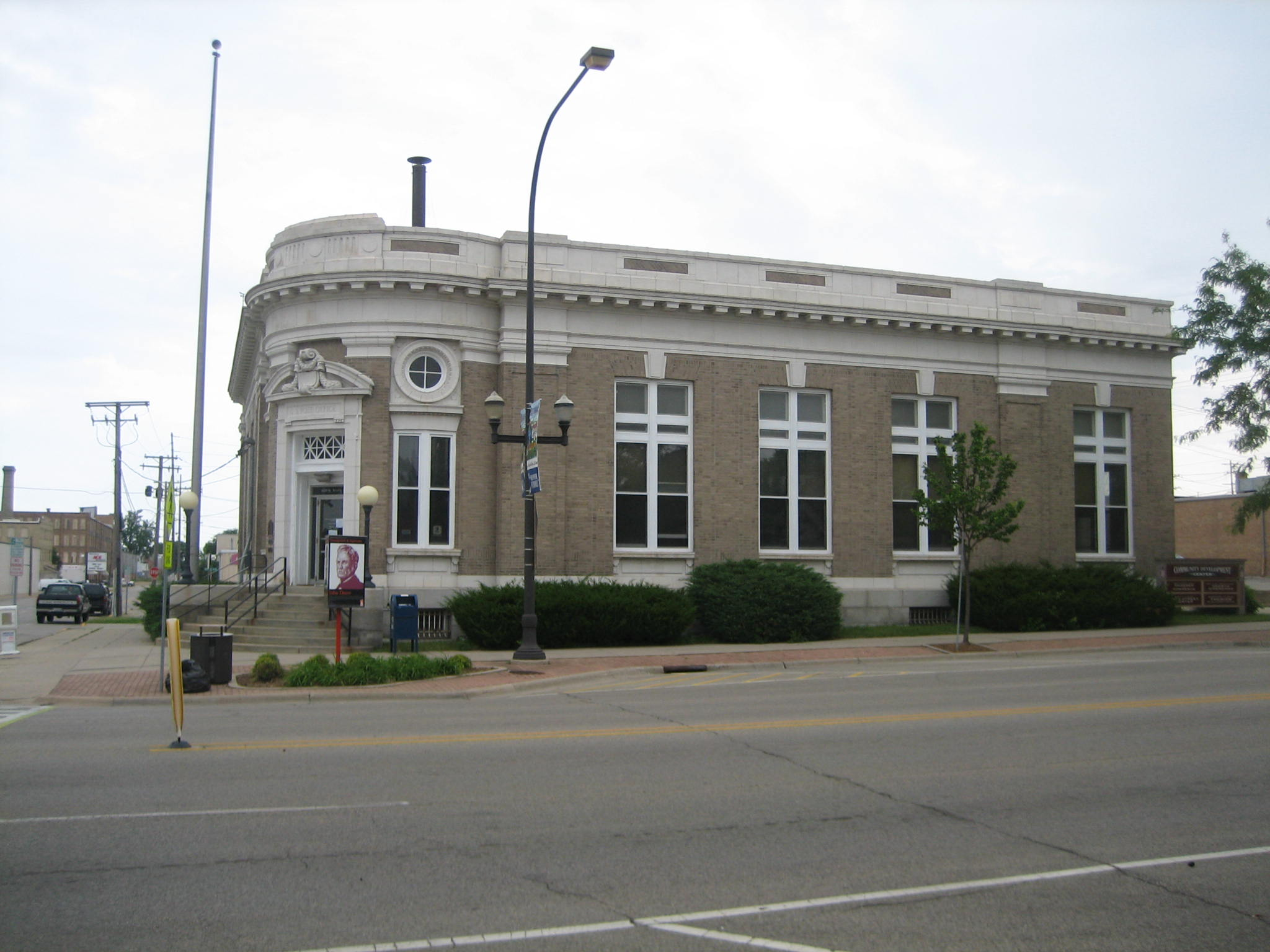

- Location within Illinois Location within the United States
- Interactive map showing the location for U.S. Post Office-Belvidere
- Location: 200 S. State St., Belvidere, Illinois
- Coordinates: 42°15′28″N 88°50′27″W
- Area: less than one acre
- Built: 1911
- Architect: James Knox Taylor
- Architectural style: Classical Revival
- NRHP reference No.: 00000473
- Added to NRHP: May 11, 2000

The Belvidere U.S. Post Office is a historic building located in the Illinois city's downtown business district. It was built in 1911 and represents a good example of Classical Revival architecture. It was added to the National Register of Historic Places as United States Post Office-Belvidere in 2000.

== History ==
The Belvidere U.S. Post Office was constructed in 1911, by Rockford contractor E. Maffioli. A.N. Eason was the construction supervisor for the Treasury Department and the building was constructed according to a schedule which slated completion for September 1, 1911 and occupancy for October 11, 1911. The building was completed on schedule and dedicated on October 11, 1911, attracting a large crowd. The building served as post office until it was put up for sale in 1997. It was sold in 1998 to a member of the public.

== Architecture ==
The Belvidere U.S. Post Office was built in the Classical Revival style of architecture and was designed by Supervising Architect of the U.S. Treasury James Knox Taylor. The building uses a free mix of Classical and Renaissance forms and possesses several elements characteristic of Classical Revival. The interior dome, the broken pediment over the entryway (a Greek Revival form), finely dressed stonework, a monumental scale, and sculptural stone details are all commonly found among Classical Revival-styled buildings.

== Historic Significance ==
The Belvidere Post Office reflects the designs of post offices promoted by the U.S. federal government in the early 1900s. The post office is an architecturally significant example of Classical Revival architecture and one of Belvidere's most elaborate Classical buildings. The U.S. Post Office in Belvidere, Illinois was added to the National Register of Historic Places on May 11, 2000.

== See also ==
- List of United States post offices
