= United States Post Office (Corning, New York) =

- US Post Office-Corning
- U.S. National Register of Historic Places
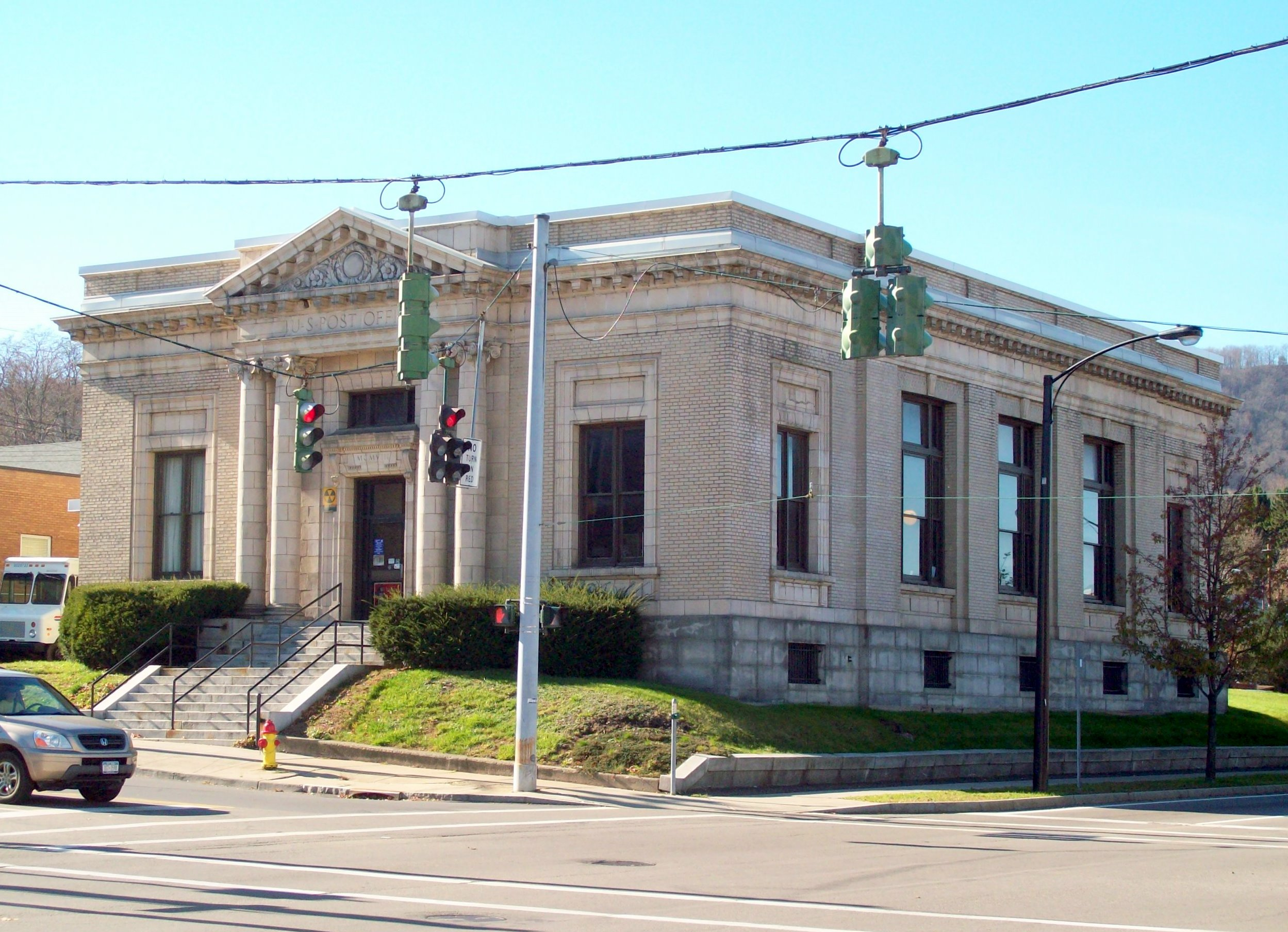
- U.S. Post Office, November 2010

- Location within New York Location within the United States
- Location: 129 Walnut St., Corning, New York
- Coordinates: 42°8′34″N 77°3′28″W
- Area: less than one acre
- Built: 1908
- Architect: US Treasury Dept.; Taylor, James Knox
- Architectural style: Classical Revival, Neoclassical
- MPS: US Post Offices in New York State, 1858-1943, TR
- NRHP reference No.: 88002474
- Added to NRHP: November 17, 1988

US Post Office-Corning is a historic post office building located at Corning in Steuben County, New York. It was built in 1908-1909 and is one of a number of post offices in New York State designed by the Office of the Supervising Architect of the Treasury Department, James Knox Taylor. It is a rectangular, one story building faced with pressed yellow brick in the Classical Revival style. The exterior features elaborate terra cotta decoration.

It was listed on the National Register of Historic Places in 1988.
