= United States Post Office (Des Moines, Iowa) =

- U.S. Post Office
- U.S. National Register of Historic Places
- U.S. Historic district – Contributing property
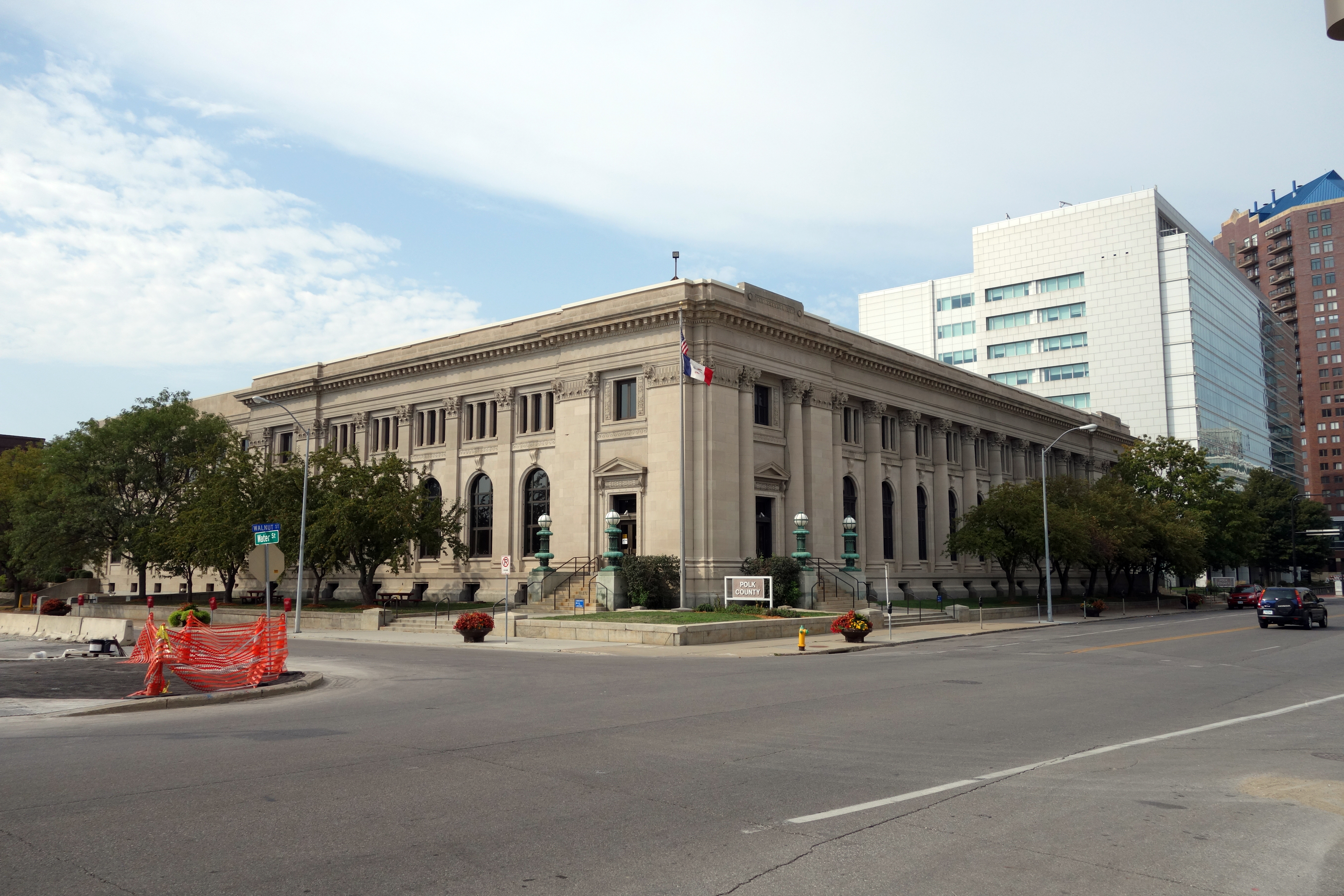

- Location within Iowa Location within the United States
- Location: 2nd and Walnut Sts., Des Moines, Iowa
- Coordinates: 41°35′12.2″N 93°37′8.3″W
- Built: 1909-1910
- Architect: James Knox Taylor
- Part of: Civic Center Historic District (ID88001168)
- NRHP reference No.: 74002323
- Added to NRHP: November 19, 1974

The United States Post Office is a historic building located in Des Moines, Iowa, United States. It was individually listed on the National Register of Historic Places in 1974. It became a contributing property of the Civic Center Historic District when it was established in 1988. It now houses administrative offices for Polk County.

== History ==
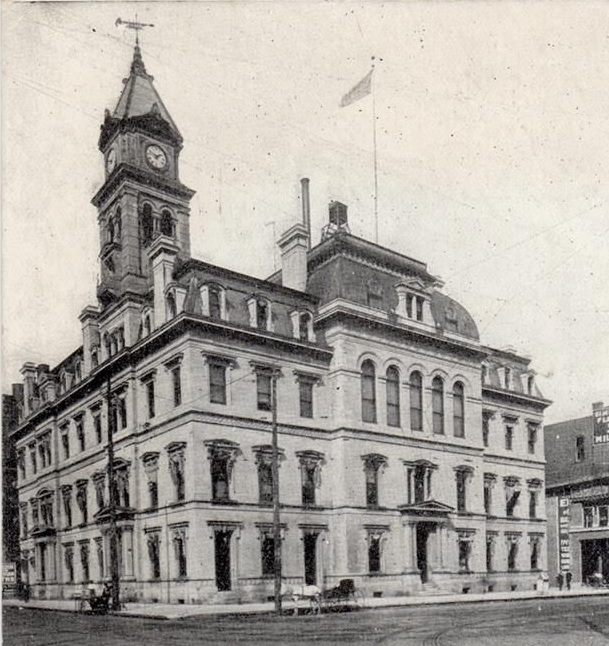
U. S. Courthouse and Post Office, Des Moines, Iowa, built- 1871, demolished- 1968

Prior to the opening of this building the post office was located in the old Federal Building at Fifth and Court Avenues, beginning in 1870. A $150,000 appropriation was approved by the United States Congress in legislation passed in 1902 for property for a new post office. A further appropriation was passed in 1904 and in 1906 the first of three appropriations for constructing the building was passed. The building was designed by James Knox Taylor of the United States Treasury Department staff in 1908 and construction began the following year. The building was completed in 1910 for $488,016.67. The post offices was the second building constructed in the Civic Center district and the first structure the federal government provided as part of the City Beautiful Movement project in the city of Des Moines.

The post office moved their operations into the building in the spring of 1910. By 1925 the building was becoming too small to house postal operations. The Des Moines architectural firm of Wetherell & Harrison drew up plans in the early 1930s for a large addition to the south, but no money was appropriated for it. Plans for a smaller addition were approved in 1934 and completed the following year. There were plans for another addition to the south, but it was never built. However, a smaller addition, which was torn down in the 1970s, was subsequently built. The post office moved their operations from this building to a larger facility at Second and University Avenues in 1971. The building sat empty until the late 1970s when it was acquired by Polk County. They in turn renovated the building for their use as an office building, which was designed by the Des Moines architectural firm of Woodburn & O'Neil. The north lobby of the building is preserved and used as a public place for art and historical exhibits. It is known as the Polk County Heritage Gallery.

== Architecture ==
The former post office building is similar in design to the Municipal Court Building across the Des Moines River, which was designed and built at the same time. Both the original building and the 1935 addition are steel frame structures faced with limestone and built on a granite base. It features large semi-circular arched windows, tall smooth columns, simple entablature, massing, materials, and classical detail. The addition continues the massing and restrained design of the original building in a simplified manner that was more popular in the 1930s. The county created a promenade entranceway on the south side of the building when they renovated the structure in the late 1970s.

== See also ==
- List of United States post offices
