= Webster City Post Office =

- U.S. National Register of Historic Places
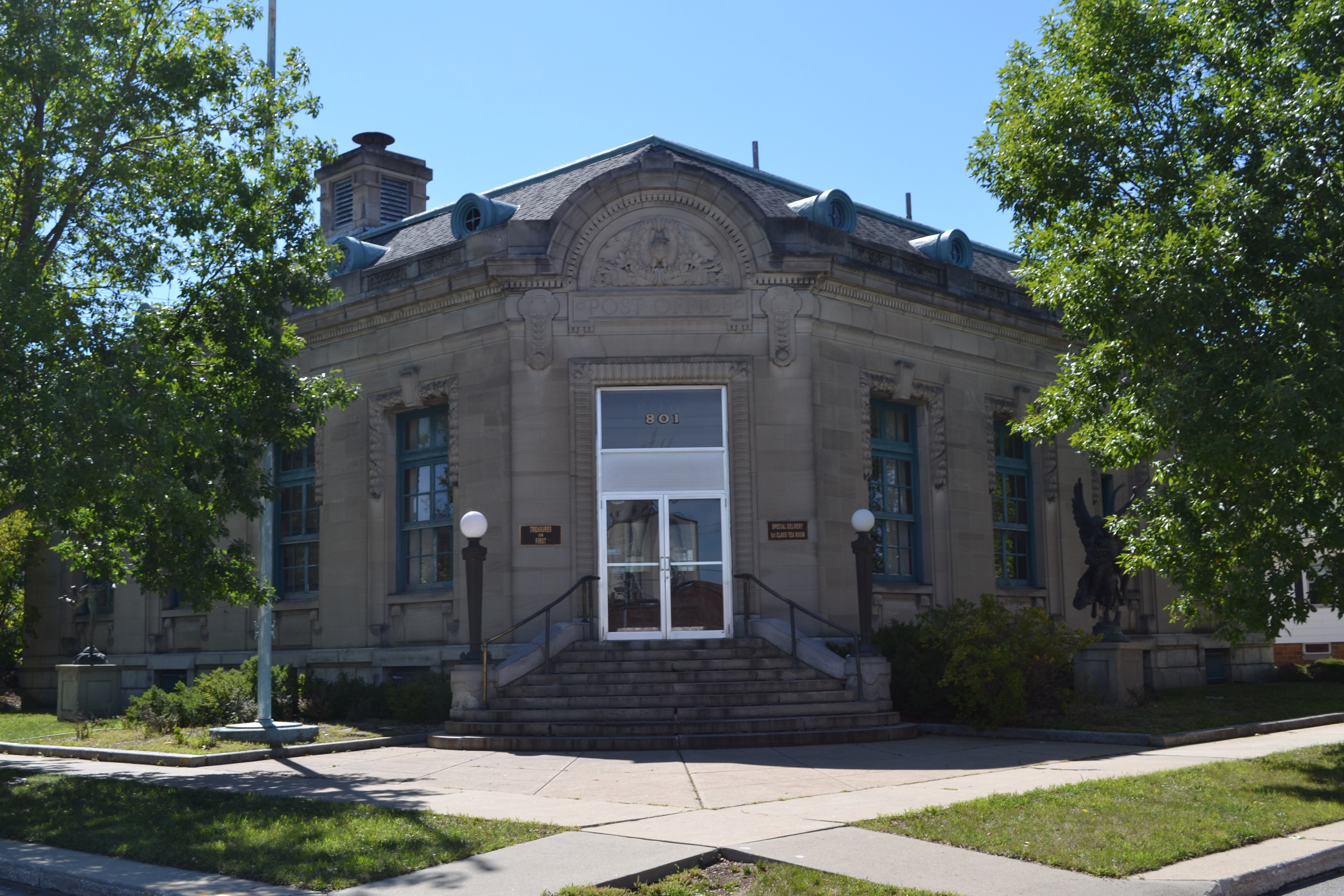

- Location within Iowa Location within the United States
- Location: 801 Willson Ave. Webster City, Iowa
- Coordinates: 42°28′06″N 93°49′11″W
- Area: 0.341 acres (0.138 ha)
- Built: 1909
- Built by: Charles E. Atkinson
- Architect: James Knox Taylor
- Architectural style: Beaux-Arts
- NRHP reference No.: 82002619
- Added to NRHP: July 6, 1982

The Webster City Post Office is a historic building located in Webster City, Iowa, United States. Previous post office buildings in the city were housed in leased storefronts along Seneca Street. The Beaux-Arts style building was designed by the U.S. Treasury with James Knox Taylor as the supervising architect. Contractor Charles E. Atkinson completed the building in 1909. The stone building features a stone frieze, cornice, and a mansard roof. It was listed on the National Register of Historic Places in 1982.

== See also ==
- List of United States post offices
