= United States Post Office (Creston, Iowa) =

- U.S. Post Office
- U.S. National Register of Historic Places
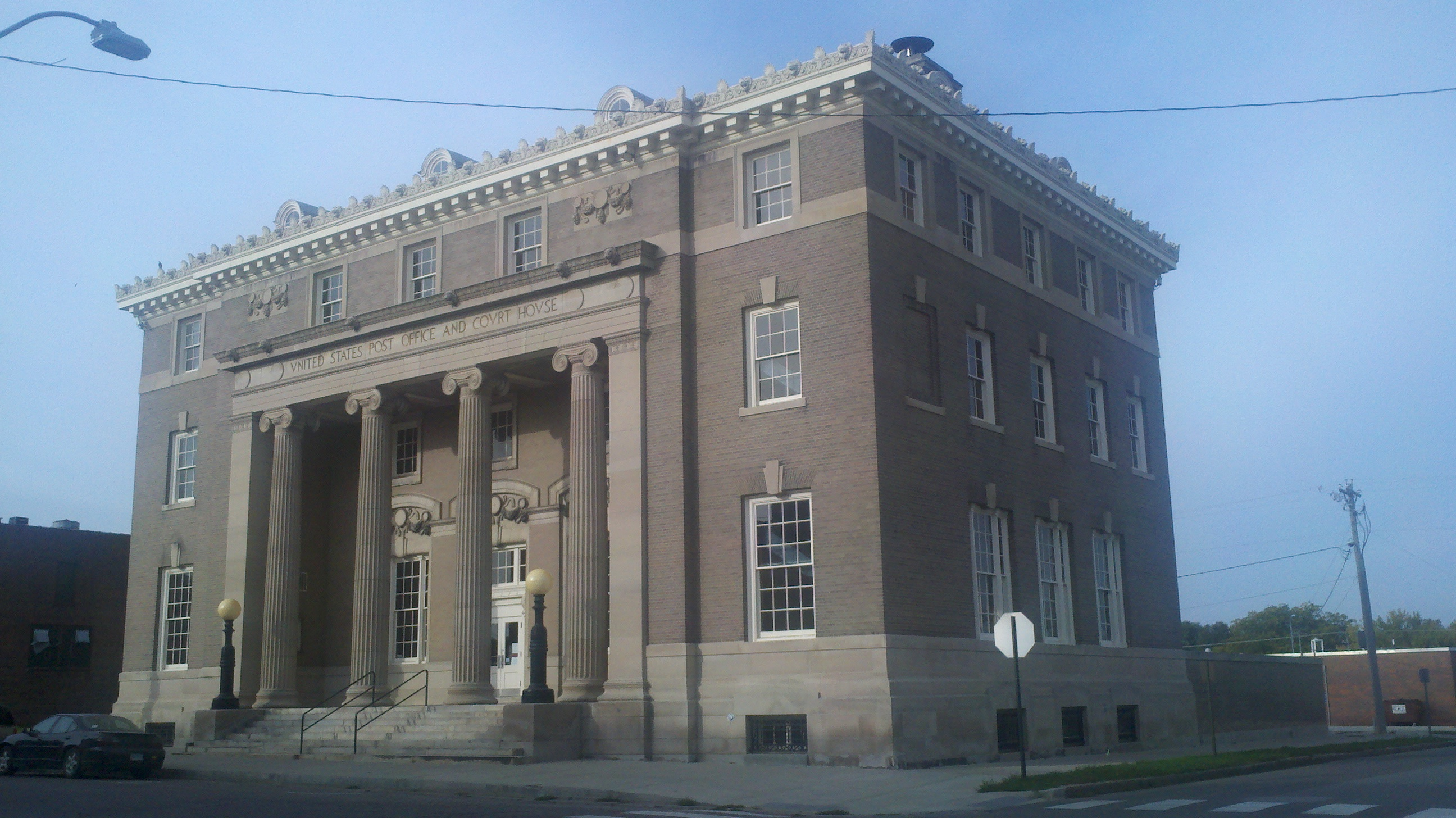

- Location within Iowa Location within the United States
- Location: 222 Maple St. Creston, Iowa
- Coordinates: 41°03′34″N 94°21′46″W
- Area: less than one acre
- Built: 1901
- Architect: James Knox Taylor
- Architectural style: Beaux-Arts
- NRHP reference No.: 78001264
- Added to NRHP: December 8, 1978

The former United States Post Office is a historic building located in Creston, Iowa, United States. Built in 1901, the building housed the post office on the main floor and a federal courtroom on the second floor. The combination Beaux-Arts and Georgian Revival structure was designed by James Knox Taylor who was the Supervising Architect of the United States Department of the Treasury.

The Beaux-Arts style is found in the cornice, lucarnes, portico, and the door and window enframements. The Georgian Revival is found in the general mass and elevation of the building, window detail, use of brick, the hipped roof, and the division of the main facade into a projecting central pavilion and single-bay wings. The building was listed on the National Register of Historic Places in 1978. The post office has subsequently been relocated to a more modern building, and this building has been converted into commercial space.

== See also ==
- List of United States post offices
