= James Knox Taylor =

American architect (1857–1929)

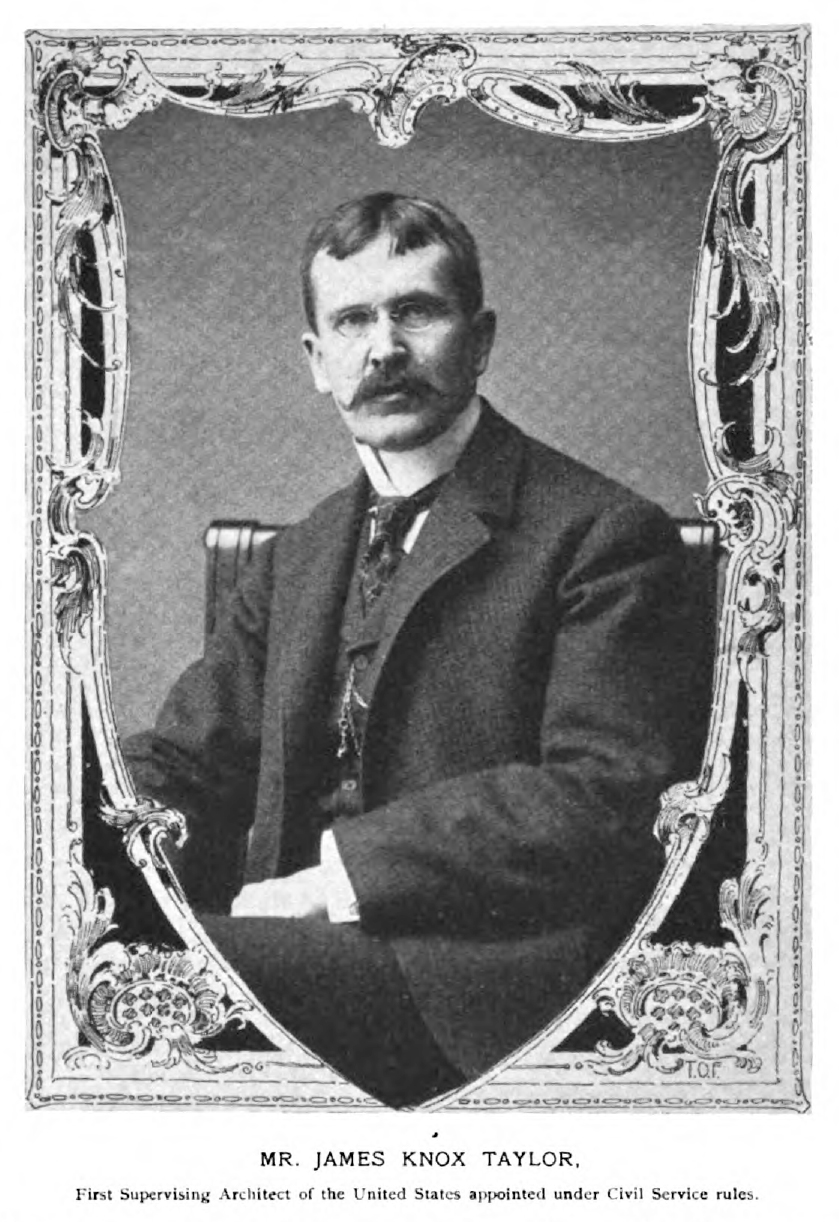
James Knox Taylor

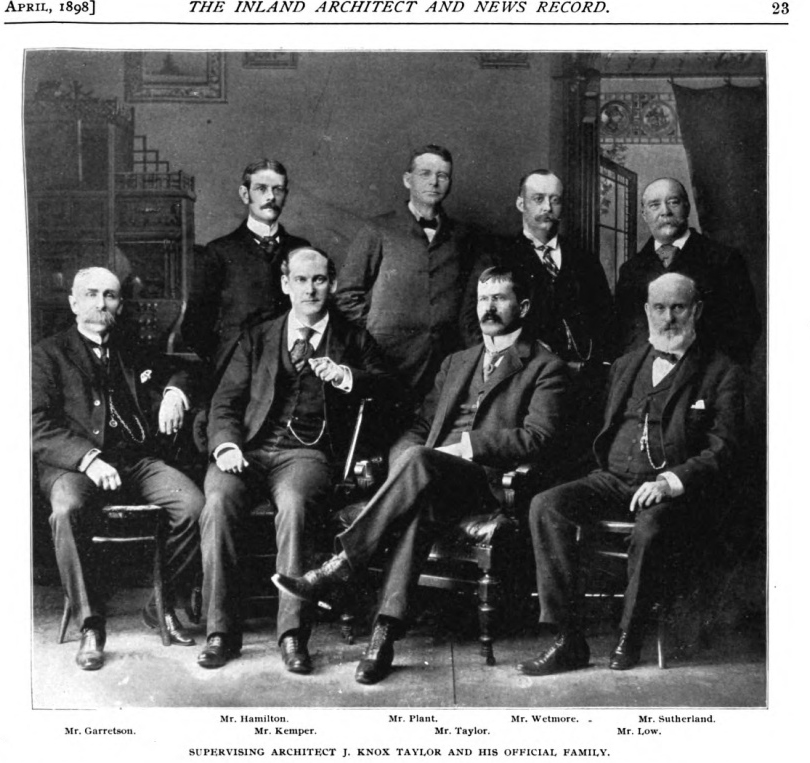
James Knox Taylor & Staff

James Knox Taylor (October 11, 1857 – August 27, 1929) was Supervising Architect of the United States Department of the Treasury from 1897 to 1912. His name is listed ex officio as supervising architect of hundreds of federal buildings built throughout the United States during the period.

== Early career ==
The son of H. Knox and Mary (Young) Taylor, he was born in Knoxville, Illinois, and attended schools in Minnesota. He attended Massachusetts Institute of Technology where he was a classmate of William Martin Aiken, who would precede him in the position of Supervisory Architect, and Cass Gilbert. After graduation, he worked in the New York City office of Charles C. Haight and later with Bruce Price. In 1882 he moved to St. Paul, Minnesota where he formed a partnership with Gilbert, as Gilbert & Taylor. They built many homes and churches. Subsequently, they designed the Pioneer and Endicott Buildings. In 1893 he moved to Philadelphia and formed a partnership with Amos J. Boyden. In 1895 he got a job with Aiken, the Supervisory Architect, as a temporary draftsman. In 1897, following a Civil Service Commission examination, he became the Supervisory Architect, the first architect promoted from within.

== Tarsney Act ==
In 1893 Missouri Congressman John Charles Tarsney introduced a bill that allowed the Supervisory Architect to hold competitions among private architects for major structures. Competitions under Taylor's supervision included the Alexander Hamilton U.S. Custom House, James Farley Post Office, Cleveland Federal Building, U.S. Post Office and Courthouse (Baltimore, Maryland) and U.S. Customhouse (San Francisco, California) (which are all now on the National Register of Historic Places) among others. The competitions were met with enthusiasm by the community but were also marred by scandal, as when Taylor picked his ex-partner Cass Gilbert for the New York Customs House commission. In 1913 the act was repealed.

In 1912, Taylor returned to MIT for two years as director of the department of architecture, then moved to Yonkers, New York, where for several years he continued practicing. In 1928, he retired to Tampa, Florida, where he died the following year.

== Selected works ==
From 1897 through 1912 Taylor is credited as "supervising architect" for federal buildings constructed during his tenure, a list which includes dozens of post offices, court houses and other structures. Local architects are often credited as well. As the head of a sizable government office, Taylor's direct involvement with any of these projects is open to question.

A partial list of these works include:

- Ellis Island Immigrant Hospital, 1908
- Pioneer and Endicott Buildings, St. Paul, Minnesota, 1890 (with Cass Gilbert)
- Denver Mint, Denver, 1897
- United States Post Office (Creston, Iowa), 1901
- Philadelphia Mint (Third Building), Philadelphia, 1901
- Old Post Office (Buffalo, New York), 1901
- United States Post Office (Corning, New York), 1908
- Gatke Hall, now part of Willamette University, Salem, Oregon, 1901
- United States Courthouse Building and Downtown Postal Station (Tampa, Florida), 1902–1905
- Public Safety Building, Cumberland, Maryland, 1904
- United States Post Office and Courthouse, Fergus Falls, Minnesota, 1904
- United States Post Office, Niagara Falls, New York, 1904
- U.S. Post Office and Court House, San Francisco, now the United States Court of Appeals for the Ninth Circuit, 1905
- U.S. Post Office (Oil City, Pennsylvania), 1906
- U.S. Custom House, Houston 1907–1911
- Old Post Office (Albuquerque, New Mexico), 1908
- Old Post Office/Museum of Ceramics (East Liverpool, Ohio), 1908
- Gainesville, Florida Post Office, 1909
- Webster City, Iowa Post Office, 1909
- United States Post Office, Courthouse, and Custom House (Spokane, Washington), 1909
- U.S. Post Office (Beverly, Massachusetts), 1910
- Post Office Building (Greenville, Texas), 1910
- U.S. Post Office (Santa Rosa, California), 1910
- U.S. Post Office and Courthouse (Albany, Georgia), 1910–12
- U.S. Post Office (Belvidere, Illinois), 1911
- U.S. Post Office (Des Moines, Iowa), 1910
- Old Waterville Post Office, Waterville, Maine, 1911
- United States Post Office (Connellsville, Pennsylvania), 1911–1913
- United States Post Office Mineral Wells, Texas, 1911–1913
- Alaska Governor's Mansion, Juneau, Alaska, 1912
- United States Post Office (Schenectady, New York), 1912
- United States Post Office (Johnstown, New York), Johnstown, New York, 1912–1913
- United States Post Office (Punxsutawney, Pennsylvania), Punxsutawney, Pennsylvania, 1912–1914
- United States Post Office (Westerly, Rhode Island), Westerly, Rhode Island, 1913-1914
- United States Post Office (Penn Yan, New York), Penn Yan, New York, 1922
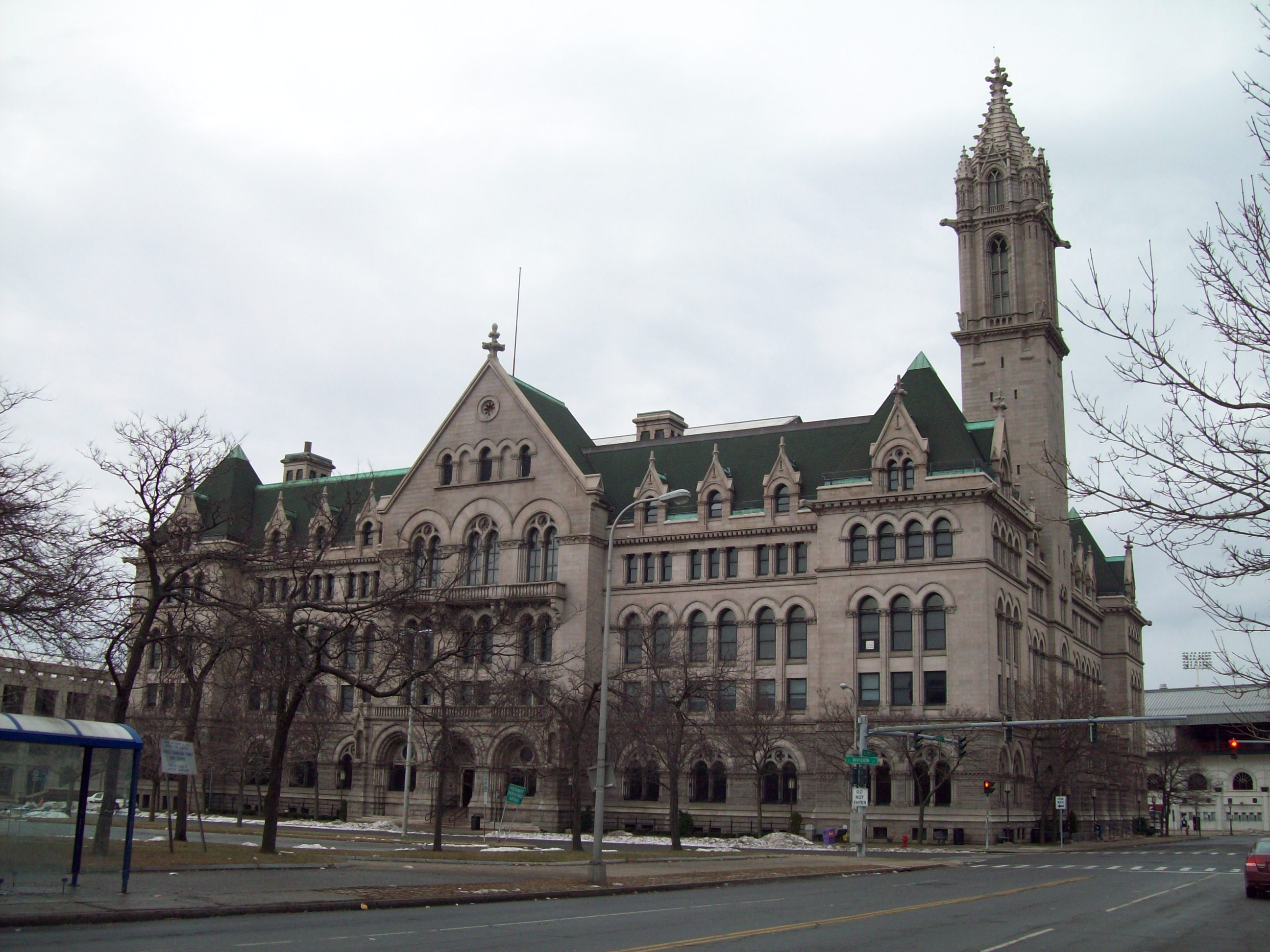
U.S. Post Office, Buffalo, New York, 1901

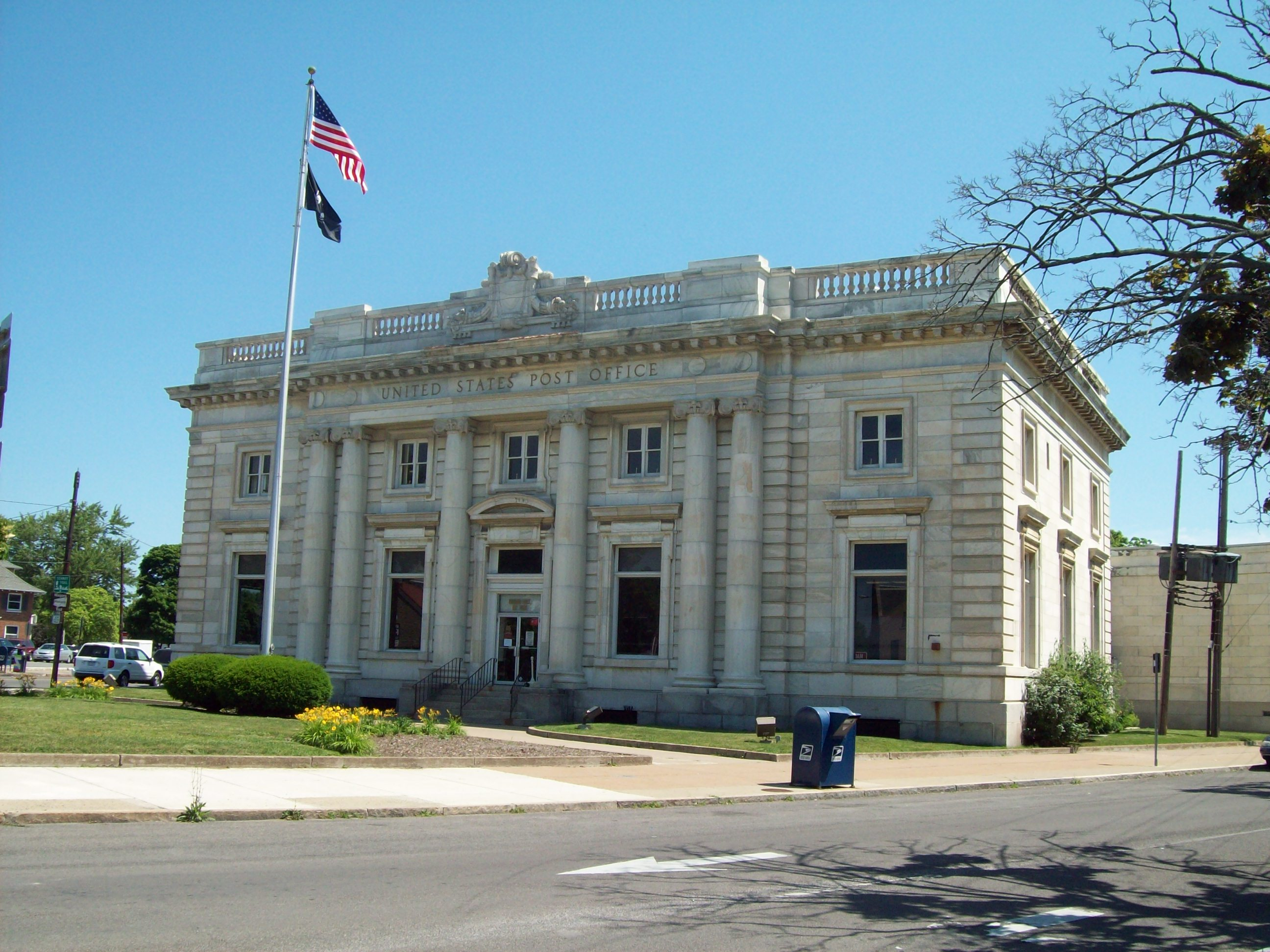
U.S. Post Office, Niagara Falls, New York, 1904

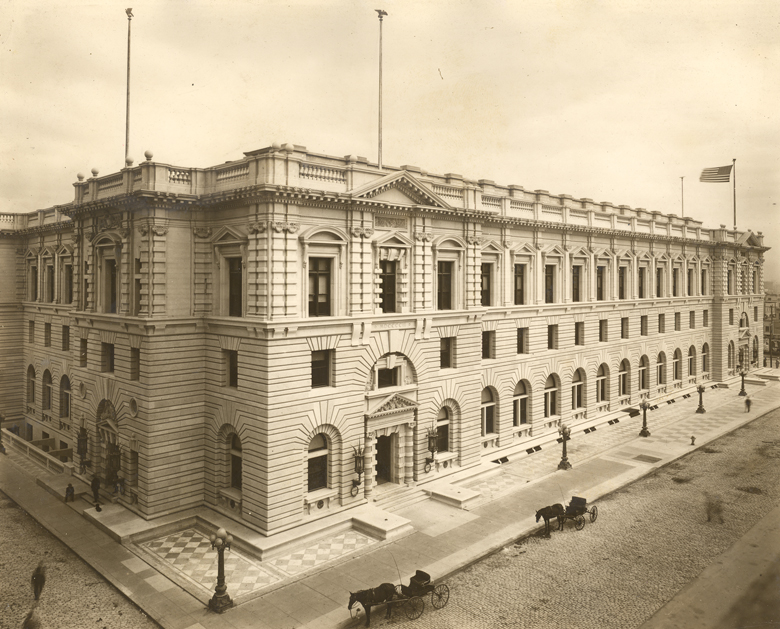
U.S. Post Office and Court House, San Francisco, now the United States Court of Appeals for the Ninth Circuit, 1905

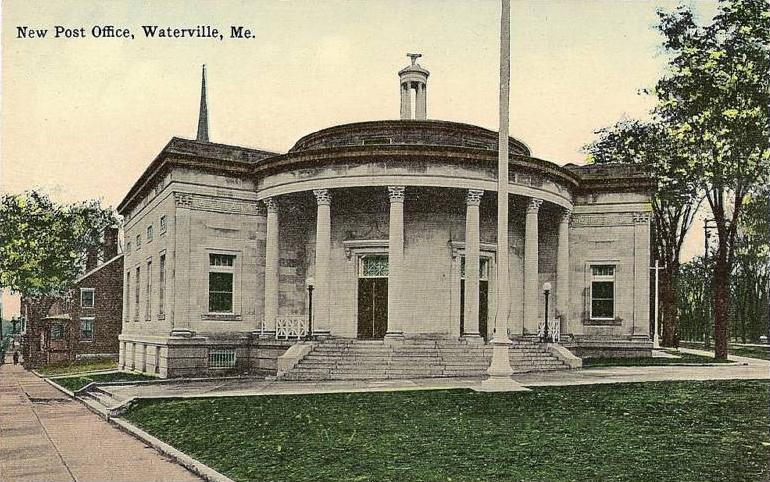
U.S. Post Office, Waterville, Maine, 1911

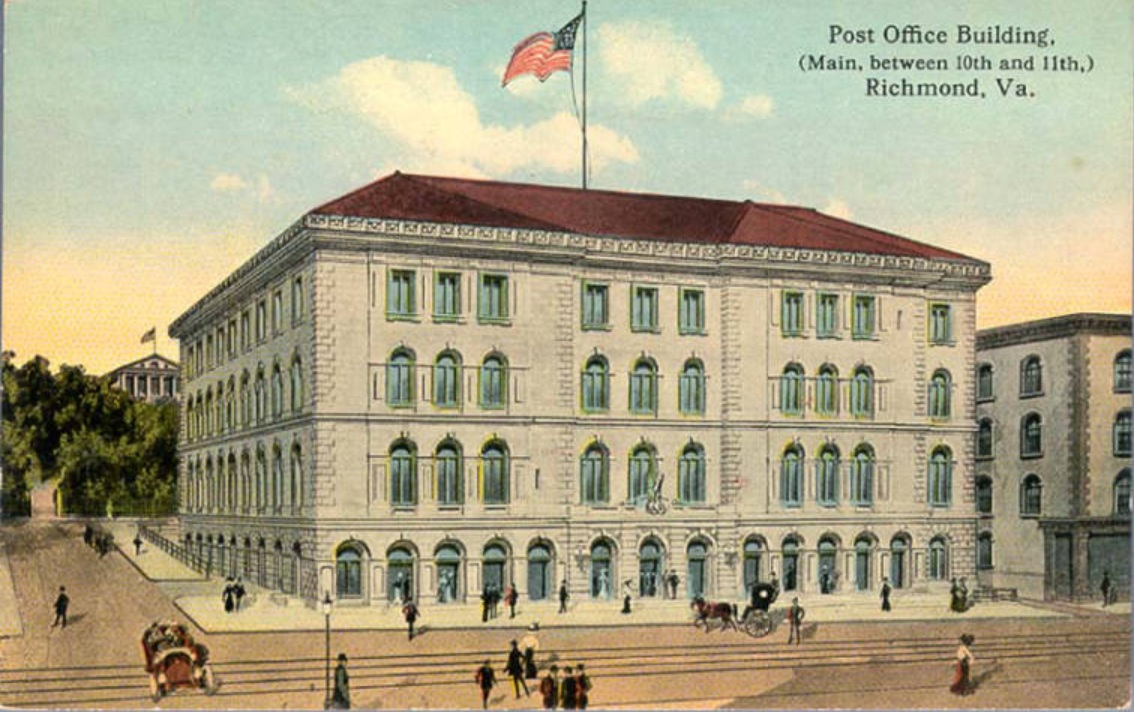
U.S. Custom House & Post Office, Richmond, VA, 1910–12 Renovation

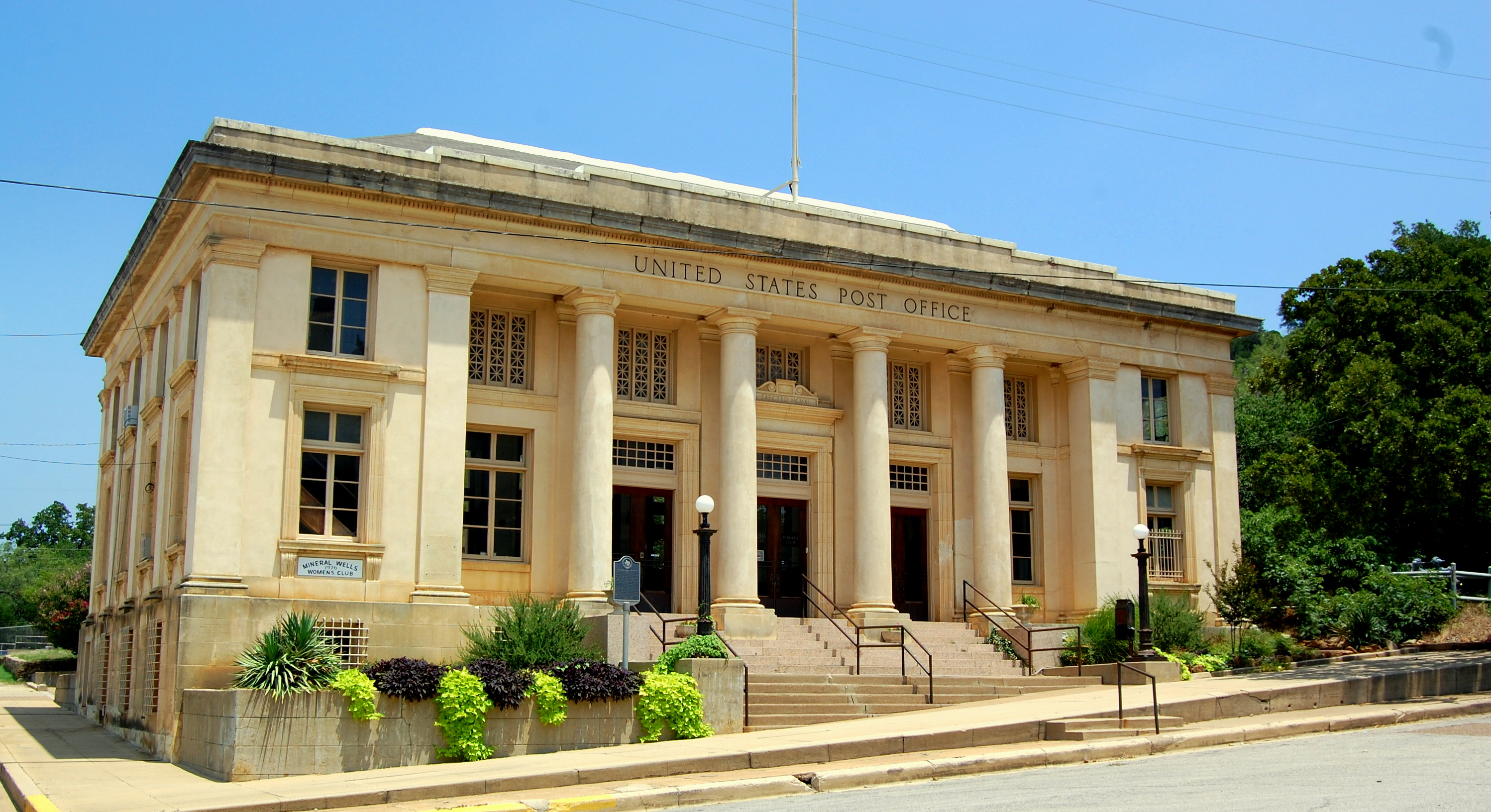
U.S. Post Office in Mineral Wells, Texas, 1911–1913

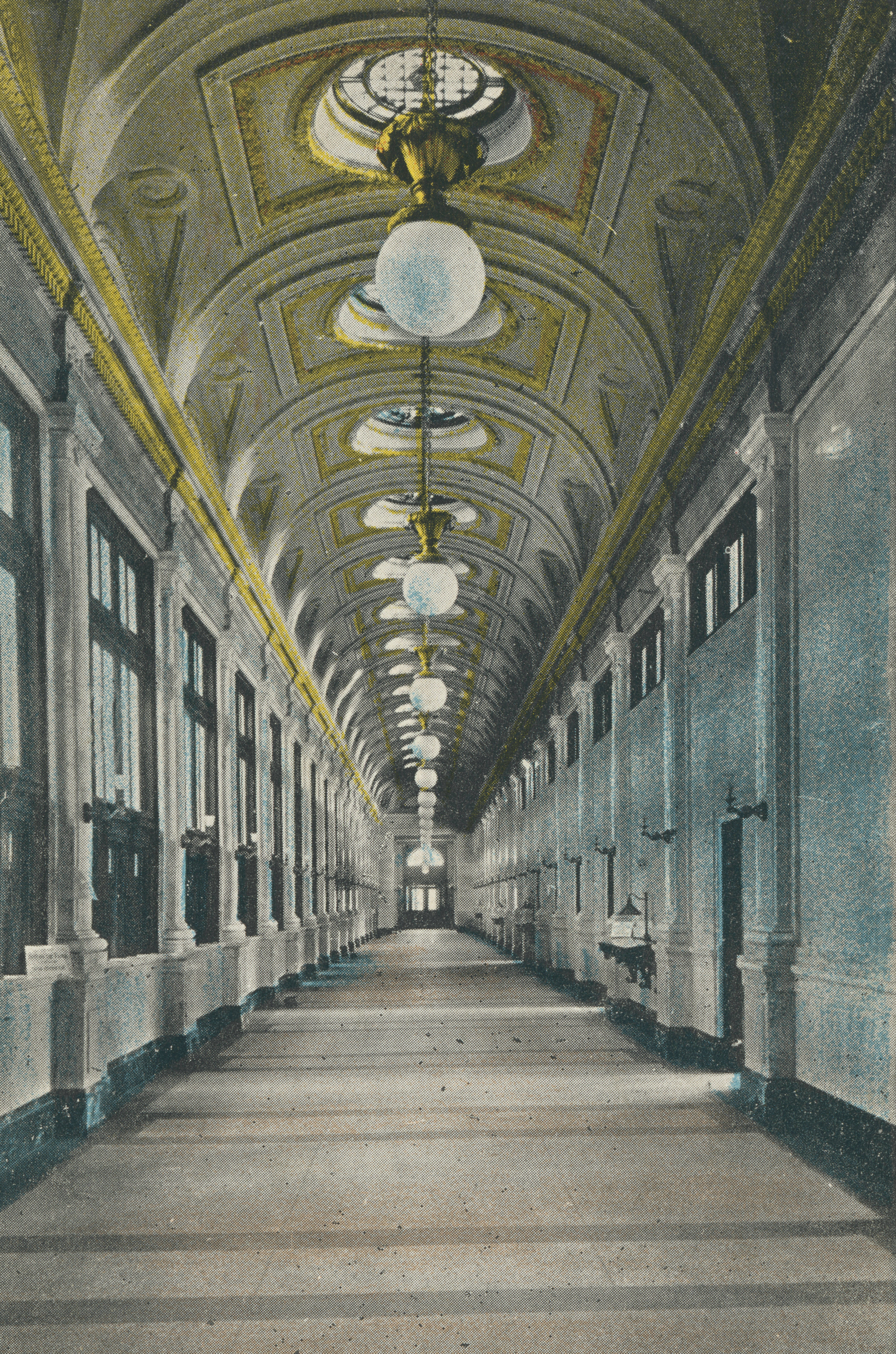
Interior of Post Office in Toledo, Ohio

Preceded by William Martin Aiken	Office of the Supervising Architect; 1897–1912	Succeeded by Oscar Wenderoth
