= Springbrook, Iowa =

- City
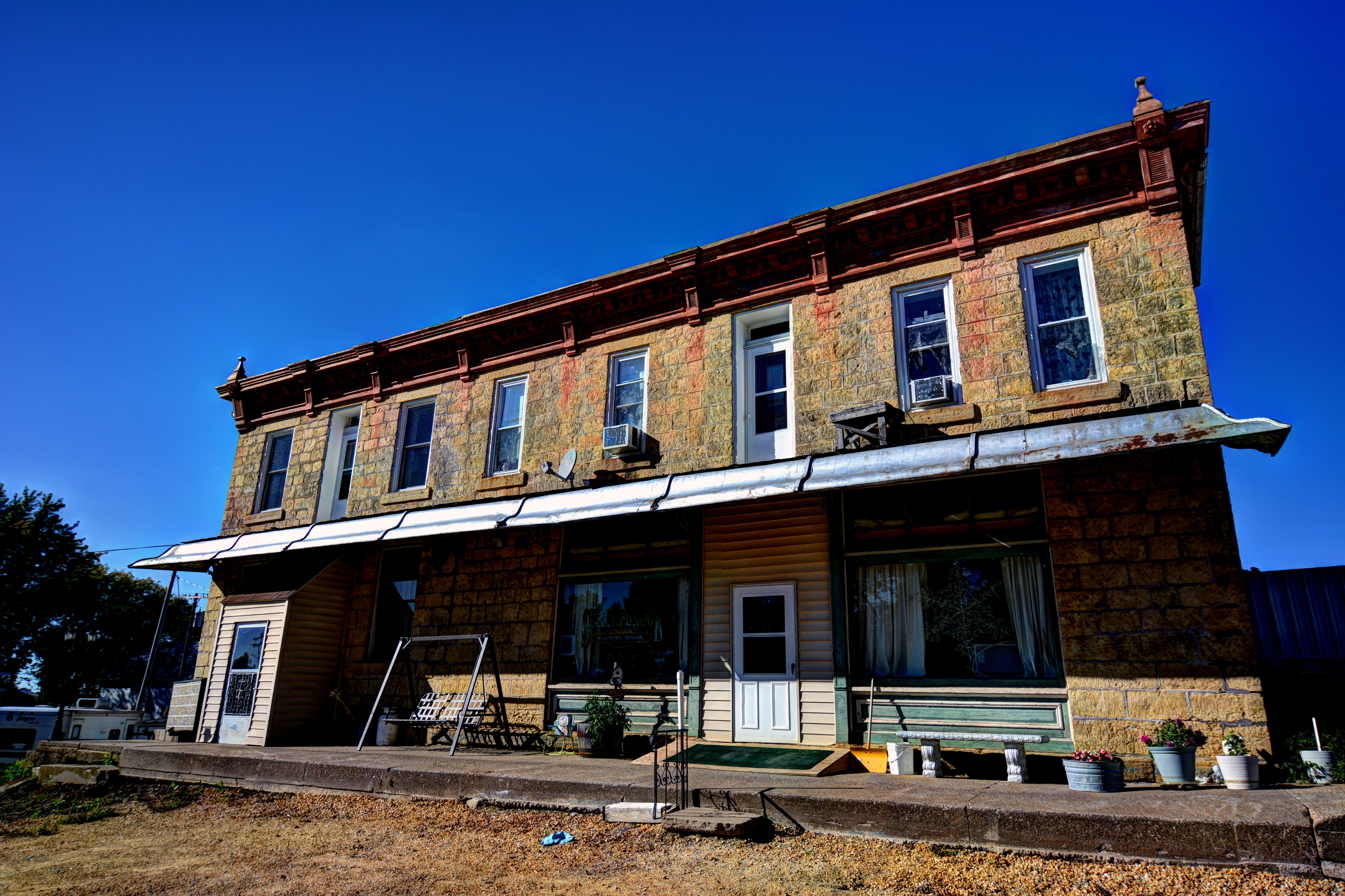
- Kegler Gonner Store and Post Office

- Location of Springbrook, Iowa
- Coordinates: 42°09′57″N 90°28′45″W
- Country: United States
- State: Iowa
- County: Jackson
- Incorporated: March 2, 1897

Area
  - Total: 0.61 sq mi (1.57 km^{2})
  - Land: 0.61 sq mi (1.57 km^{2})
  - Water: 0 sq mi (0.00 km^{2})
- Elevation: 824 ft (251 m)

Population (2020)
  - Total: 143
  - Density: 236.5/sq mi (91.33/km^{2})
- Time zone: UTC-6 (Central (CST))
  - Summer (DST): UTC-5 (CDT)
- ZIP code: 52075
- Area code: 563
- FIPS code: 19-74505
- GNIS feature ID: 2395939

Springbrook is a small city in central Jackson County, Iowa, United States. The population was 143 at the time of the 2020 census.

== Geography ==
According to the United States Census Bureau, the city has a total area of 0.60 square miles (1.55 km^{2}), all land.

== Demographics ==
Historical populations
Year	Pop.	±%
1900	107	—
1910	217	+102.8%
1920	126	−41.9%
1930	103	−18.3%
1940	131	+27.2%
1950	109	−16.8%
1960	139	+27.5%
1970	196	+41.0%
1980	209	+6.6%
1990	165	−21.1%
2000	182	+10.3%
2010	144	−20.9%
2020	143	−0.7%
Source:"U.S. Census website". United States Census Bureau. and Iowa Data Center; Source: U.S. Decennial Census

=== 2020 census ===
As of the census of 2020, there were 143 people, 65 households, and 46 families residing in the city. The population density was 237.6 inhabitants per square mile (91.7/km^{2}). There were 65 housing units at an average density of 108.0 per square mile (41.7/km^{2}). The racial makeup of the city was 96.5% White, 0.7% Black or African American, 0.0% Native American, 0.0% Asian, 0.0% Pacific Islander, 1.4% from other races and 1.4% from two or more races. Hispanic or Latino persons of any race comprised 0.0% of the population.

Of the 65 households, 35.4% of which had children under the age of 18 living with them, 55.4% were married couples living together, 6.2% were cohabitating couples, 23.1% had a female householder with no spouse or partner present and 15.4% had a male householder with no spouse or partner present. 29.2% of all households were non-families. 24.6% of all households were made up of individuals, 13.8% had someone living alone who was 65 years old or older.

The median age in the city was 43.9 years. 21.7% of the residents were under the age of 20; 6.3% were between the ages of 20 and 24; 22.4% were from 25 and 44; 23.1% were from 45 and 64; and 26.6% were 65 years of age or older. The gender makeup of the city was 50.3% male and 49.7% female.

=== 2010 census ===
As of the census of 2010, there were 144 people, 56 households, and 45 families living in the city. The population density was 240.0 inhabitants per square mile (92.7/km^{2}). There were 64 housing units at an average density of 106.7 per square mile (41.2/km^{2}). The racial makeup of the city was 100.0% White.

There were 56 households, of which 26.8% had children under the age of 18 living with them, 73.2% were married couples living together, 5.4% had a female householder with no husband present, 1.8% had a male householder with no wife present, and 19.6% were non-families. 16.1% of all households were made up of individuals, and 9% had someone living alone who was 65 years of age or older. The average household size was 2.57 and the average family size was 2.73.

The median age in the city was 44.8 years. 19.4% of residents were under the age of 18; 6.3% were between the ages of 18 and 24; 25.1% were from 25 to 44; 29.9% were from 45 to 64; and 19.4% were 65 years of age or older. The gender makeup of the city was 54.2% male and 45.8% female.

=== 2000 census ===
As of the census of 2000, there were 182 people, 60 households, and 51 families living in the city. The population density was 319.2 inhabitants per square mile (123.2/km^{2}). There were 62 housing units at an average density of 108.7 per square mile (42.0/km^{2}). The racial makeup of the city was 100.00% White. There were 60 households, out of which 41.7% had children under the age of 18 living with them, 75.0% were married couples living together, 5.0% had a female householder with no husband present, and 15.0% were non-families. 13.3% of all households were made up of individuals, and 6.7% had someone living alone who was 65 years of age or older. The average household size was 3.03 and the average family size was 3.25.

In the city, the population was spread out, with 29.7% under the age of 18, 7.7% from 18 to 24, 26.4% from 25 to 44, 19.8% from 45 to 64, and 16.5% who were 65 years of age or older. The median age was 38 years. For every 100 females, there were 100.0 males. For every 100 females age 18 and over, there were 100.0 males.

The median income for a household in the city was $50,750, and the median income for a family was $51,667. Males had a median income of $26,429 versus $17,813 for females. The per capita income for the city was $16,814. None of the population or families were below the poverty line.

== Public services ==
Springbrook is a small town and therefore does not have much in the way of city services.

Police protection is provided by the Jackson County Sheriff's Department.

Springbrook has a volunteer fire department which provides fire protection and EMS services. The department has 33 firefighters, and 15 non-firefighter volunteers. Equipment includes one engine, one tanker, one brush truck, one ambulance and one UTV. Bellevue ambulance service provides transporting ambulance services to Springbrook and the surrounding area.

== Education ==
Bellevue Community School District operates local area schools.
