= List of United States post offices in New York =

United States post offices operate under the authority of the United States Post Office Department (1792–1971) or the United States Postal Service (since 1971). Historically, post offices were usually placed in a prominent location and many were architecturally distinctive, including notable buildings featuring Beaux-Arts, Art Deco, and Vernacular architecture. However, modern U.S. post offices were generally designed for functionality rather than architectural style.

Following is a list of United States post offices in New York. Notable post offices include individual buildings, whether still in service or not, which have architectural, historical, or community-related significance. Many of these are listed on the National Register of Historic Places (NRHP) or state and local historic registers.

Post office	City	Date built	Image	Architect	Notes	Ref.
United States Post Office (Akron, New York)	Akron	1939		Louis A. Simon, Elizabeth Logan	(Note: Listed on the National Register of Historic Places)	
Old Post Office (Albany, New York)	Albany	1879		Edward Ogden, James G. Hill	(Note: No longer used as a post office)	
United States Post Office (Albion, New York)	Albion	1937		Louis A. Simon, Judson Smith		
United States Post Office (Amsterdam, New York)	Amsterdam	1935		Louis A. Simon		
United States Post Office (Angola, New York)	Angola	1938		Louis A. Simon		
United States Post Office (Attica, New York)	Attica	1936		Louis A. Simon		
Old Post Office and Courthouse (Auburn, New York)	Auburn	1890		Mifflin E. Bell		
United States Post Office (Batavia, New York)	Batavia	1919		James A. Wetmore	(Note: Contributing structure in the Genesee County Courthouse Historic District.)	
United States Post Office (Ballston Spa, New York)	Ballston	1936		Louis A. Simon		
United States Post Office (Bath, New York)	Bath	1931		James A. Wetmore		
United States Post Office (Bay Shore, New York)	Bay Shore			Louis A. Simon		
United States Post Office (Beacon, New York)	Beacon	1937		Gilbert Stanley Underwood		
United States Post Office (Boonville, New York)	Boonville	1937		Louis A. Simon		
Bronx General Post Office	Bronx	1935		Thomas Harlan Ellett		
United States Post Office (Morrisania, Bronx)	Bronx	1936		William Dewey Foster		
United States Post Office (Bronxville, New York)	Bronxville	1937		Eric Kebbon		
Federal Building and Post Office (Brooklyn)	Brooklyn	1933		James A. Wetmore, Mifflin E. Bell, William Alfred Freret		
United States Post Office (Bensonhurst, Brooklyn)	Brooklyn	1936		Carroll H. Pratt		
United States Post Office (Flatbush, Brooklyn)	Brooklyn	1936		Lorimer Rich		
United States Post Office (Kensington, Brooklyn)	Brooklyn	1935		Lorimer Rich		
United States Post Office (Williamsburg, Brooklyn)	Brooklyn	1936		Louis A. Simon		
Old Post Office (Buffalo, New York)	Buffalo	1897		James Knox Taylor		
United States Post Office (Canajoharie, New York)	Canajoharie	1937		Louis A. Simon		
United States Post Office (Canandaigua, New York)	Canadaigua	1910		Allen & Collens, Louis A. Simon		
United States Post Office (Canastota, New York)	Canastota	1940		Louis A. Simon		
United States Post Office (Canton, New York)	Canton	1936		Louis A. Simon		
United States Post Office (Carthage, New York)	Carthage	1934		Louis A. Simon		
United States Post Office (Catskill, New York)	Catskill	1935		E. P. Valkenburgh		
United States Post Office (Clyde, New York)	Clyde	1940		Louis A. Simon		
United States Post Office (Cooperstown, New York)	Cooperstown	1935		Louis A. Simon		
United States Post Office (Corning, New York)	Corning	1908		James Knox Taylor		
United States Post Office (Cortland, New York)	Cortland	1915		Oscar Wenderoth		
United States Post Office (Dansville, New York)	Dansville	1932		James A. Wetmore		
United States Post Office (Delhi, New York)	Delhi	1938		Louis A. Simon		
United States Post Office (Delmar, New York)	Delmar	1940		Louis A. Simon		
United States Post Office (Depew, New York)	Depew	1938		Louis A. Simon		
United States Post Office (Dobbs Ferry, New York)	Dobbs Ferry	1936		Louis A. Simon		
United States Post Office (Dolgeville, New York)	Dolgeville	1939		Louis A. Simon		
United States Post Office (Dunkirk, New York)	Dunkirk	1928		James A. Wetmore		
United States Post Office (East Rochester, New York)	East Rochester	1936		Louis A. Simon		
United States Post Office (Ellenville, New York)	Ellenville	1940		R. Stanley-Brown		
Old Platte Clove Post Office	Elka Park	1885		unknown		
United States Post Office (Endicott, New York)	Endicott	1936		Walter Whitlack		
United States Post Office (Far Rockaway, Queens)	Far Rockaway	1935		Eric Kebbon		
United States Post Office (Flushing, Queens)	Flushing	1932		Dwight James Baum, William W. Knowles		
United States Post Office (Forest Hills, Queens)	Forest Hills	1937		Lorimer Rich		
United States Post Office (Fort Plain, New York)	Fort Plain	1931		James A. Wetmore		
United States Post Office (Frankfort, New York)	Frankford	1940		Louis A. Simon		
United States Post Office (Fredonia, New York)	Fredonia	1935		Louis A. Simon		
United States Post Office (Freeport, New York)	Freeport	1932		Tachau and Vought		
United States Post Office (Frontenac, New York)	Frontenac	c. 1878				
United States Post Office (Fulton, New York)	Fulton	1912		James Knox Taylor		
United States Post Office (Garden City, New York)	Garden City	1936		Walker & Gillette		
United States Post Office (Geneva, New York)	Geneva	1905		James Knox Taylor		
Old Glen Cove Post Office	Glen Cove	1905		Stephen F. Voorhees		
United States Post Office (Glen Cove, New York)	Glen Cove	1932		Delano & Aldrich		
United States Post Office (Goshen, New York)	Goshen	1935–1936		E. P. Valkenburgh		
United States Post Office (Gouverneur, New York)	Gouverneur	1915–1917		James A. Wetmore		
United States Post Office (Granville, New York)	Granville	1935–1936		Louis A. Simon		
United States Post Office (Great Neck, New York)	Great Neck	1939		William Dewey Foster		
United States Post Office (Hamilton, New York)	Hamilton	1936		Louis A. Simon		
United States Post Office (Harrison, New York)	Harrison	1938		Louis A. Simon		
United States Post Office (Haverstraw, New York)	Haverstraw	1936		Louis A. Simon		
United States Post Office (Hempstead, New York)	Hempstead	1932		Tooker & Marsh		
United States Post Office (Herkimer, New York)	Herkimer	1933		Ross Edgar Sluyter		
United States Post Office (Homer, New York)	Homer	1937		Louis A. Simon		
United States Post Office (Honeoye Falls, New York)	Honeoye	1940		Louis A. Simon		
United States Post Office (Hoosick Falls, New York)	Hoosick	1925		James A. Wetmore, Louis A. Simon		
United States Post Office (Hornell, New York)	Hornell	1916		James A. Wetmore		
United States Post Office (Hudson, New York)	Hudson	1916		James A. Wetmore		
United States Post Office (Hudson Falls, New York)	Hudson Falls	1936		Louis A. Simon		
United States Post Office (Hyde Park, New York)	Hyde Park	1941		Rudolph Stanley-Brown		
United States Post Office (Ilion, New York)	Ilion	1935		Louis A. Simon		
United States Post Office (Ithaca, New York)	Ithaca	1909		James Knox Taylor		
United States Post Office (Jackson Heights, Queens)	Jackson	1936		Benjamin C. Flournoy		
United States Post Office (Jamaica, Queens)	Jamaica	1932		Cross & Cross		
United States Post Office (Johnson City, New York)	Johnson City	1934		Louis A. Simon		
United States Post Office (Johnstown, New York)	Johnstown	1913		James Knox Taylor		
United States Post Office (Lake George, New York)	Lake George	1940		Louis A. Simon		
United States Post Office (Lake Placid, New York)	Lake Placid	1935		Louis A. Simon		
United States Post Office (Lancaster, New York)	Lancaster	1938		Louis A. Simon		
United States Post Office (Larchmont, New York)	Larchmont	1937		William Dewey Foster		
United States Post Office (Le Roy, New York)	Le Roy	1938		James Arnold		
United States Post Office (Little Falls, New York)	Little Falls	1907		James Knox Taylor		
United States Post Office (Little Valley, New York)	Little Valley	1941		Louis A. Simon		
United States Post Office (Lockport, New York)	Lockport	1902–1904		James Knox Taylor		
United States Post Office (Long Island City, Queens)	Long Island City	1928		James A. Wetmore		
United States Post Office (Lyons, New York)	Lyons	1931		James A. Wetmore		
United States Post Office (Malone, New York)	Malone	1934		Louis A. Simon		
U.S. General Post Office (now James A. Farley Building)	Manhattan, New York City	1911–1914		McKim, Mead & White		
U.S. Post Office-Church Street Station, now 90 Church Street	Manhattan, New York CIty	1934–1935		Cross & Cross; Pennington, Lewis & Mills; Louis A. Simon		
United States Post Office (Medina, New York)	Medina	1931		James A. Wetmore		
United States Post Office (Middleburgh, New York)	Middleburgh	1939–1940		Louis A. Simon		
United States Post Office (Middleport, New York)	Middleport	1940		Louis A. Simon		
United States Post Office (Mineola, New York)	Mineola	1936		Peabody, Wilson & Brown		
United States Post Office (Mount Vernon, New York)	Mount Vernon	1915		Oscar Wenderoth		
United States Post Office (New Rochelle, New York)	New Rochelle	1937		Hart & Shape		
United States Post Office (Canal Street Station)	New York City	1937		Alan Balch Mills		
United States Post Office (Cooper Station)	New York City	1937		William Dewey Foster		
United States Post Office Inwood Station	New York City	1935–1937		Carroll H. Pratt		
United States Post Office (Knickerbocker Station)	New York City	1935–1937		William Dewey Foster		
United States Post Office–Lenox Hill Station	New York City	1935		Eric Kebbon		
United States Post Office (Madison Square Station)	New York City	1937		Lorimer Rich		
United States Post Office (Old Chelsea Station)	New York City	1935		Eric Kebbon		
United States Post Office (Newark, New York)	Newark	1911		James Knox Taylor		
United States Post Office (Newburgh, New York)	Newburgh	1930–1931		James A. Wetmore		
United States Post Office (Newtonville, New York)	Newtonville	1852		unknown		
United States Post Office (Niagara Falls, New York)	Niagara Falls	1906		James Knox Taylor, James A. Wetmore		
United States Post Office (North Tonawanda, New York)	North Tonawanda	1912		Oscar Wenderoth		
United States Post Office (Northport, New York)	Northport	1936		Louis A. Simon		
United States Post Office (Norwich, New York)	Norwich	1932		George Ketcham		
United States Post Office (Nyack, New York)	Nyack	1932		James A. Wetmore		
United States Post Office (Ogdensburg, New York)	Ogdensburg	1867–1870		Alfred B. Mullett		
United States Post Office (Olean, New York)	Olean	1910–1912		James Knox Taylor		
United States Post Office (Oneida, New York)	Oneida	1931		James A. Wetmore		
Old Post Office (Oneonta, New York)	Oneonta	1915		Oscar Wenderoth		
United States Post Office (Owego, New York)	Owego	1919		Oscar Wenderoth		
United States Post Office (Oxford, New York)	Oxford	1939		Louis A. Simon		
United States Post Office (Oyster Bay, New York)	Oyster Bay	1935–1936		William Bottomley		
United States Post Office (Painted Post, New York)	Painted Post	1937–1938		Louis A. Simon		
United States Post Office (Patchogue, New York)	Patchogue	1932		John Vredenburgh Van Pelt		
United States Post Office (Pearl River, New York)	Pearl River	1935		Louis A. Simon		
United States Post Office (Peekskill, New York)	Peeksill	1931		James A. Wetmore		
United States Post Office (Penn Yan, New York)	Penn Yan	1912		James Knox Taylor		
United States Post Office (Port Chester, New York)	Port Chester	1932		Zoller and Muller		
United States Post Office (Port Jervis, New York)	Port Jervis	1914– 1916		Oscar Wenderoth		
United States Post Office (Potsdam, New York)	Potsdam	1932		James A. Wetmore		
United States Post Office (Poughkeepsie, New York)	Poughkeepsie	1937–1939		Eric Kebbon		
United States Post Office (Rhinebeck, New York)	Rhinebeck	1940		R. Stanley-Brown		
O'Brien General Store and Post Office	Rhinecliff	c. 1860s		unknown		
United States Post Office (Richfield Springs, New York)	Richfield	1941		Louis A. Simon		
United States Post Office (Riverhead, New York)	Riverhead	1935		Louis A. Simon		
United States Post Office (Rockville Centre, New York)	Rockville Centre	1937		William Dewey Foster		
United States Post Office (Rye, New York)	Rye	1935		Louis A. Simon		
United States Post Office (Saratoga Springs, New York)	Saratoga Springs	1910		James Knox Taylor		
United States Post Office (Scarsdale, New York)	Scarsdale	1937		Schultze & Weaver		
United States Post Office (Schenectady, New York)	Schenectady	1912		James Knox Taylor		
United States Post Office (Scotia, New York)	Scotia	1939–1940		Louis A. Simon		
United States Post Office (Seneca Falls, New York)	Seneca Falls	1932		James A. Wetmore		
United States Post Office (Spring Valley, New York)	Spring Valley	1936		Louis A. Simon		
United States Post Office (Springville, New York)	Springville	1936		Louis A. Simon		
United States Post Office (St. Johnsville, New York)	St. Johnsville	1936		Louis A. Simon		
United States Post Office (Suffern, New York)	Suffern	1936		Louis A. Simon		
United States Post Office (Ticonderoga, New York)	Ticonderoga	1936–1937		Louis A. Simon		
United States Post Office (Tonawanda, New York)	Tonawanda	1939		Louis A. Simon		
United States Post Office (Troy, New York)	Troy	1934–1936		Louis A. Simon		
United States Post Office (Walton, New York)	Walton	1936–1937		Louis A. Simon		
US Post Office of Wappingers Falls	Wappingers Falls	1940		R. Stanley-Brown		
United States Post Office (Warsaw, New York)	Warsaw	1934		Louis A. Simon		
United States Post Office (Waterloo, New York)	Waterloo	1924		James A. Wetmore		
United States Post Office (Watkins Glen, New York)	Watkins Glen	1934–1935		Louis A. Simon		
United States Post Office (Waverly, New York)	Waverly, New York	1936–1937		Louis A. Simon		
United States Post Office (Wellsville, New York)	Wellsville	1931–1933		Murphy & Olmsted		
United States Post Office (Westhampton Beach, New York)	Westhampton Beach			Louis A. Simon		
United States Post Office (Whitehall, New York)	Whitehall	1937–1938		Louis A. Simon		
United States Post Office (Yonkers, New York)	Yonkers	1927		James A. Wetmore		
