= List of United States post office murals in New York =

Following is a list of United States post office murals created in New York between 1934 and 1943.

Location	Mural title	Image	Artist	Date	Notes	NRHPlisted
Akron	Horse-Drawn Railroad		Elizabeth Logan	1941	tempera	yes
Albany			Ethel M. Parsons	1935	oil on canvas, map-style ceiling murals at James T. Foley United States Courthouse depicting the U.S., the continents, and Earth's geographical poles	
Albion	Along the Barge Canal		Judson Smith	1939	oil on canvas	yes
Amsterdam	Departure of a Packet Boat		Henry Schnakenberg	1939	oil on canvas	yes
Amsterdam	Sir William Johnson Conferring with the Indians		Henry Schnakenberg	1939	oil on canvas	yes
Attica	Fall in the Genesse Country		Thomas Donnelly	1938	oil on canvas	yes
Baldwinsville	Gateway to the West		Paul Weller	1941	oil on canvas	
Beacon	Views of Mid-Hudson Region		Charles Rosen	1937	oil on canvas	yes
Binghamton	Communication		Kenneth Washburn	1938	oil on canvas Eight murals	
Boonville	The Black River Canal – 1845		Lucerne McCullough	1939	oil on canvas	
Boonville	The Black River Canal – 1845		Suzanne McCullough	1939	oil on canvas	
Bronxville	The Arrival of the First Mail in Bronxville, 1846		John Sloan	1939	oil on canvas	yes
Canajoharie	Invention of a Paper Bag in Canajoharie		Anatol Shulkin	1942	oil on canvas	yes
Canastota	The Onion Fields		Alison Mason Kingsbury	1942	tempera on canvas	yes
Clyde	Apple Pickers		Thomas Donnelly	1941	oil on canvas	yes
Delhi	Down-Rent War, Around 1845		Mary Earley	1940	Winner of the 48-State Mural Competition	yes
Delmar	The Indian Ladder		Sol Wilson	1940		yes
Depew	Beginning of the Day	Depew Post Office mural	Anne Poor	1941	oil on canvas	yes
Dolgeville	Underground Railroad		James Michael Newell	1940	fresco	yes
East Rochester	Recreation Hours		Bernard Gussow	1938	oil on canvas	yes
Ellenville	Establishment of First Post Office in Ellenville in 1823		Louis Bouche	1942	oil on canvas	yes
Endicott	Endicott, 1901 – Excavating for the Ideal Factory		S. Douglass Crockwell	1938	oil on canvas	yes
Fort Edward	Lock on the Champlain Canal, Fort Edward		George A. Picken	1938	oil on canvas	
Fredonia	The Harvest		Arnold Blanch	1937	oil on canvas	yes
Freeport	Air Mail		William Gropper	1938	oil on canvas	yes
Freeport	Suburban Post in Winter		William Gropper	1938	oil on canvas	yes
Fulton	Father LeMoyne Trying to Convert the Indians on Pathfinders Island		Caroline S. Rohland	1942	oil on canvas	yes
Garden City	Huckleberry Frolic		J. Theodore Johnson	1937	oil on canvas	yes
Goshen	The Running of the Hambletonian Stakes		Georgina Klitgaard	1937		yes
Harrison	Early Days of the Automobile		Harold Goodwin	1941	oil on canvas	yes
Hempstead	Hempstead Settlers in 1640		Peppino Mangravite	1937	oil on canvas	yes
Hempstead	The English Dirigible R-34 Delivering Mail to the United States in Hempstead Field in 1919		Peppino Mangravite	1937	oil on canvas	yes
Homer	Albany Street Bridge		Frank Romanelli	1940		yes
Honeoye Falls	The Life of the Senecas		Stuart Edie	1942	oil on canvas	yes
Hudson Falls	Scenes and Activities of Hudson		George A. Picken	1937	oil on canvas	yes
Huntington	Huntington Harbor		Paul C. Chapman	1939	oil on canvas	
Hyde Park	Professions and Industries of Hyde Park		Olin Dows	1941		yes
Johnson City	Scenes of post service, local industries, and other activities typical of the community		Frederick Knight	1937		yes
Lake George	Lake George		Judson Smith	1942		yes
Lake Placid	Scenes of winter sports		Henry Billings	1937	oil on canvas	yes
Lancaster	Early Commerce in the Erie Canal Region		Arthur Getz	1940	oil on canvas	yes
Long Beach	The Pleasures of the Bathing Beach		Jon Corbino	1939	oil on canvas	yes
Middleburgh	Dance of the Hop Pickers		Mary Earley	1941	oil and tempera	yes
Middleport	Rural Highway		Marianne Appel	1941	oil on canvas	yes
Mount Kisco	Indian Cornfield		Thomas Donnelly	1936	oil on canvas	
Mount Kisco	Mount Kisco in 1850		Thomas Donnelly	1936	oil on canvas	
New Rochelle	The Huguenots Lay the Foundations of the City of New Rochelle		David Hutchison	1940	oil on canvas	yes
New Rochelle	John Pell Receives Partial Payment for 6,000 Acres		David Hutchison	1940	oil on canvas	yes
New Rochelle	The Post Rider Brings News of the Battle of Lexington		David Hutchison	1940	oil on canvas	yes
New York City; Bronx; General Post Office	Resources of America		Ben Shahn	1939	thirteen panels, egg tempera on plaster	yes
New York City; Bronx; General Post Office	Resources of America		Bernarda Bryson Shahn	1939	thirteen panels, egg tempera on plaster	yes
New York City; Bronx; General Post Office	Washington and the Battle of the Bronx		Irving A. Block	1942	oil on canvas	yes
New York City; Bronx; General Post Office	Washington and the Battle of the Bronx		Abraham Lishinsky	1942	oil on canvas	yes
New York City; Manhattan; General Post Office	The Triborough Bridge in Process of Construction		Louis Lozowick		oil on canvas	
New York City; Manhattan; General Post Office	The Triborough Bridge in Process of Construction		Joseph Kaplan		oil on canvas	
New York City; Manhattan; General Post Office	Sky Line and Waterfront Traffic as Seen from Manhattan Bridge		Louis Lozowick		oil on canvas	
New York City; Manhattan; General Post Office	Sky Line and Waterfront Traffic as Seen from Manhattan Bridge		Joseph Kaplan		oil on canvas	
New York City; Manhattan; Madison Square Station	Scenes of New York		Kindred McLeary	1939	eight panels, tempera on plaster, started 1937	yes
New York City; Queens; Jackson Heights Station	Development of Jackson Heights		Peppino Mangravite	1940	oil on canvas	yes
New York City; Queens; Woodhaven Station	The First Amendment		Ben Shahn	1941		
Nyack	Scenes of local history in the colonial period		Jacob Getlar Smith	1936		yes
Nyack	Scenes of local history in the colonial period		Jacob Pelzman	1936		yes
Oxford	Family Reunion on Clark Island, Spring 1791		Mordi Gassner	1941	tempera	yes
Oyster Bay	Scenes of local history		Ernest Peixotto	1937		yes
Oyster Bay	Scenes of local history		Arthur Sturges	1937		yes
Oyster Bay	Allegory of North America receiving mail from world		Ernest Peixotto	1936		yes
Oyster Bay	Allegory of North America receiving mail from world		Arthur Sturges	1936		yes
Painted Post	Recording the Victory		Amy Jones	1939		yes
Port Chester			Domenico Mortellito	1936	four large murals and nine lunettes depicting dock workers, millowners, tool, anddie workers and the Life Savers Building	yes
Port Washington	Lighthouse		Harry S. Lane	1937	oil on canvas	
Port Washington	Sailing		Harry S. Lane	1937	oil on canvas	
Port Washington	Landscape		Harry S. Lane	1937	oil on canvas	
Poughkeepsie	Indian Resting Spot		Gerald Foster	1939	A 1690 scene at the "reed covered lodge at the spring place" (Poughkeepsie) where Indian messengers customarily met	yes
Poughkeepsie	The Ratification Convention in 1788		Gerald Foster	1939	A 1690 scene at the "reed covered lodge at the spring place" (Poughkeepsie) where Indian messengers customarily met	yes
Poughkeepsie	Old Poughkeepsie		Gerald Foster	1939	A 1690 scene at the "reed covered lodge at the spring place" (Poughkeepsie) where Indian messengers customarily met	yes
Poughkeepsie	View of Poughkeepsie in 1840		Georgina Klitgaard	1940		yes
Poughkeepsie	Contemporary View of Poughkeepsie from the River		Charles Rosen	1940		yes
Rhinebeck	Scenes of local history	WPA mural in the Rhinebeck, NY post office	Olin Dows	1940	oil on canvas	yes
Richfield Springs	Local landscape		John W. Taylor	1942	oil on canvas	yes
Rockville Centre	Scenes of local history		Victor White	1939	oil on canvas, four panels	yes
Rome	Barn Raising		Wendell Jones	1942	oil on canvas	
Rye	John Jay at His Home		Guy Pene du Bois	1938		yes
St. Johnsville	Mohawk Valley – Early St. Johnsville Pioneers		Jirayr H. Zorthian	1940	oil on canvas	yes
Saratoga Springs	Saratoga in Racing Season		Guy Pène du Bois	1937	two panels	
Scarsdale	Caleb Heathcote Buys the Richbell Farm		Gordon Samstag	1940	oil on canvas	yes
Scarsdale	Law and Order in Old Scarsdale Manor		Gordon Samstag	1940	oil on canvas	yes
Scotia	The Glen Family Spared by French and Indians – 1690		Amy Jones	1941	tempera	yes
Spring Valley	Waiting for the Mail		Stephen Etnier	1938	oil on canvas	yes
Springville	Fiddler’s Green		Victoria Hutson Huntley	1938	oil on canvas	yes
Ticonderoga	The Exhortation of Ethan Allen		Frederick Massa	1940	oil on canvas	yes
Troy	Legends of the Hudson		Waldo Peirce	1938	oil on canvas	yes
Troy	Rip Van Winkle		Waldo Peirce	1938	oil on canvas	yes
Waverly	Spanish Hill and the Early Inhabitants of the Vicinity		Musa McKim	1939	oil on canvas	yes
Westhampton Beach	Outdoor Sports		Sol Wilson	1942	oil on canvas	yes
Whitehall	Settlement of Skenesborough		Axel Horn	1940	oil on canvas	yes
