= United States Post Office (Riverhead, New York) =

- US Post Office — Riverhead
- U.S. National Register of Historic Places
- The former post office in 2008

- Location within New York Location within the United States
- Location: 23 West Second Street, Riverhead, NY
- Coordinates: 40°55′6″N 72°39′50″W
- Built: 1935
- Architect: Louis A. Simon, U.S. Treasury Department
- Architectural style: Colonial Revival
- MPS: US Post Offices in New York State, 1858-1943, TR
- NRHP reference No.: 88002424
- Added to NRHP: May 11, 1989

The old Riverhead Post Office was a United States post office located at 23 West Second Street in Riverhead, New York. It served the ZIP code 11901, covering all of Riverhead, along with Roanoke, Reeves Park, Centerville, northern Jamesport, and northwestern Laurel. The current Riverhead Post Office is located at 1210 West Main Street.

The old Riverhead Post Office was designed by Louis A. Simon who was Supervising Architect for the United States Treasury Department. Simon also designed the Post Office buildings in Bay Shore, Northport, and Westhampton Beach. According to the Riverhead Town Historian, the land for the Post Office was purchased in 1932, with the building erected in 1935 and dedicated in November of that year. The post office was a depression-era public works project. It is built in a simplified Colonial Revival style.

As with Patchogue and Smithtown's Village of the Branch, the old Riverhead Post Office was known as a source for obscure postal denominations by Long Island-based stamp collectors. The building was added to the National Register of Historic Places in 1989. The old post office building is currently home to professional suites.

On September 27, 2010, the new Riverhead Post Office building located on Main Street was named in honor of Riverhead native and Medal of Honor recipient Garfield M. Langhorn by the 111th United States Congress.
