= United States Post Office (Pearl River, New York) =

- U.S. Post Office
- U.S. National Register of Historic Places
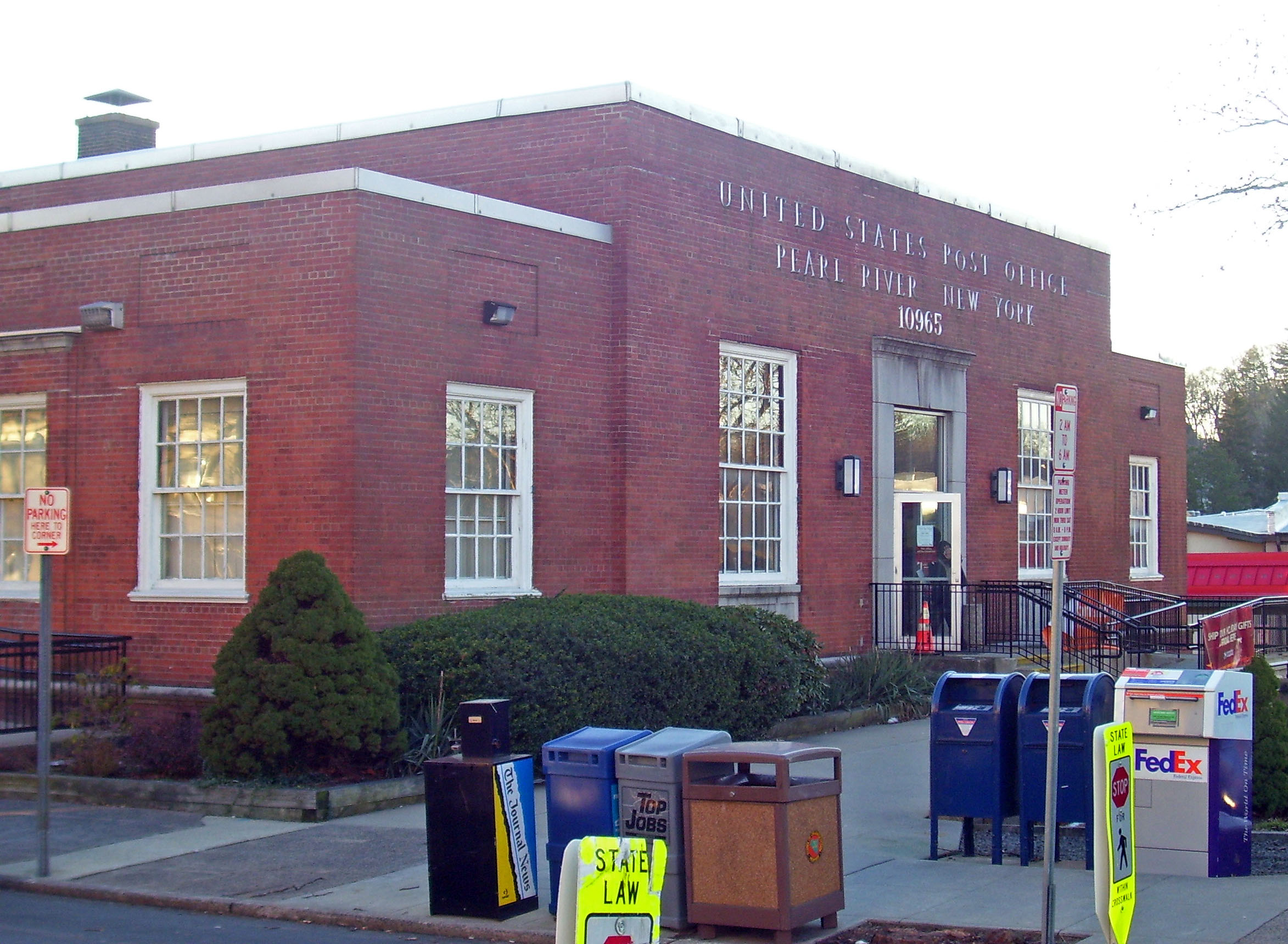
- Partial east profile and north elevation, 2008

- Location within New York Location within the United States
- Location: 35 S. Main St., Pearl River, NY
- Coordinates: 41°3′28″N 74°1′19″W
- Area: less than one acre
- Built: 1935
- Architect: Louis A. Simon
- Architectural style: Colonial Revival
- MPS: US Post Offices in New York State, 1858-1943, TR
- NRHP reference No.: 88002399
- Added to NRHP: November 17, 1988

The U.S. Post Office in Pearl River, New York, is located at the junction of Franklin Avenue and South Main Street in the hamlet's downtown. It is a brick building from the mid-1930s, serving the ZIP Code 10965, which covers the hamlet of Pearl River.

Its design, an application of the Colonial Revival architectural style commonly used for post offices of that era, is unique to it. It shows a strong modernist influence, with almost no ornament on its exterior, and no public art inside.

In 1988 it was listed on the National Register of Historic Places with many other contemporary post offices in the state, including four others in Rockland County. Congress renamed the building the Heinz Ahlmeyer, Jr. Post Office Building in 2005, in honor of a local soldier missing in action and presumed dead during the Vietnam War until that year, when his remains were identified.

== Building ==
The post office is located on the west side of Main Street, just south of its junction with Franklin Avenue on the east. It is oriented east-west, with its north (front) elevation facing the parking lot for the train station to its northwest. Across the parking lot to the north is Pearl River's town square; commercial buildings line its east side. The terrain slopes enough down to the railroad tracks to the west, exposing the post office's foundation on that side. On the other side of the tracks is a large industrial complex.

The building itself is a one-story, five-by-five-bay steel frame structure with a concrete terrace surrounding the exposed basement portions of the foundation on the west. It consists of a three-bay central pavilion with two recessed one-bay wings on either side. A loading dock with canopy projects from the south into the postal vehicle parking lot. All three sections have a flat roof, with the central pavilion's slightly higher than the wings. They are faced in brick laid in common bond.

A molded cast stone water table surrounds the building at floor level. Windows are 15-over-15 double-hung sash on the pavilion and eight-over-eight on the wings, with cast stone sills. The latter have recessed panels above them. Rooflines are marked by stone coping sheathed in aluminum. On the east facade, facing Main Street, a second entrance for employees was installed in a section with a slight projecting cast stone cornice.

On the pavilion facade the windows rest on two cast stone panels. The main entrance between them has a cast stone surround with keystone and denticulated cornice. Above them, large bronze letters spell out "UNITED STATES POST OFFICE PEARL RIVER NEW YORK 10965" in the entablature.

Two flights of stone stairs and a wheelchair ramp to the west lead to the main entrance, a glazed modern aluminum door with large single-light transom above. It opens into a wooden vestibule. The lobby takes four of the five bays. It has terrazzo flooring, a tall ceramic tile dado and a foliate plaster cornice. Acoustic tiles cover the original plaster ceiling; modern fluorescent lighting and ceiling fans hang from them.

The customer tables and grilles over the teller windows are also original. The teller windows themselves have been combined into one large service window. In the northwest corner is the postmaster's office; the rear of the building is given over to workspace.

== History ==
Pearl River's first post office was established in 1872. For most of the rest of the 19th century, it was one of the few buildings in the center of the village on the New York and New Jersey Railroad, later part of the New York and Erie Railroad network. Suburban development began in the early 20th century.

A 1931 amendment to the Public Buildings Act passed by Congress five years earlier authorized the construction of a new post office in Pearl River and many other communities, in order to relieve the economic hardship of the Great Depression. Work did not begin until 1935; it was completed the following year.

As with many other post offices built at that time, the design was by Louis A. Simon, Treasury Department Supervising Architect. The Colonial Revival style used was also increasingly standard for post offices in smaller communities of that era. The basic form of the building, its wide central projecting pavilion and narrow wings, is shared by other post offices in New York, including those in Moravia and Watkins Glen.

It differs from other post offices in that style and shape by reducing the former to essential elements. Without much decoration, it is identifiable as a Colonial Revival building through the basic symmetry of its arrangement of multi-paned windows and stone entrance surround. The flat roofs, absence of cornices and simple features of the main entrance suggest the influence of the Streamline Moderne and Art Deco movements of the time, which postal architects were increasingly acknowledging in the late 1930s.

In the 1960s, at various times, the loading dock was extended, its canopy added, and the side entrance reconfigured. Inside the original lighting was replaced. Later in the 20th century the wheelchair ramp was added to comply with the Americans with Disabilities Act. There have been no other changes to the building.

In 2005, U.S. Representative Eliot Engel, whose district includes Pearl River, introduced a bill in Congress to officially rename the post office after Heinz Ahlmeyer, a native who had joined the Marine Corps as a second lieutenant after graduating from SUNY New Paltz. On Ahlmeyer's first day of service in Vietnam in 1967, leading a Long Range Reconnaissance Patrol unit along the Ho Chi Minh Trail near Khe Sanh, he was reported to have been killed; however, due to heavy small arms fire his body could not be retrieved at that time. They were identified in 2005 and he was buried with full honors at Arlington Cemetery. It became the second Register-listed post office in the county to be named in honor of a deceased local resident, after the 2004 renaming of the Nyack post office in memory of police officers slain in the 1981 Brinks robbery.

== See also ==
- National Register of Historic Places listings in Rockland County, New York
