= United States Post Office (Cortland, New York) =

- US Post Office-Cortland
- U.S. National Register of Historic Places
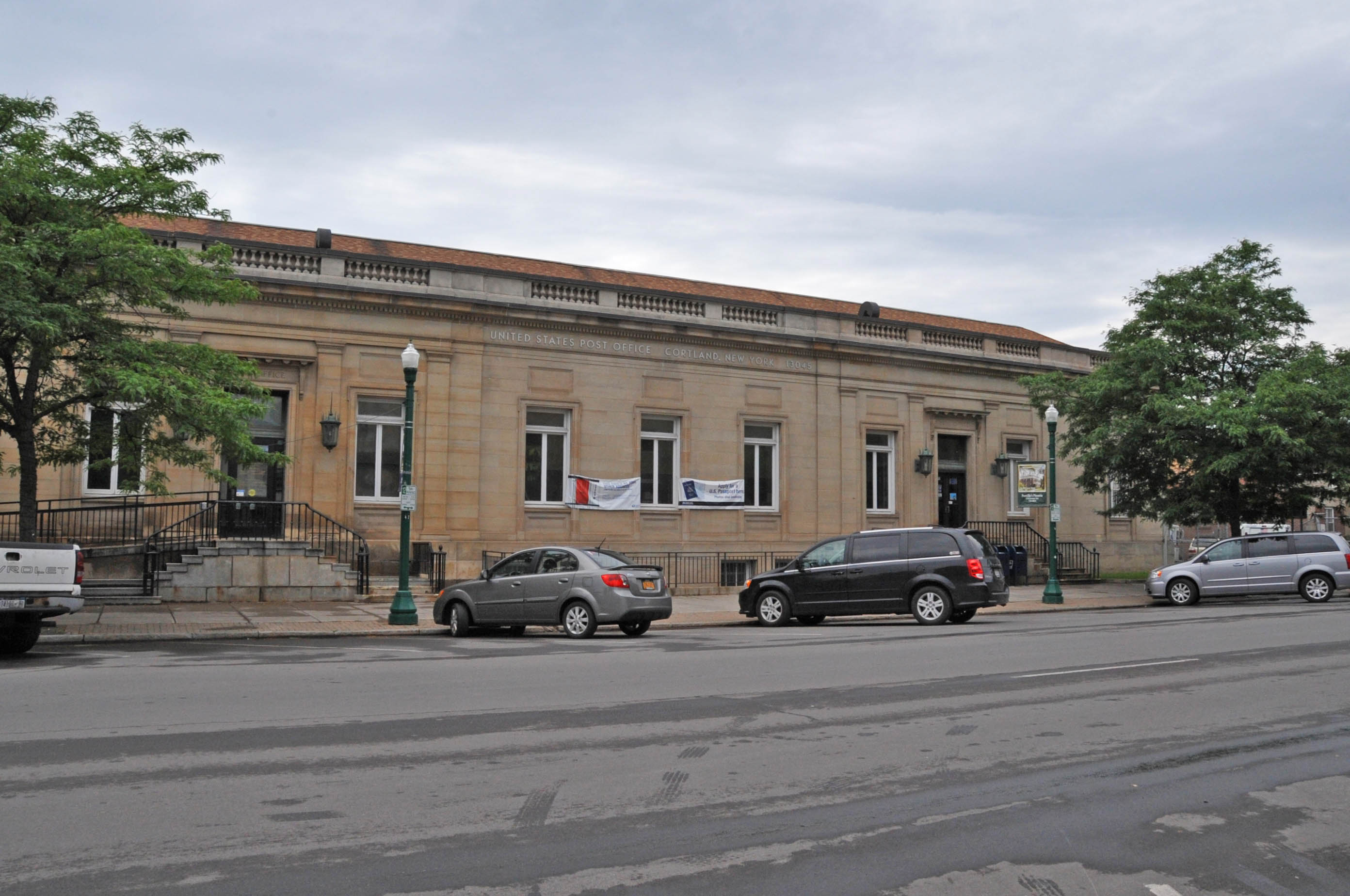

- Location within New York Location within the United States
- Location: 88 Main St., Cortland, New York
- Coordinates: 42°35′54″N 76°10′51″W
- Area: less than one acre
- Built: 1915
- Architect: Wenderoth, Oscar; Ludins, Ryah
- Architectural style: Classical Revival, Neoclassical
- MPS: US Post Offices in New York State, 1858-1943, TR
- NRHP reference No.: 88002475
- Added to NRHP: November 17, 1988

United States Post Office (Courtland, New York) is a historic post office building located at 88 Main Street in Cortland in Cortland County, New York. The Neoclassical style building was designed by Oscar Wenderoth in 1913. The post office was added to the National Register of Historic Places in 1988. It is still a functioning post office.

== History ==
The first post office in Cortland, New York was established in May 1814. The United States Post Office (Courtland, New York) was built between 1913 and 1915 and was enlarged between 1940 and 1941 as part of the New Deal federal program. It is located at 88 Main Street in Corland, New York.

It is one of several post offices in New York state designed by Oscar Wenderot of the Office of the Supervising Architect of the United States Department of Treasury,

The United States Post Office (Courtland, New York) was listed on the National Register of Historic Places on November 17, 1988. It is still a functioning post office.

== Architecture ==
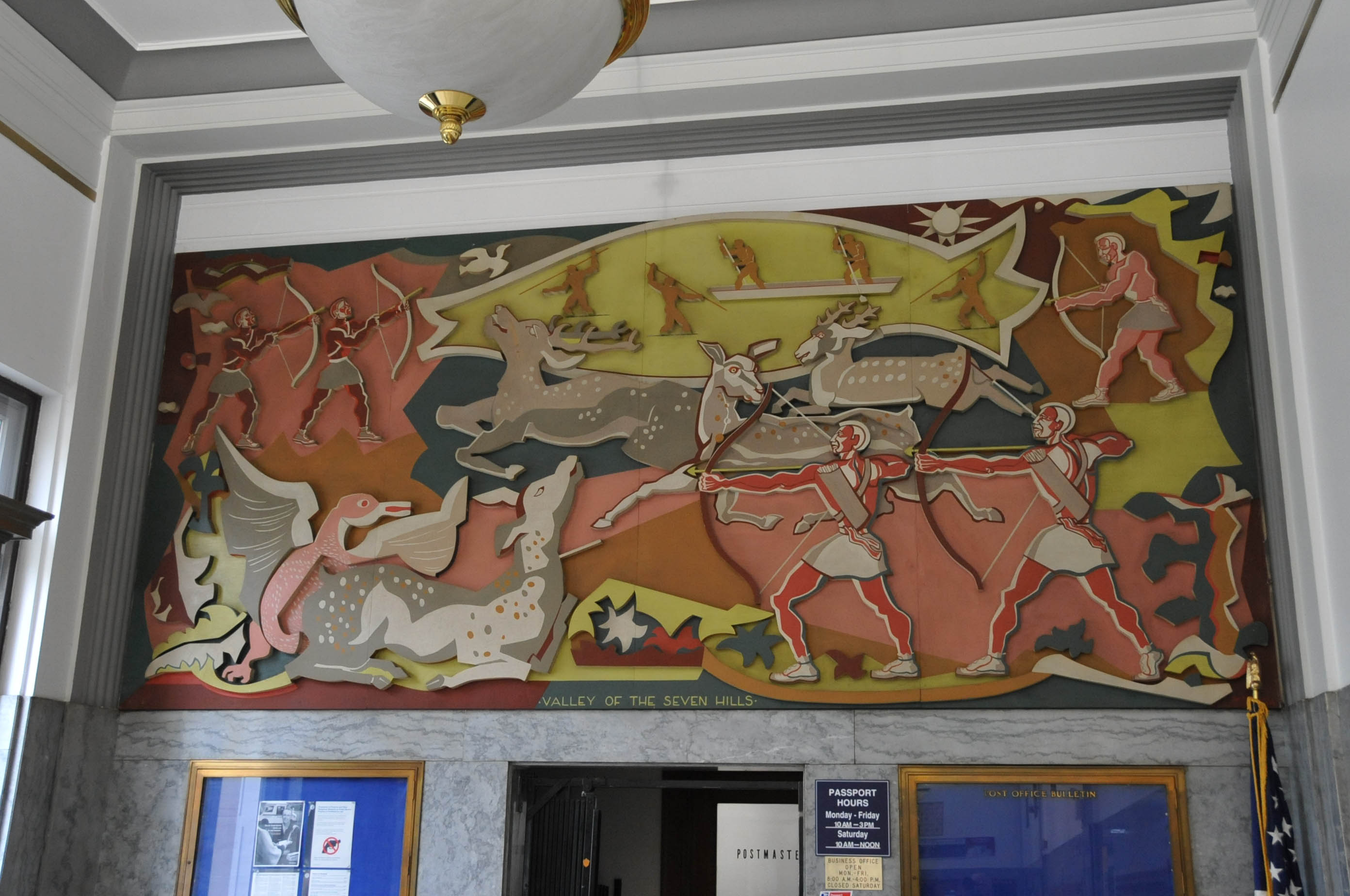
Valley of the Seven Hills

The United States Post Office (Cortland, New York) is a two-story rectangular building that was designed by Oscar Wenderot in the Neoclassical style. The building is supported by brick and concrete. Its brick foundation is clad in granite. The building's façade is covered in coursed ashlar limestone.

The post office's lobby features Valley of the Seven Hills, a wood relief mural created by painter Ryah Ludins in 1942 and installed in 1943. This was created as a Works Progress Administration project.

== See also ==
- List of United States post offices in New York
- List of United States post office murals in New York
