= Wheeler Williams =

American sculptor

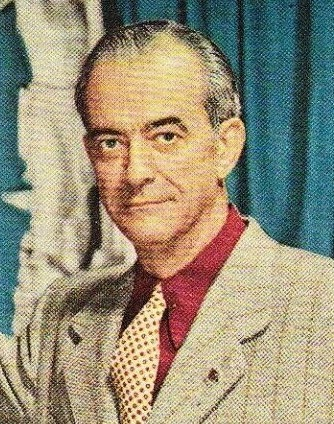
Williams in 1951

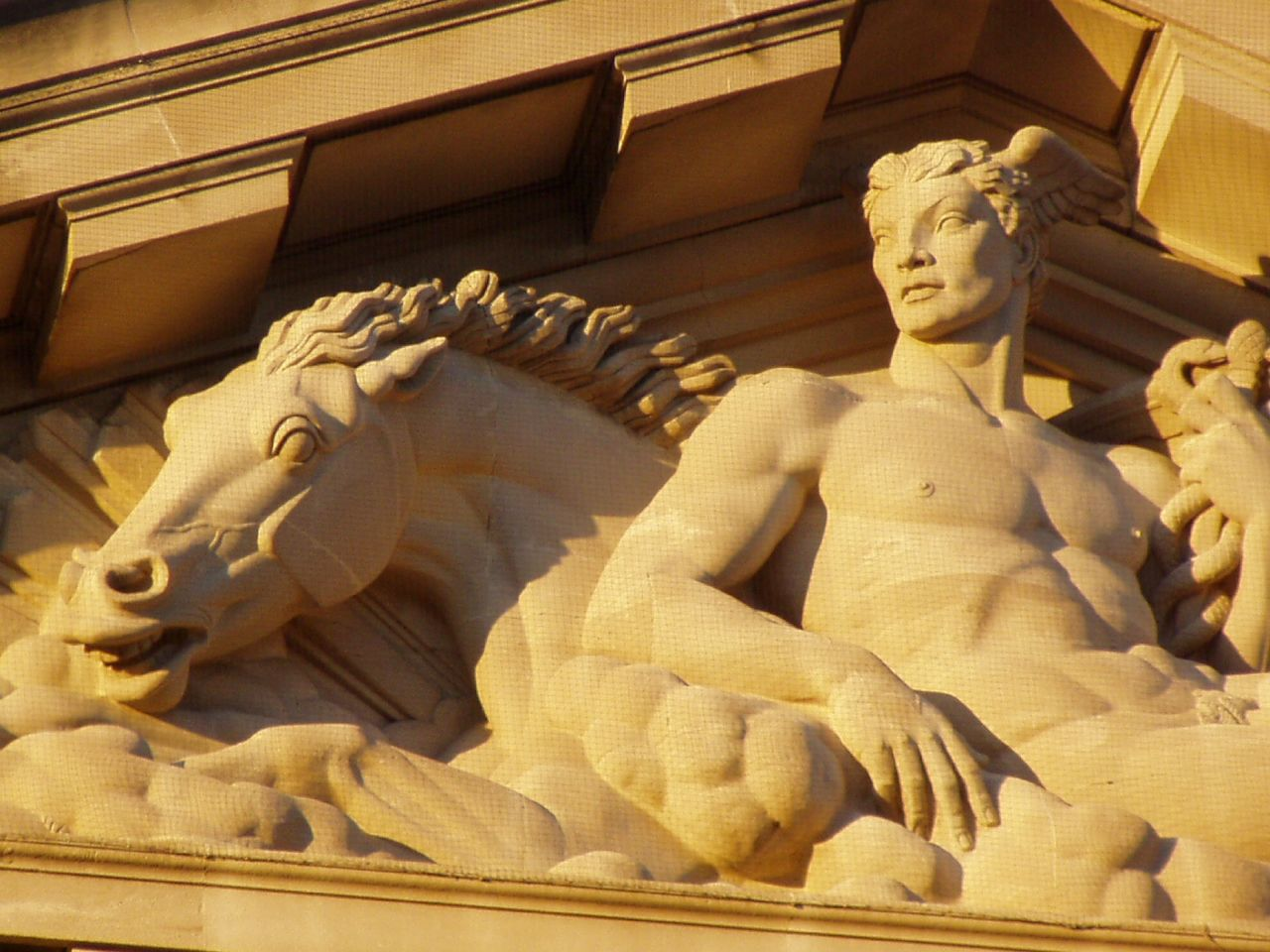
Commerce and Communications, 1935, Pediment of Environmental Protection Agency Building (former Interstate Commerce Commission), Federal Triangle, Washington, DC

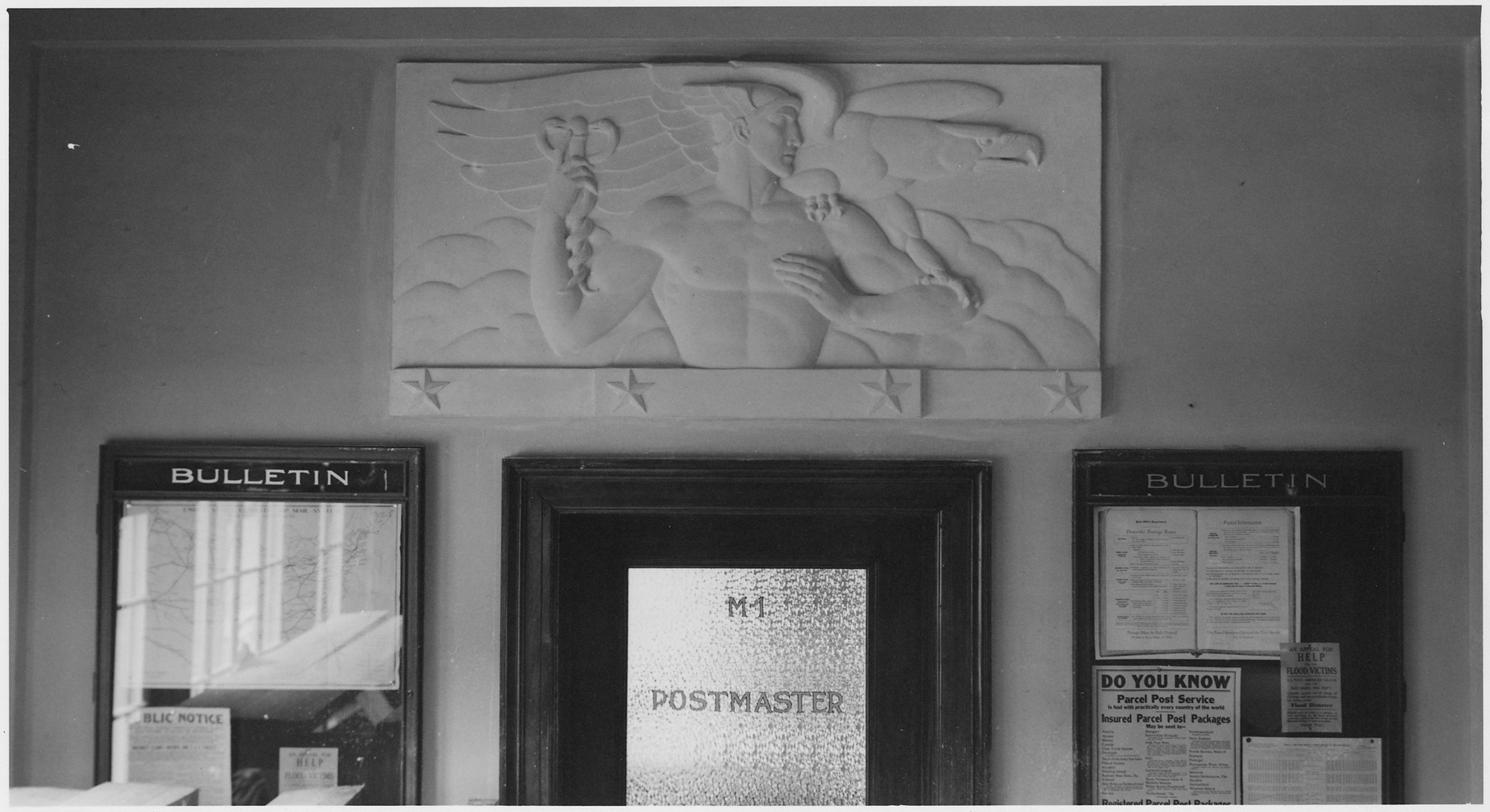
Speed, wall relief for the post office in Bay Shore, New York

Muse of the Missouri, 1960, detail of fountain sculpture in Kansas City, Missouri

Wheeler Williams (November 30, 1897 – August 12, 1972) was an American sculptor.

== Early life and education ==
Williams was born in Chicago and studied sculpture at the Art Institute of Chicago. He attended Yale University, where he graduated magna cum laude in 1919. He received a Master of Architecture degree from Harvard University in 1922. Williams studied at the École des Beaux-Arts in Paris.

== Career ==
Williams was one of a dozen sculptors invited to compete in the Pioneer Woman statue competition in 1927, which he failed to win. His model for that competition was later enlarged, cast and placed in front of the public library in Liberty, Kansas.

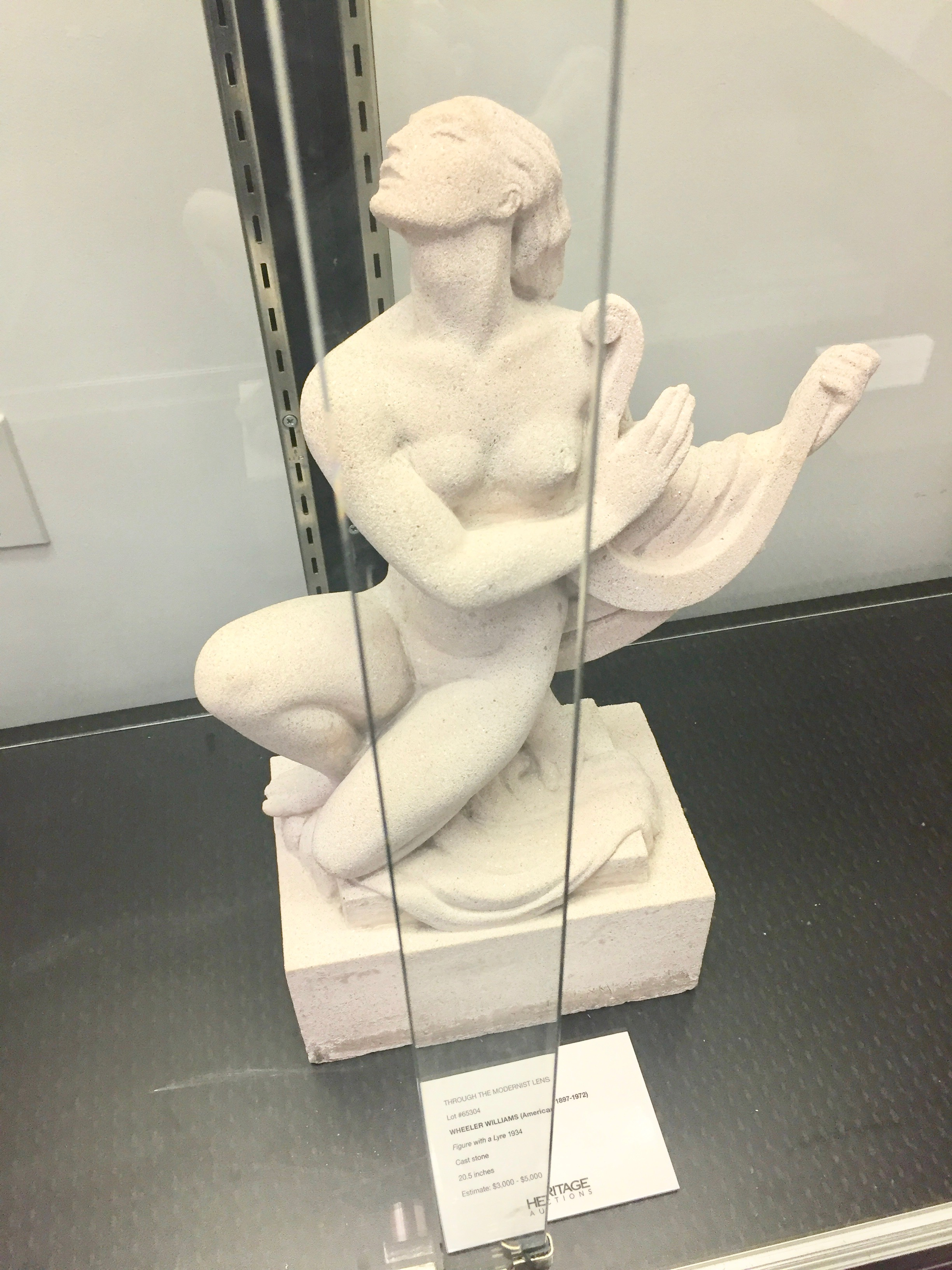
Figure with a Lyre, 1934, by Wheeler Williams.

Williams was a recipient of a Gould Medal at the Paris Exposition in 1937. He was a member of the National Academy, past president of the Fine Arts Federation of New York, and longtime president of the National Sculpture Society. Wheeler was also the founder and president of the American Artist Professional League.

=== Political involvement ===
Williams was a supporter of the House Un-American Activities Committee's search for communist "reds" in the arts. He also protested the Congressional censure of Joseph McCarthy.

Williams also served on the jury for the Alger Hiss treason trial.

Very active in the Republican Party, many of Williams' commissions reflect his conservative positions, including his work on the Robert A. Taft Memorial in Washington, D.C.

== Public monuments ==
- 1930 "Tablets to Pioneers", Michigan Avenue Bridge, Chicago
- 1935 "Communications" West Pediment of the Environmental Protection Agency Building (formerly Interstate Commerce Commission), Federal Triangle, Washington, D.C.
- 1938 "Indian Bowman," United States Post Office-Canal Street Station, New York City
- 1942 "Settlers of the Seaboard", Fairmount Park, Philadelphia
- 1949 "The Venus of Manhattan", Madison Avenue Facade, Parke Bernet Gallery, New York City
- 1951 four servicemen sculpture on the Wall of the Missing, Cambridge American Cemetery and Memorial, Cambridge, England
- 1952 "Fountain of the Water Babies", Children's Hospital, Seattle
- 1952 "Wave of Life", Houston Main Building (HMB) of The University of Texas M.D. Anderson Cancer Center; was the Prudential S.W. regional office until 1974, Houston
- 1955 "Robert A. Taft" plaque, Indian Hill Church Cemetery, Indian Hill, Ohio
- 1956 "Colonel Robert R. McCormick" bronze sculpture, Colonel's Place, Baie-Comeau, Quebec, Canada
- 1956 Commodore John Barry Memorial, Wexford, Ireland
- 1959 "Robert A. Taft Memorial," Capitol Grounds, Washington, D.C.
- 1960 "Muse of the Missouri" Fountain, Kansas City, Missouri
- 1961 "Spring, Summer, Fall," Memphis, Tennessee
