= South Peterboro Street Commercial Historic District =

Historic district in New York, United States

- U.S. National Register of Historic Places
- U.S. Historic district
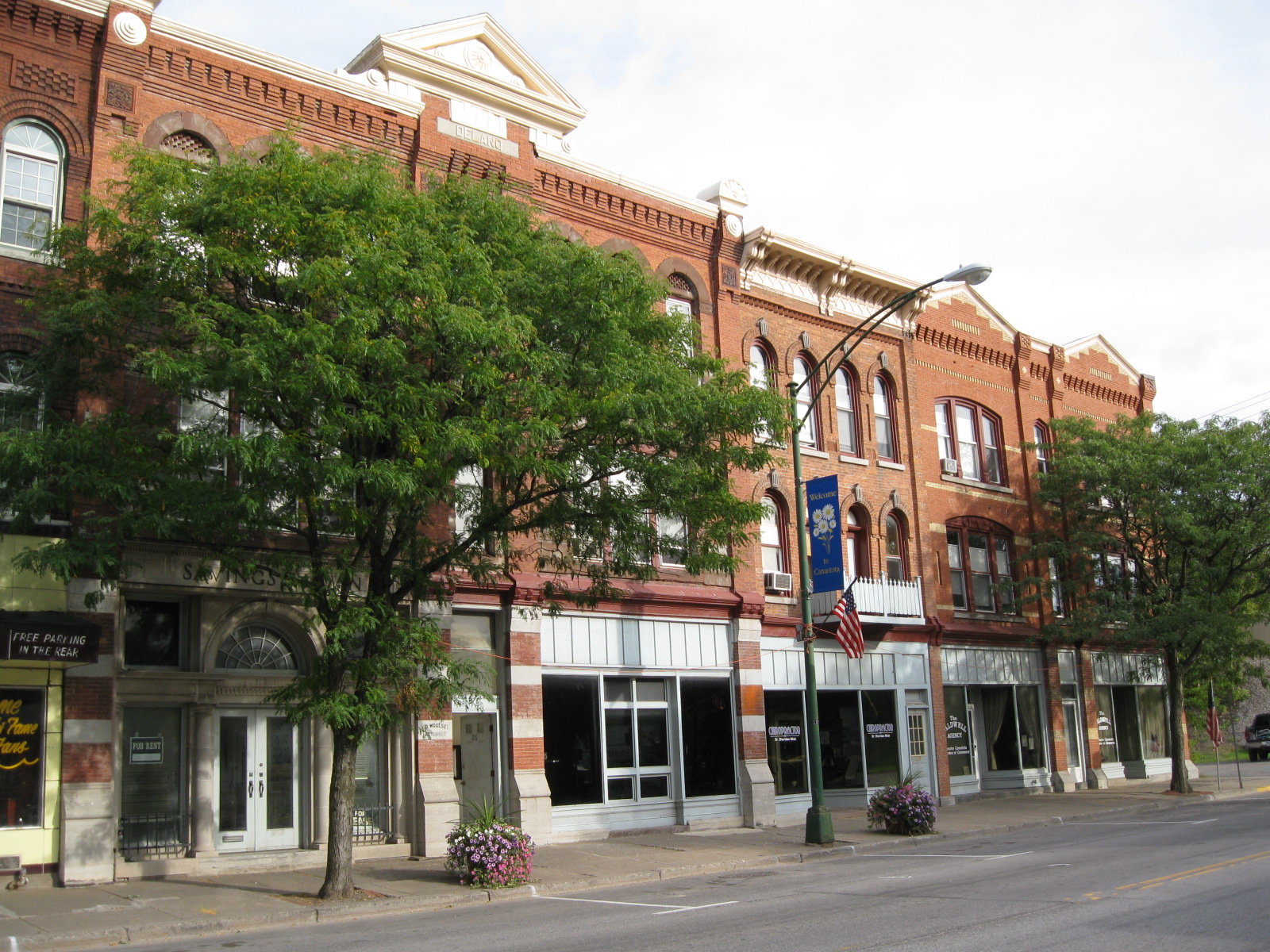
- South Peterboro Street Commercial Historic District, September 2009

- Location within New York Location within the United States
- Location: Roughly bounded by NY 76, Diamond St., Penn Central RR tracks, and Commerce Ave., Canastota, New York
- Coordinates: 43°4′41″N 75°45′6″W
- Area: 3 acres (1.2 ha)
- Built: 1870
- Architectural style: Classical Revival, Italianate, Victorian Eclectic
- MPS: Canastota Village MRA
- NRHP reference No.: 86001287
- Added to NRHP: May 23, 1986

South Peterboro Street Commercial Historic District is a national historic district located at Canastota in Madison County, New York. The district contains 20 contributing buildings, including the separately listed US Post Office-Canastota. The buildings were built between about 1870 and 1930 and are largely two and three story attached brick rows set close to the street.

It was added to the National Register of Historic Places in 1986.
