= United States Post Office (Canal Street Station) =

Historic post office in Manhattan, New York

- United States Post Office; Canal Street Station
- U.S. National Register of Historic Places
- New York State Register of Historic Places
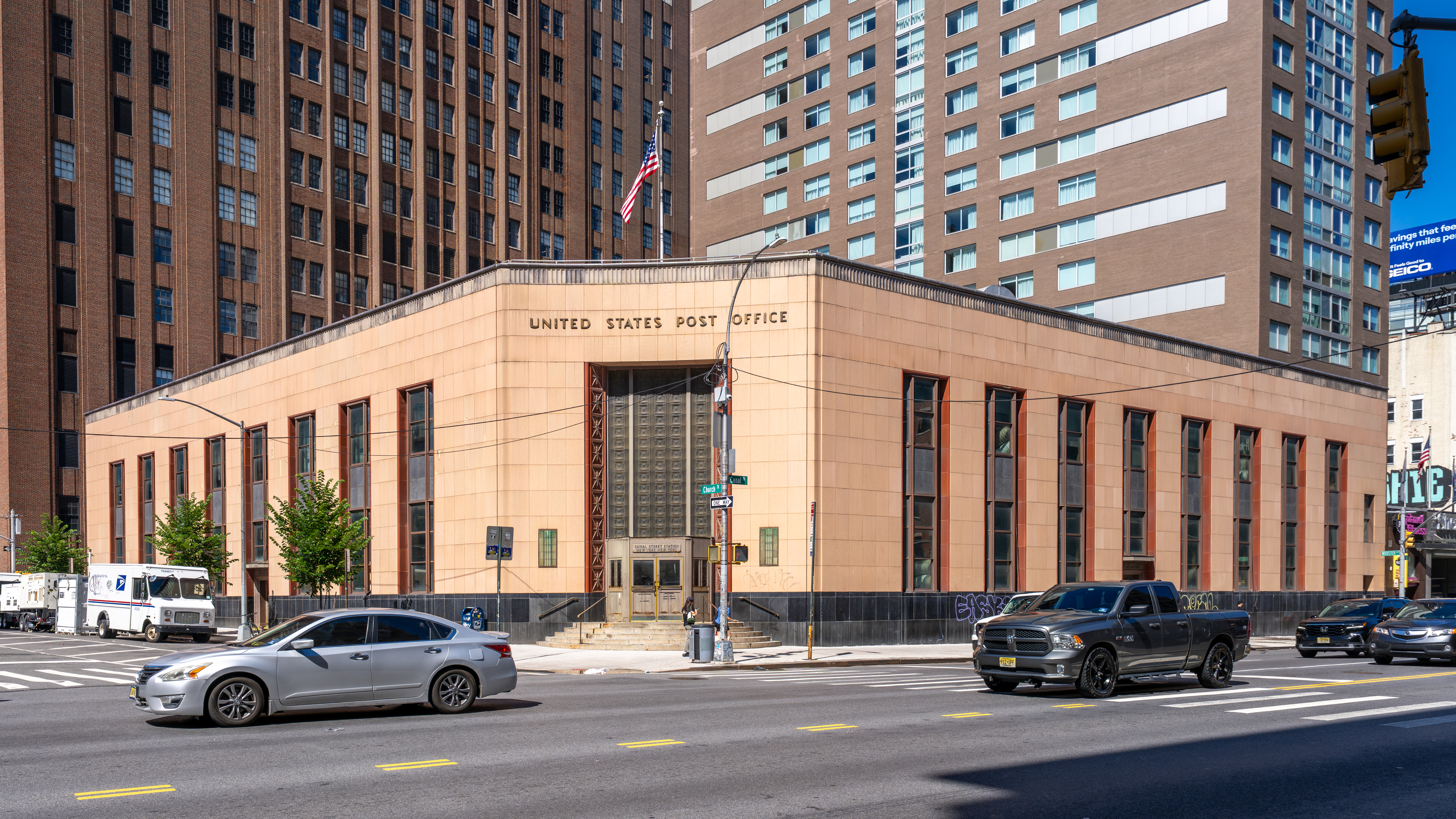
- Canal Street Station (2026)

- Location within Lower Manhattan Location within Manhattan Location within New York City Location within New York Location within the United States
- Location: 350 Canal Street, Tribeca, Manhattan, New York City
- Coordinates: 40°43′14″N 74°0′14″W
- Area: 1.9 acres (0.77 ha)
- Built: 1937
- Architect: Alan Balch Mills; Wheeler Williams (interior relief)
- Architectural style: Art Moderne
- MPS: US Post Offices in New York State, 1858-1943, TR
- NRHP reference No.: 88002358
- NYSRHP No.: 06101.001778

Significant dates
- Added to NRHP: May 11, 1989
- Designated NYSRHP: May 11, 1989

The United States Post Office Canal Street Station, originally known as "Station B", is a historic post office building located at 350 Canal Street at the corner of Church Street in the Tribeca neighborhood of Manhattan, New York City. It was built in 1937, and designed by consulting architect Alan Balch Mills for the Office of the Supervising Architect of the United States Department of the Treasury.

The building is a two-story and symmetrically massed, clad with buff terra cotta panels with a black terra cotta base in the Moderne style. It features a fluted terra cotta frieze with a tarnished silver finish. According to the AIA Guide to New York City, "[t]he articularted inset bay windows on Church Streets are a wonderful mannerism ... [that] give[s] the allusion of scanning the streets north and south, and add plasticity to the building." The interior features a relief executed in 1938 by artist Wheeler Williams and titled "Indian Bowman."

The building was listed on the National Register of Historic Places in 1989.

== See also ==
- National Register of Historic Places listings in New York County, New York
