= United States Post Office (Northport, New York) =

- US Post Office-Northport
- U.S. National Register of Historic Places
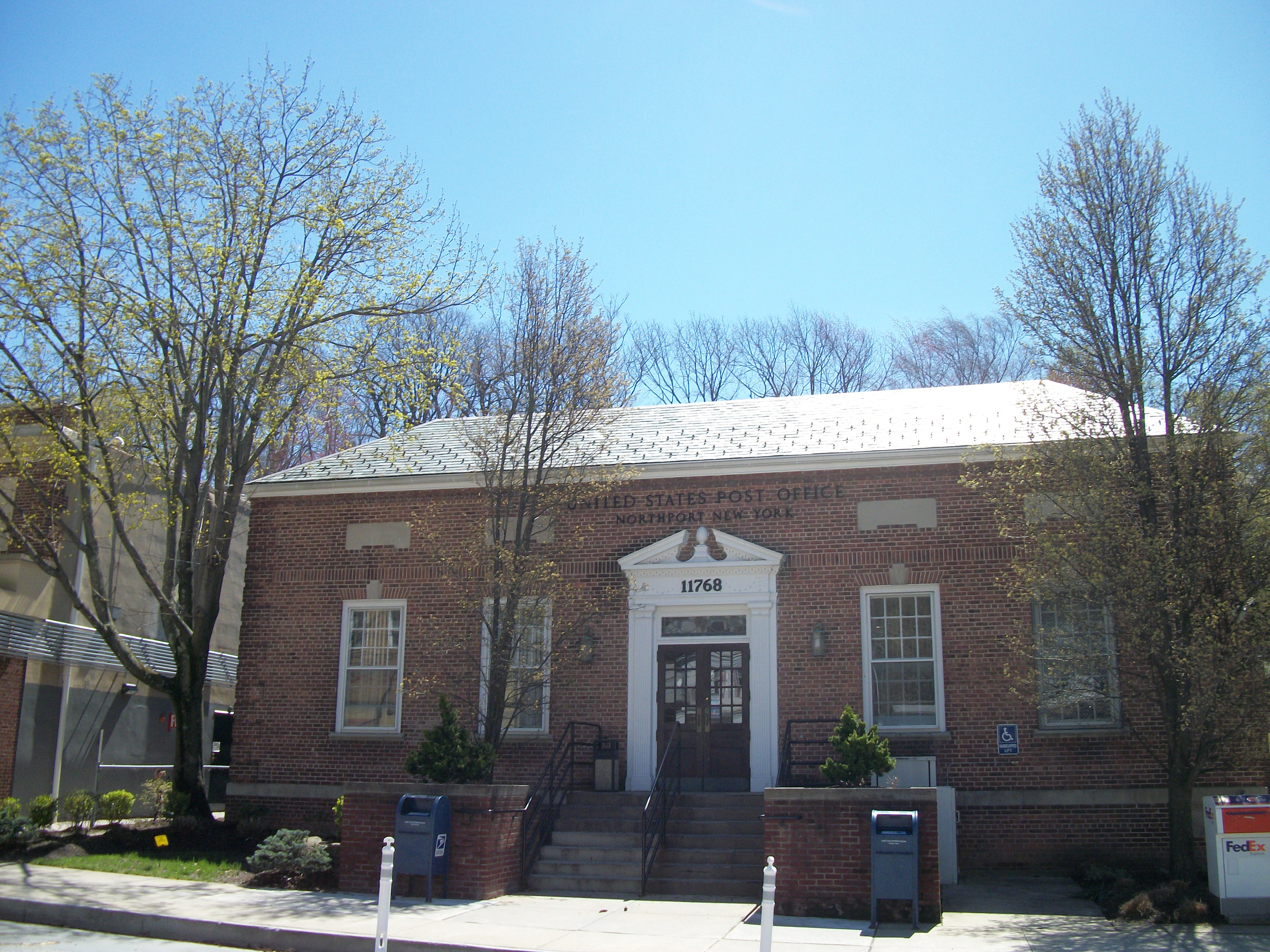
- The Northport Post Office on a Sunday afternoon in 2011.

- Location within Long Island Location within New York Location within the United States
- Interactive map showing the location of the U.S. Post Office-Northport
- Location: 244 Main Street, Northport, NY
- Coordinates: 40°54′2″N 73°20′52″W
- Area: less than one acre
- Built: 1936
- Architect: Simon, Louis A.; US Treasury Department
- Architectural style: Colonial Revival
- MPS: US Post Offices in New York State, 1858-1943, TR
- NRHP reference No.: 88002356
- Added to NRHP: May 11, 1989

Northport Post Office, the U.S. post office in Northport, New York, is located at 244 Main Street in Northport, New York. It serves the ZIP code 11768, which also includes Asharoken, Eaton's Neck, Vernon Valley, Middleville, and Fort Salonga.

Northport Post Office was designed by Louis A. Simon in conjunction with the United States Treasury Department. Simon also designed the Post Office buildings in Bay Shore, Riverhead, and Westhampton Beach. The building was added to the National Register of Historic Places in 1989, along with two other Simon-built post offices.
