= United States Post Office (Johnson City, New York) =

- US Post Office-Johnson City
- U.S. National Register of Historic Places
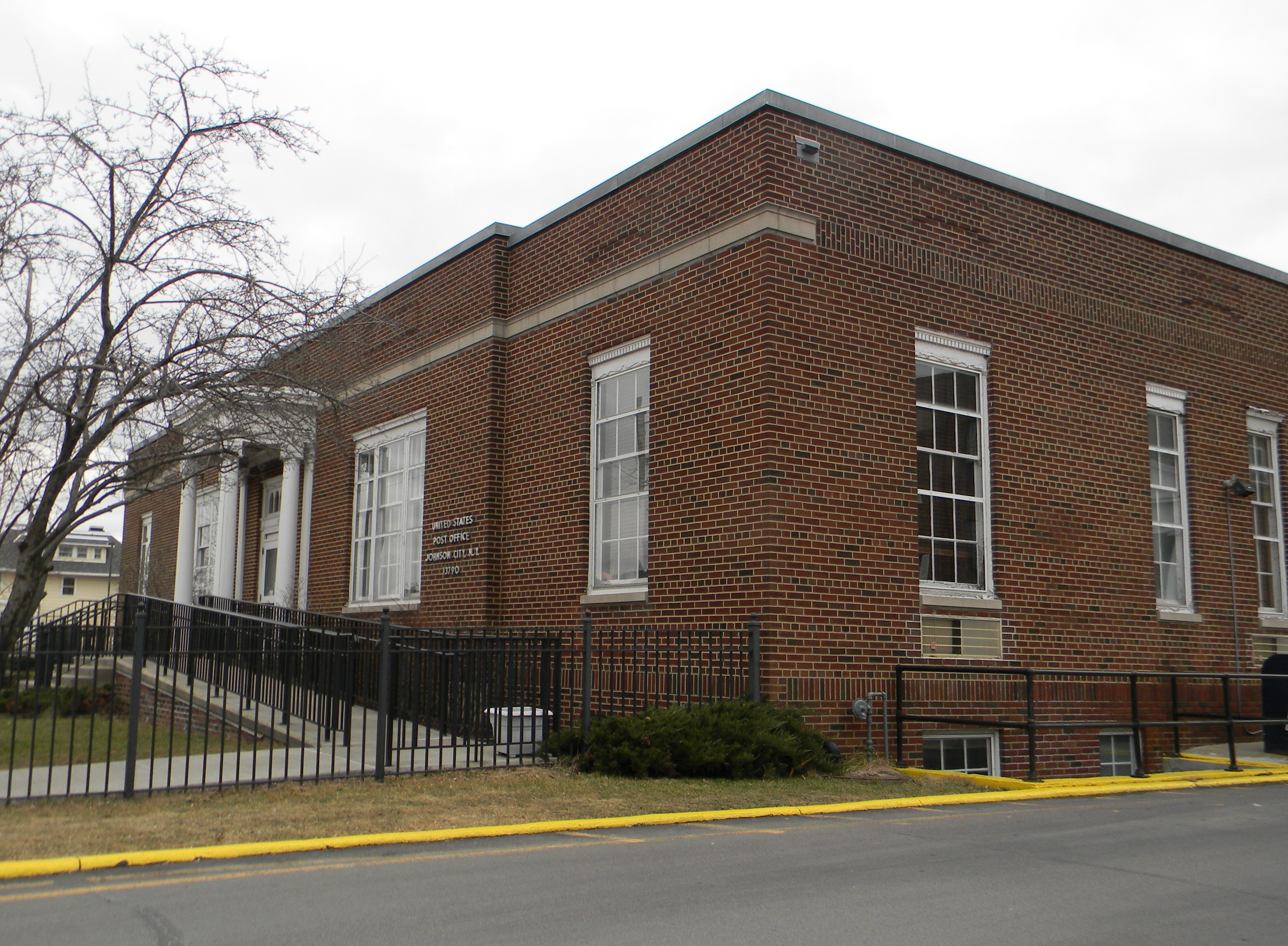
- Johnson City Poset Office, February 2012

- Location within New York Location within the United States
- Location: 307 Main St., Johnson City, New York
- Coordinates: 42°6′57″N 75°57′31″W
- Area: less than one acre
- Built: 1934
- Architect: Simon, Louis A.; Knight, Frederic Charles
- Architectural style: Colonial Revival
- MPS: US Post Offices in New York State, 1858-1943, TR
- NRHP reference No.: 88002336
- Added to NRHP: May 11, 1989

US Post Office-Johnson City is a historic post office building located at 307 Main Street in Johnson City in Broome County, New York. It was designed and built in 1934 and is one of a number of post offices in New York State designed by the Office of the Supervising Architect of the Treasury Department, Louis A. Simon. The interior features a mural by Frederic Charles Knight.

It was listed on the National Register of Historic Places in 1989.
