= United States Post Office (Dunkirk, New York) =

- US Post Office--Dunkirk
- U.S. National Register of Historic Places
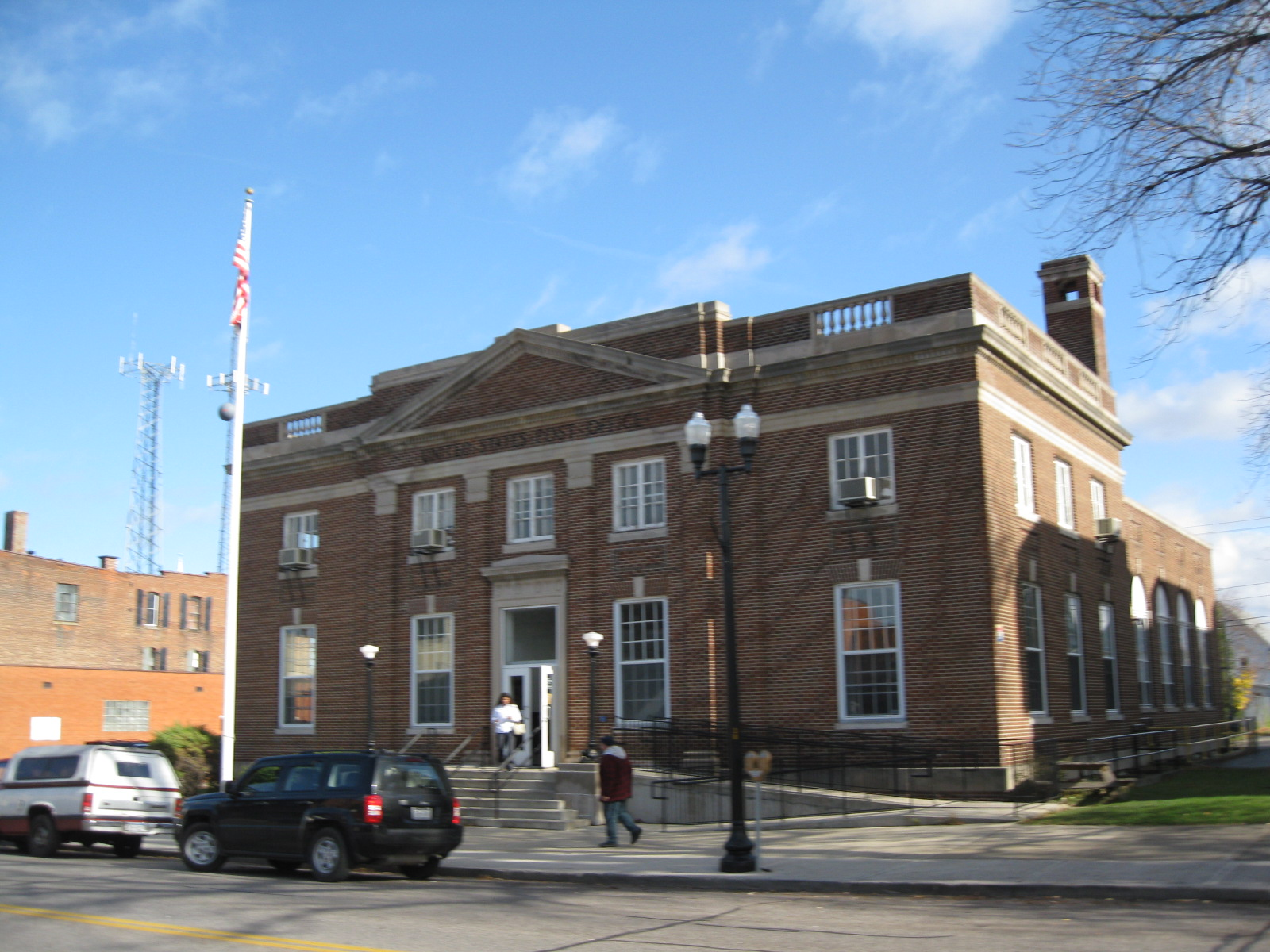
- U.S. Post Office, Dunkirk, New York, November 2009

- Location within New York Location within the United States
- Interactive map showing the location for U.S. Post Office-Dunkirk
- Location: 410 Central Ave., Dunkirk, New York
- Coordinates: 42°28′54″N 79°20′1″W
- Built: 1928
- Architect: Wetmore, James A.
- Architectural style: Colonial Revival
- MPS: US Post Offices in New York State, 1858-1943, TR
- NRHP reference No.: 88002488
- Added to NRHP: November 17, 1988

US Post Office-Dunkirk is a historic post office building located at Dunkirk in Chautauqua County, New York. It was designed and built in 1928-1929 and is one of a number of post offices in New York State designed by the Office of the Supervising Architect of the Treasury Department, James A. Wetmore. It is a two-story brick structure with a one-story rear wing, in the Colonial Revival style. The entrance is set within a limestone surround with a Doric frieze and modest cornice.

It was listed on the National Register of Historic Places in 1988.
