= O'Brien General Store and Post Office =

Historic commercial building in New York, United States

- U.S. National Register of Historic Places
- U.S. Historic district – Contributing property
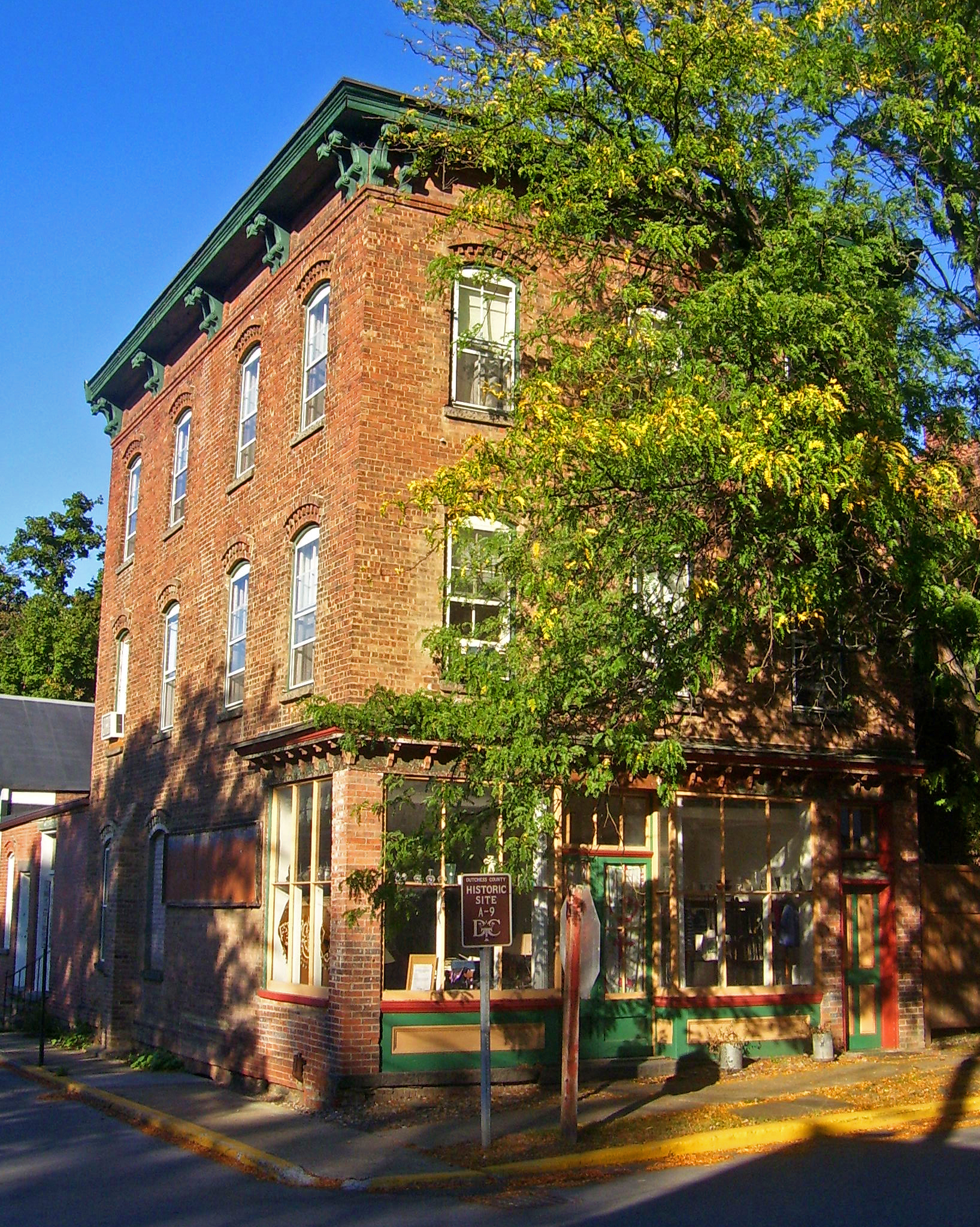
- General store half of the complex in 2007

- Location within New York Location within the United States
- Location: Rhinecliff, NY
- Nearest city: Kingston
- Coordinates: 41°55′11″N 73°57′04″W
- Area: less than one acre
- Built: late 19th century
- Architectural style: Italianate
- Part of: Hudson River Historic District (ID90002219)
- MPS: Rhinebeck Town MRA
- NRHP reference No.: 87001088
- Added to NRHP: July 9, 1987

The O'Brien General Store and Post Office is a combined store and post office located at Schatzell and Charles streets in the hamlet of Rhinecliff, New York, United States, across from the community's central plaza. It is a two-building Italianate complex built in the late 19th century. The western half houses the store and the eastern the post office, which serves the small 12574 ZIP Code roughly contiguous with the riverside hamlet.

It is a contributing property to the Hudson River Historic District, a National Historic Landmark which includes all of the hamlet. The building itself was added to the National Register of Historic Places in 1987.
