= United States Post Office (Watkins Glen, New York) =

- US Post Office-Watkins Glen
- U.S. National Register of Historic Places
- New York State Register of Historic Places
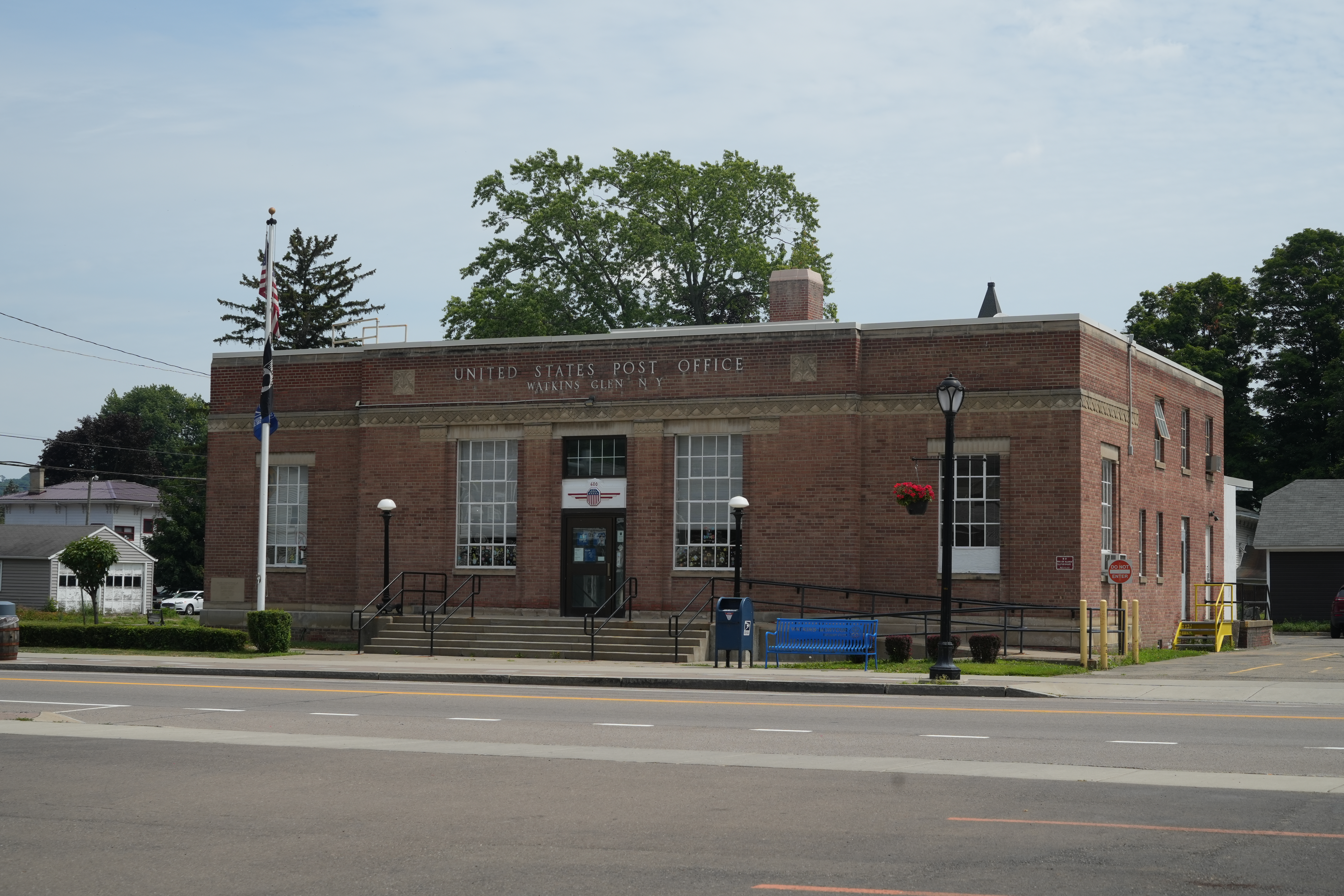
- Watkins Glen, NY Post Office

- Location within New York Location within the United States
- Location: 600 N. Franklin St., Watkins Glen, New York 14891
- Coordinates: 42°22′45″N 76°52′21″W
- Area: less than one acre
- Built: 1934
- Architect: Simon, Louis A.; US Treasury Department
- Architectural style: Colonial Revival, Art Deco
- MPS: US Post Offices in New York State, 1858-1943, TR
- NRHP reference No.: 88002443
- NYSRHP No.: 09740.000191

Significant dates
- Added to NRHP: May 11, 1989
- Designated NYSRHP: May 11, 1989

US Post Office-Watkins Glen is a historic post office building located at Watkins Glen in Schuyler County, New York. It was designed and built in 1934-1935 and is one of a number of post offices in New York State designed by the Office of the Supervising Architect of the Treasury Department, Louis A. Simon. It is a small, two story, red brick clad building executed in the Colonial Revival style.

It was listed on the National Register of Historic Places in 1989.
