= Old Platte Clove Post Office =

- U.S. National Register of Historic Places
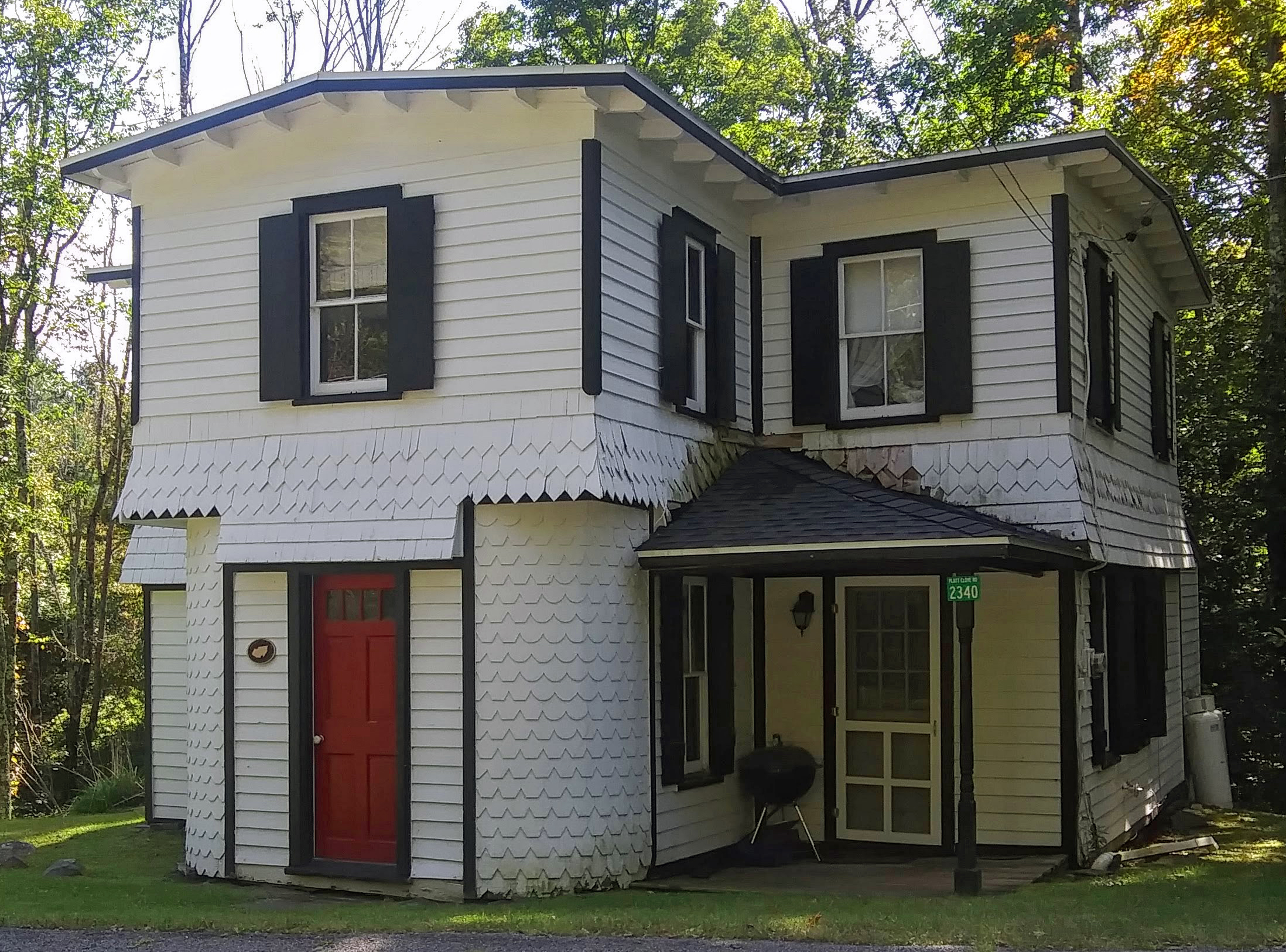
- Front elevation, 2021

- Location within New York Location within the United States
- Nearest city: Elka Park, New York
- Coordinates: 42.1343°N 74.0883°W
- Area: less than one acre
- Built: 1885
- NRHP reference No.: 05000637
- Added to NRHP: June 30, 2005

Old Platte Clove Post Office is a historic post office building located at Elka Park in Greene County, New York. It was built about 1885 and is a light wood balloon frame Victorian-era T-shaped structure that served a residence and post office. It was used as a residence and post office from 1888 to 1911.

It was listed on the National Register of Historic Places in 2005.
