= United States Post Office (Bay Shore, New York) =

- US Post Office-Bay Shore
- U.S. National Register of Historic Places
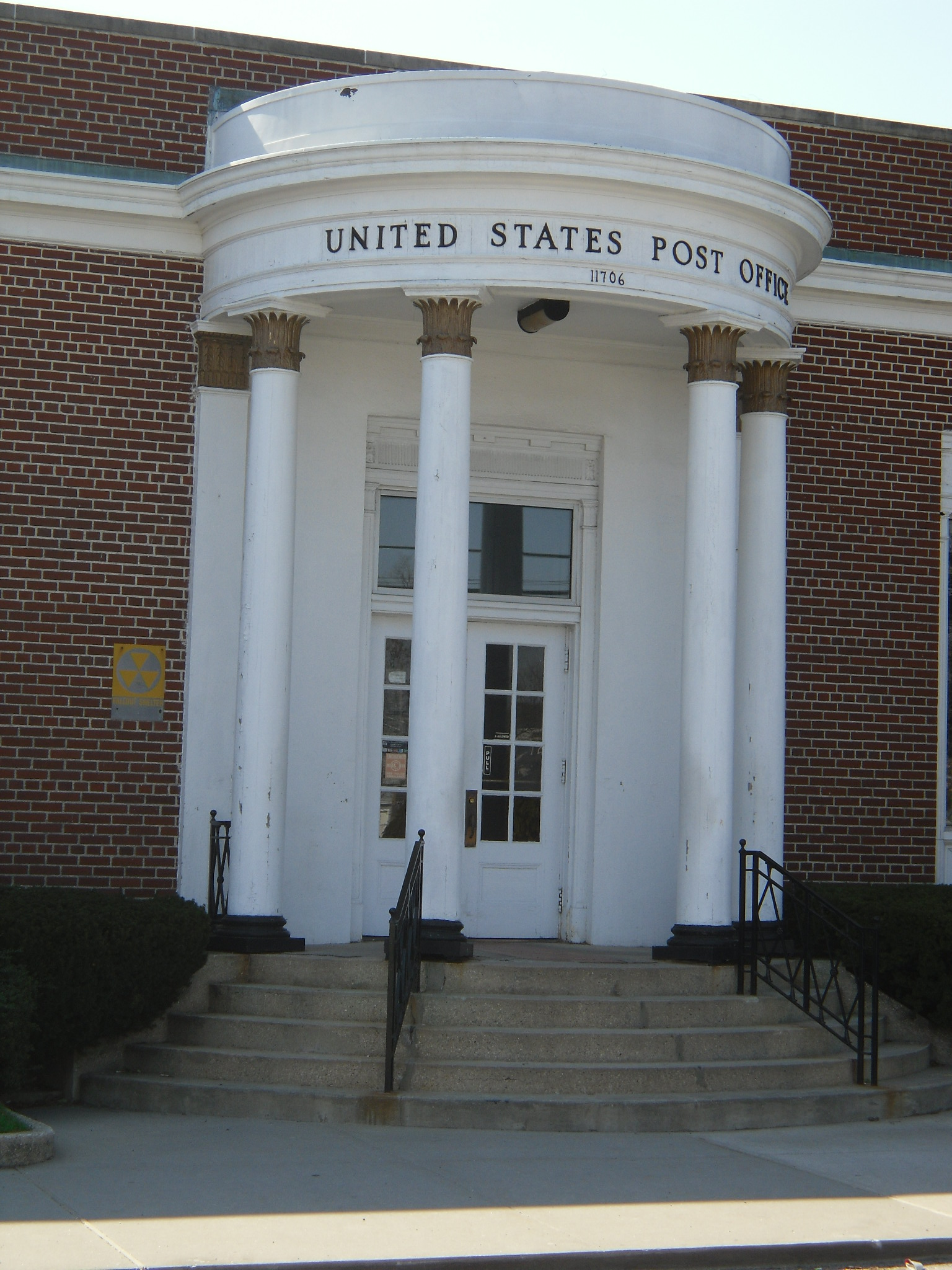
- U.S. Post Office, March 2010

- Location within New York Location within the United States
- Location: 10 Bay Shore Avenue, Bay Shore, NY
- Coordinates: 40°43′23″N 73°14′41″W
- Architect: Louis A. Simon & Wheeler Williams
- Architectural style: Colonial Revival
- MPS: US Post Offices in New York State, 1858-1943, TR
- NRHP reference No.: 88002455
- Added to NRHP: November 17, 1988

Bay Shore Post Office, the U.S. post office in Bay Shore, New York, is located at 10 Bay Shore Avenue just north of Main Street. It serves the ZIP code 11706, as well as Kismet, Saltaire, Dunewood, Fair Harbor, and Point O'Woods, on Fire Island.

Bay Shore Post Office was designed by Louis A. Simon and artist Wheeler Williams. Unlike Simon's work on the Post Office buildings in Northport, Riverhead, and Westhampton Beach, Bay Shore Post Office was not designed in conjunction with the United States Treasury Department.

The building was added to the National Register of Historic Places in 1988, unlike other Simon-built Post Offices in Suffolk County that were added in 1989.

Names acceptable to Post Office for Zip Code 11706

- Bay Shore, NY
- Fair Harbor, NY
- Kismet, NY
- Point O Woods, NY
- Saltaire, NY

Names not acceptable to Post Office for Zip Code 11706

- Bayshore, NY
- N Bay Shore, NY
- North Bay Shore, NY
- W Bay Shore, NY
- West Bay Shore, NY
