= United States Post Office (Westhampton Beach, New York) =

- US Post Office — Westhampton Beach
- U.S. National Register of Historic Places
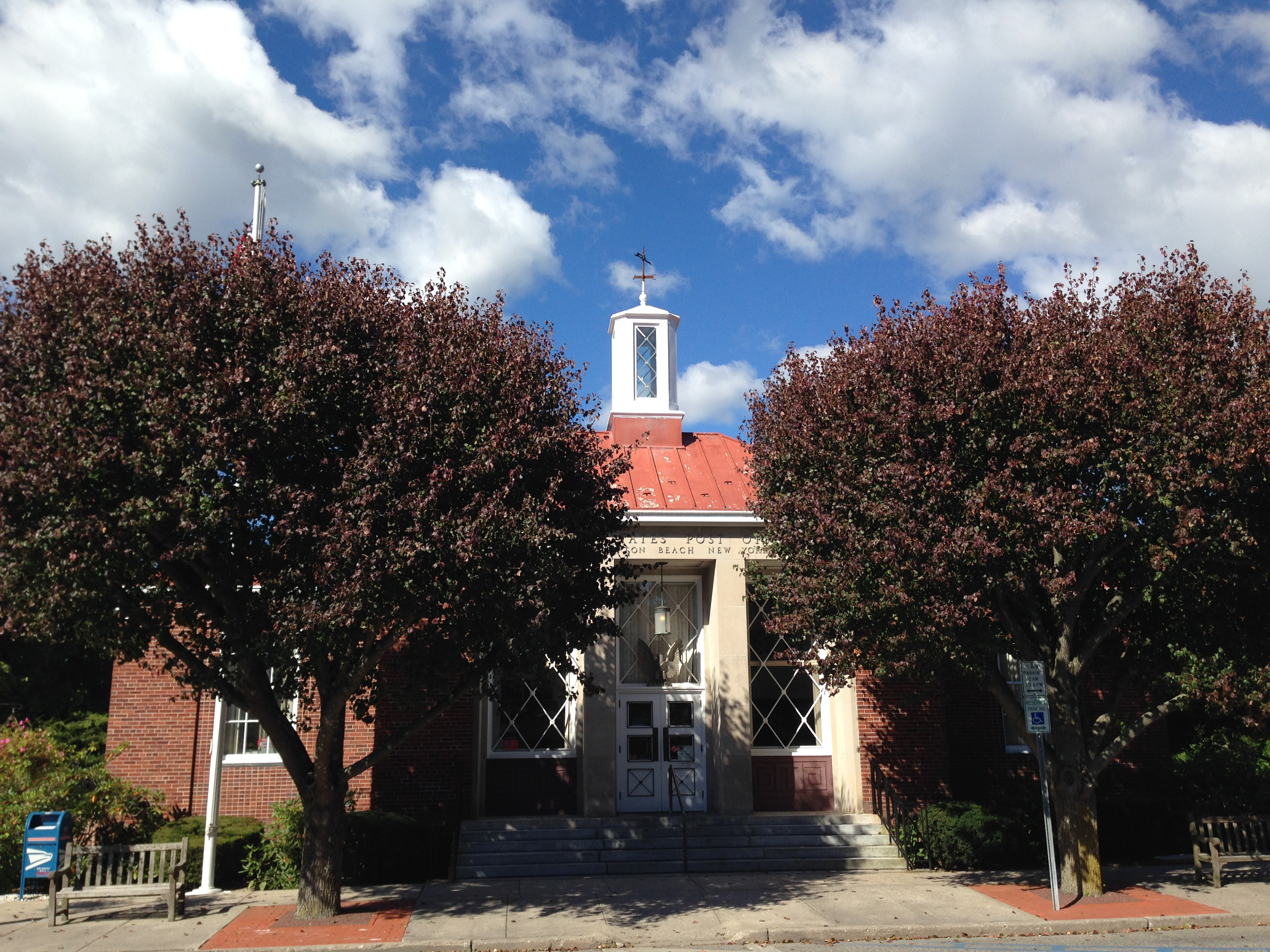

- Location within New York Location within the United States
- Location: 170 Main Street, Westhampton Beach, NY
- Coordinates: 40°48′37″N 72°38′26″W
- Architect: Louis A. Simon & US Treasury Department
- Architectural style: Colonial Revival
- MPS: US Post Offices in New York State, 1858-1943, TR
- NRHP reference No.: 88002446
- Added to NRHP: May 11, 1989

Westhampton Beach Post Office, the U.S. post office in Westhampton Beach, New York, is located at 170 Main Street between Mill Road and Beach Road. It serves the ZIP code 11978, and is southeast of the Westhampton Post Office on Mill Road.

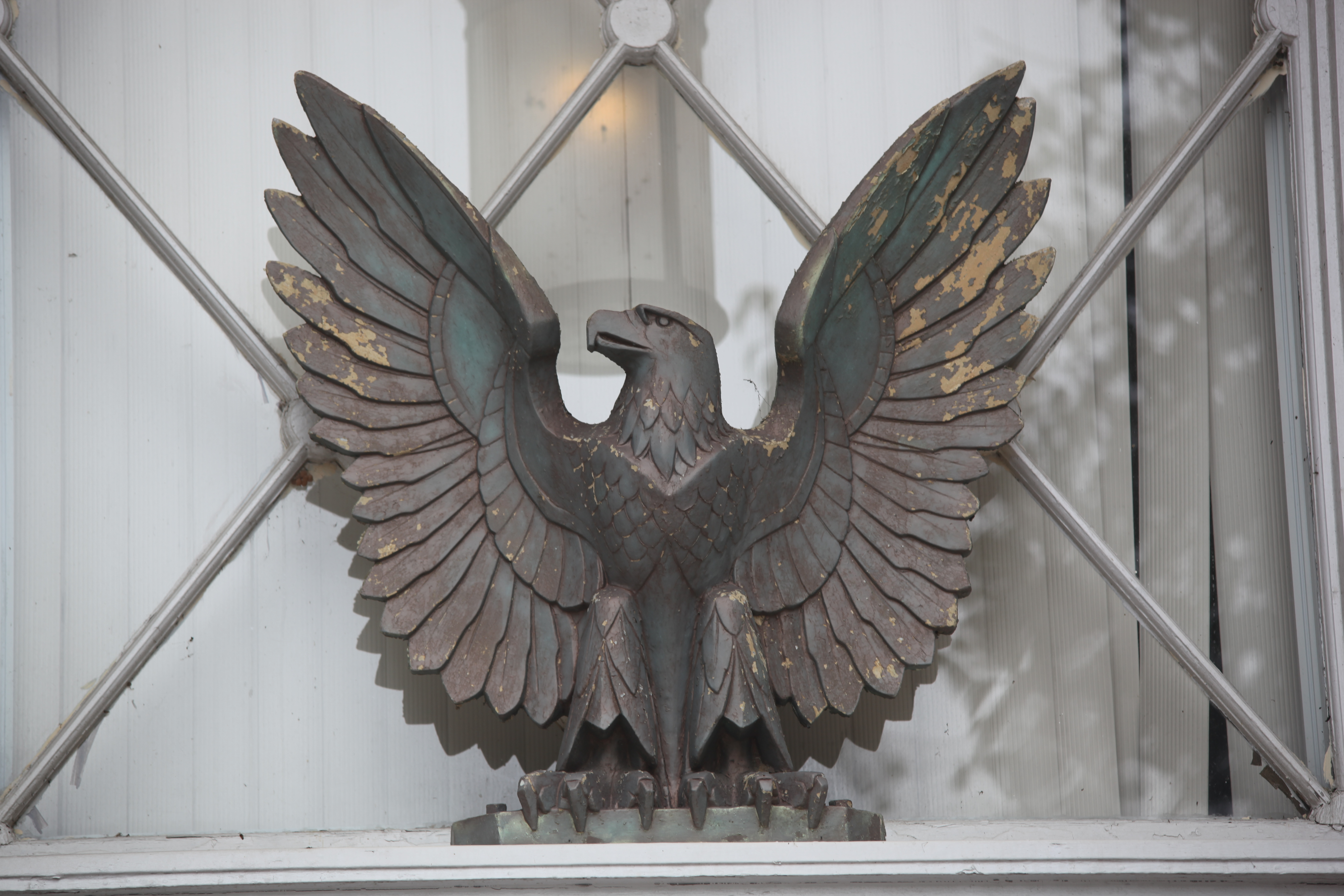
designed by Louis A. Simon - brass eagle above the entrance

Westhampton Beach Post Office was designed by Louis A. Simon in conjunction with the United States Treasury Department. Simon also designed the Post Office buildings in Bay Shore, Northport, and Riverhead. His public buildings were in the Colonial Revival style.

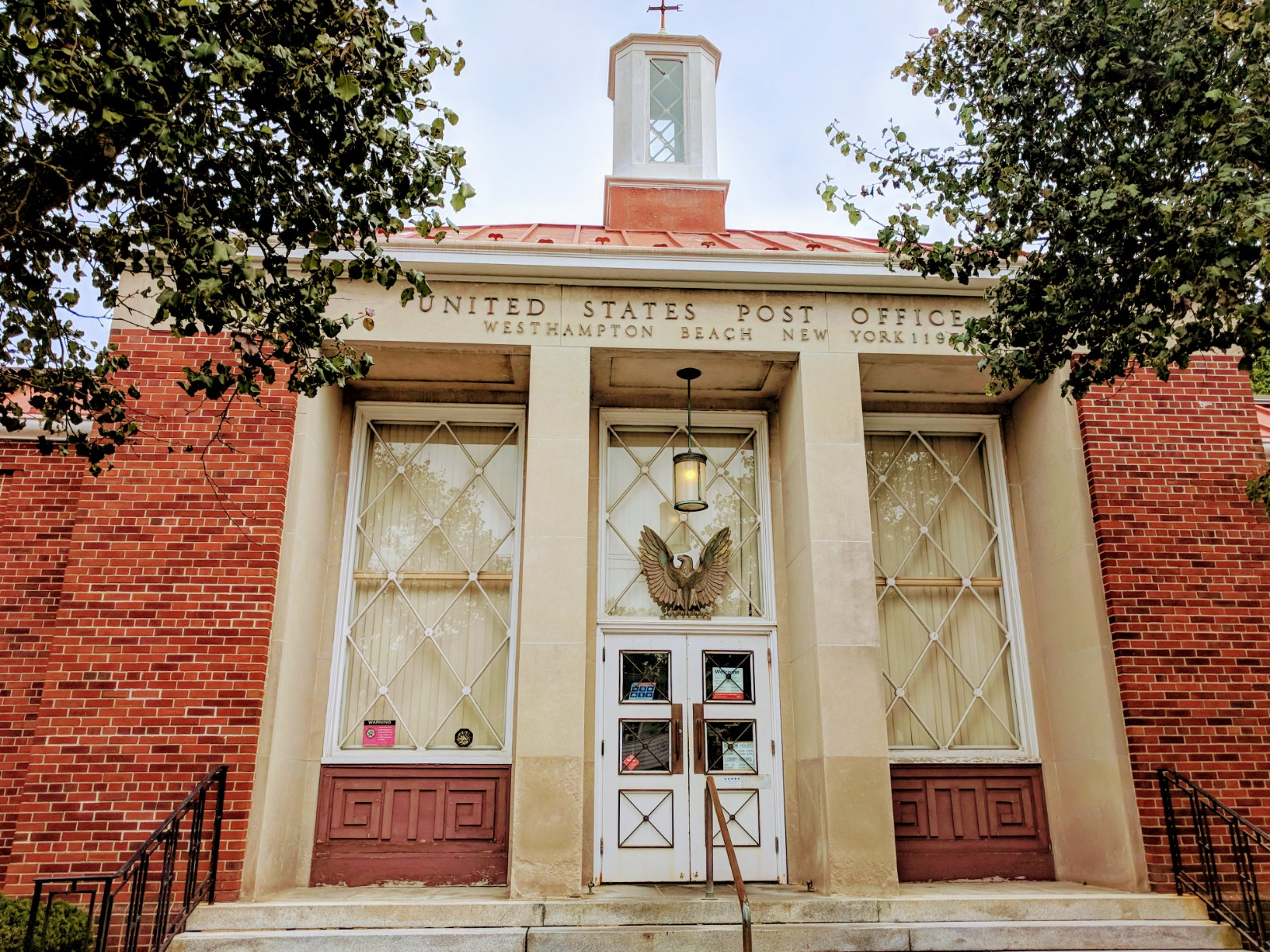
USPO Westhampton Beach 20180914

== The Section ==
A large mural on one wall was typical of work commissioned by the Section of Fine Arts, which Simon was in charge of as supervising architect under the control of the United States Department of the Treasury. As a New Deal office from its origination in 1933 it employed out of work artists to produce art for public buildings. It was referred to simply as “the Section.” Many of the New Deal organizations roles was to create jobs for the many unemployed of the depression, in this case, artists. It was given the task of placing works of art in public places, such as post offices and libraries, for the appreciation of art. Simon was removed from the position in 1939 and the production of public art was removed from the treasury department in 1943. The building was added to the National Register of Historic Places in 1989,

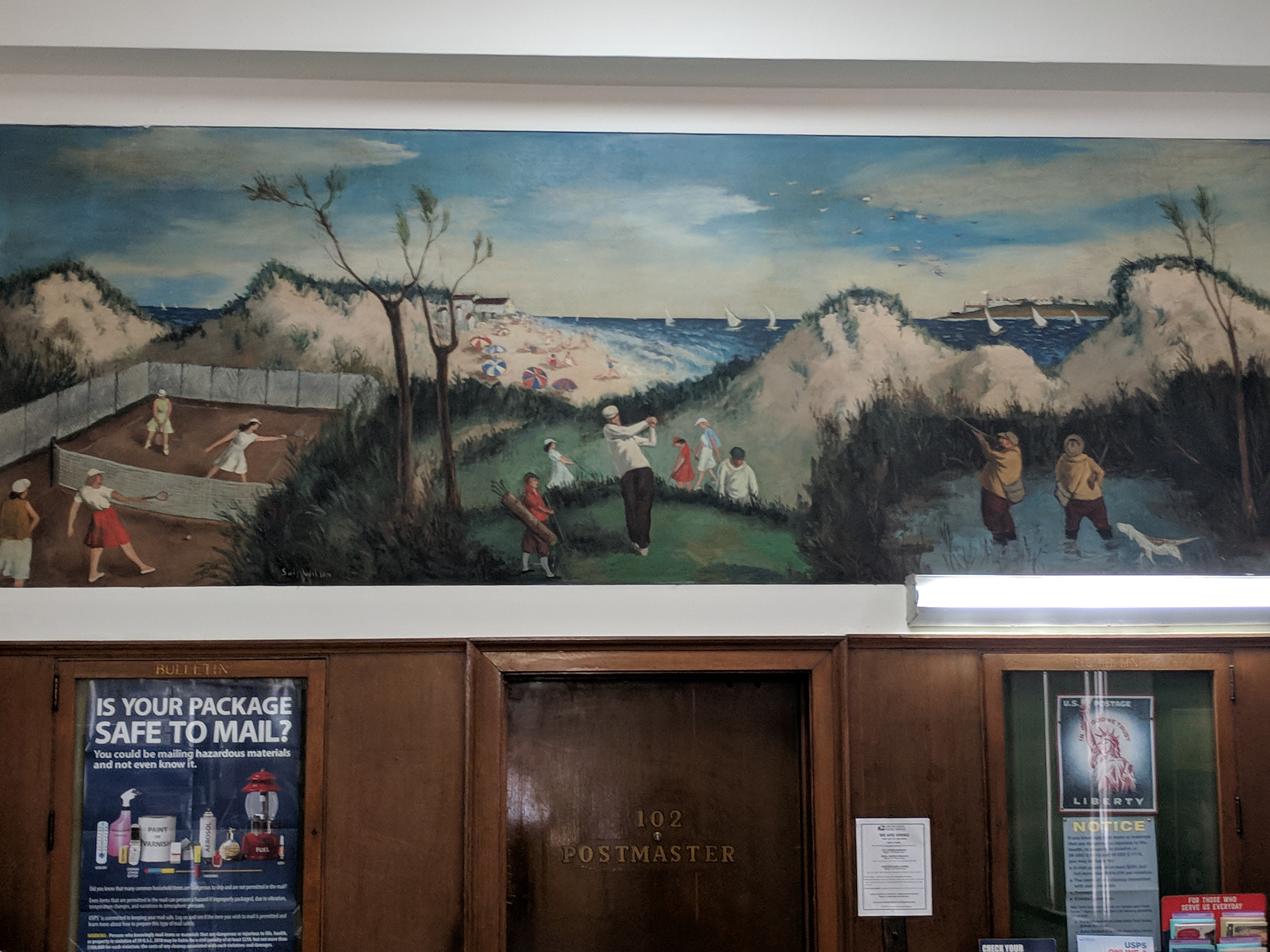
Beach mural USPO 20180914
