= United States Post Office (Canastota, New York) =

- US Post Office-Canastota
- U.S. National Register of Historic Places
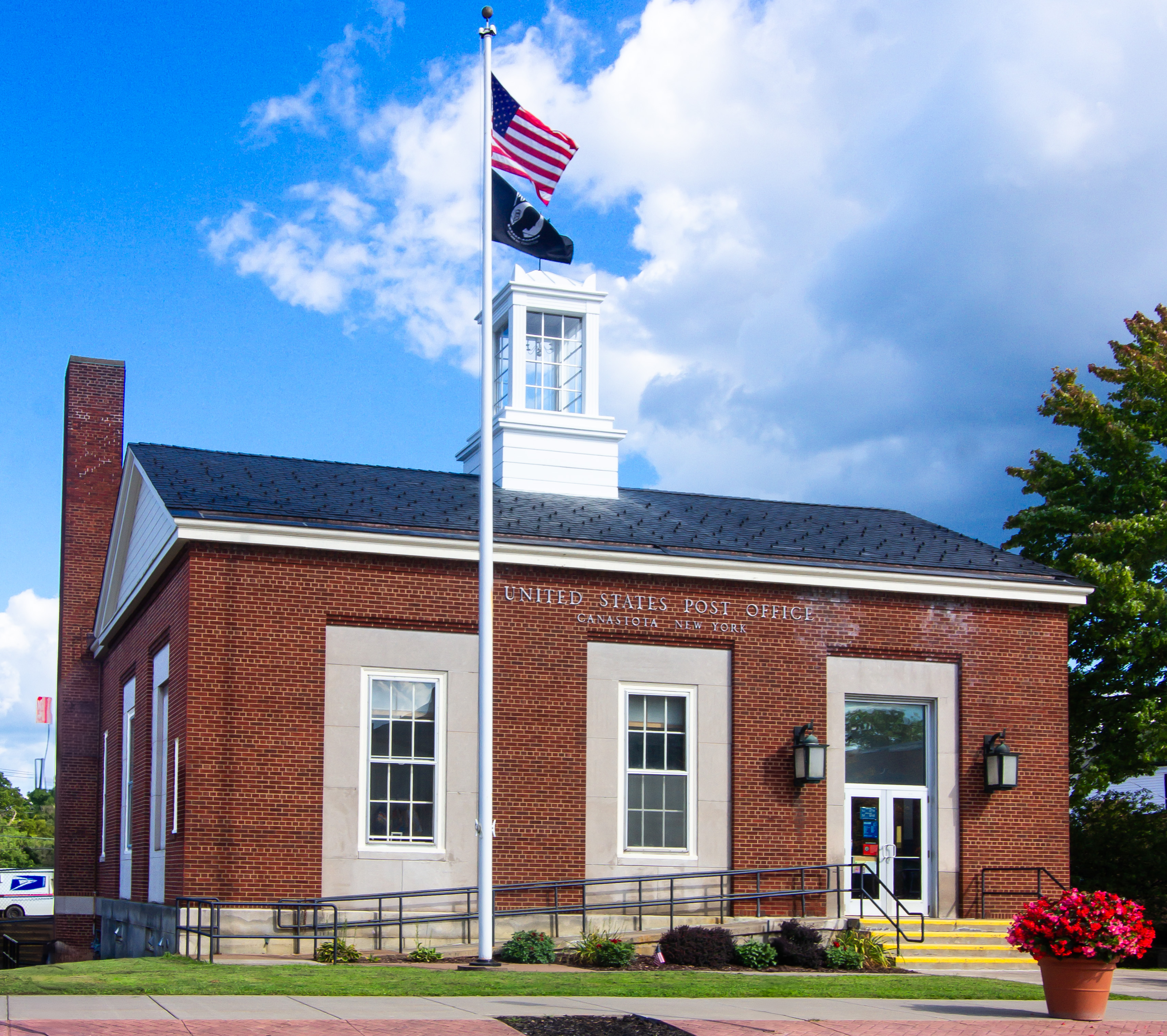

- Location within New York Location within the United States
- Location: 118 S. Peterboro St., Canastota, New York
- Coordinates: 43°4′43″N 75°45′5″W
- Area: less than one acre
- Built: 1940
- Architect: Simon, Louis A.; Kingsbury, Alison Mason
- Architectural style: Colonial Revival
- MPS: US Post Offices in New York State, 1858-1943, TR
- NRHP reference No.: 88002467
- Added to NRHP: November 17, 1988

US Post Office-Canastota is a historic post office building located at Canastota in Madison County, New York, United States. It is within the boundaries of the South Peterboro Street Commercial Historic District. It was designed and built in 1940, and is one of a number of post offices in New York State designed by the Office of the Supervising Architect of the Treasury Department, Louis A. Simon. It is a one-story, three bay steel frame building with facades of red brick laid in common bond in the Colonial Revival style. It features a gable roof crowned by a square, wooden cupola. The interior features a 1942 mural by Alison Mason Kingsbury titled The Onion Fields.

It was listed on the National Register of Historic Places in 1988.
