= United States Post Office (Nyack, New York) =

- U.S. Post Office
- U.S. National Register of Historic Places
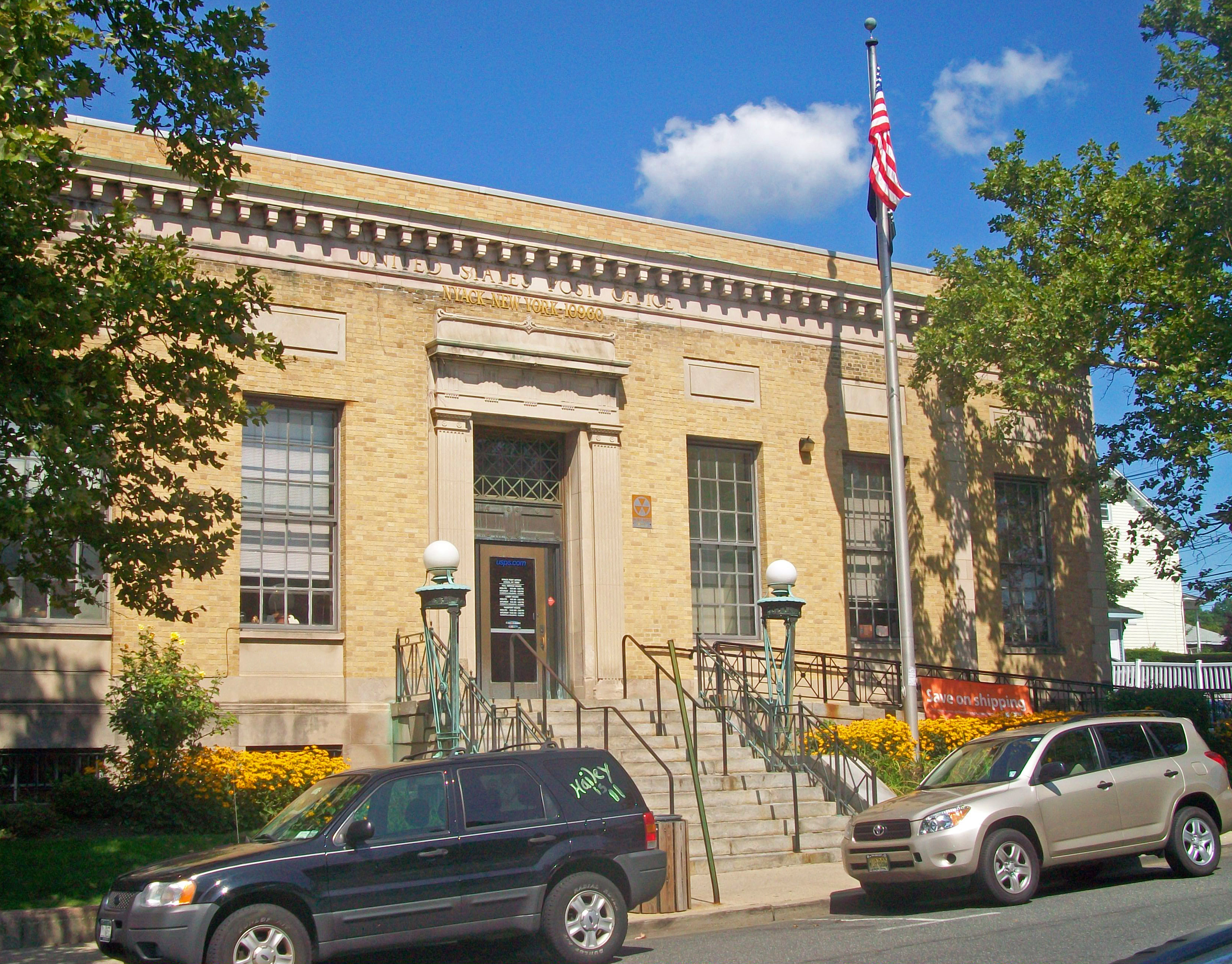
- East elevation, 2009

- Location within New York Location within the United States
- Interactive map showing the location for U.S. Post Office-Nyack
- Location: Nyack, NY
- Nearest city: White Plains
- Coordinates: 41°5′19″N 73°55′9″W
- Area: less than one acre
- Built: 1932
- Architect: James Wetmore
- Architectural style: Classical Revival
- MPS: US Post Offices in New York State, 1858-1943, TR
- NRHP reference No.: 88002387
- Added to NRHP: May 11, 1989

The U.S. Post Office in Nyack, New York, is located on South Broadway in the center of the village. It serves the 10960 ZIP Code, which covers South Nyack and Upper Nyack in addition to the village.

It was built in 1932 in the Classical Revival architectural style, a mode rarely used for American post offices between the wars. In the front lobby are several murals depicting scenes from local history. In 1988 it was listed on the National Register of Historic Places, and in 2004 it was renamed to honor three victims of the 1981 Brinks robbery.

== Building ==
The post office is situated near the northwest corner of the intersection of Broadway and Hudson Avenue. The neighborhood is a mix of commercial, residential and institutional properties. A row of three-story brick buildings faces it from the south side of Hudson. A house is located on the north side of its driveway.

It is a one-story building of buff-colored brick in Flemish bond on a raised limestone-clad basement. The east (front) elevation is a central pavilion five bays wide with single-bay wings on either end. Limestone is also used for its quoins and window trim, including recessed panels above and below each one. A cornice of that material with blocks and parapet marks the roofline. "UNITED STATES POST OFFICE NYACK NEW YORK 10960" is set in gilded metallic letters on the frieze.

The three-bay side wings have similar limestone decorations save the cornice and recessed panels. The four-bay rear ends in a loading dock.

A set of stairs with neoclassical bronze railings and low stone walls with claw-footed tripod lamps leads up to the centrally located main entrance. They lead to a single metal and glass door, with transom of similar material, recessed between two fluted Doric pilasters with a full Doric entablature. After passing through a wooden vestibule and small foyer, they open onto a lobby floored with terrazzo in a checkerboard pattern and grey-veined white marble wainscoting to a height of seven feet (2.1 m) on the plaster walls, which have a decorative cornice.

On all sides but the west, there are murals by Jacob Getlar Smith of scenes from local history: Native Americans watching Henry Hudson sailing upriver in the Halve Maen, Dutch settlers building a log cabin and John André meeting Benedict Arnold. The north and east murals have decorative grilles as well. Two original circular bronze-and-glass customer tables remain.

== History ==
The first post office in the Nyacks was established as part of a store at a landing now in Upper Nyack, in 1835. When the Erie Railroad was completed through the area in 1870, it was put within commuting distance of New York City, and grew as residents who had previously come for the summer built large houses overlooking the Hudson River to the east and lived there year-round.

Congress authorized a permanent post office for the village in 1910, but it was never built. In 1926 it was reauthorized and, as the Great Depression started, construction finally began in 1931. It was opened the following year.

It was designed under the leadership of James Wetmore, then Acting Supervising Architect of the Treasury Department. Wetmore was primarily a lawyer, and the actual artistic direction of the Treasury at the time was set by Louis A. Simon, who became Supervising Architect himself in 1935. The choice of a building so firmly in the Classical Revival style is an unusual one for the time. After World War I, the Treasury, which oversaw the design and construction of post offices and many other government buildings, began preferring the newer Colonial Revival style for its post offices, particularly those in small towns like Nyack. Neoclassical touches were often combined with modernist forms for post offices in larger cities (such as Troy's).

Smith's murals were added in 1936. He had planned for them to cover all walls and be complemented by a series of smaller panels above the tellers' booths. If those were ever completed and installed, they have since been removed. The interior has been altered only by the addition of modern heating systems and lockboxes. On the outside, a new door has replaced the original double bronze doors and a wheelchair ramp has been installed across the front of the building to comply with wheelchair accessibility requirements.

In 2004 Senator Charles Schumer and Representative Eliot Engel secured passage of legislation officially renaming it the "Edward J. O'Grady, Jr., Waverly Brown, Peter Paige Post Office Building"— in memory of two local police officers and a security guard killed by members of the Black Liberation Army during the 1981 Brinks robbery at nearby Nanuet Mall. A ceremony was held in May of that year, at which relatives of the deceased spoke.

== See also ==
- National Register of Historic Places listings in Rockland County, New York
