= Louis A. Simon =

American architect (1867–1958)

- Simon c. 1927

Supervising Architect of the United States
- In office 1934–1939
- Preceded by: James A. Wetmore
- Succeeded by: Position abolished

Personal details
- Born: May 1, 1867 Baltimore, Maryland
- Died: May 11, 1958 (aged 91) Washington, D.C.
- Profession: Architect

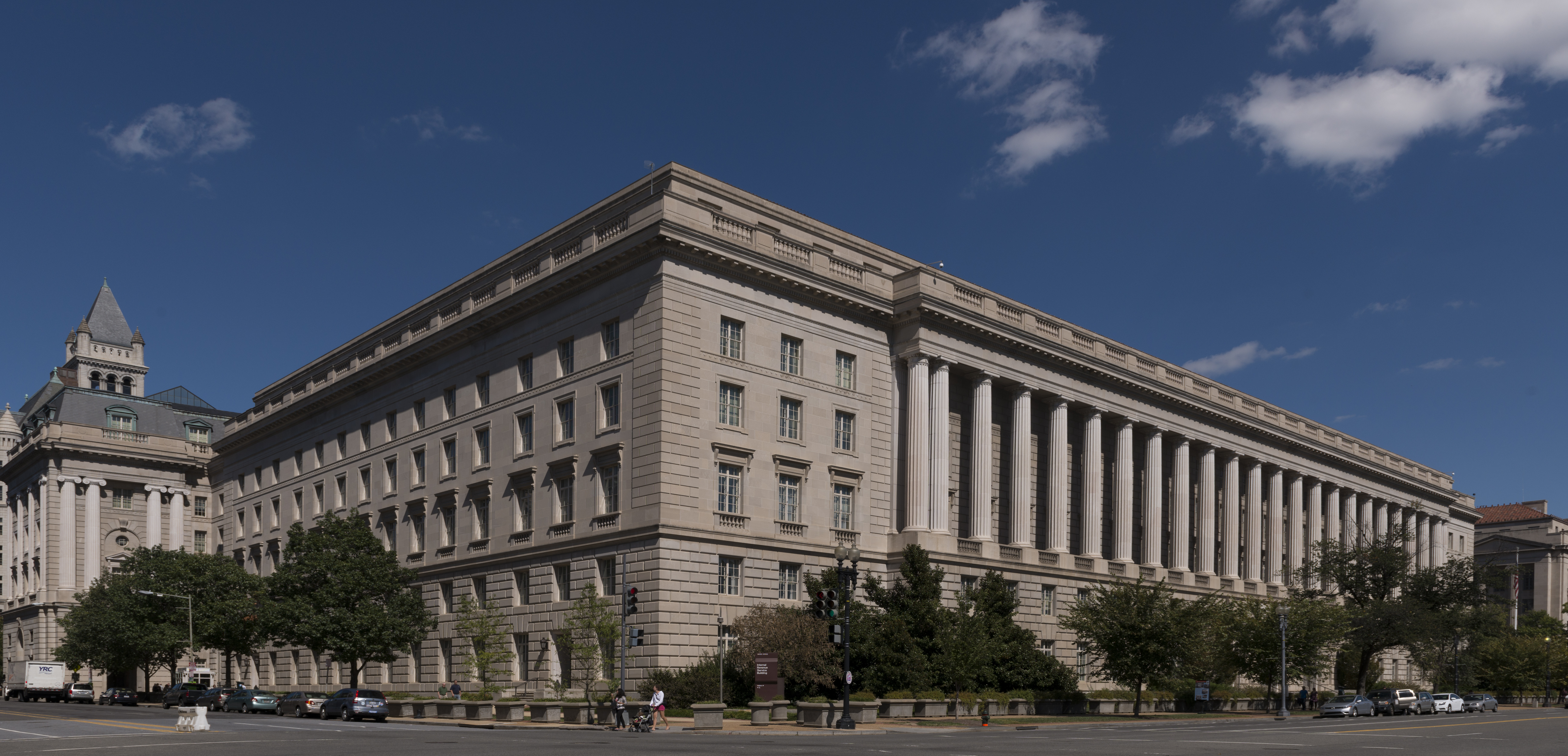
The Internal Revenue Service Building in Washington, D.C., designed under Simon's supervision and completed in 1931.

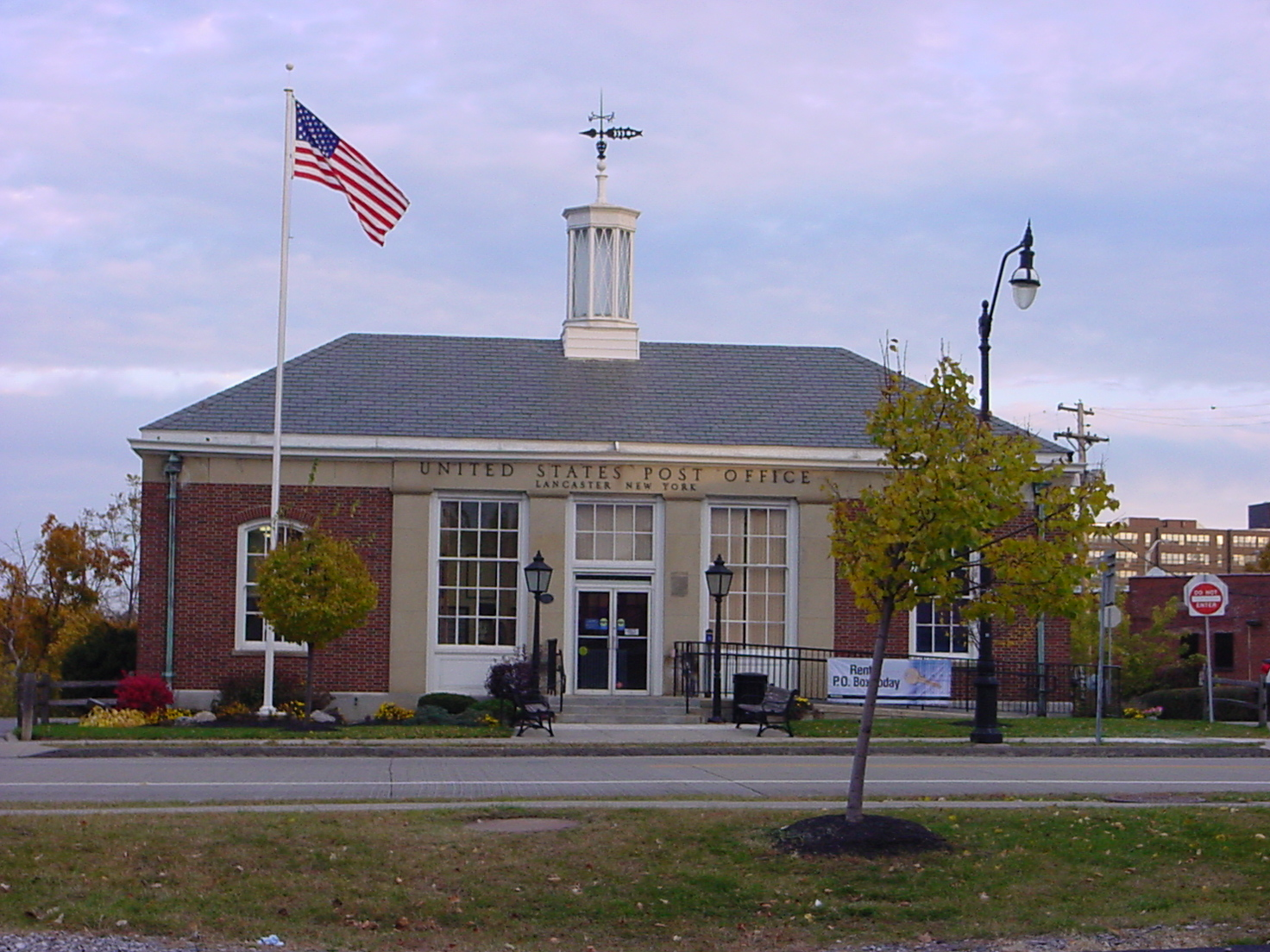
The United States Post Office in Lancaster, New York, completed in 1938, is an example of a standard plan.

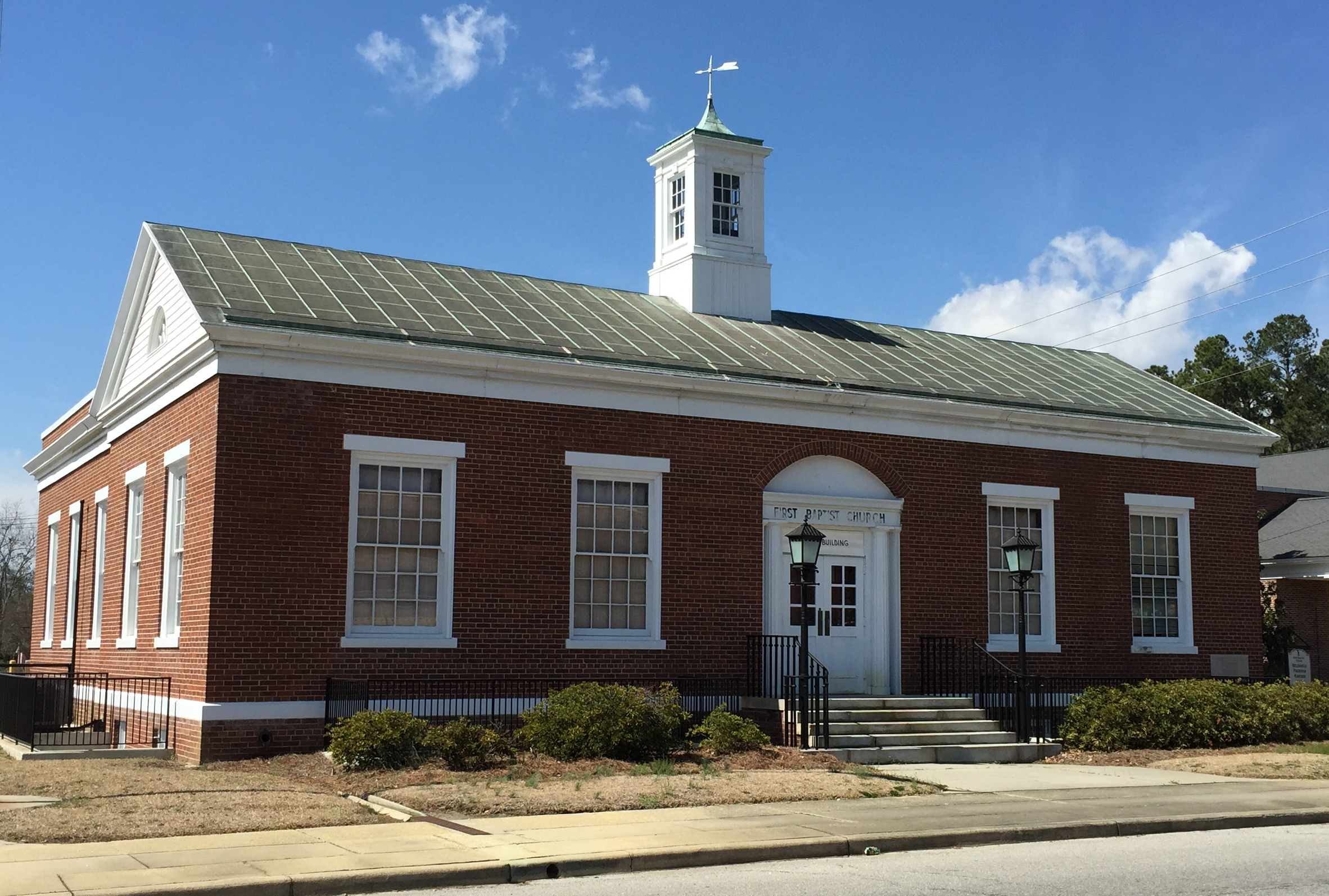
The former United States Post Office in Mullins, South Carolina, completed in 1939, is an example of the same standard plan in a different style.

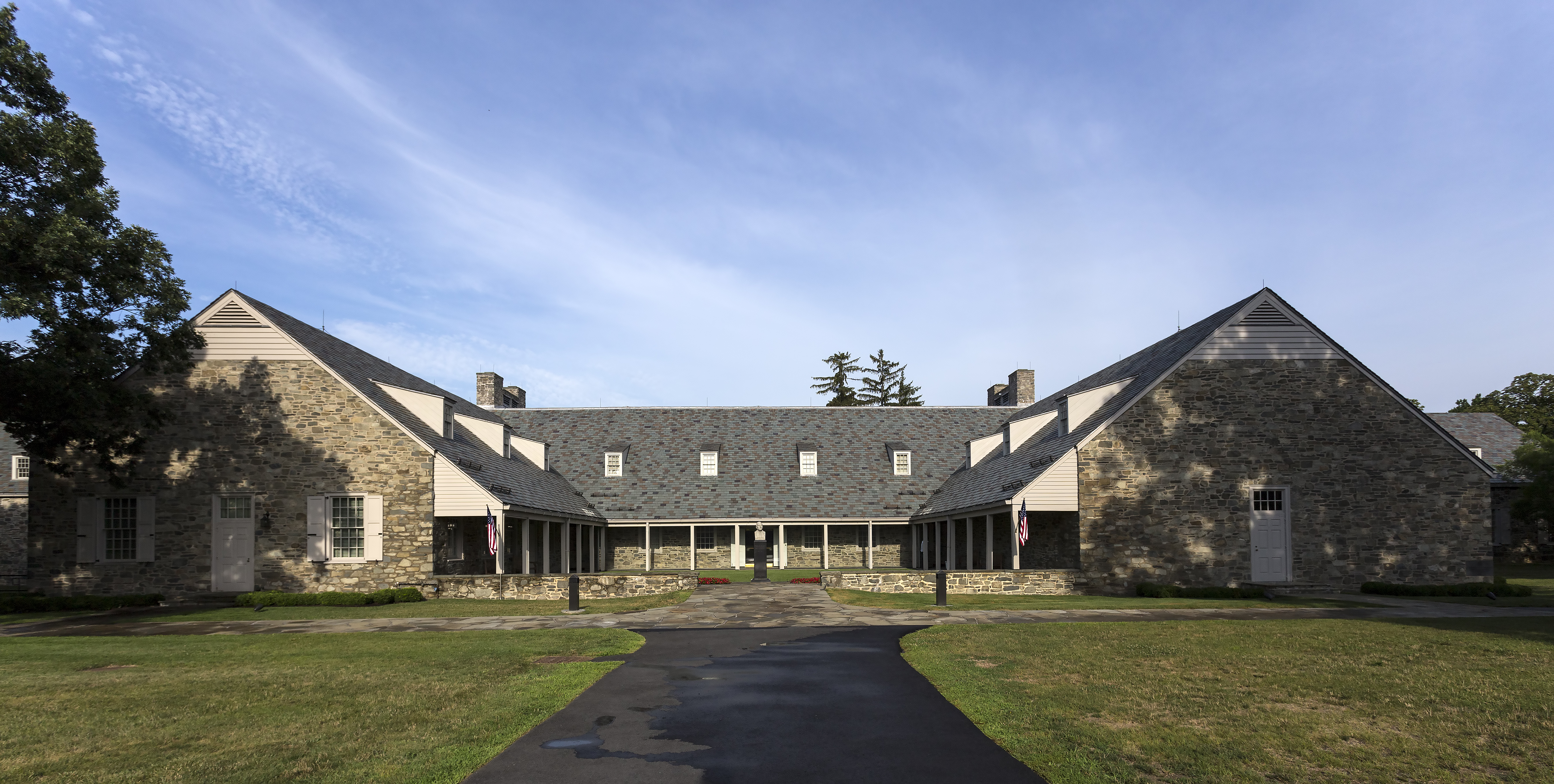
The Franklin D. Roosevelt Presidential Library and Museum in Hyde Park, New York, designed by Simon with consulting architect Toombs and completed in 1941.

Louis A. Simon FAIA (1867–1958) was an American architect. He spent almost his entire career with the Office of the Supervising Architect for the U.S. Treasury. He served as the last supervising architect from 1934 to 1939 and thereafter of the Public Buildings Branch of the Federal Works Agency until 1941. He was also principal architect for the Franklin D. Roosevelt Presidential Library and Museum in Hyde Park, New York.

== Life and career ==
Louis Adolphe Simon was born May 1, 1867, in Baltimore. He was educated at the Massachusetts Institute of Technology as a special student in architecture with the class of 1891, leaving the institute in 1889. Following a tour of Europe, he opened an architects office in Baltimore in 1894. In 1896 he joined the staff of the Office of the Supervising Architect of the United States Department of the Treasury in Washington. Then under the direction of William Martin Aiken, this office had charge of the design and construction of all federal buildings in the United States. Simon had been recruited by Edward A. Crane, a former classmate, and in 1905 he was promoted to chief of the drafting division by Aiken's successor, James Knox Taylor, succeeding Crane and Francis B. Wheaton. In this role Simon directed the work of a large number of drafters.

In 1915 James A. Wetmore, a lawyer who had worked with the office since 1896, was appointed acting supervising architect. As Wetmore was not an architect, Simon became the de facto director of design for all of the work produced by the office during Wetmore's administration. During this period Simon served on the board which planned the Federal Triangle, and obtained for the office the design of the Internal Revenue Service Building, construction of which began in 1928 and was completed in 1931. Other large projects designed by the office during this period include the Alaska State Capitol in Juneau, completed in 1931, the United States Post Office and Courthouse in Baltimore, completed in 1932 and the Federal Office Building in Seattle, completed in 1933. Wetmore retired in 1934, one year after a large scale reorganization of the Treasury Department by president Franklin D. Roosevelt, and was succeeded by Simon.

Though the office under Simon was responsible for the design and construction of many large buildings, he is often remembered for the introduction of standard, easily extendible plans which could be quickly executed for smaller communities. These would then be dressed in an architectural style thought appropriate for the region, whether Colonial Revival, Spanish Colonial Revival, Art Deco, or one of several other options. Both large and small buildings could also be designed by one of the many in-house consulting architects, including Howard Lovewell Cheney, Thomas Harlan Ellett, William Dewey Foster, Eric Kebbon, Lorimer Rich, Rudolph Stanley-Brown and Gilbert Stanley Underwood. Private architects were also hired for projects in their own communities provided they come to Washington to complete the work under government supervision. The decision to choose architects in this way by treasury secretary Henry Morgenthau Jr. was strongly criticised by the American Institute of Architects (AIA) and the American architectural press.

Simon was unwavering in his defense of what he considered a "conservative-progressive" approach to design in which he saw "art, beauty, symmetry, harmony and rhythm". Simon was credited by the AIA with raising the standard of design for federal buildings, especially since his appointment in 1934. For his efforts and for his long involvement with the AIA, Simon was elected a Fellow in 1937, the only supervising architect to be so honored.

In the face of AIA criticism and Simon and Morganthau's desire for quality public architecture, in 1938 a system of public design competitions was adopted to select architects for important buildings. A few of these competitions were carried out, including for Covington, Kentucky, and Leavenworth, Kansas, but the build up to World War II prevented its full adoption. In 1939 the office was moved from the treasury department to the Federal Works Agency, with Simon keeping his title. Works of the office during this latter period included the terminal of Washington National Airport, designed primarily by Howard Lovewell Cheney and completed in 1941. Simon retired that same year, and was succeeded in 1942 by George Howe. Outside of his regular duties, President Franklin D. Roosevelt selected Simon to be principal architect of his presidential library on the grounds of his Springwood estate in Hyde Park, New York. Construction on the building, designed by Simon in association with consulting architect Henry J. Toombs in Roosevelt's preferred Dutch Colonial Revival style, began in 1939 and was completed in 1941.

In addition to his AIA involvement, Simon was a member and president of the Association of Federal Architects and a member of the National Institute of Arts and Letters, now the American Academy of Arts and Letters, and the American Planning and Civic Association.

== Personal life ==
Simon was a parishioner of All Souls Church and a member of the Cosmos Club. Simon was married to Theresa B. McConnor. They had three daughters, all of whom died young. Simon died May 11, 1958, in Washington.

Preceded by James A. Wetmore	Office of the Supervising Architect; 1934–1939	Succeeded by Position abolished
