= DeLamater =

DeLamater or Delamater may refer to:

== Surname ==
- Cornelius H. DeLamater (1821–1889), American industrialist
- John DeLamater (1940–2017), American sociologist and sexologist

== Given name ==
- Delamater Davis (1886–1966), American politician from Virginia

== Locations ==
- Henry Delamater House in the Village of Rhinebeck, New York, part of the historic Beekman Arms & Delamater Inn
