= Balding Avenue Historic District =

Historic district in New York, United States

- U.S. National Register of Historic Places
- U.S. Historic district
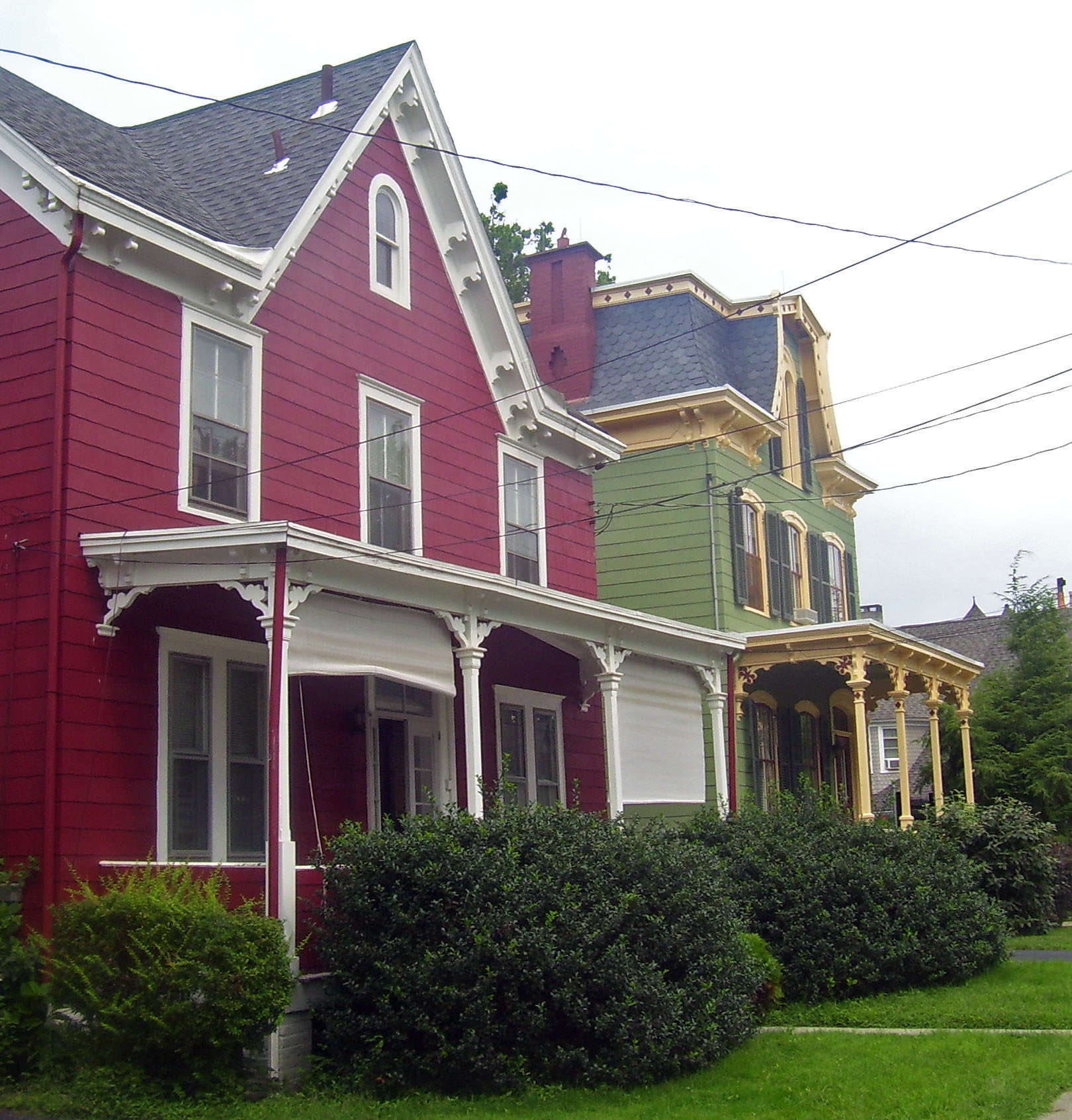
- Houses on west side of street, 2008

- Location within New York Location within the United States
- Location: Poughkeepsie, New York
- Coordinates: 41°22′29″N 73°55′35″W
- Area: 4 acres (1.6 ha)
- Built: 1872–1905
- Architect: Percival M. Lloyd
- Architectural style: Various Victorian styles
- MPS: Poughkeepsie MRA
- NRHP reference No.: 82001120
- Added to NRHP: November 26, 1982

The Balding Avenue Historic District is located along the street of the same name, between Mansion and Marshall streets, in Poughkeepsie, New York, United States. These four acres (1.6 ha) include 27 houses mostly built in the late 19th century.

Unlike some of the city's other residential historic districts, Balding Avenue was a middle class neighborhood, and its houses still reflect that. It was listed on the National Register of Historic Places in 1982.

== Geography ==
The district consists of Balding Avenue between its southern end at Mansion Street and the next intersection to the north at Marshall Street, and the lots of every house with a Balding address in that corridor. The southern end is just at the northern boundary of downtown Poughkeepsie, with several other historic buildings. The Queen Anne Style house at 73 Mansion is right on the corner (it was excluded from the district because it was a different size and shape from the Balding houses), and next to it is the Poughkeepsie post office. Across Mansion are the offices of the Poughkeepsie Journal. This block of Balding is shaded with large trees along the side of the street.

Within the district, the houses are of similar designs, ranging from two-and-a-half to three-and-a-half stories in height. All have clapboard siding. Various Victorian-era architectural styles are in evidence, from Second Empire to Queen Anne. Four houses in the Hudson River bracketed style are arranged in a row from 6-12 Balding.

All these houses exhibit a modest amount of ornament. Poughkeepsie's other historic districts recognize the homes of the wealthy (Academy Street, Garfield Place) or the working class (Union Street, Mill Street-North Clover Street). This is the only one in a middle-class neighborhood, as suggested by the minimal use of decorative detailing on the houses.

Only one home, at 1 Balding, is not considered a contributing property to the district. It was built in 1924, after the district's period of significance, two decades after all of the other houses had been completed.

== History ==
An 1867 map of the city lists Balding Avenue as a proposed street. It must have been built shortly thereafter, as the first houses on it, 14 and 27 Balding, both in the Second Empire style, were built in 1872. Six more followed, mainly in the middle of the block, during the rest of the 1870s. Most of the district was built out over the 1880s and '90s. Local architect Percival M. Lloyd, designed the classically detailed 32 Balding, the only house on the street for whom the architect is known, in 1896.

In the 1900s, 4 and 11 Balding closed out this building boom. The other corner lot at Mansion Street, 1 Balding, was finally built on in 1924. There has been no significant construction or modification since.
