= Building at 73 Mansion Street =

- U.S. National Register of Historic Places
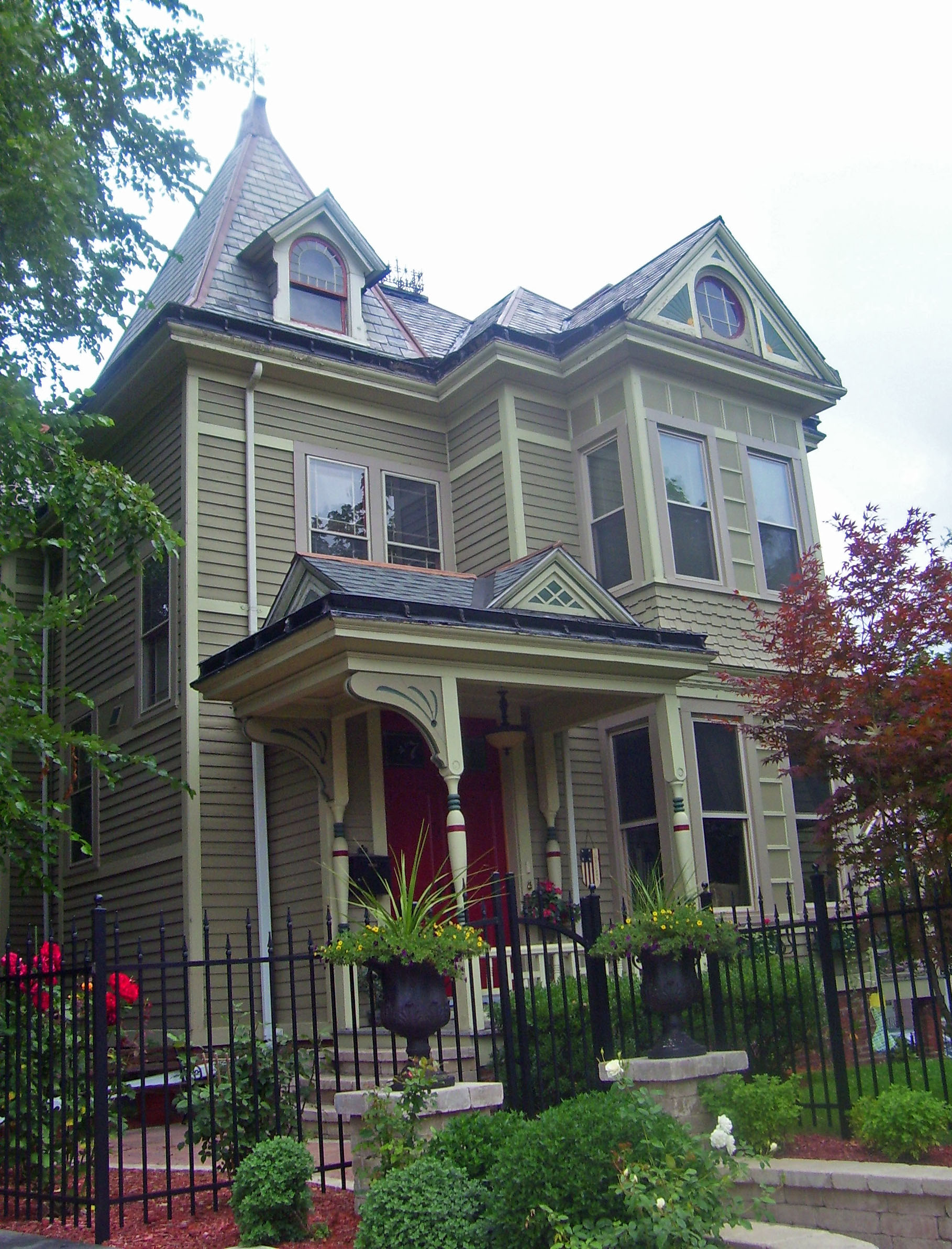
- Front (south) elevation and portion of west profile, 2008
- Location: Poughkeepsie, NY
- Coordinates: 41°42′25″N 73°55′37″W
- Built: ca. 1890
- Architectural style: Queen Anne
- NRHP reference No.: 97000531
- Added to NRHP: June 4, 1997

The building at 73 Mansion Street in Poughkeepsie, New York, United States, was first built around 1890 as a single-family residence. It is next to the city's post office and across from the offices of the Poughkeepsie Journal, at the corner with Balding Avenue.

It was built around 1890 by a local real estate attorney and has had many owners, and some other uses, since then. A prominent example of the Queen Anne architectural style in the city, it was left out of the neighboring historic district because the house was inconsistent with the Balding homes. Fifteen years later, in 1997, it was finally listed on the National Register of Historic Places in its own right, the only property in all of Dutchess County listed on the Register by its street address.

== Building ==
73 Mansion is a two-and-a-half-story frame house on a painted brick foundation sided in clapboard with decorative shingles and painted trim. It is topped by a hipped roof with the original slate, lower cross-gables and a pyramidal tower with weathervane, pierced by gabled dormer windows and a paneled and corbelled brick chimney.

Its facades are characterized by overlapping planes and textures, consistent with Queen Anne Style houses. Bays project, one of which has a cutaway bay window, asymmetrically placed on the south (front) facade and both sides. The east gable end has an arched vergeboard. Yankee gutters run along the roofline.

There are three entrances on the first floor, all with their own gable-roofed porch and patterned pediment. Two have curved, routed brackets as supports. The building's fenestration is similarly eclectic, including round and polygonal windows and colored-glass inserts next to angled muntins.

Inside, the floor plan follows the asymmetry of the exterior trim. It has much of its original finish as well: herringbone-patterned oak panels below the front bay windows, plaster ceiling medallions and crown moldings in each room, light fixtures, staircase railing and narrow-strip oak flooring.

Behind the house, on the property, is a modern garage added in the 1950s. It is not considered a contributing property to the listing.

== History ==
Charles Cossum, a local real estate attorney, built the house sometime around 1890. His office was three blocks away on Market Street. He had been very successful, and the location of his home on the northern end of downtown Poughkeepsie, within walking distance of his work, is characteristic of the pre-automobile era, when houses close to a city center were the most desirable.

His family owned the house until 1917, whereupon it went through a succession of many other owners until 1933, when a local pediatrician moved in and turned it into his home office. His family owned it for many years. In 1982, when the houses around the corner on Balding Avenue were designated as a historic district and added to the National Register, 73 Mansion Street was excluded because it was larger and more lavishly decorated than the more modest homes on Balding.

In 1995 it was sold to its present owner, who renovated and restored it with the help of federal tax credits. Two years later, in 1997, it was added to the National Register in its own right.

== See also ==
- National Register of Historic Places listings in Poughkeepsie, New York
