= United States Post Office (Beacon, New York) =

- U.S. Post Office
- U.S. National Register of Historic Places
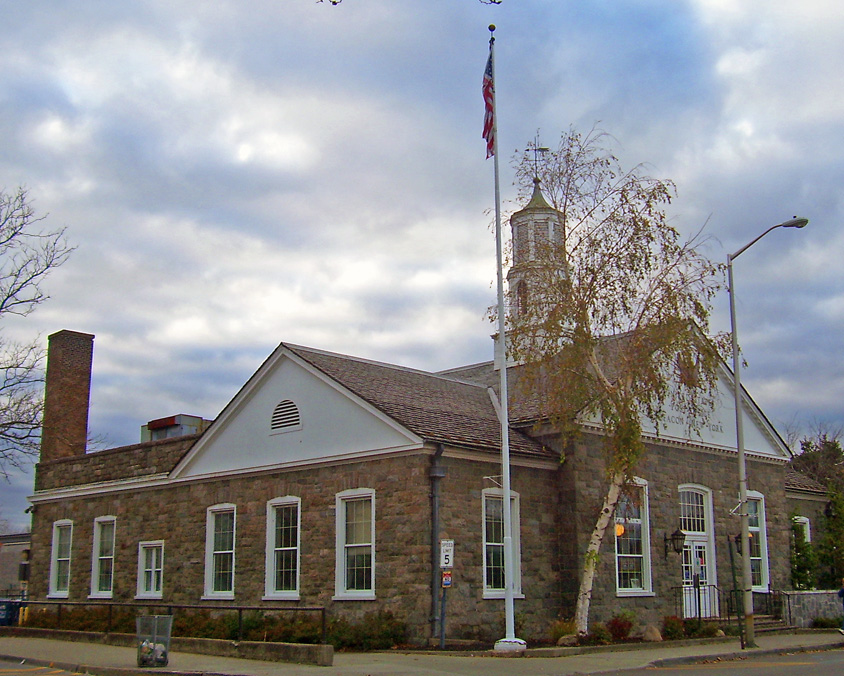
- East profile and north elevation, 2006

- Location within New York Location within the United States
- Location: Beacon, NY
- Coordinates: 41°30′14″N 73°58′6″W
- Area: less than one acre
- Built: 1937
- Architectural style: Colonial Revival
- MPS: US Post Offices in New York State, 1858-1943, TR
- NRHP reference No.: 88002456

The U.S. Post Office in Beacon, New York, is located on Main Street (New York State Route 52 Business). It serves the ZIP Code 12508, covering the entire city of Beacon and some of the neighboring areas of the Town of Fishkill. It is a stone structure in the Dutch Colonial Revival architectural style built in the mid-1930s. In 1988 it was listed on the National Register of Historic Places along with many other older post offices in the state.

While its style was not uncommon for post offices of the era, its fieldstone exterior is. Only a few other New Deal post offices in the state, most of them in Dutchess County towns along the Hudson River, used it. President Franklin D. Roosevelt's preferred that new post offices in his native region echo the architectural preferences of his Dutch ancestors who had been among the earliest settlers of the Hudson Valley, and the success of the Beacon post office may have encouraged him in that respect.

It was also the only federal building in New York designed by architect Gilbert Stanley Underwood, who lived in Idaho and primarily worked on buildings in the national parks of the West, closer to his home. Inside the building, Charles Rosen painted a map of the Hudson Valley on the lobby walls, in addition to some murals depicting historic events in the area. Both interior and exterior remain largely as originally constructed.

== Building ==
The post office is located on the south side of Main about 0.6 miles (0.97 km) east of Beacon's Lower Main Street commercial area. It is at the corner of Main and Veterans Street, a short distance east of where Eliza Street intersects across the street. The neighborhood is heavily developed and urban. On both sides of the street are similar large commercial and institutional structures, most one or two stories tall. To the east is a smaller group of three-story attached brick buildings, with the Howland Cultural Center, an early work of Richard Morris Hunt also listed on the Register, two blocks east at the corner of Main and Tioronda Avenue, which runs alongside Fishkill Creek.

Behind the buildings on both sides of the streets are parking lots. To the southeast another Register-listed property, the 1709 stone Madam Brett Homestead, sits in the middle of a large woodlot on a block east of Teller Avenue. Otherwise the adjacent neighborhoods are residential.

The building itself has a minimal setback from both Main and Veterans streets. A group of coniferous trees screens the northwest corner; a white birch tree rises from the east side of the north (front) facade. Along the northeast corner is a driveway to the parking lot in the rear, with a small guardrail of metal set in fieldstone separating it from Veterans Street.

=== Exterior ===
It is a five-by-six-bay one-story rectangular building faced in uncoursed rough fieldstone. A three-bay wide middle section flanked by projecting one-by-three-bay wings. The two sections create a cross-gabled roof topped with slate and centered around a cupola. On the southwest and southeast corners the roofs are flat.

Three short steps lead up to the main entrance, with paneled wooden double doors flanked by decorative lanterns and topped with an 18-light transom set in a lintel with keystone. On either side are triple-hung eight-light sash windows with a similar treatment. The windows on the wings are six-over-six double-hung sash, also with gently keystoned lintels, except for the third bay from the south end, set with a four-pane casement window. At the south end is a covered platform with elevated loading dock.

On the north facade a denticulated cornice sets off the top of the first story of the middle section. It continues around the pedimented gable end, filled with a stucco tympanum. Within is a cast pewter eagle; below the words "United States Post Office Beacon New York" are spelled out in affixed metal letters in the entablature.

A molded wooden cornice is located along the roofline of the wings. Their gable ends are also stucco, but with a single louvered lunette in the center. The cornice continues along the south end of the main block, where it is topped with a parapet where the roof is flat. Brick chimneys rise from both flat sections.

The cupola has three stages. Its lower level is a square pedestal with molded cornice. Above it is a section with arched windows and pilasters. The third stage is an octagonal section with louvered vents. The roof of the cupola is a curved cone of lead-covered copper topped by a round finial that supports a weathervane.

=== Interior ===
Behind the main entrance doors is a vestibule of glazed wood and glass. The marble floor, white with grey veins, is complemented by a six-foot high (2 m) dado of the same material around the room in which post office boxes are set along the south wall next to a single large customer window. Marble is also used for the pilasters supporting the segmental arches that give into the alcoves at either end of the lobby. Their intrados are coffered with decorative rosettes.

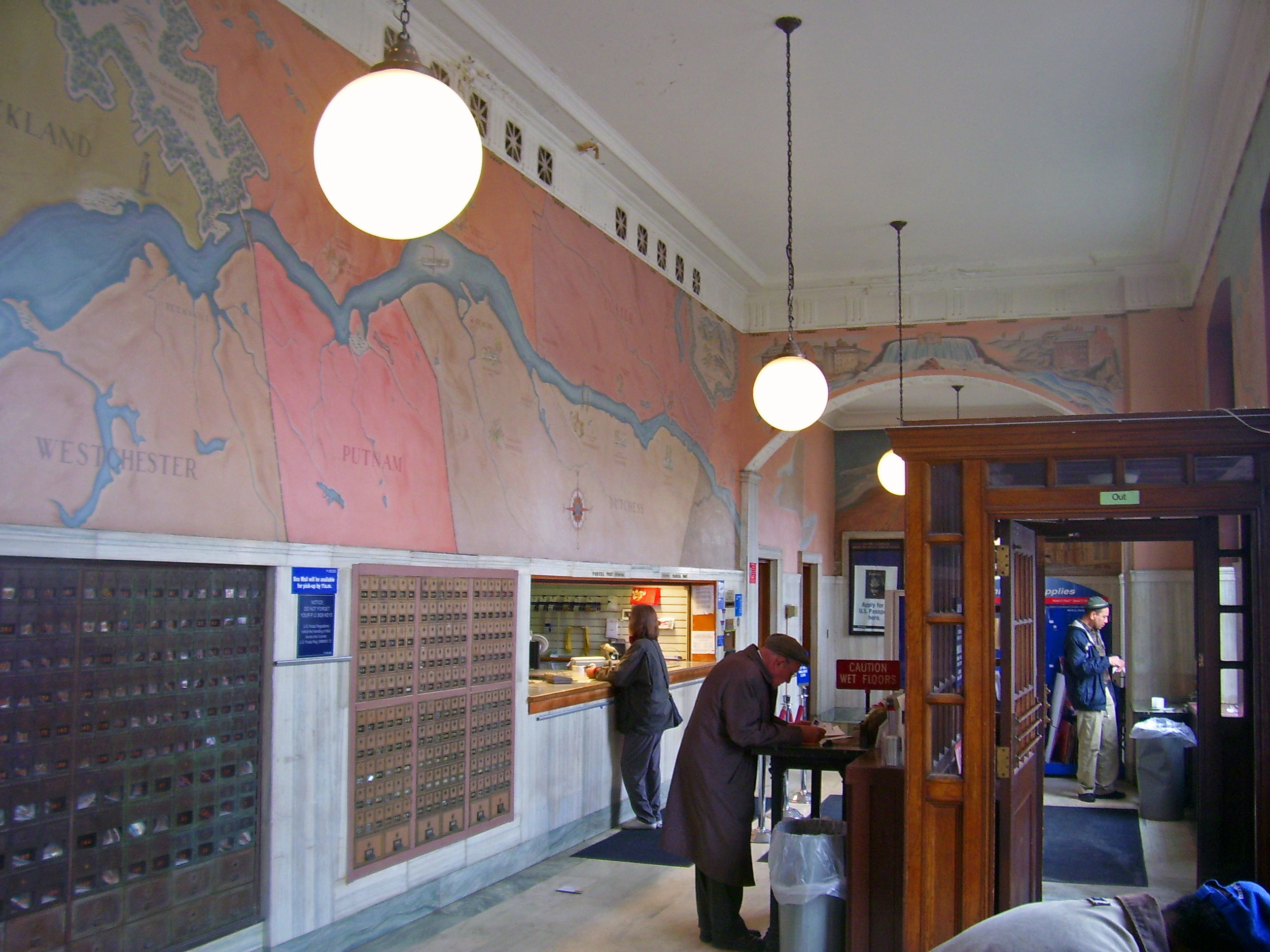
Lobby

Above the dado the plaster walls feature a large mural depicting a map of the Hudson Valley, showing county boundaries and scenic highlights. At the ends, in the rear of the alcoves, the murals depict local historic landscapes such as Beacon Mountain. Above the murals is a frieze with triglyphs interrupted by metal grilles.

Four glass globes hang from the ceiling by metal chains, providing illumination. Customer tables are of glass with metal stands. In the northwest corner a railing with a curvilinear design runs along the staircase to the basement. To the south are the non-public areas of the building, which include offices and sorting rooms.

== History ==
The city of Beacon was incorporated in 1913 following the merger of two small villages near the confluence of the Hudson and Fishkill Creek: Matteawan, in the area where the post office is presently located, named for a textile factory that used the creek for power; and Fishkill Landing, the area around Lower Main Street and the train station, one and a half miles (2.4 km) to the west on the river. It took its name from the mountain rising to its east, which had been the site of a bonfire pile meant to be lit as a beacon warning troops of the Continental Army in the valley if British ships were coming upriver in an attempt to retake it during the Revolutionary War. Its first post office was located at the corner of Main and North Cedar streets, two blocks west of the current location, in a building that, while constructed for that purpose, was only leased by the federal government.

It was always the government's intention to own its post office building in Beacon, and in 1931 amendments to the Public Buildings Act authorized the construction of over a hundred post offices in New York, including the current building at the current site, as an early response to the economic hardship of the Great Depression. However, it would be another four years until work actually began. After Congress appropriated $110,000 ($2.58 million in modern dollars) for the project in 1935, it took another two years to complete.

The choice of Colonial Revival as the architectural style for the new post office was not unusual; it was preferred for many of the new post offices built at that time in smaller communities around the country. The Beacon post office exemplifies many of the Colonial Revival's prominent features: large multipaned sash windows, symmetrical composition, gabled roofs with cupola, and pediments with fanlights. Originally, it was even more typical, as the triple-hung sash flanking the main entrance was 15-over-20 double-hung.

What distinguishes the Beacon post office from other Colonial Revival post offices of the era is its use of locally sourced fieldstone as a structural and facial material. Usually, brick was preferred for government buildings in the style. Beacon's was the first fieldstone post office in the state; only a few other ones used it. Most of them are elsewhere in Dutchess County, further north up the east side of the Hudson River, in Wappingers Falls (now used as that community's village hall), Poughkeepsie, Hyde Park and Rhinebeck.

Outside those four only the post offices in Ellenville and Harrison, in Ulster and Westchester counties respectively, use stone among New York post offices from the 1930s. Beacon's successful use of fieldstone may have inspired President Franklin D. Roosevelt, a native of Dutchess County, to dictate its use in the other four post offices, as it had been the building material of choice for the early Dutch settlers of the region, including his ancestors. He later intervened across the river in Ellenville when residents there complained to him about the Post Office's plan to use brick in defiance of their wishes. However, those post offices all were designed in imitation of specific buildings (some no longer extant) from the colonial era; only Beacon and Harrison were designed like other contemporary Colonial Revival post offices.

Architect Gilbert Stanley Underwood was familiar with stone, having used it for his buildings in national parks in the West near his Sun Valley, Idaho, home, such as Bryce Canyon Lodge, the Ahwahnee Hotel in Yosemite National Park and Grand Canyon Lodge, all later designated National Historic Landmarks. He had been retained by the Treasury Department's Supervising Architect to help with the increased workload brought on by the expansion of public building projects during Roosevelt's New Deal. Most of his work would be done in the West, and the Beacon post office was the only federal building he designed in New York, and a rare small building at a time when Underwood had been doing primarily large ones like the lodges and what is today the Harry S Truman Building in Washington.

Inside, Charles Rosen, who had been awarded the commission by the Treasury's Relief Arts Project (TRAP), painted the mural, one of 15 public artworks that program, which unlike the department's larger Fine Arts Section did not rely on competitions to select artists, sponsored in post offices around New York. In addition to the large map of the Hudson Valley, Rosen and his assistant Clarence Bolton painted small landscapes of the area with titles like View of Beacon from the River, The Old Power House and Waterfall, and The Old Swedish Church. Three years later Rosen was awarded the commission to paint similar landscapes of the Poughkeepsie area for that city's post office.

Since the post office was built, the most visible change has been the replacement of the front flanking windows. The other windows, originally 12-over-12 double-hung sash, have been replaced as well with their current six-over-six. Other windows, such as the small mezzanine windows that were once in dormers on the rear section, and an arched window on the south facade, have been filled in completely. Inside, the original teller windows have been replaced with one large one. Otherwise the building remains in its original condition and appearance.

== See also ==
- List of United States post offices
- National Register of Historic Places listings in Dutchess County, New York
