= Beekman Arms Inn =

Building in New York, United States

Beekman Arms & Delamater Inn

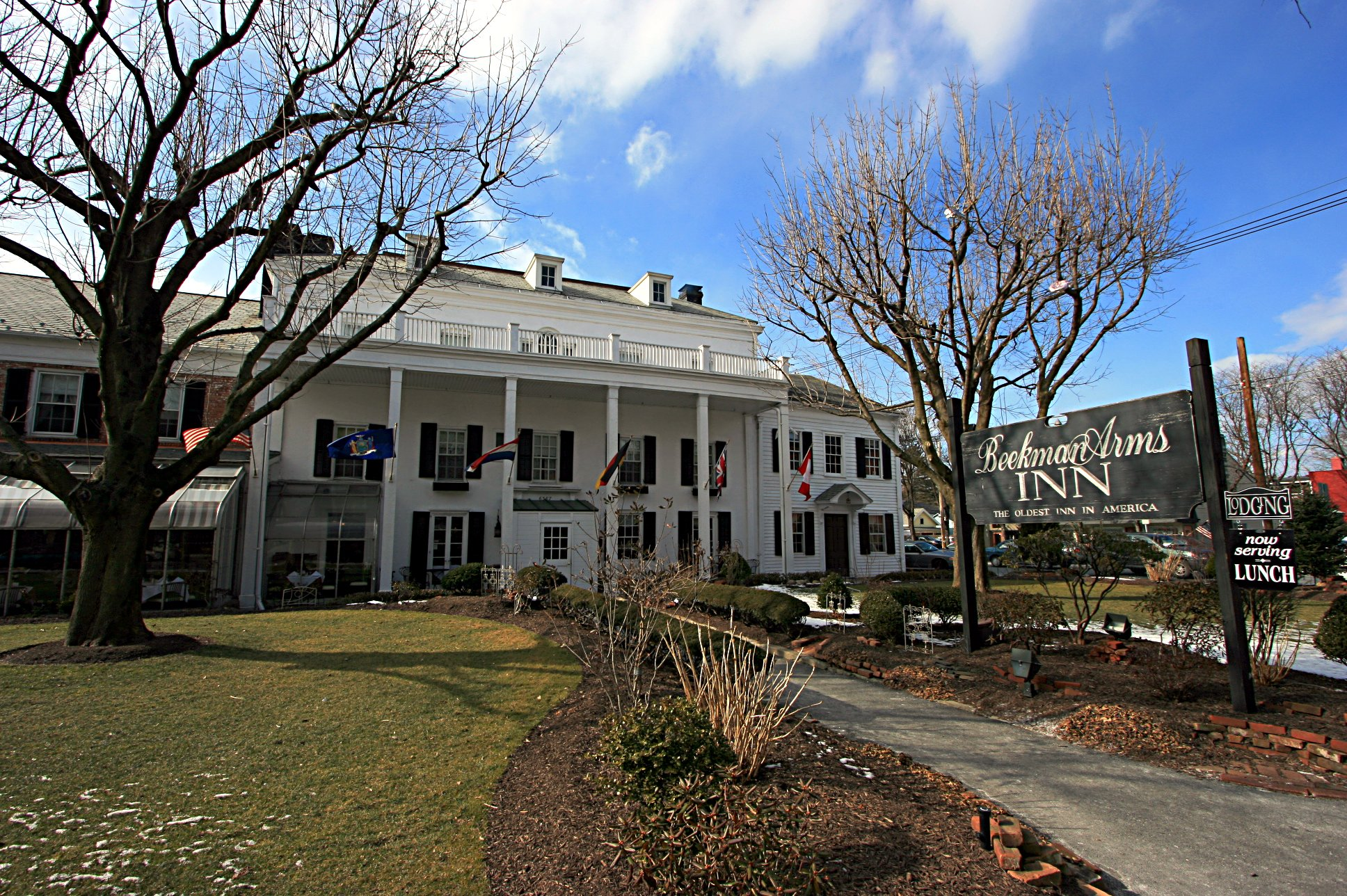
- Beekman Arms Inn, 2007

General information
- Location: 6387 Mill Street; Rhinebeck, New York
- Coordinates: 41.9266°N 73.9130°W
- Named for: Gerardus Beekman
- Estimated completion: 1766
- Governing body: Private

Other information
- Number of rooms: 73

Website
- beekmandelamaterinn.com

The Beekman Arms Inn, originally part of the Traphagen Tavern (Note: Other past names include Bogardus Tavern and Potter's Tavern) and advertised today as the Beekman Arms & Delamater Inn, is a historic inn located at 6387 Mill Street in the Village of Rhinebeck, New York. It is within the Rhinebeck Village Historic District, a historic district added to the National Register of Historic Places in 1979 as a cohesive area of preserved historic buildings. The Traphagen Tavern was founded by William Traphagen at the town crossroads in 1704 as a traveler's inn, and the Beekman Arms was added to the tavern in 1766.

The Beekman Arms Inn itself operates from the historic building on Mill Street, while the Delamater Inn is centered on the Henry Delamater House on nearby Montgomery Street, and also includes seven guest houses around a courtyard.

Since 2006, the Beekman Arms and Delamater Inn has been a member of Historic Hotels of America, an official program of the National Trust for Historic Preservation. The inn claims to be America's oldest continuously operated hotel.

== History ==
In 1704, William Traphagen, an early settler of Rhinebeck (then a village known as Ryn Beck), established a traveler's inn called the Traphagen Tavern in the village. In 1766, Arent Traphagen, the grandson of William Traphagen, relocated the tavern to its present location, where the King's Highway intersected the Sepasco Trail. When winter closed the river, the road was the only avenue of travel. It served as a stage-house for stage coaches. Stables were erected to accommodate the change of horses. It has remained in operation as a hotel ever since. Around 1765, a spring near the roadside supplied a well that became the "town pump".

During the last third of the 18th century, the inn, was then known as the Bogardus Tavern. Arent Traphagen died in 1769 and the tavern was purchased by Everardus Bogardus, great-grandson of the New Netherlands dominie. It was host to many leaders of the American Revolution, including George Washington, Philip Schuyler, Benedict Arnold and Alexander Hamilton. In 1775, the 4th Regiment of the Continental Army drilled on the Bogardus lot near the tavern.

By 1785, the King's Highway was now the country's Post Road, and in 1788, after independence, the village continued to grow. The Town of Rhinebeck, which contains the village, was organized. The current route of East Market Street was laid out the same year during construction of the Ulster-Saulsbury Turnpike, later to become Route 308. Everardus Bogardus died in 1799, and the tavern passed to his son Benjamin.

In 1802, Asa Potter bought the inn from Benjamin Bogardus. In 1804, during the race for Governor of New York State, both candidates had headquarters in Rhinebeck. Gen. Morgan Lewis had his at the inn, then known as Potter's Tavern, and Vice President Aaron Burr had his down the street at the Kip Tavern. Potter died in 1805. The tavern then came into possession of Captain Jacques, a former river sloop captain. It remained a rendezvous for politicians. Martin Van Buren was a frequent guest at Jacques' Tavern.

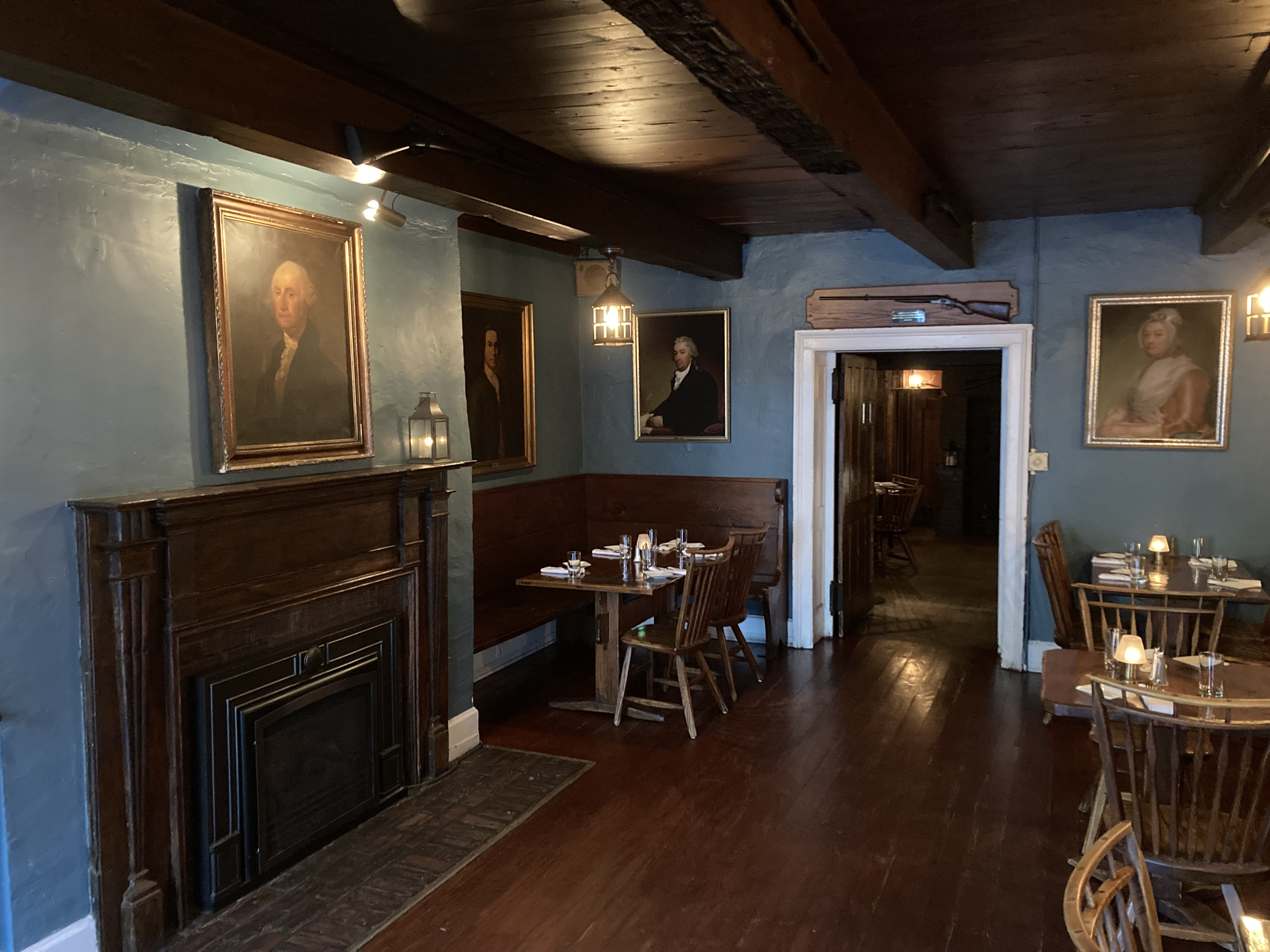
A dining room at the inn, 2024

In 1918, under the ownership of Tracy Dows, the inn was extensively renovated, with a ballroom being added. Dows's son Olin Dows, a United States Army artist who would serve in the European Theater of Operations during World War II, was commissioned to paint a mural in the Rhinebeck post office depicting the town's beginnings. Olin's Harvard classmate and close friend Thomas Wolfe visited the inn frequently, and his five years of prolonged stays at the inn have been said to have been the basis for what became his 1935 novel Of Time and the River.

In 1957, the inn was host to New York Governor W. Averell Harriman upon the dedication of the Kingston–Rhinecliff Bridge.

In 1958, Charles LaForge Jr. purchased the inn. LaForge and business partner Timothy Toronto also bought the Delamater House in 1979 and renovated its property, constructing a "Courtyard Complex." In the 1980s, a greenhouse room was added to the front of the Beekman Arms ballroom. George Banta Sr. purchased both the Beekman Arms and Delamater Inn from LaForge in 2002.

== Notable events ==
The inn has been host to numerous local and national historic events, including:

- Horace Greeley, a U.S. Representative and founder and editor of the New-York Tribune, was a frequent guest.
- William Jennings Bryan, a Democratic nominee for President of the United States in 1896, 1900, and 1908, spoke from a second-story window to an enthusiastic gathering on the front lawn.
- Benjamin Harrison and his running mate, Levi P. Morton, learned the convention had nominated them for president and vice-president while assembled with their supporters at the inn in 1888. Harrison became the 23rd President of the United States in 1889.
- U.S. President Franklin Delano Roosevelt, a resident of nearby Hyde Park and a frequent guest at the inn, concluded every campaign, both for governor and for president, by giving a speech from the front porch of the inn.

== See also ==
- National Register of Historic Places listings in Rhinebeck, New York
- Rhinebeck Area Chamber of Commerce
- Henry Delamater House
