= United States Post Office (Old Chelsea Station) =

Historic post office in Manhattan, New York

- United States Post Office; Old Chelsea Station
- U.S. National Register of Historic Places
- New York State Register of Historic Places
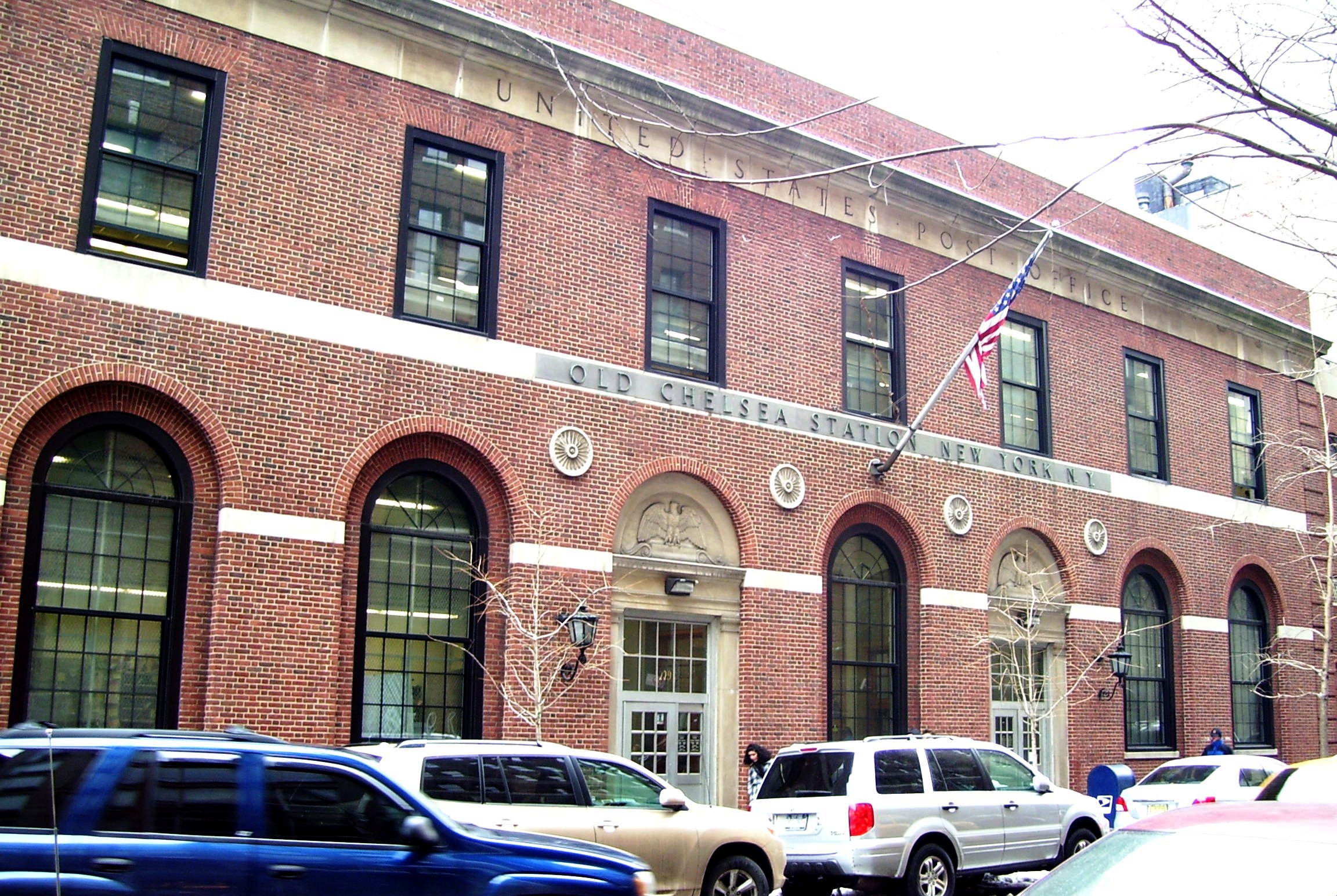
- (January 2011)

- Location within New York City Location within New York Location within the United States
- Location: 217 W. 18th St. Manhattan, New York
- Coordinates: 40°44′30″N 73°59′56″W
- Area: less than one acre
- Built: 1935
- Architect: Kebbon, Eric; Fiene, Paul
- Architectural style: Colonial Revival
- MPS: US Post Offices in New York State, 1858-1943, TR
- NRHP reference No.: 88002365
- NYSRHP No.: 06101.001786

Significant dates
- Added to NRHP: May 11, 1989
- Designated NYSRHP: May 11, 1989

The United States Post Office Old Chelsea Station, originally known as "Station O", is a historic post office building located at 217 West 18th Street in Chelsea, Manhattan, New York City. It was built in 1935, and designed by consulting architect Eric Kebbon for the Office of the Supervising Architect. The building is a seven-bay-wide two-story brick building, trimmed in limestone in the Colonial Revival style. The main entrance features a ten light transom, Doric order pilasters, and a blind stone fanlight with carved eagles. The interior features two bas relief cast stone panels of woodland animals titled "Deer" and "Bear" executed in 1938 by artist Paul Fiene.

The building was listed on the National Register of Historic Places in 1989.
