= United States Post Office–Lenox Hill Station =

Historic post office in Manhattan, New York

- United States Post Office; Lenox Hill Station
- U.S. National Register of Historic Places
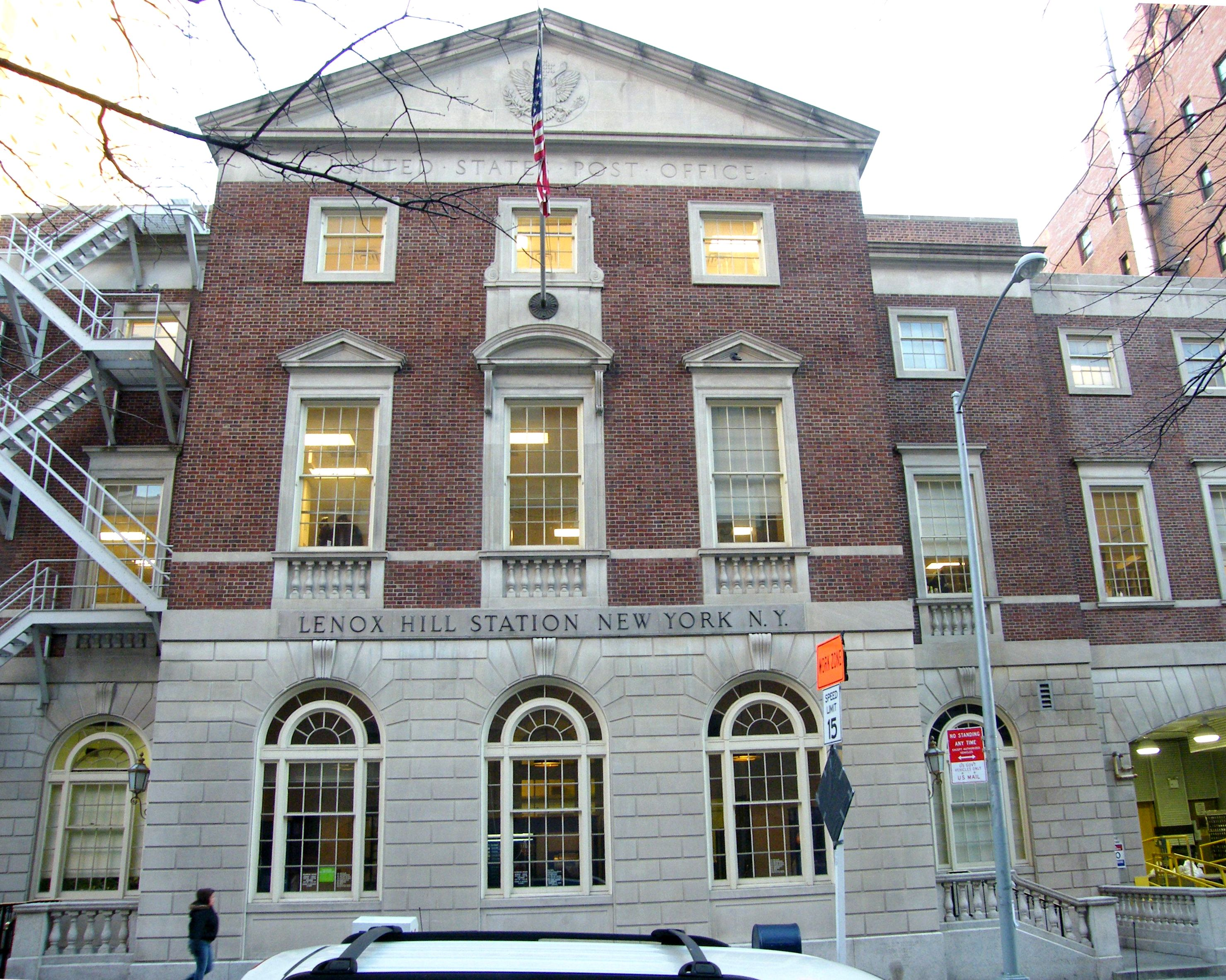
- (2009)

- Location within New York City Location within New York Location within the United States
- Location: 217 East 70th Street; Manhattan, New York City
- Coordinates: 40°46′4″N 73°57′36″W
- Built: 1935
- Architect: Eric Kebbon; U.S. Treasury Department
- Architectural style: Colonial Revival
- MPS: US Post Offices in New York State, 1858-1943, TR
- NRHP reference No.: 88002363
- Added to NRHP: May 11, 1989

The United States Post Office–Lenox Hill Station is located at 217 East 70th Street between Second and Third Avenues in the Lenox Hill neighborhood of the Upper East Side, Manhattan, New York City. It is a brick building constructed in 1935 and designed by Eric Kebbon in the Colonial Revival style, and is considered one of the finest post offices in that style in New York State. It was listed on the National Register of Historic Places in 1989, along with many other post offices in the state.

== Building ==
The post office is located on the north side of the street, midway between the two avenues. The neighboring buildings are large apartment houses, modern on either side of the post office and older across the street.

There are two sections to the building. Both are three stories in height, with the first story faced in rusticated limestone on a granite foundation and the upper stories in brick laid in Flemish bond with limestone trim. The five-bay main section has a three-bay central projecting front-gabled pavilion with a stone pediment. To the east is a three-bay wing with a segmental-arched garage.

On the main block, the south-facing first floor windows are all tripartite round-arched windows with 8-over-12 double-hung wooden sash windows in the center, five-pane sidelights and compound fanlights. They are complemented by a projecting keystone and radiating voussoirs.

The second floor windows are 12-over-12 double-hung sash with limestone balustrades in front on the main block. On the pavilion they are additionally topped with stone pediments; segmental arched with supporting brackets in the center and triangular in the middle. On the main block and the wing they have projecting stone lintels.

Above them, the third floor windows are four-over-eight sash with simple stone surrounds. The central window in the pavilion has a shouldered surround with volutes at the base. Below it a flagpole projects from a limestone panel between it and the second-story window below.

The pavilion's gable is trimmed in limestone. At its bottom is a plain frieze with "United States Post Office" carved into it. The entablature is set off by a cornice and has a central carved roundel depicting an eagle and shield. The shallow pitched roof is sheathed in metal.

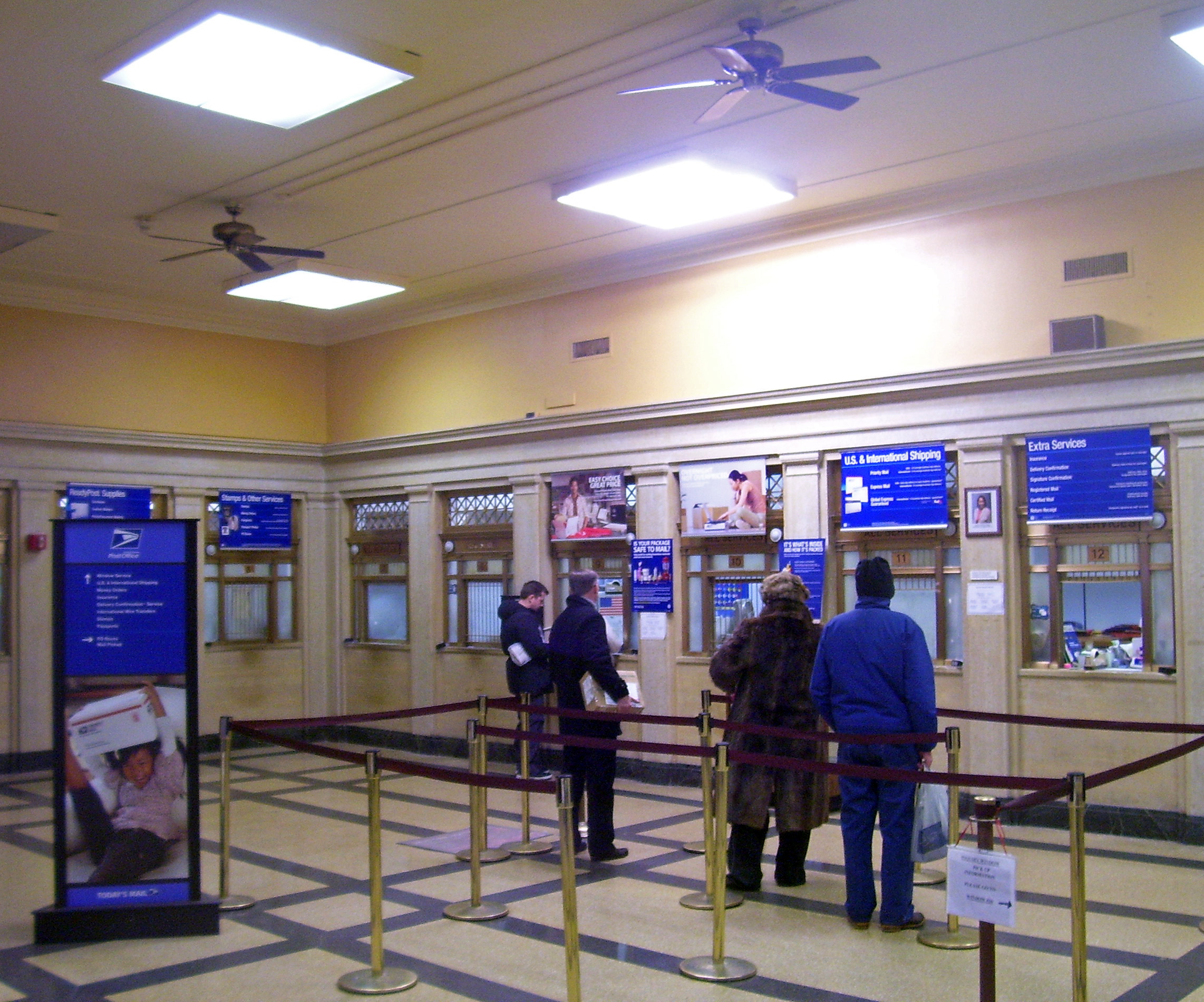
Lobby

Balustraded granite steps on either side of the projecting pavilion lead to the main entrances. They have bronze doors topped by blind fanlights with eagles carved in bas-relief. Original lamps are still in place. They open into a vestibule with rusticated limestone walls. The lobby has a terrazzo floor in gray, gold and black marble, green marble baseboard, applied Doric order in honey-colored marble around the entire room, square plaster cornice and shallow squared coffered plaster ceiling. Doors have limestone surrounds with marble transoms. Small Doric pilasters divide the teller windows, which retain their original bronze grilles. Three of the original customer tables remain. They are bronze with glass tops and Greek-inspired decorated bases.

== History ==
Lenox Hill was one of 12 post offices built in mid-1930s Manhattan as part of federal relief efforts in the face of the ongoing Great Depression. An amendment to the Public Buildings Act in 1930 gave the Treasury Department's Supervising Architect the authority to hire outside consulting architects to design buildings, to provide work for unemployed architects. In New York, many of those architects built post offices in the New York metropolitan area.

Eric Kebbon, still employed in private practice at the time, was retained to design five Manhattan post offices. Prior to working for the Treasury Department he had designed the AT&T building at Broadway and Fulton Street. Later he would, as the architect for the city's school system, design over a hundred school buildings.

Kebbon, unlike some other consulting architects, appears to have been given complete freedom in designing the Lenox Hill post office, which serves some of Manhattan's wealthiest neighborhoods. His design, which has been called the finest Colonial Revival post office in the state, is similar to his later Planetarium post office across town on the Upper West Side, but less restrained in its decoration. Many elements are common to other New York City post offices, such as the multi-story main block, full lot coverage and raised basement. Unlike many Colonial Revival post offices in the state, both inside and outside the city, it has two entrances on the side of the projecting pavilion instead of one entrance in the middle.

== See also ==
- National Register of Historic Places listings in Manhattan from 59th to 110th Streets
