= Lewis Tompkins Hose Company No. 1 Firehouse =

- Former Lewis Tompkins Hose Company No. 1 Firehouse
- U.S. Historic district – Contributing property
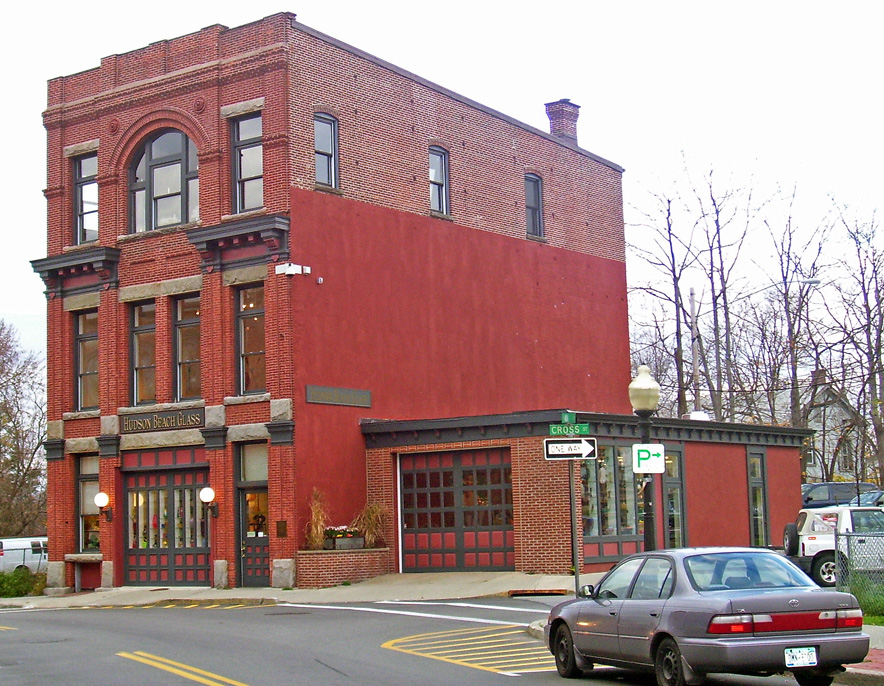
- The Lewis Tompkins Hose Company No. 1 Firehouse, today a glass shop

- Location within New York Location within the United States
- Location: Beacon, New York
- Coordinates: 41°30′30″N 73°58′34″W
- Built: 1893
- Architect: Schuyler Tillman and Benjamin Hall
- Architectural style: Second Empire
- Added to NRHP: 2004

The former Lewis Tompkins Hose Company No. 1 Firehouse, sometimes known as 5/33, was the first built in what later became the city of Beacon, New York. Designed by Schuyler Tillman and Benjamin Hall in a Second Empire style, it was completed in 1893. It is located at 162 Main Street, a block away from NY 9D, and was listed on the National Register of Historic Places on December 6, 2004.

== History ==
Beacon Engine Company was organized in the Village of Matteawan on October 5, 1886. In the winter of 1886 in the village of Fishkill Landing, Beacon's second fire company, the Lewis Tompkins Hose Company was organized. Much of the funding came from Lewis Tompkins, who owned the Dutchess Hat Works in Fishkill Landing. The first piece of rolling stock to be used by the company was an 1886 hand drawn hose cart which soon outlived its usefulness. Upon the death of Tompkins in 1894, members of the company decided to name it in his honor.

The 1886 hand drawn hose cart apparatus was replaced in 1903 with a horse-drawn wagon. This wagon was drawn by Ben, a large greyish-white horse that served for fifteen years before retiring. Tompkins Hose the only Fire Company in either Fishkill-on-the-Hudson or Matteawan to own a firehorse, while the others companies had to obtain one as needed from one of the local stables. Ben was replaced in 1918 when the company became the proud possessor of a shiny red Ahrens-Fox fire engine. Ben was later buried in Glenham.

=== Tompkins Hose Firehouse ===
In 1885, Tompkins Hose Firehouse was built at 162 Main Street in Fishkill Landing. A two-story building, it featured a tower and fire bell. At a special election held December 19, 1905 Village voters approved a bond resolution to fund the construction of a third story to the firehouse.

Tompkins Hose Company re-located to new quarters at 13 South Avenue in 1982. The old firehouse was taken out of service, and hosted a number of local not-for-profit agencies before being redeveloped into a glass studio. The building is a contributing property to the Lower Main Street Historic District.

In 2000 it became the site of Hudson Beach Glass, a company selling handcrafted glassware. On September 8, 2008 a plaque was placed on the old firehouse honoring the members of the Lewis Tompkins Hose Co.

== See also ==
- National Register of Historic Places listings in Dutchess County, New York
