= Rhinebeck Village Historic District =

Historic district in New York, United States

- U.S. National Register of Historic Places
- U.S. Historic district
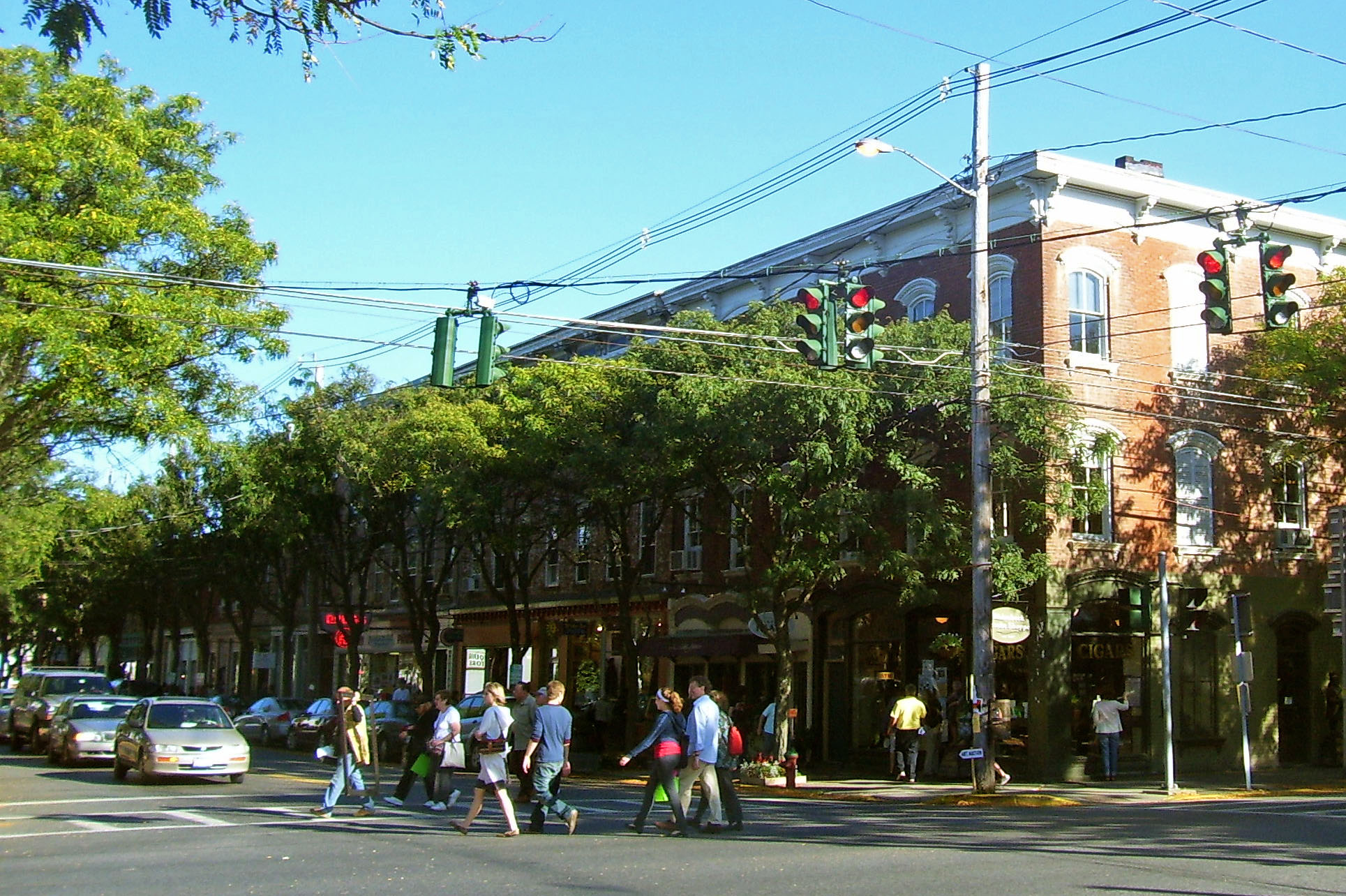
- Junction of Routes 9 and 308 downtown, 2007

- Location within New York Location within the United States
- Location: Rhinebeck, NY
- Coordinates: 41°55′36″N 73°54′45″W
- Area: 167 acres (68 ha)
- Built: 18th-early 20th centuries
- Architect: Stephen McCarty, R. Decker
- Architectural style: Colonial, Greek Revival, Late Victorian
- NRHP reference No.: 79001578 (original); 100006011 (increase)

Significant dates
- Added to NRHP: August 8, 1979
- Boundary increase: January 15, 2021

The Rhinebeck Village Historic District is located along US 9 and NY 308 in Rhinebeck, New York, United States. It is an area of 167 acres (68 ha) contains 272 buildings in a variety of architectural styles dating from over 200 years of the settlement's history. It was recognized as a historic district and added to the National Register of Historic Places in 1979 as a cohesive area of preserved historic buildings.

Its properties were developed primarily from the Colonial era to the end of the 19th century, when the district reached its present form. Three U.S. presidents have passed through here, most significantly, Franklin D. Roosevelt, who chose the design for a new post office during the 1930s, and spoke at its dedication. It is now one of the district's contributing properties. Today the area has become a popular local attraction, many of them housing boutiques and other small businesses. The streets are lined with large shade trees, bluestone sidewalks and other historic features.

== Geography ==
Due to the lot lines most of it follows, the district's boundary is irregular. It is centrally located in the village, with the bulk of the properties within it located in the residential neighborhoods to the north east of the 9-308 junction.

Starting from Route 9, the rear property lines of South Street lots, then Crystal Lake and Landsman Kill form the southern boundary all the way to the east village line. On the north side of Route 308, it follows the east side of Crosmour Drive almost to Starr Drive, then it returns to the rear lot lines on Crosmour, 308 and Beech Street. At Chestnut Street it turns to the west along the south side of the street, and then includes the houses along the north side midway down the block.

It continues along these bounds to the rear property lines along Montgomery Street (Route 9). It turns north along them to where 9 forks off Montgomery onto Spring Brook Avenue at Northern Dutchess Hospital and then crosses the street to include the properties on the west side of Montgomery, all the way down to West Market Street. It includes the northern side of West Market to the west village line, and then some of the properties on the south side of West Market. After following the rear lines along Mill Street (Route 9) down to just north of the Astor Home for Children, it crosses the road back to South Street.

The district includes several other streets, in whole or part, besides those on its boundary. Center and Livingston streets are included in their entirety. Several blocks of Mulberry and North Parsonage streets are also within district boundaries.

The area within the boundary is heavily developed. Most of it is residential, with some larger lots at the extreme points. Commercial use is concentrated on the tree-lined streets near the 9-308 junction. Larger businesses are east of the junction, with smaller storefronts in the area extending east several blocks along East Market Street (Route 308). Institutional use is represented with three churches within the district, and the town and village halls and fire station. All buildings are in a range of 19th- and early 20th-century architectural styles, from Colonial to Colonial Revival.

== History ==
European settlement in the Rhinebeck area dates to 1686, when a group of Dutch crossed the river from Kingston and bought 2,200 acres (890 ha) of land from the local Iroquois tribes. The name Rhinebeck is a combination of the name of the man who founded the town, Wilhelmus (William) Beekman (1623-1707), and his native town, Rhineland. Beekman was one of the original grantees of the area that became Beekmantown.

Later, Wilhelmus Beekman's son, Col. Henry Beekman (1652-1716), obtained a patent for the land, and saw a need for development to begin. The town of Beekman, Dutchess County, New York, is named for Col. Henry Beekman, who owned a grant there in 1703. He brought into the area Caspar Landsman, a miller, and William Traphagen, a builder.

In 1703 the New York colonial assembly approved money for the construction of the King's Highway, later known as the Albany Post Road and today most of Route 9. Three years later Traphagen bought a tract of land in Beekman's patent where the King's Highway intersected the Sepasco Indian Trail, the route today followed by Market Street. He built a house and tavern on the trail a short distance west of the King's Highway. This was the beginning of Rhinebeck.

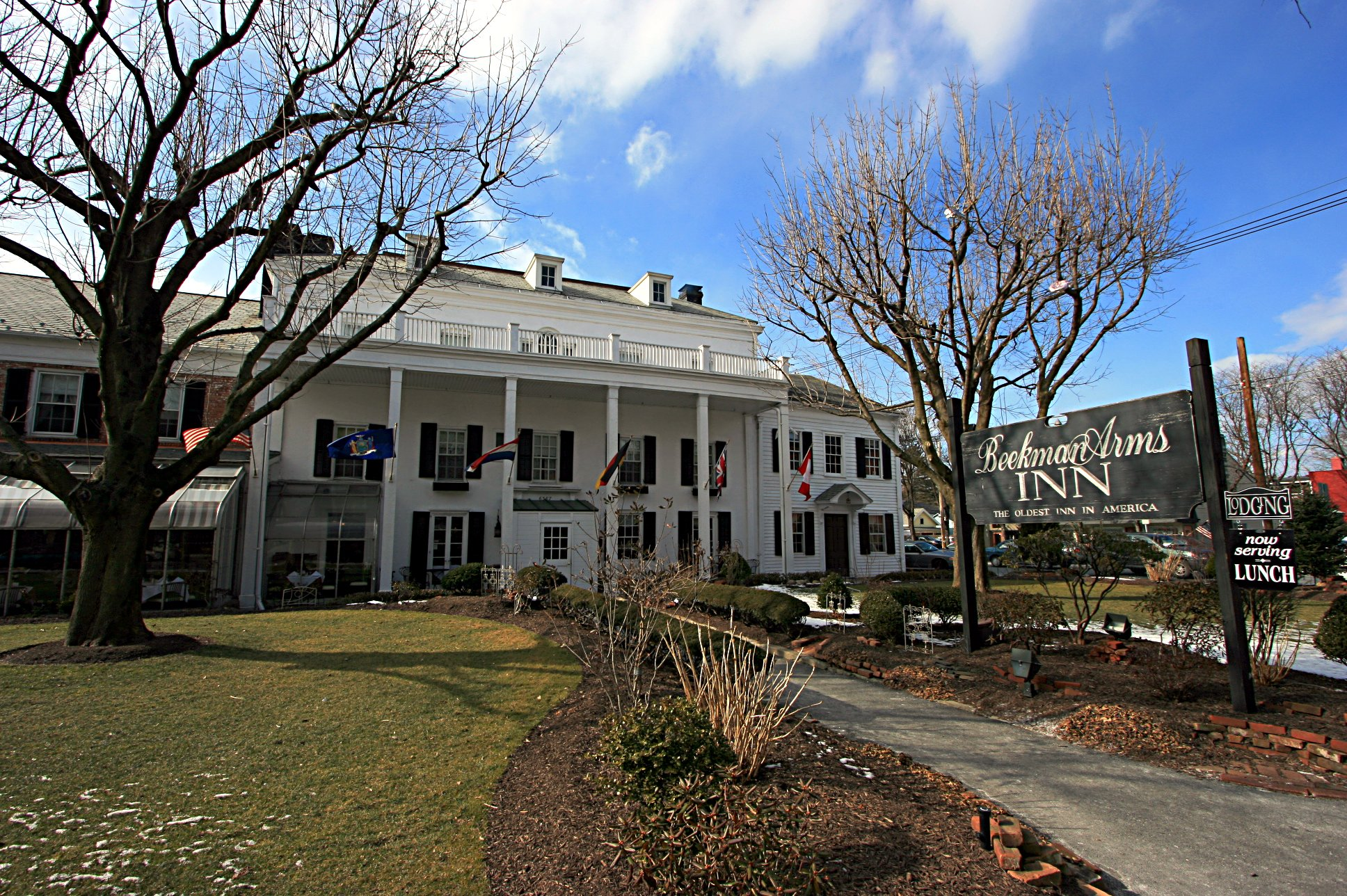
The Beekman Inn, claimed to be the oldest continuously-operated inn in the U.S.

A decade later, in 1715, Beekman's son brought in 35 Palatine Germans who had fled religious persecution at home and had just concluded an attempt to produce naval stores for the British government on the lands of Robert Livingston to the north in what is now Columbia County. The village grew with the new arrivals. New trades established themselves, and in 1733 the Reformed Dutch Church had been built. Its first building was on the site of its current one at Mill and South streets. In 1766 the beginnings of the current Beekman Inn were erected. It has remained in operation as a hotel ever since.

In the mid-1770s, a soldier named Richard Montgomery moved into the village with his new wife, a member of the Livingston family. He had just begun to settle into life as a farmer when the Revolution began. After being elected to the New York Provincial Congress, he was commissioned a general in the Continental Army, and died at the end of 1775 in the Battle of Quebec. The cottage still stands, although it was moved to 77 Livingston Street, where it houses the local Daughters of the American Revolution chapter; the street it was on was later named in his honor.

After independence, the village continued to grow. The Town of Rhinebeck, which contains the village, was organized in 1788. The current Dutch Reformed Church was built in 1802, making it the oldest church in the village. The current route of East Market Street was laid out the same year during construction of the Ulster-Saulsbury Turnpike, later to become Route 308.

Rhinebeck continued to attract politicians. George Washington visited in 1796, dining at Bogardus's, the second Traphagen tavern, when he stayed at a nearby friend's house. During the 1804 gubernatorial election, both Aaron Burr and Morgan Lewis used taverns in Rhinebeck as campaign headquarters.

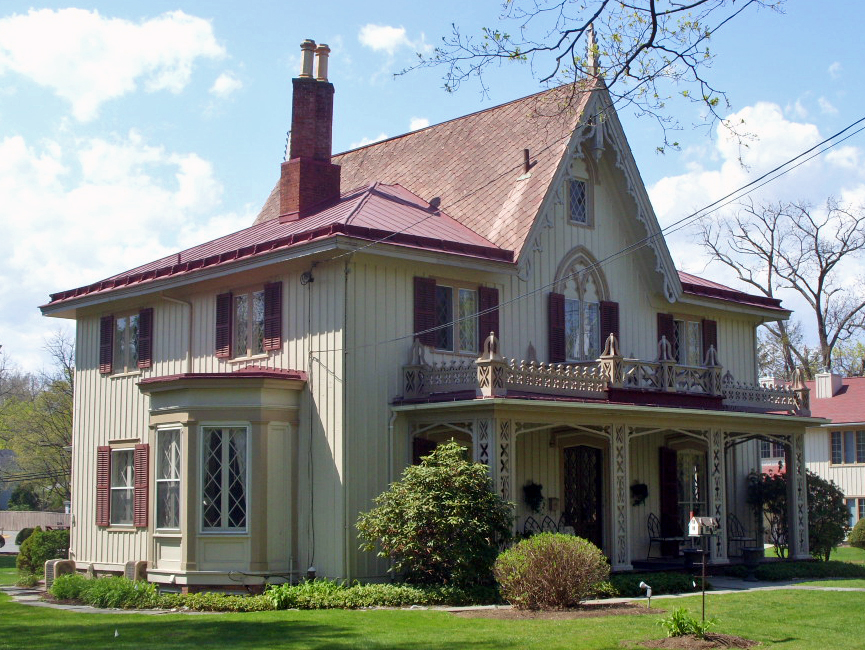
Henry Delamater House

The village was incorporated in 1834. Ten years later, Alexander Jackson Davis built the Henry Delamater House at 44 Montgomery Street. It still stands today, one of the best examples of the early use of the Gothic Revival style in American residential architecture.

By the 1850s, Rhinebeck had grown even further and acquired a reputation as a woodworking center. The town's name on milled products was a symbol of quality, and its furniture was shipped as far away as South Carolina. It was said to have no better in making carriages, coaches and sleighs. Some makers of clothing also achieved national prestige. The area was also acquiring a cachet as a location for the country estates of the Gilded Age wealthy.

In the late 1880s the village was visited by a president-elect. Levi P. Morton, a former congressman and ambassador to France, had settled in Bois Dore on Mill Street. Benjamin Harrison chose him to be his running mate on the 1888 Republican ticket. Harrison was visiting him in Rhinebeck later that year when word came to them that they had just been elected. Later, Morton would serve as governor.

The end of the 19th century saw a new industry center on Rhinebeck: the cultivation of violets. Roughly 20% of the village's population during the Gay Nineties was in this business in some way, and the total crop was later estimated to have exceeded a million dollars in value some years. Several of the "violet houses" built during this era survive and are located in the district.

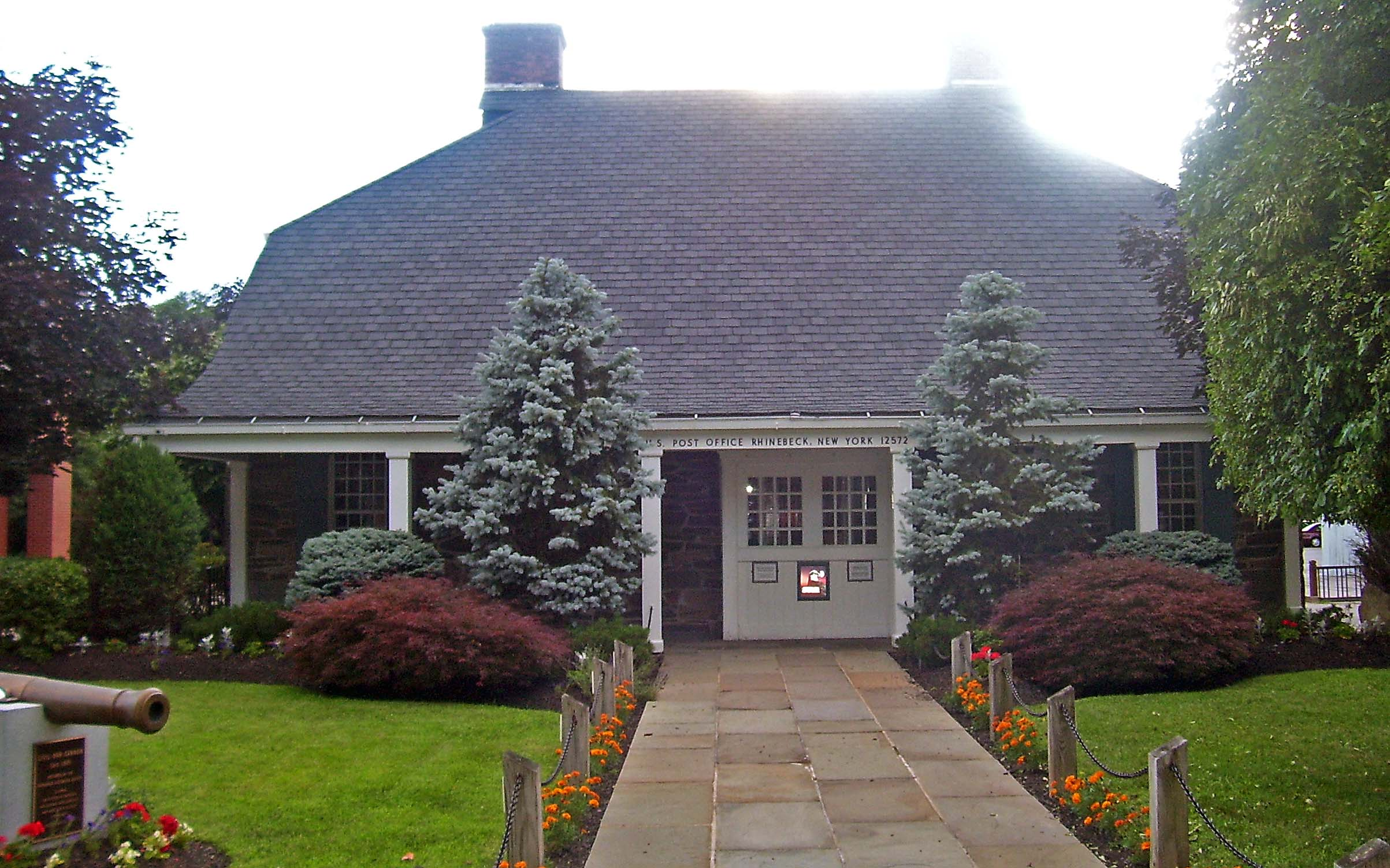
1939 post office

An 1890 map of the village shows it as nearly coterminous with today's historic district. That area has remained mostly as it was at that time. A third president, Franklin D. Roosevelt, himself a native of nearby Hyde Park, would play a role in the town's history during the later years of the Great Depression when he oversaw the design process for the new post office. He had long promoted Dutch-style fieldstone as a material for public buildings in the area, and told the architects to use Henry Beekman's house (burned in a 1910 fire) as their model and some of its remaining stones for the post office.

== Preservation ==
The village of Rhinebeck's zoning code creates a "special sensitivity" overlay district along Route 9 to preserve the historic character of that portion of the district, the part seen by most visitors to the town. It mandates that all new construction in residential areas preserve the appearance of a single detached dwelling, and that businesses in the area covered are not operated in a way to make it outwardly appear that they are a business.

In their current draft comprehensive plan, the village and town call for historic resources in the communities to be preserved with a historic district and formal architectural review process to ensure compatible, non-intrusive new structures and renovations. It asks that the town historian inventory all known historic sites in town, and that any eligible buildings not previously included be nominated to the National Register and its state equivalent.

== See also ==
- National Register of Historic Places listings in Rhinebeck, New York
