= United States Post Office (Bronxville, New York) =

- US Post Office-Bronxville
- U.S. National Register of Historic Places
- New York State Register of Historic Places
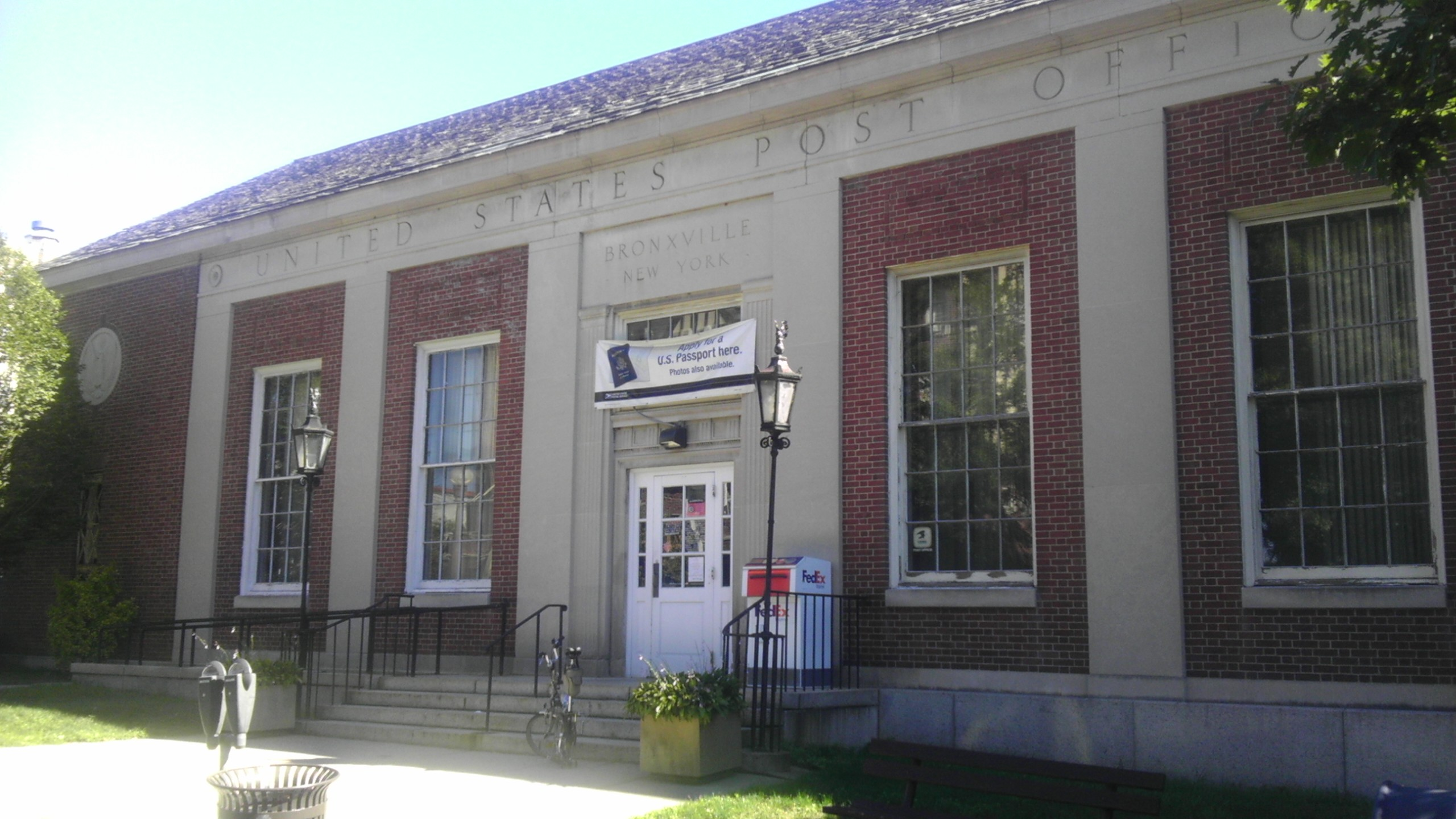
- US Post Office-Bronxville, September 2012

- Location within New York Location within the United States
- Location: 119 Pondfield Rd., Bronxville, New York
- Coordinates: 40°56′19″N 73°49′56″W
- Area: less than one acre
- Built: 1937
- Architect: Eric Kebbon, John Sloan
- Architectural style: Colonial Revival
- MPS: US Post Offices in New York State, 1858–1943, TR
- NRHP reference No.: 88002459
- NYSRHP No.: 11952.000168

Significant dates
- Added to NRHP: November 17, 1988
- Designated NYSRHP: November 17, 1988

US Post Office-Bronxville is a historic post office building located at Bronxville in Westchester County, New York, United States. It was built in 1937 and was designed by consulting architect Eric Kebbon (1891–1964) for the Office of the Supervising Architect. It is a 1 1/2-story building faced with brick and trimmed in limestone in the Colonial Revival style. The front facade features six extremely flat limestone pilasters that flank the central entrance. The lobby features a mural by John French Sloan (1871–1951) painted in 1939 and titled The Arrival of the First Mail in Bronxville in 1846.

It was listed on the National Register of Historic Places in 1988.

== See also ==
- National Register of Historic Places listings in southern Westchester County, New York
