= United States Courthouse (Tallahassee) =

Courthouse in Florida, United States

United States Bankruptcy Courthouse, Tallahassee, Florida
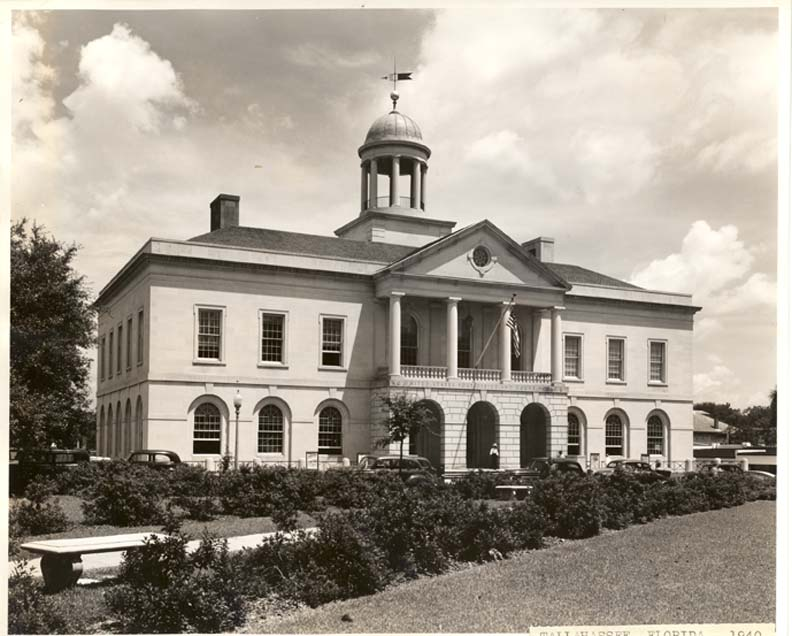
- The Courthouse as it appeared in 1937.
- Interactive map of the United States Bankruptcy Courthouse, Tallahassee, Florida area

General information
- Architectural style: Beaux Arts Classicism
- Location: 110 East Park Avenue
- Completed: 1936
- Cost: $318,000
- Owner: U.S. Bankruptcy Court

Technical details
- Floor count: 2

Design and construction
- Architect: Eric Kebbon

Website
- www.flnb.uscourts.gov/locations/tallahassee

The United States Bankruptcy Courthouse, Tallahassee, Florida, is a courthouse of the United States District Court for the Northern District of Florida.

== Building history ==
During the 1890s, the federal government funded construction of federal courthouses and post offices throughout the country. Supervising Architects of the Treasury Willoughby J. Edbrooke and Jeremiah O'Rourke prepared the architectural plans for Tallahassee's 1895 courthouse and post office building. Built on Park Avenue across the street from the Leon County Courthouse, it was demolished in 1964. The site of the current U.S. Courthouse was occupied by a county courthouse between 1838 and 1879. The Leon Hotel stood here from 1883 until it burned in 1925. During the Great Depression, a new post office and federal building was constructed on the site by the Works Progress Administration (WPA). Established in 1935, the WPA was a nationwide employment program responsible for public works.

Architect Eric Kebbon (1890-1964) designed Tallahassee's courthouse and the Beers Construction Company of Atlanta was the general contractor. Based in New York, Kebbon designed more than 100 public schools, and is noted for his work on the 1939 New York World's Fair Food Building with several other renowned architects, including Morris Ketchum Jr. and Edward Durrell Stone.

The courthouse's main lobby is decorated with eight murals illustrating scenes from Florida's history. The murals were funded by the Treasury Department's Section of Painting and Sculpture, a Depression-era program intended to employ artists. Hungarian-born American Edward "Buk" Ulreich (1889-1966) won a competition to paint the murals, which he completed in 1939.

The building originally housed the United States District Court for the Northern District of Florida, and served it as Tallahassee's main post office until the early 1970s. In 1979, the courthouse was listed in the National Register of Historic Places as part of the Park Avenue Historic District. The courthouse is now occupied by the U.S. Bankruptcy Court of the Northern District of Florida.

== Architecture ==
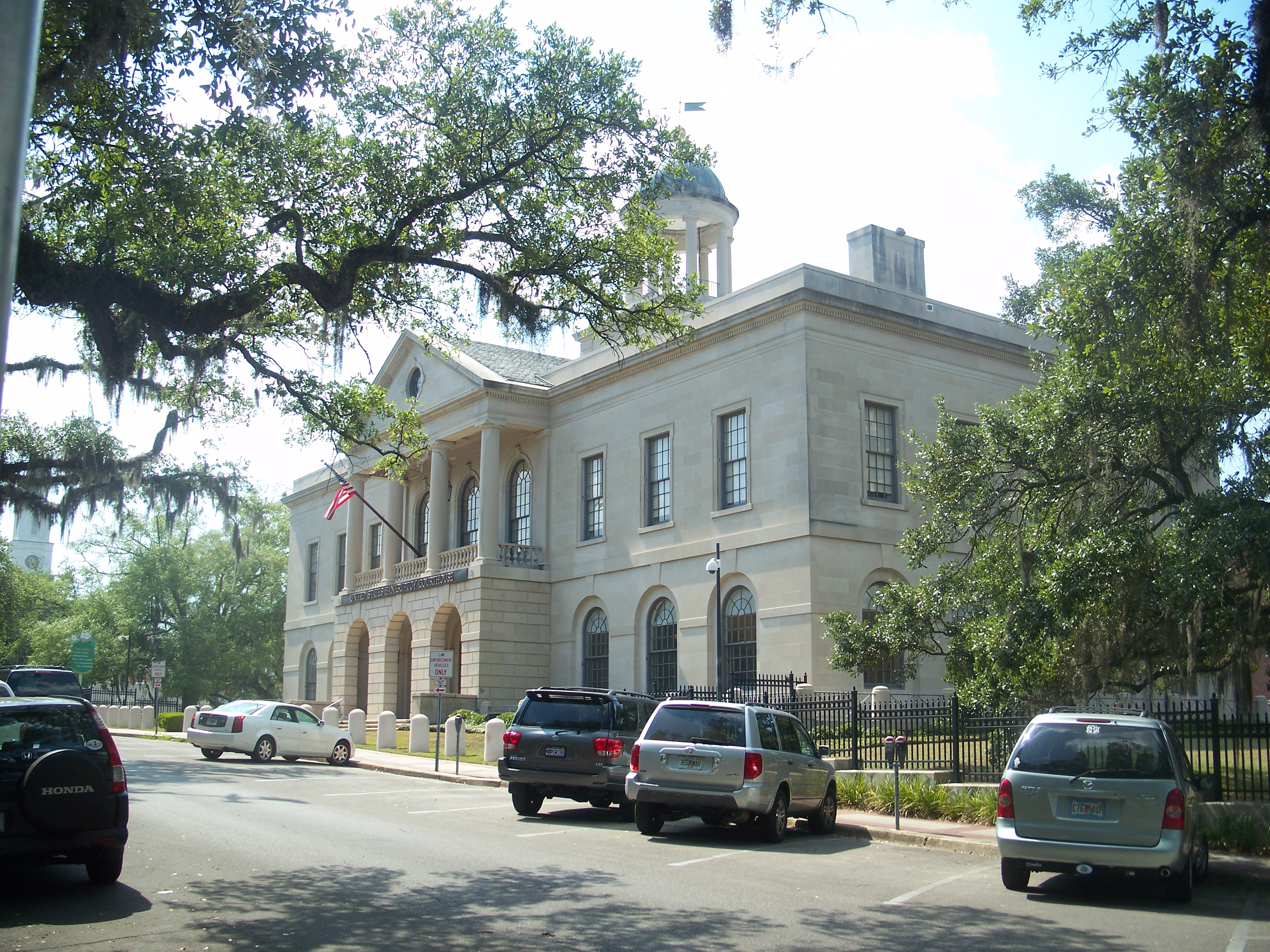
The Courthouse as it appeared in 2011.

Built in 1935–1936 at a cost of $318,000, the U.S. Court-house features an understated combination of the Beaux Arts and Neoclassical styles. It was designed by Eric Kebbon, who also designed the 1937 C.F. Haynsworth Federal Building in Greenville, South Carolina. With funds limited during the Great Depression, the courthouse lacks the exuberant detailing typical of many Beaux Arts buildings. The Beaux Arts style is known for its classically inspired details, variety of stone finishes, and projecting pavilions with colossal columns and pedimented entablature on top. Characteristics of the Neoclassical style include symmetry, smooth stone surfaces, and colonnades.

The courthouse has a granite foundation and the walls consist of limestone blocks. The overall massing and exterior design on all four elevations is simple, symmetrical, and classically inspired. The round-arched windows feature limestone keystones on the first story, while the second-story windows have heavy limestone frames culminating in keystones. Limestone belt courses extend along the first story and between the first and second stories. A cornice with an unadorned frieze and dentil molding runs below the roof's edge. Topping the hipped roof is a circular limestone cupola with Tuscan columns and copper roof with a brass finial.

The principal embellishment is a central temple-front pavilion on the south facade, highlighted by a coursed limestone base pierced with arches and an upper-level portico with an arcade. On the first story, the central arch frames the double door entry. The second story includes Tuscan columns and a limestone balustrade. Above the columns, the pediment features a simple frieze with dentil-block molding and an oculus (round) window with limestone surround.

The former postal lobby and main staircase are located at the south (main) entry. Original finishes include marble flooring and wainscoting, marble pilasters along the south wall, decorative crown molding, bronze ornaments and grills, and marble surrounds with keystones accenting the south wall's doors and windows. Marble writing tables and a bulletin board with marble surround are at the lobby's south wall. Below the north wall's crown molding are Ulreich's murals, depicting important events in Florida's history. The west and north walls have original brass six-panel doors with classically detailed surrounds. The lobby's original brass light fixtures with glass globes are typical of 1930s post offices. Faced with marble, the original curved staircase is at the lobby's southwest corner. Following the stairs' curve, the staircase railing has iron balusters with a wood cap and decorative bronze newels at each level.

The two-story main courtroom is on the second floor. The courtroom lobby retains historic terrazzo floors, marble baseboards, wooden chair rails, and paneled doors. The courtroom itself features wood wainscoting and fluted Ionic pilasters supporting a massive wood entablature with a dentil cornice, all of painted white pine. Arched windows on the south wall have wood trim with a keystone and rosette corner blocks. Original furnishings include the judge's bench, jury box, court rail, and spectators' benches.

In 2000, an annex was completed near the historic building to provide space for the U.S. District Court; this became the Joseph Hatchett United States Courthouse. In 2003–2004, the courthouse was subject to a $4 million renovation that included window and facade restoration, preservation of key areas such as judges' office suites, and remodeling of remaining areas for bankruptcy court, clerk, and trustee and U.S. Marshals use. Akin & Associates Architects, Inc. provided architectural design services, while Peter R. Brown Construction, Inc. was the general contractor. In 2005, the Tallahassee Trust for Historic Preservation recognized the project with an outstanding achievement award.

== History ==
- 1935-1936: Construction of the U.S. Courthouse
- 1939: Completion of lobby murals by artist Eduard Buk Ulreich
- 1979: Listed in the National Register as a contributing building to the Park Avenue Historic District
- 2003-2004: Renovation of the U.S. Courthouse building

== Building facts ==
- Location: 110 East Park Avenue
- Architect: Eric Kebbon
- Construction Dates: 1935-1936
- Architectural Style: Beaux Arts Classicism
- Landmark Status: Listed in the National Register of Historic Places as a contributing building to the Park Avenue Historic District
- Primary Materials: Limestone and granite
- Prominent Features: Limestone temple-front pavilion; Lobby murals depicting history of Florida; Curved marble staircase
