= Eric Kebbon =

American architect

Harold Erickson Kebbon Sr. (6 June 1890 – 18 April 1964) was an American architect who designed over 100 schools as well as several post offices, courthouses, housing developments and private residences.

Eric Kebbon was born in Brooklyn, New York on June 6, 1890, to Gustave Adolph Kebbon, born in Sweden, and Datie Louise Eldridge. He graduated from Somerville English High School in Boston, Massachusetts in 1908 and of which he was also the senior class president. He was a 1912 graduate from the Massachusetts Institute of Technology (MIT) with a Bachelor of Science degree in architecture and of which he was the senior class president as well as editor-in-chief of the Technique — MIT's 1912 yearbook. After graduation, he travelled in Europe and upon return, he became MIT's architect for buildings up to $6,000,000. With the approach of World War I he enlisted into the Army and was promoted to major in the U.S. Army Corps of Engineers from 1917 to 1919.

After the war, he married Jane Holmes Jutte, and they had two children. He also went into private practice designing private residences and housing developments. During the 1930s under the New Deal, Kebbon was hired by the U.S. Treasury to design several Court Houses and U.S. Post Offices. He worked as a consulting architect for the Office of the Supervising Architect and is credited as the design architect of at least six post office buildings. In 1938, he was appointed by the New York City Mayor, Fiorello La Guardia, to be the supervising architect for the NYC Board of Education Design and Construction Department, through which he designed and constructed more than 100 schools. He retired from the position on January 1, 1952, but maintained a continued working relationship with the DOE. He later went back into private practice and then for a short time, from 1956 to 1958, he worked with the noted firm of McKim, Mead & White, after which he retired from practice.

In 1952 he was elected into the National Academy of Design as an associate Academician. He was elected as a Fellow of the American Institute of Architects and held several positions during the 1930s, secretary and vice president, within the New York, AIA Chapter.

Eric Kebbon died in the Bronx, New York on April 18, 1964, at the age of 73. He was buried in Stonington Cemetery, Stonington, Connecticut and his simple modern form pedimented white marble gravestone with an ionic capital carved into the surface reads "ARCHITECT" below which is listed "BEAUTY - INTEGRITY - HUMANITY".

== Selected works ==
A number of Eric Kebbon designed buildings are listed on the U.S. National Register of Historic Places (NRHP).

- U.S. Post Office-Bronxville, built 1937, 119 Pondfield Rd., Bronxville, NY, NRHP-listed
- U.S. Post Office-Far Rockaway, built 1935, 18-36 Mott Ave., Queens, NY, NRHP-listed
- U.S. Post Office-Lenox Hill Station, built 1935, 221 E. 70th St., New York, NY, NRHP-listed
- U.S. Post Office-Old Chelsea Station, built 1935, 217 W. 18th St., New York, NY, NRHP-listed
- U.S. Post Office-Poughkeepsie, built 1939, 55 Mansion St., Poughkeepsie, NY, NRHP-listed
- U.S. Post Office-Planetarium Station, built 1937, 127 W 83rd St., New York, NY
- C.F. Haynsworth Federal Building, built 1937, 300 E Washington St., Greenville, SC, NRHP-listed
- U.S. Courthouse-Tallahassee, built 1936, 110 E Park Ave., Tallahassee, FL
- Joan of Arc Junior High School (JHS 118), built 1941, W. 93rd St., New York, NY
- Queens Valley School (PS/MS 164), built 1948, 138-01 77th Avenue, Queens, NY
- East New York Vocational High School (now Transit Tech High School), built 1941, 1 Wells Street, Brooklyn, NY
- High School for Home-Making (now Clara Barton High School), built 1938–41, 901 Classon Ave, Brooklyn, NY
- Midwood High School, built 1939–1940, 2839 Bedford Ave, Brooklyn, NY
- Fort Hamilton High School, built 1940–1941, 8301 Shore Road, Brooklyn, NY
