= United States Post Office (Poughkeepsie, New York) =

- U.S. Post Office
- U.S. National Register of Historic Places
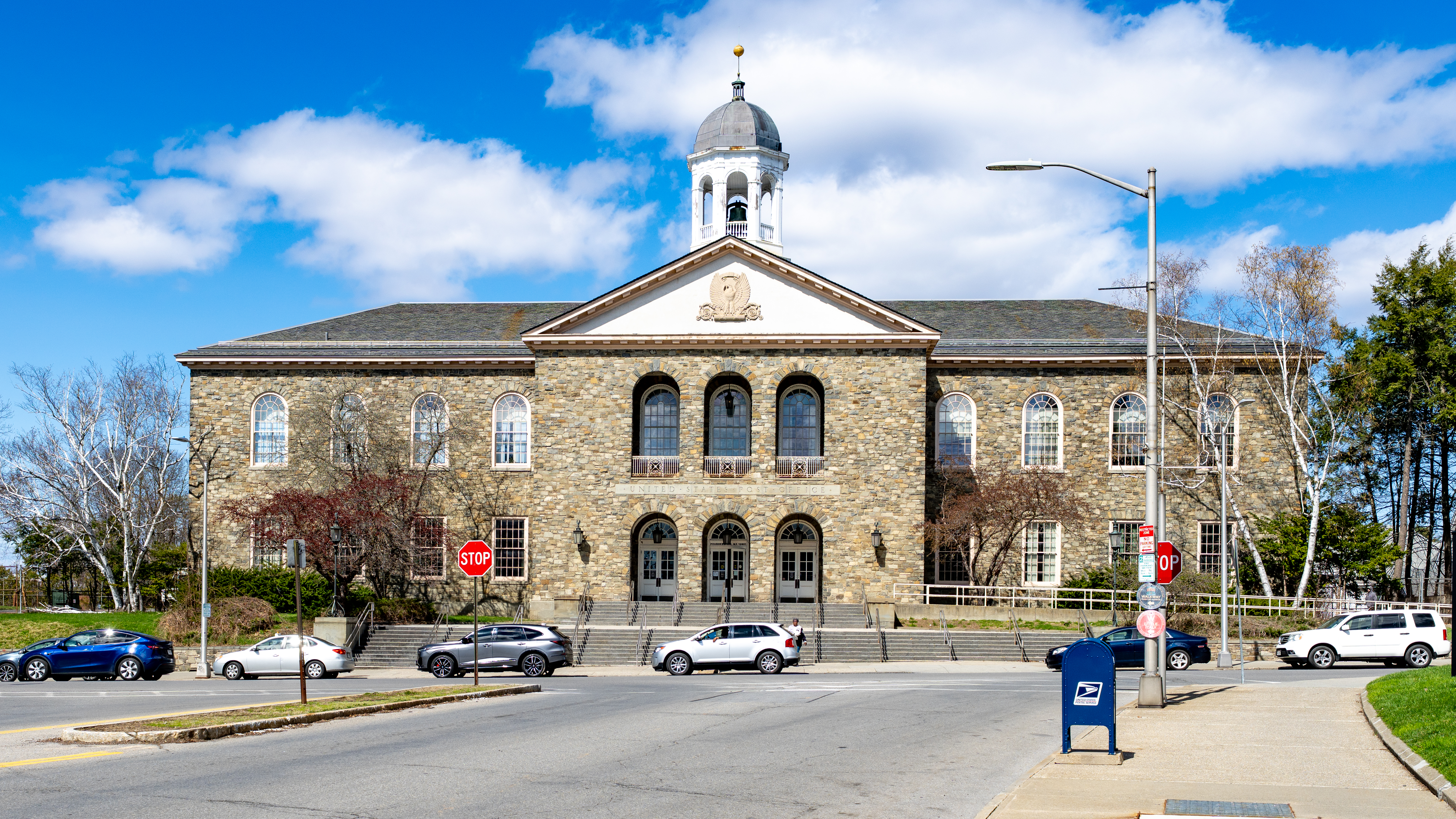
- Post office viewed looking north on Market Street, 2026
- Location: 55 Mansion St. Poughkeepsie, NY
- Coordinates: 41°42′21″N 73°55′40″W
- Built: 1937–1939
- Architect: Gerald Foster, Eric Kebbon
- Architectural style: Colonial Revival
- MPS: US Post Offices in New York State, 1858-1943, TR
- NRHP reference No.: 88002413
- Added to NRHP: 1989

The main U.S. Post Office, Poughkeepsie, New York, is located at the intersection of Market and Mansion Streets downtown; the address is 55 Mansion Street. The New Deal post office serves the 12601 ZIP Code, which covers the city of Poughkeepsie, New York and portions of the Town of Poughkeepsie adjacent to the city. It employs a hundred people and handles 300,000 pieces of mail a day and 10 million a year.

== History ==
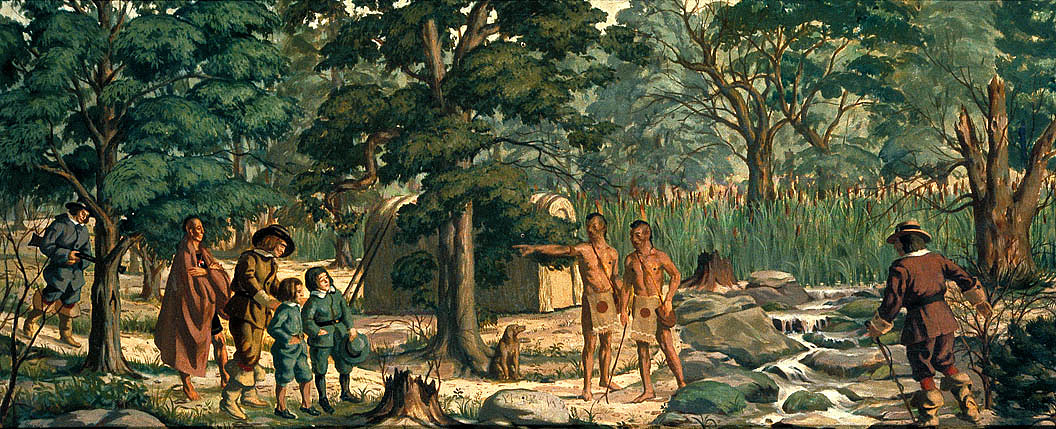
Gerald Foster's study for the 1939 mural titled Indian Resting Spot. The painting depicts a 1690 scene at "the reed covered lodge by the spring place", Poughkeepsie.

The building was the second of five post offices in Dutchess County built during the New Deal. It was the first for which President Franklin D. Roosevelt, a native of Hyde Park, took a close personal interest in the design. He had written in 1928 of his desire to preserve the stone buildings in the Hudson Valley built by early Dutch settlers of the region, including his ancestors, which he feared was disappearing. The simple and modest style of the stone houses built by all those early settlers regardless of wealth was, to him, an example that should be followed by everyone.

Earlier in the decade, nearby Beacon had received a new post office in local fieldstone designed by Gilbert Stanley Underwood. When Poughkeepsie's turn came, Treasury Secretary Henry Morgenthau demanded that it be made of irregular fieldstone in the Dutch style, modeled after a demolished county courthouse that had been built in 1809. Architect Eric Kebbon followed the design but originally turned in a building that was to use granite. Roosevelt personally ordered him to redesign it to his specifications and would not let construction proceed until it was.

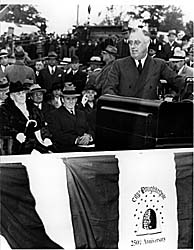
Roosevelt speaking at the dedication

Roosevelt laid the cornerstone himself at a dedication ceremony during celebrations of the 250th anniversary of Poughkeepsie's settlement on October 13, 1937. Five hundred workers would spend the next two years building the 63,000-square foot (5,670 m²) structure.

The final building included a lobby with five murals painted by artists commissioned by the Section of Fine Arts. The paintings depict scenes in local and state history, including the ratification of the United States Constitution by New York. The success of its design inspired Roosevelt to push for similar stone post office buildings in other Dutchess County towns along the river, and it influenced the similar design of new offices built nearby for the Poughkeepsie Journal newspaper. The Smithsonian Institution chose it as one of ten New York post offices among the five hundred most beautiful in the country. It has been on the National Register of Historic Places since 1989.

On October 22, 2008, the cupola, undergoing renovation at the time, was damaged by a fire, causing the building to be closed for a few days. The rest of the building remained undamaged. City fire investigators said the likely cause was accidental, from heat guns used by the painters working on it.

== See also ==
Other Hudson Valley post offices whose design Roosevelt influenced:

- Ellenville
- Hyde Park
- Rhinebeck
- Wappingers Falls (Now used as a municipal building)
