= Kip-Beekman-Heermance Site =

- Kip-Beekman-Heermance Site (A027-16-0223)
- U.S. National Register of Historic Places
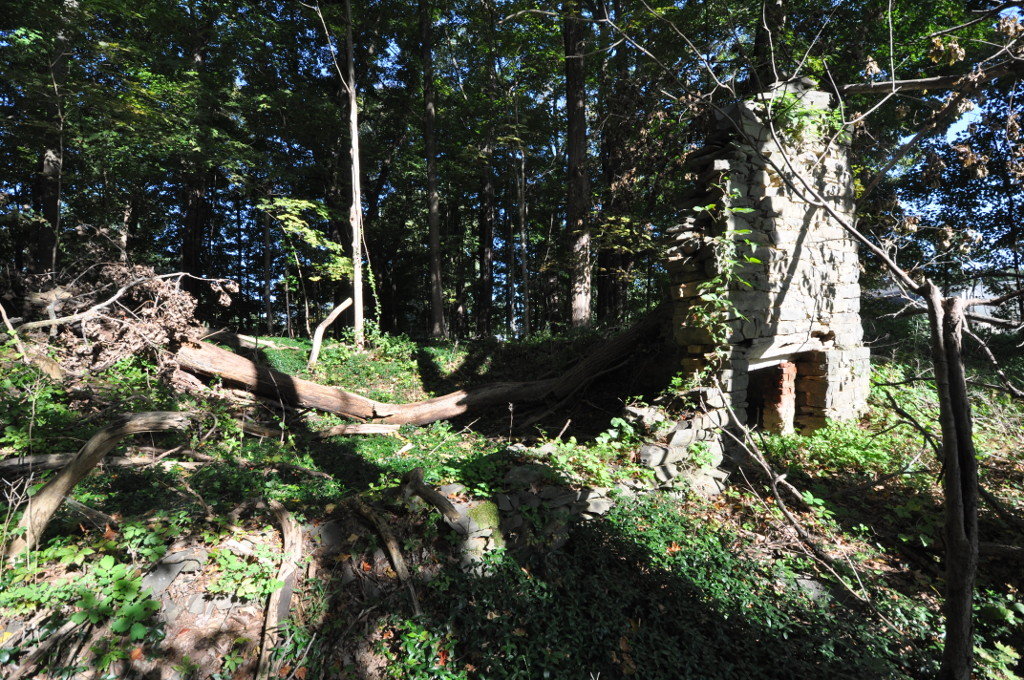

- Location within New York Location within the United States
- Location: Rhinecliff, New York
- Coordinates: 41°55′34″N 73°56′45″W
- Area: 1 acre (0.40 ha)
- Built: 1700
- MPS: Rhinebeck Town MRA
- NRHP reference No.: 89000260
- Added to NRHP: April 19, 1989

Kip-Beekman-Heermance Site is a historic archaeological site located at Rhinebeck, Dutchess County, New York.

== History ==
The site includes the ruins of the Kip-Beekman-Heermance House built 1700 by Hendrick Kip, Patentee. It was also the home of Col. Henry Beekman Jr. later of his Grandson Col. Henry Brockholst Livingston (1757 - 1823). It was destroyed by fire in the early 20th century. The house was of such local prominence that Franklin Delano Roosevelt based the design of the Rhinebeck Post Office on the manor house and used the ruins for the stone construction of the building.

It was added to the National Register of Historic Places in 1989. The site, on County Road 85, is marked by a historic marker.
