= Lower Main Street Historic District =

Historic district in New York, United States

- U.S. National Register of Historic Places
- U.S. Historic district
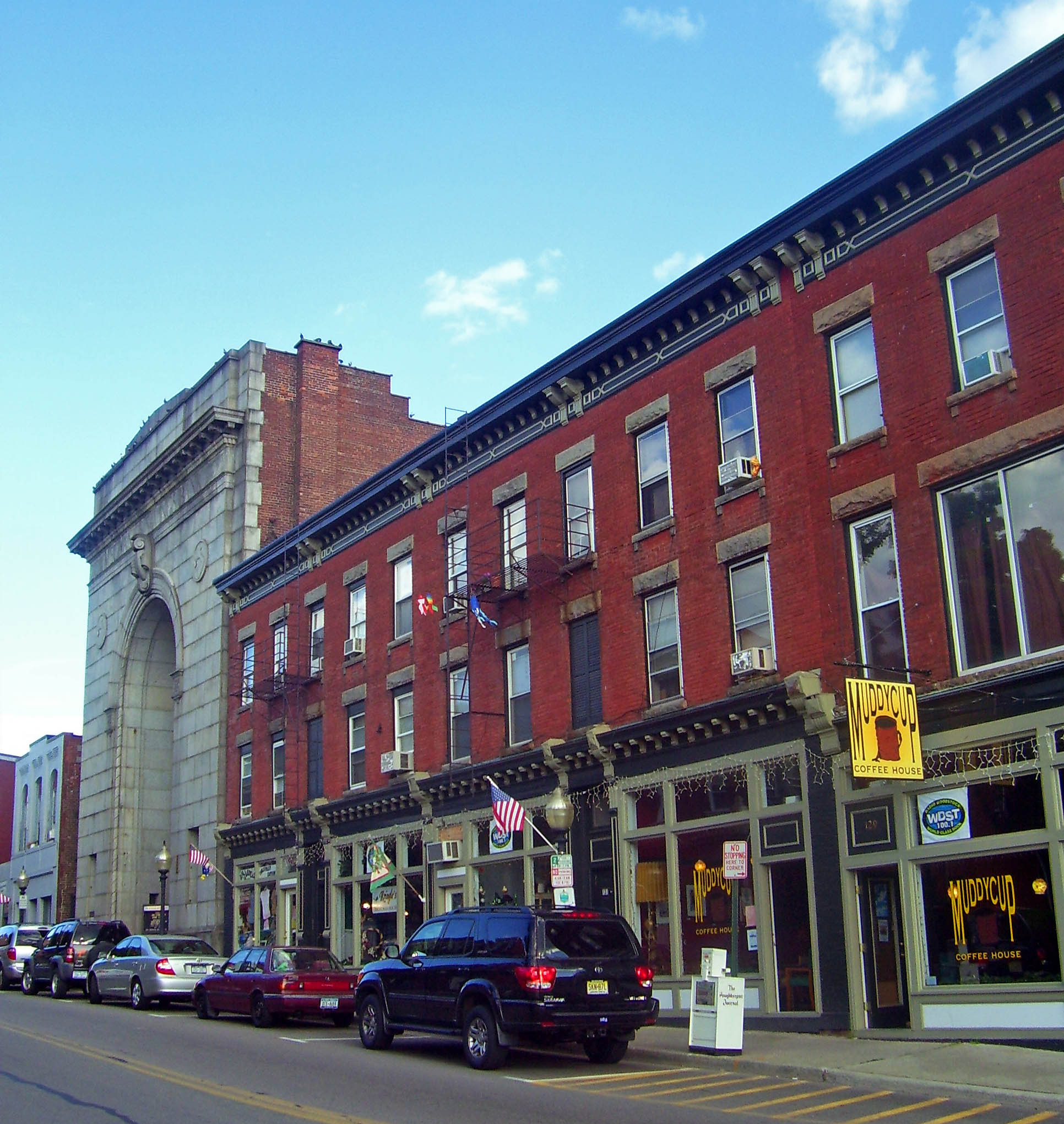
- The south side of Lower Main Street, 2007

- Location within New York Location within the United States
- Location: Beacon, NY
- Coordinates: 41°30′30″N 73°58′37″W
- Area: 50 acres (20 ha)
- Built: 1850-1950
- Architectural style: Italianate
- NRHP reference No.: 87002198
- Added to NRHP: 1987

The Lower Main Street Historic District is a historic district comprising the first several blocks of Main Street (NY 52 Business) in Beacon, east of its intersection with South Street, the end of its concurrency with NY 9D. The southeast end is at Teller Avenue. The District covers about 50 acres (20 ha.) and includes 32 buildings, most of them in the late 19th-century Italianate style.

Many of these buildings have been extensively renovated and are now used for businesses such as boutiques and art galleries. The Beacon Institute for Rivers and Estuaries currently has its home in one of the buildings.

The District was added to the National Register of Historic Places in 1987.

== Contributing properties ==
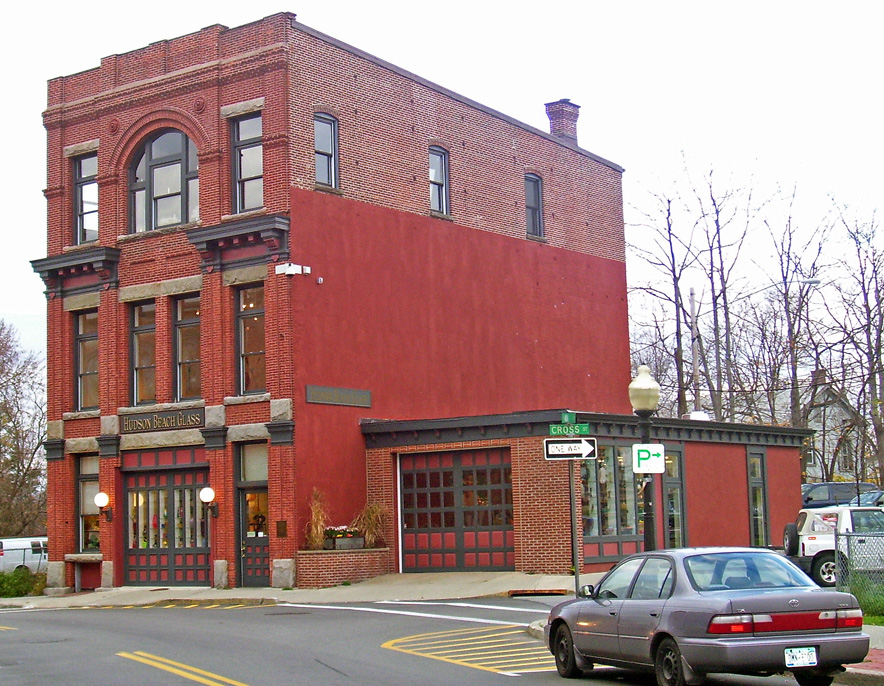
Beacon Firehouse -1

The former Lewis Tompkins Hose Company No. 1 Firehouse, was the first built in what later became the city of Beacon, New York. Designed by Schuyler Tillman and Benjamin Hall in a Second Empire style, it was completed in 1893. It is located at 140 Main Street, a block away from NY 9D, and was later renovated as an art glass studio. On December 6, 2004, it was listed on the National Register of Historic in its own right.

== See also ==
- National Register of Historic Places listings in Dutchess County, New York
