= Henry Delamater House =

Historic house in New York, United States

- U.S. National Register of Historic Places
- U.S. Historic district – Contributing property
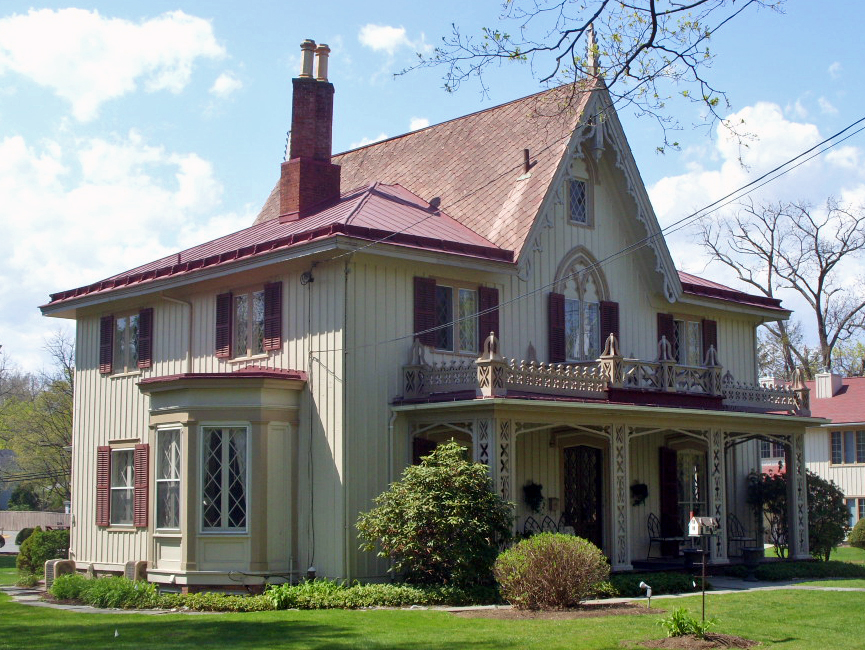
- Delamater Inn East elevation and south profile, 2009

- Location within New York Location within the United States
- Location: 44 Montgomery St., Rhinebeck, New York
- Coordinates: 41°55′42.11″N 73°54′48.83″W
- Area: 2.7 acres (1.1 ha)
- Built: 1844
- Architect: Davis, Alexander Jackson
- Architectural style: Gothic Revival
- Website: Delamater House webpage Delamater Inn webpage
- Part of: Rhinebeck Village Historic District (ID79001578)
- MPS: Rhinebeck Town MRA
- NRHP reference No.: 73001185
- Added to NRHP: May 7, 1973

The Henry Delamater House is a historic house located at 44 Montgomery Street (US 9) in Rhinebeck, Dutchess County, New York. The house was "built in 1844 as the home of Henry Delamater, founding president of the First National Bank of Rhinebeck."

Today, the Delamater House serves as the main building of the Delamater Inn, which also includes "seven guest houses clustered around a courtyard," in connection with the nearby Beekman Arms Inn on Mill Street, which shares common ownership. The Delamater House itself offers seven guest rooms and a living room.

== Description and history ==
It was designed by architect Alexander Jackson Davis and built in 1844. It is a two-story, Gothic Revival style wood frame dwelling sheathed in board and batten siding. It has a hipped roof intersected by a front gable roof and features an ornamental verandah and ornamental pointed arch with two lancet arches. Also on the property is a contributing carriage house.

It was listed in the National Register of Historic Places on May 7, 1973. It is also a contributing property in the Rhinebeck Village Historic District.

Following his 1958 purchase of the Beekman Arms Inn, Charles LaForge Jr. bought the Delamater House in 1979 with business partner Timothy Toronto and renovated the property, constructing a "Courtyard Complex." George Banta Sr. purchased both the Beekman Arms and Delamater Inn from LaForge in 2002.
