= United States Post Office (Rhinebeck, New York) =

- U.S. Post Office
- U.S. National Register of Historic Places
- U.S. Historic district – Contributing property
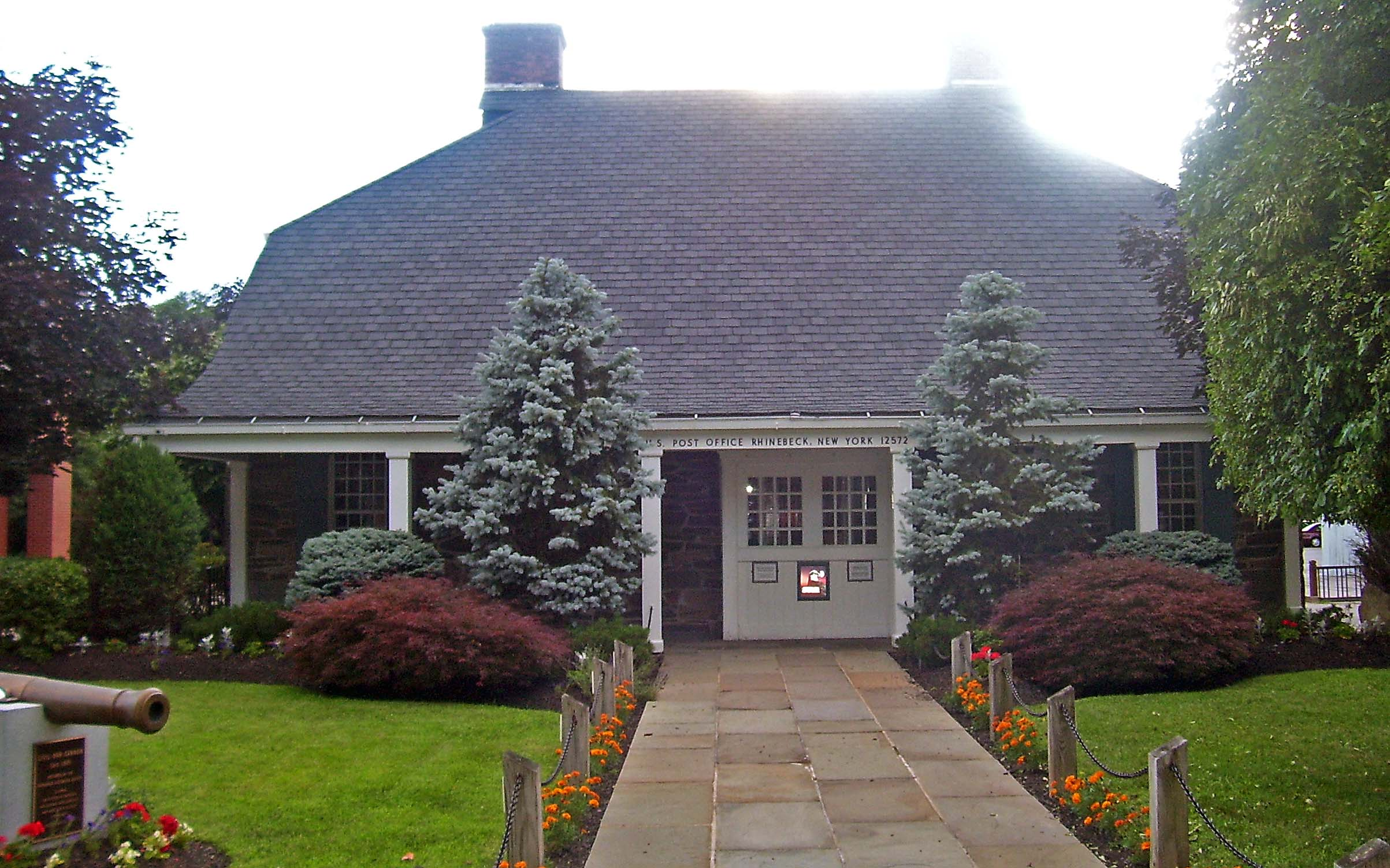
- East elevation, 2007

- Location within New York Location within the United States
- Location: 6383 Mill St. Rhinebeck, NY
- Nearest city: Kingston
- Coordinates: 41°55′35″N 73°54′48″W
- Area: less than one acre
- Built: 1940
- Architect: Olin Dows, R. Stanley-Brown
- Architectural style: Colonial Revival
- Part of: Rhinebeck Village Historic District
- MPS: U.S. Post Offices in New York State, 1858-1943, TR
- NRHP reference No.: 88002419
- Added to NRHP: May 11, 1989

The U.S. Post Office in Rhinebeck, New York serves the 12572 ZIP Code. It is located on Mill Street (US 9) just south of the intersection with NY 308 at the center of the village.

It is a stone Colonial Revival structure built in 1940, during the New Deal. President Franklin Delano Roosevelt, a native of nearby Hyde Park, took a personal interest in its design, as he did with other post offices in Dutchess County built during his administration. He chose a ruined historic house, whose stones were used in the post office, as its model, and spoke at its dedication. In 1989 it was listed on the National Register of Historic Places. It is also a contributing property to the Rhinebeck Village Historic District.

== Building ==
The post office is a one-and-a-half-story fieldstone building with a low-sloping jerkin roof shingled in asbestos treated to look like wood. It flares out over a porch that runs the length of the eastern (front) elevation. Two large brick chimneys rise from the ends, both next to a small dormer window on the north and south faces.

The porch is wooden, supported by square piers, with a bluestone floor. At either end of the facade are the large cornerstones, also of bluestone. One is a standard datestone giving the names of the participants in the ceremony; the other says that the building is a replica of the 1700 Beekman House and that stones from the ruins of that house were used to build the post office. The main entrance, a simulated Dutch door, is within a wooden vestibule.

Inside, the lobby stretches across the front of the building. It is floored in random-width pegged oak. Pine wainscoting rises to a ceiling with hand-hewn exposed beams. Two display cases contain other remnants of the Beekman House. Above the wainscot are murals depicting scenes from local history, including the post office's groundbreaking ceremony. Two original oak counters remain. The postmaster's office to the north is paneled.

A long wing projects to the west, where the parking lot, accessed from nearby West Market Street, is located. Two original cast iron lamps are located along the sidewalk leading to the entrance from Mill Street.

== History ==
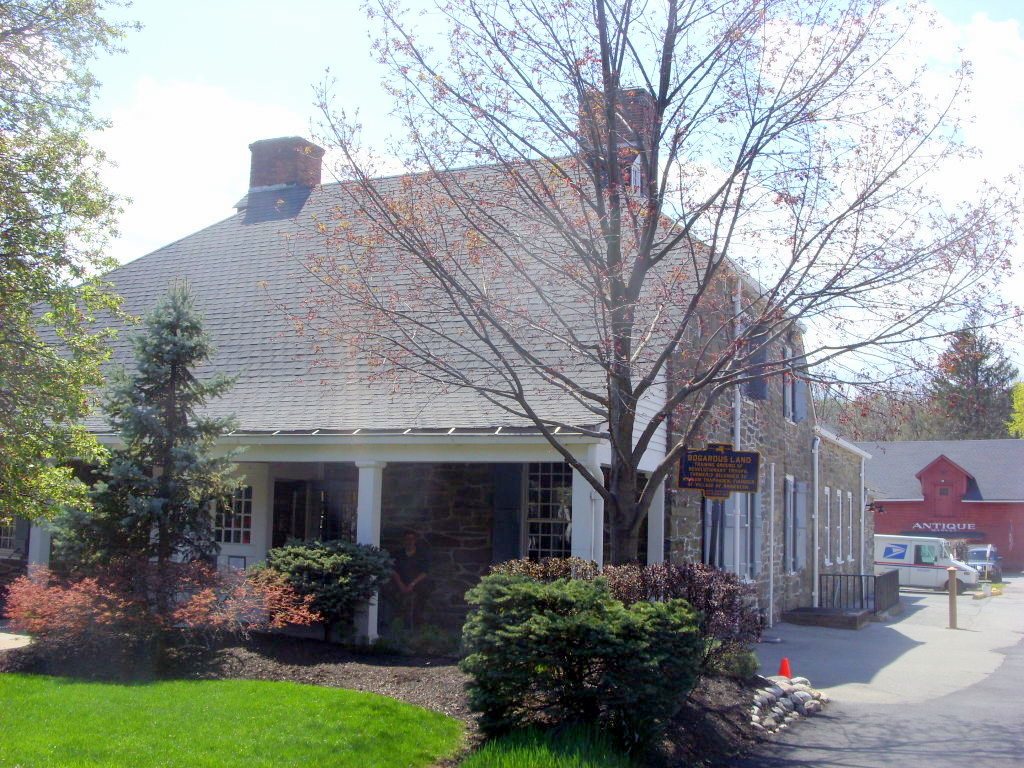
Rhinebeck Post Office, April 2009

Even before he became governor of New York State in 1928, Roosevelt had taken a keen interest in reviving the use of fieldstone in the Hudson Valley, the material favored by many early Dutch settlers of the region, including his own ancestors. He had made sure, in the mid-1920s, that Hyde Park's library, built in his father's memory, used stone. As president he had ensured that new post offices in Beacon and Poughkeepsie used the material. The latter had also emulated an earlier building, Dutchess County's 1809 courthouse.

After Poughkeepsie's post office was completed and opened, Postmaster General James Farley asked Roosevelt if he wanted to start work on a new post office in Hyde Park, a project he had wanted to undertake. Congress had authorized both post offices in 1937. Since Rhinebeck was a larger community with a more pressing need for a new post office, the president told Farley to give it priority first. The town helped matters along by selling the site of their 1872 town hall to the federal government for $16,000 ($366,000 in contemporary dollars).

Roosevelt insisted that the new post office be built in the style of Kipsbergen, or the Beekman House, a nearby home (destroyed by fire in the early 20th century) where some of his ancestors had lived, which features a similarly steep-sloped front roof. There was some opposition to this from local historians since they did not think the style typical of Dutch homes in the region, but eventually it was built as Roosevelt wished.

Rudolph Stanley-Brown, a former Treasury Department architect and grandson of President James A. Garfield, then in private practice, handled the details of the design. Many of Kipsbergen's stones remained, and these were used in the post office's construction. Ultimately, 90% of the front wall was built of its stones. Local artist Olin Dows, head of the Treasury Relief Art Project, later painted a mural inside of scenes from Rhinebeck's history.

Both Farley and Treasury Secretary Henry Morgenthau Jr. were present at the dedication ceremony on May 1, 1939, along with the crown prince and princess of Denmark and Iceland, who were touring the U.S. at the time. All of them ceremonially laid the first mortar on the cornerstone.

The president spoke at length about the building and its design:

We are seeking to follow the type of architecture which is good in the sense that it does not of necessity follow the whims of the moment but seeks an artistry that ought to be good, as far as we can tell, for all time to come. And we are trying to adapt the design to the historical background of the locality and to use, insofar as possible, the materials which are indigenous to the locality itself. Hence, fieldstone for Dutchess County. Hence, the efforts during the past few years in Federal buildings in the Hudson River Valley to use fieldstone and to copy the early Dutch architecture which was so essentially sound besides being very attractive to the eye.

Three of the six stone post offices in the region whose design Roosevelt oversaw were based on historic buildings no longer extant at the time of their construction. Of those three, Rhinebeck's most closely replicates its original, and is the only one with an exhibit inside of some other remnants of that model. Its porch and lobby mimic a typical 18th-century colonial home's finishing. The paneling in the postmaster's office imitates a parlor of that era.

A few changes have been made to the building over time, such as the installation of modern light fixtures in the lobby and aluminum-muntined storm windows, but it has otherwise remained largely intact. In 1989 the building was added to the National Register of Historic Places, a contributing property to the existing Rhinebeck Village Historic District.
