= John DeLamater =

American sociologist and sexologist (1940–2017)

- Born: October 12, 1940; San Diego, California, U.S.
- Died: December 13, 2017 (aged 77)
- Education: University of Michigan
- Occupations: Sociologist, sexologist
- Children: 3
- Scientific career
- Fields: Sociology, sexology

John Delos DeLamater (October 12, 1940 – December 13, 2017) was an American sociologist and sexologist who taught at the University of Wisconsin–Madison, where he was the Conway-Bascom Professor Emeritus in the Department of Sociology.

He was born to Clarence Delos DeLamater and Ethel Anna Hunter, on October 12, 1940, in San Diego, California. DeLamater earned a doctorate in social psychology from the University of Michigan in 1969, and joined the faculty of the University of Wisconsin–Madison the same year. DeLamater was named a fellow of the Society for the Scientific Study of Sexuality, received the Alfred E. Kinsey award for sex research, and served as editor of the Journal of Sex Research. He had three children. He donated two PCC streetcars to the City of Kenosha, Wisconsin, which operate on their trolley line and are dedicated to his memory.
