= Gerald Foster (painter) =

American painter

- Born: September 30, 1900; Westfield, New Jersey, United States
- Died: June 13, 1987 (aged 86); Orangeburg, South Carolina, United States
- Occupation: Painter

Gerald Foster (September 30, 1900 – June 13, 1987) was an American painter. His work was part of the painting event in the art competition at the 1932 Summer Olympics.
