= Poughkeepsie Journal Building =

- U.S. National Register of Historic Places
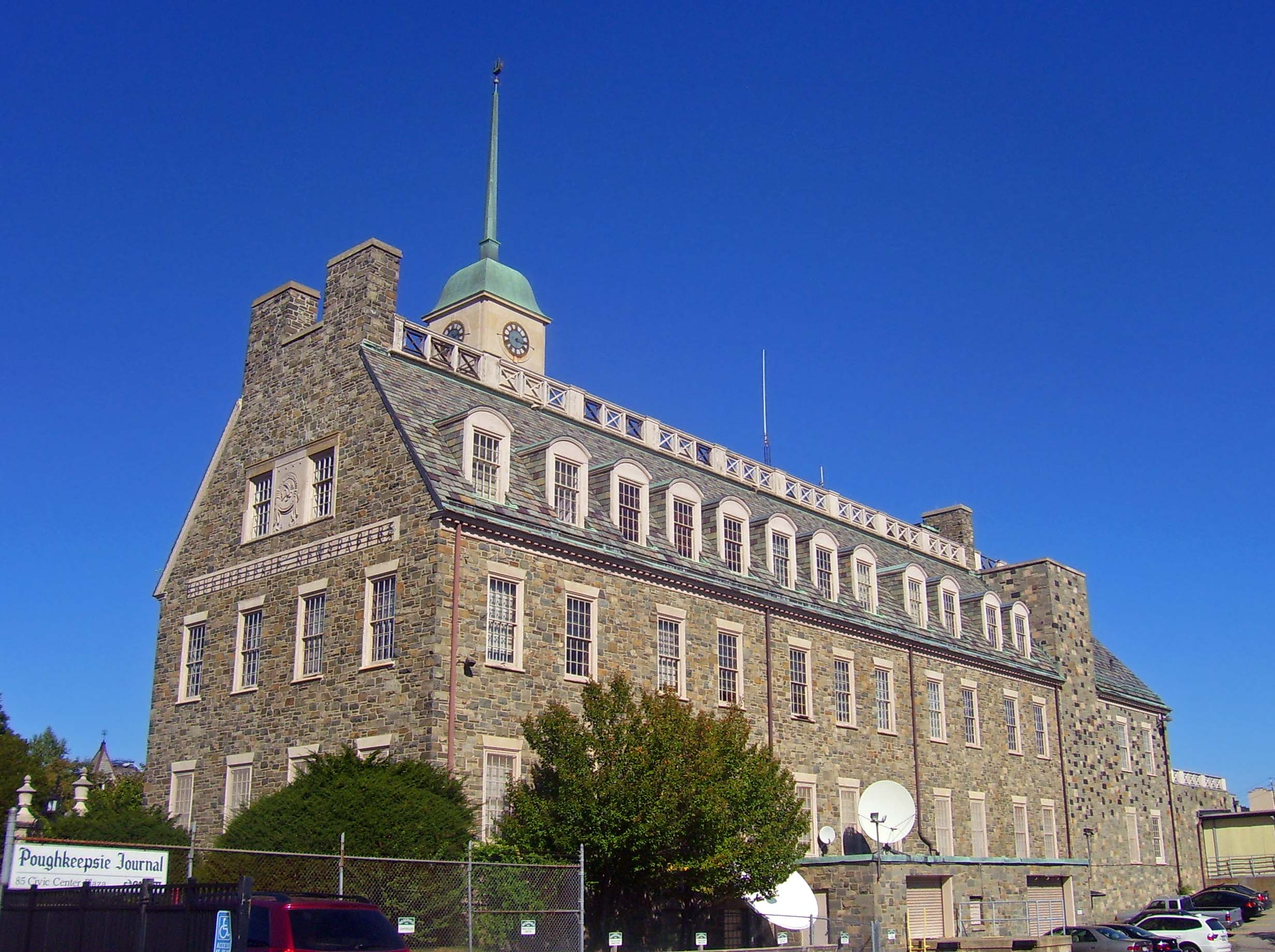
- Rear view of building in 2007

- Location within New York Location within the United States
- Location: Civic Center Plaza, Poughkeepsie, New York
- Coordinates: 41°42′18″N 73°55′42″W
- Area: less than one acre
- Built: 1941
- Architect: Eugene T. Benham; Charles J. Cooke
- Architectural style: Colonial Revival
- MPS: Poughkeepsie MRA
- NRHP reference No.: 82005069
- Added to NRHP: November 26, 1982

The Poughkeepsie Journal Building was the main office of that newspaper, in the city of Poughkeepsie, New York, United States. It is located at Civic Center Plaza, the north end of Market Street. The newspaper sold the building in 2009 to Page Park Associates and moved out in November 2022.

It was built of fieldstone in a Colonial Revival style in 1941. Architects in the Hudson Valley, and particularly Dutchess County, took inspiration from then-President Franklin D. Roosevelt's efforts to revive its use in the region, following the example of the early Dutch settlers of the area, who built many stone houses for themselves. In particular, the building complements the city's main post office nearby. In 1982 it qualified for addition to the National Register of Historic Places, but it was not listed due to an objection by the owner.
