= Poughkeepsie Journal =

Newspaper in Poughkeepsie, New York

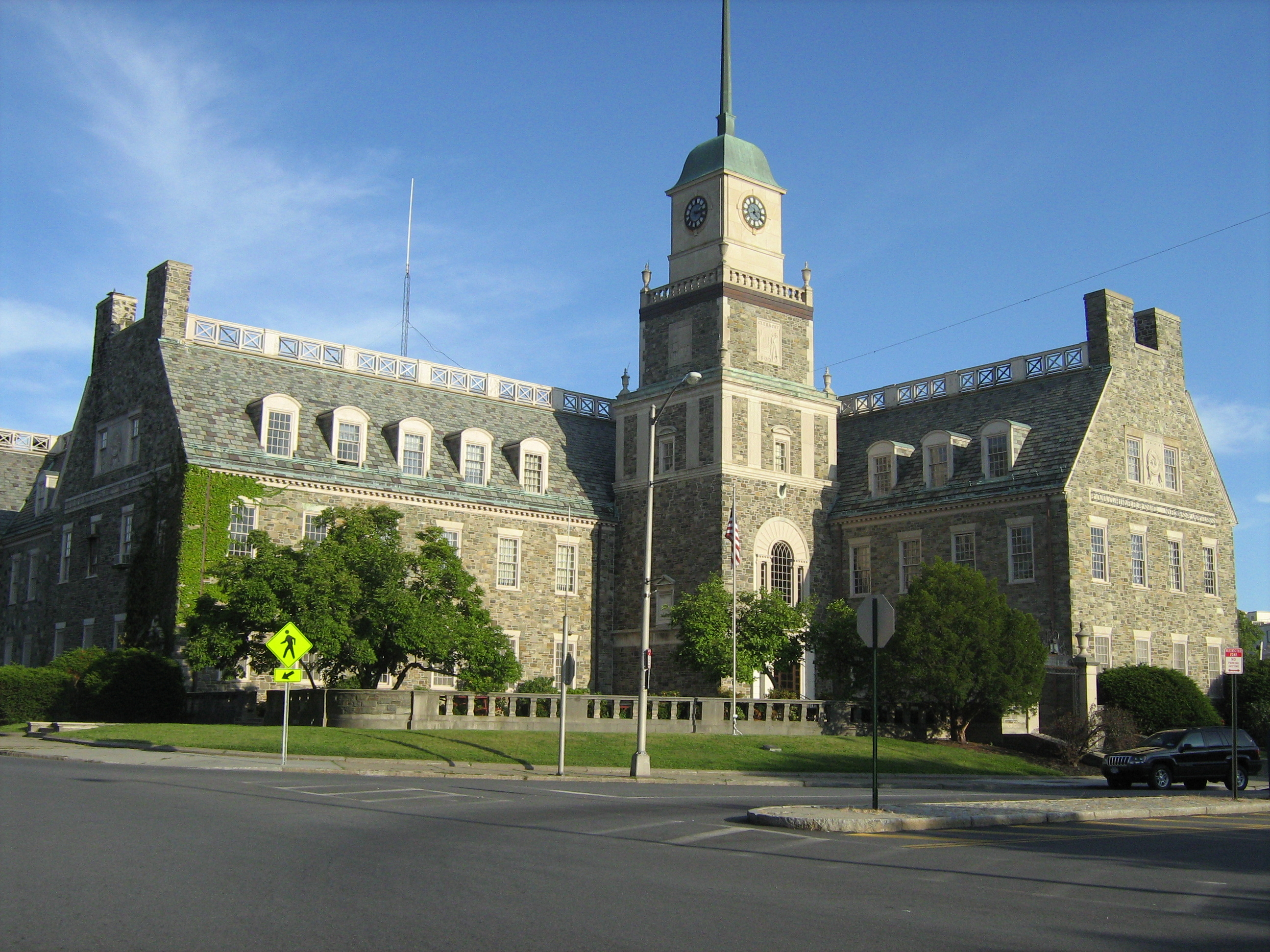
- Historic headquarters in downtown Poughkeepsie
- Type: Daily newspaper
- Format: Broadsheet
- Owner: USA Today Co.
- Publisher: Jim Fogler
- Editor: Stu Shinske
- Founded: 1785; 241 years ago
- Headquarters: 85 Civic Center Plaza; Poughkeepsie 12601
- Circulation: 24,628 Daily (as of 2017)
- Website: poughkeepsiejournal.com

The Poughkeepsie Journal is a newspaper based in Poughkeepsie, New York, and owned by Gannett, which bought the paper in 1977. Founded in 1785 (though not a daily newspaper until 1860), the Journal is the oldest paper in New York state, and is the second-oldest in the nation. The Journal's primary coverage area is Dutchess County, though the entire Mid-Hudson Valley is covered in some form, along with some coverage of points south via the White Plains–based Journal News.

Throughout its existence, the Journal has been a paper of historical significance given the various events in the Poughkeepsie area. For example, in 1788, the editor of the Journal was the official reporter of the ratification of the United States Constitution by New York in that year (the event itself occurring in Poughkeepsie, which was the state capital at the time). The paper also served as a launching point of stories during the Franklin D. Roosevelt administration when the President was at his estate in nearby Hyde Park. In the book My Side of the Mountain, the Journal was mentioned under its name at the time, the Poughkeepsie New Yorker.

The Journal's main office was a fieldstone Colonial Revival building on Civic Center Plaza, the north end of Market Street in downtown Poughkeepsie. It is listed on the National Register of Historic Places.

== Name ==
Though the Journal has been published for over 220 years, it has not published under the Journal nameplate for the whole of its existence. The evolution of the names of the paper is as follows.

- Poughkeepsie Journal (1785–1844)
  - Poughkeepsie Journal and Country Journal (1785–95, summarized version sent to outlying areas)

1840: Poughkeepsie Journal merges with Poughkeepsie Eagle

- Poughkeepsie Journal & Eagle (1844–1850)
- Poughkeepsie Eagle (1850–53)
- Poughkeepsie Weekly Eagle (1854–57)
- Poughkeepsie Eagle (1857–60)
- Poughkeepsie Eagle Weekly (1860)
- Poughkeepsie Daily Eagle (1860–80)
  - Poughkeepsie Eagle Weekly & Sunday Courier (1872–76)

1880: Poughkeepsie Daily Eagle merges with The Poughkeepsie News

- Poughkeepsie Daily Eagle News (1880–1914)
- Poughkeepsie Eagle News (1915–42)
- Poughkeepsie New Yorker (1942–60)

1960: Poughkeepsie New Yorker returns to the "Journal" name to commemorate the paper's 175th anniversary.

- Poughkeepsie Journal (1960–80)
- Poughkeepsie Journal A.M. Edition (1980–82, temporary name after move to mornings)
- Poughkeepsie Journal (1982–present)
