= List of Art Deco architecture in New York (state) =

This is a list of buildings that are examples of the Art Deco architectural style in New York (state), United States.

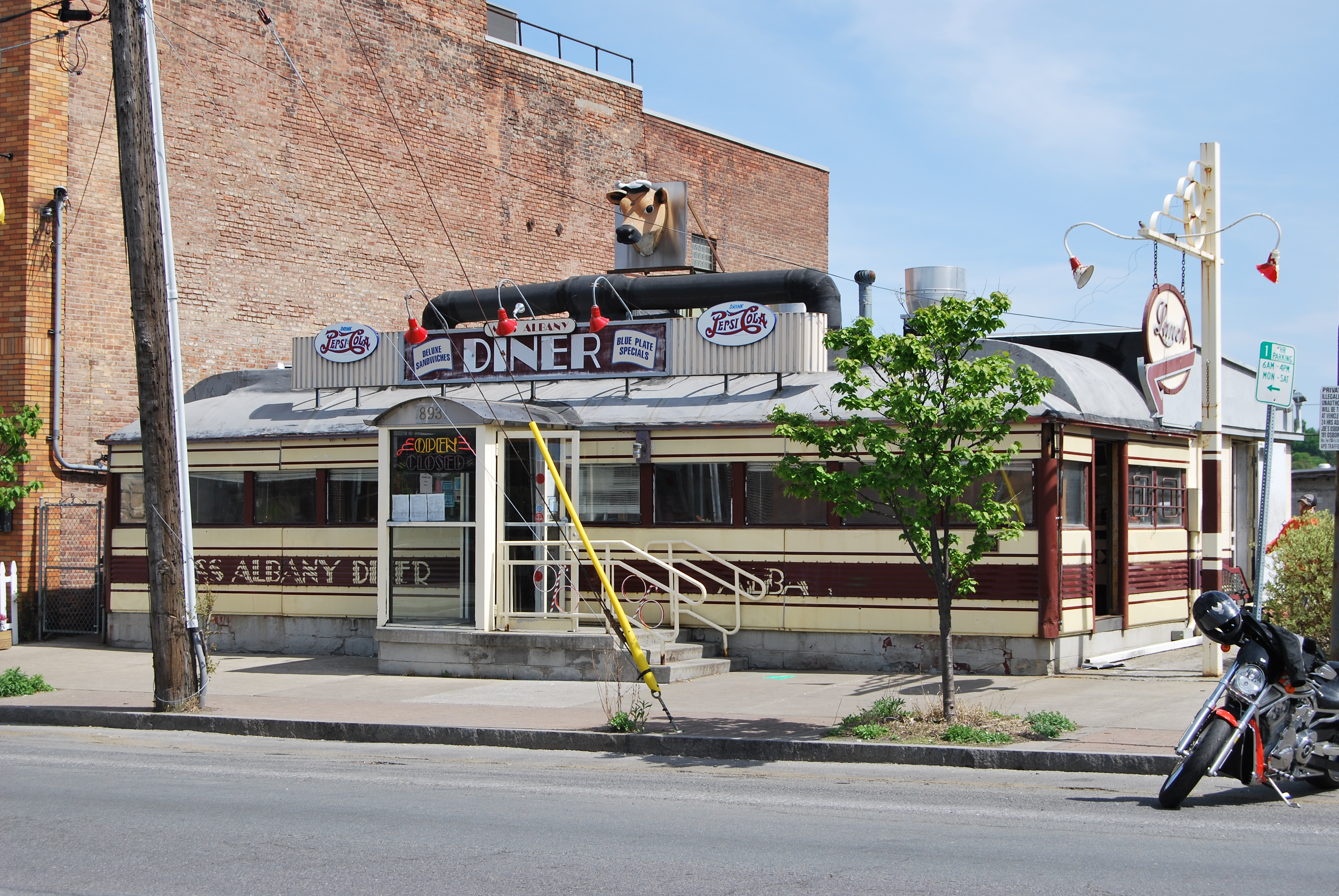
Miss Albany Diner, Albany, New York

== Albany ==
- Alfred E. Smith Building, Albany, 1928
- Home Savings Bank Building, Albany, 1927
- James T. Foley United States Courthouse, Albany, 1930s
- Madison Theater, Albany, 1929
- Miss Albany Diner, Albany, 1941
- Palace Theatre, Albany, 1930
- Philip Livingston Magnet Academy, Albany, 1930s
- Spectrum 8 Theaters (former Delaware Theater), Albany, 1940s
- Trinity United Methodist Church, Albany, 1926
- White Tower Hamburgers, Albany

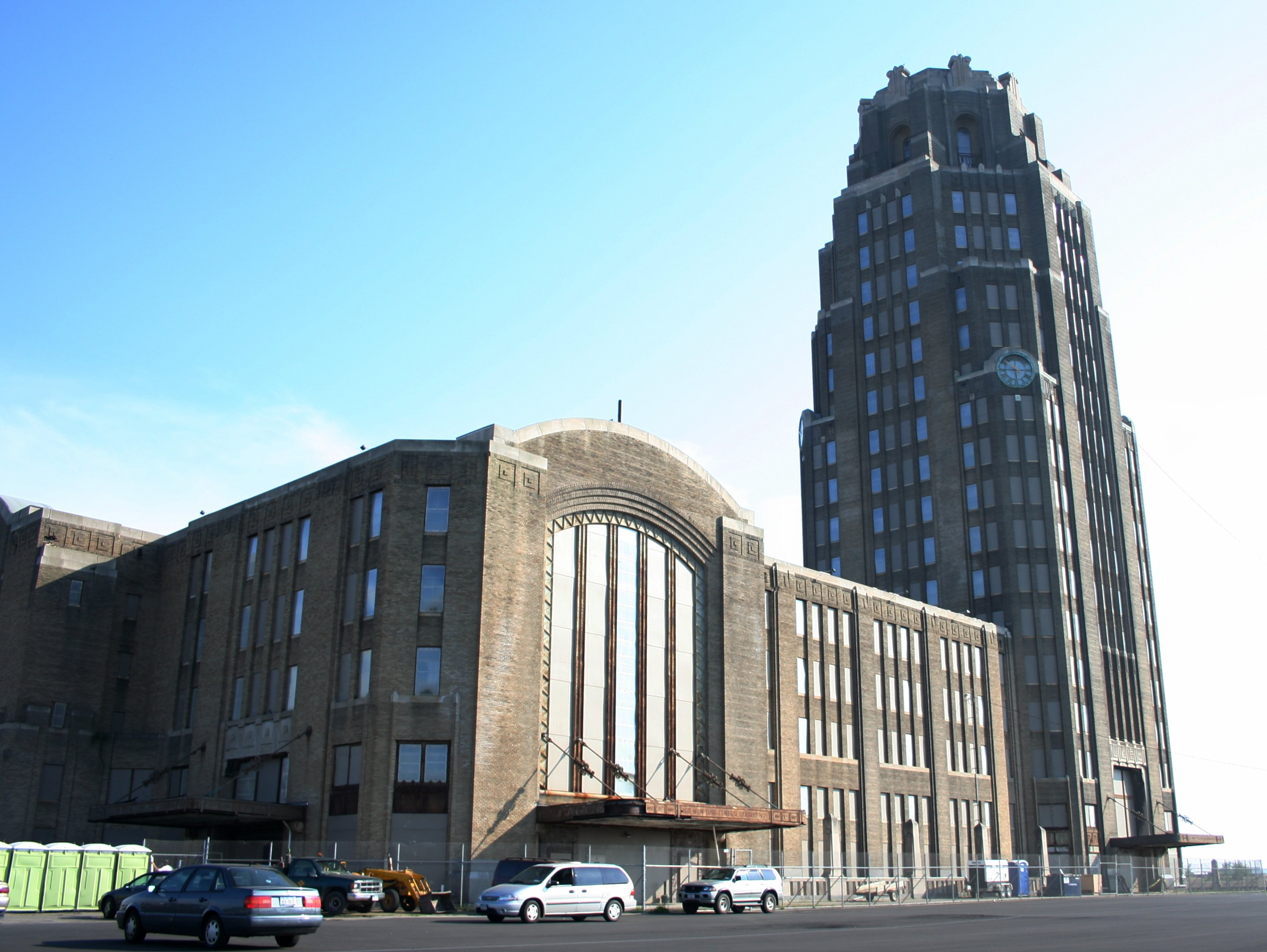
Buffalo Central Terminal, Buffalo, New York

== Buffalo ==
- Buffalo Central Terminal, Buffalo, 1929
- Buffalo City Hall, Buffalo, 1931
- Buffalo Design Collaborative Building, Buffalo, 1930
- Buffalo Fire Department Headquarters, Buffalo, 1931
- Electric Tower, Buffalo, 1901, 1923–28
- Hotel Lafayette, Buffalo, 1926
- Kary Building, Buffalo, 1938
- Kensington High School, Buffalo, 1937
- Tonawanda Municipal Building, Kenmore, 1936

== Liberty ==
- Munson Diner, Liberty, 1945
- Town and Country Building, Liberty, 1890, 1950
- Yaun Co., Inc. Building, Liberty

== New York City ==
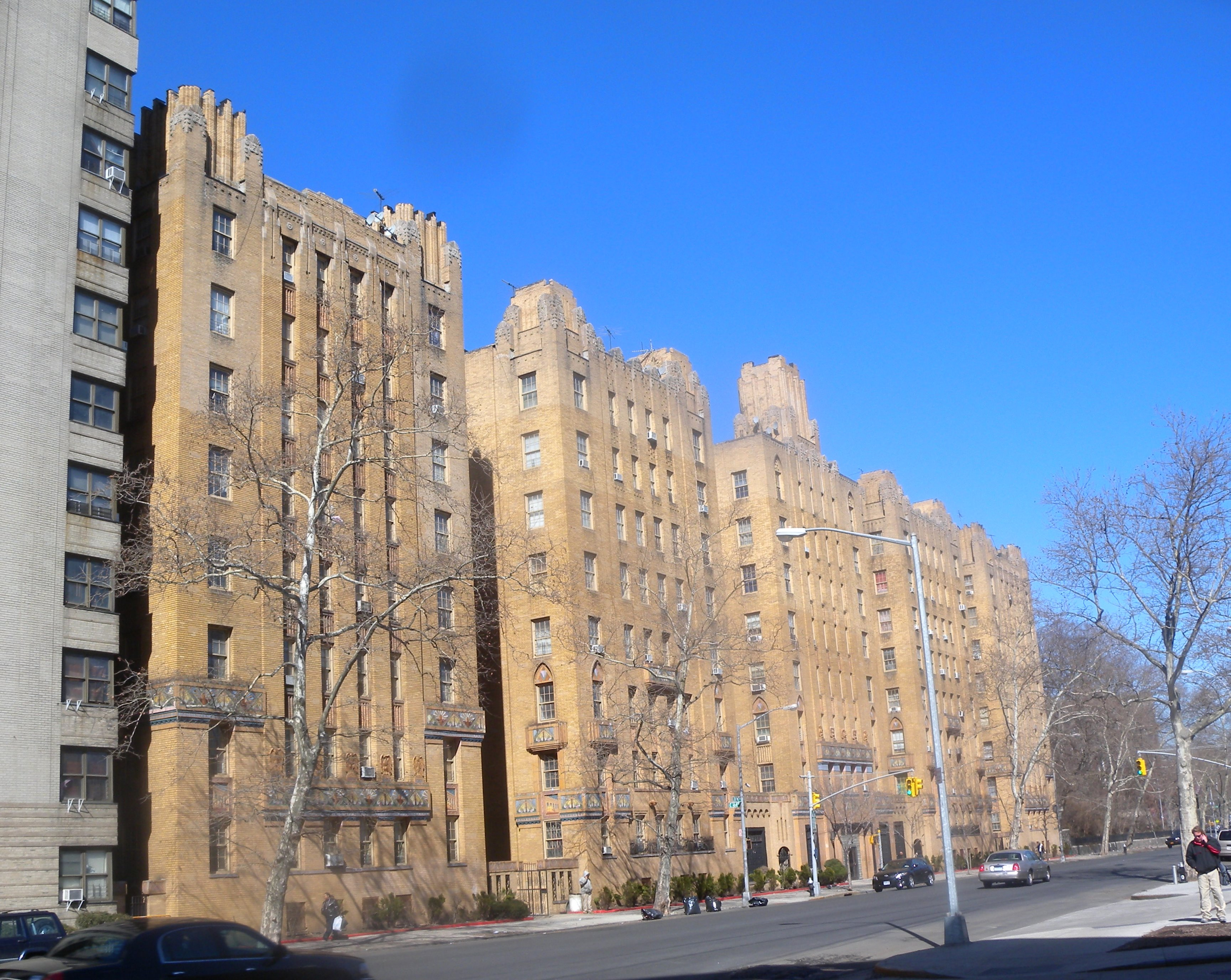
Park Plaza Apartments, The Bronx, New York City, New York

=== The Bronx ===
- 1100 Grand Concourse, The Bronx, 1928
- Beacon Apartments, The Bronx, 1937
- Bronx County Courthouse, The Bronx, 1931
- Bronx Park Medical Pavilion, The Bronx, 1928
- Cardinal Hayes Memorial High School, The Bronx, 1941
- Community School for Social Justice, The Bronx, 1955
- Concourse Yard Entry Buildings and Substation, Jerome Park, The Bronx, 1933
- Crotona Play Center, The Bronx, 1936
- Fish Building, The Bronx, 1937
- Grand Concourse Buildings, The Bronx, 1935–1941
- Herman Ridder Junior High School, The Bronx, 1931
- Hull Manor Apartments, The Bronx, 1936
- Jerome Park Reservoir, North Bronx, 1906
- Noonan Plaza Apartments, The Bronx, 1931
- Orchard Beach Bathhouse and Promenade, The Bronx, 1937
- Park Plaza Apartments, The Bronx, 1931
- Rainey Memorial Gates, The Bronx, 1934
- Riva Apartments, The Bronx, 1931
- Samuel Gompers High School, The Bronx, 1932
- Town Towers, The Bronx, 1931
- Tremont Towers, The Bronx, 1936
- Van Cortlandt Park Stadium, The Bronx, 1939
- Wagner Building, The Bronx, 1931

=== Brooklyn ===
- A. I. Namm & Son Department Store, Downtown Brooklyn, Brooklyn, 1924–1925 and 1928–1929
- BellTel Lofts (former New York Telephone Company), Downtown Brooklyn, Brooklyn, 1930
- Betsy Head Memorial Pool, Brownsville, Brooklyn, 1940
- Brighton Beach Apartments and Garden Apartments, Brooklyn, 1934
- Brooklyn Printing Plant, New York Times, Brooklyn, 1929
- Church of the Immaculate Heart of Mary, Windsor Terrace, Brooklyn, 1934
- Coney Island Fire Station Pumping Station, Coney Island, Brooklyn, 1938
- Congregation Beth Elohim, Park Slope, Brooklyn, 1929
- Cranlyn Apartments, Downtown, Brooklyn, Brooklyn, 1931
- Kingsway Jewish Center, Midwood, Brooklyn, 1951 and 1957
- Manhattan Beach Jewish Center, Manhattan Beach, Brooklyn, 1952
- McCarren Park Pool, Brooklyn, 1936
- Montague–Court Building, Downtown Brooklyn, Brooklyn, 1927
- National Title Guaranty Building, Brooklyn, 1930
- Nostrand Theatre (now a gym), Brooklyn, 1938
- Sears & Roebuck Company, Brooklyn, 1932
- Sol Goldman Recreation Center, Brooklyn, 1936
- Village Diner, Red Hook, Brooklyn, 1951
- Williamsburgh Savings Bank Tower, Brooklyn, 1929

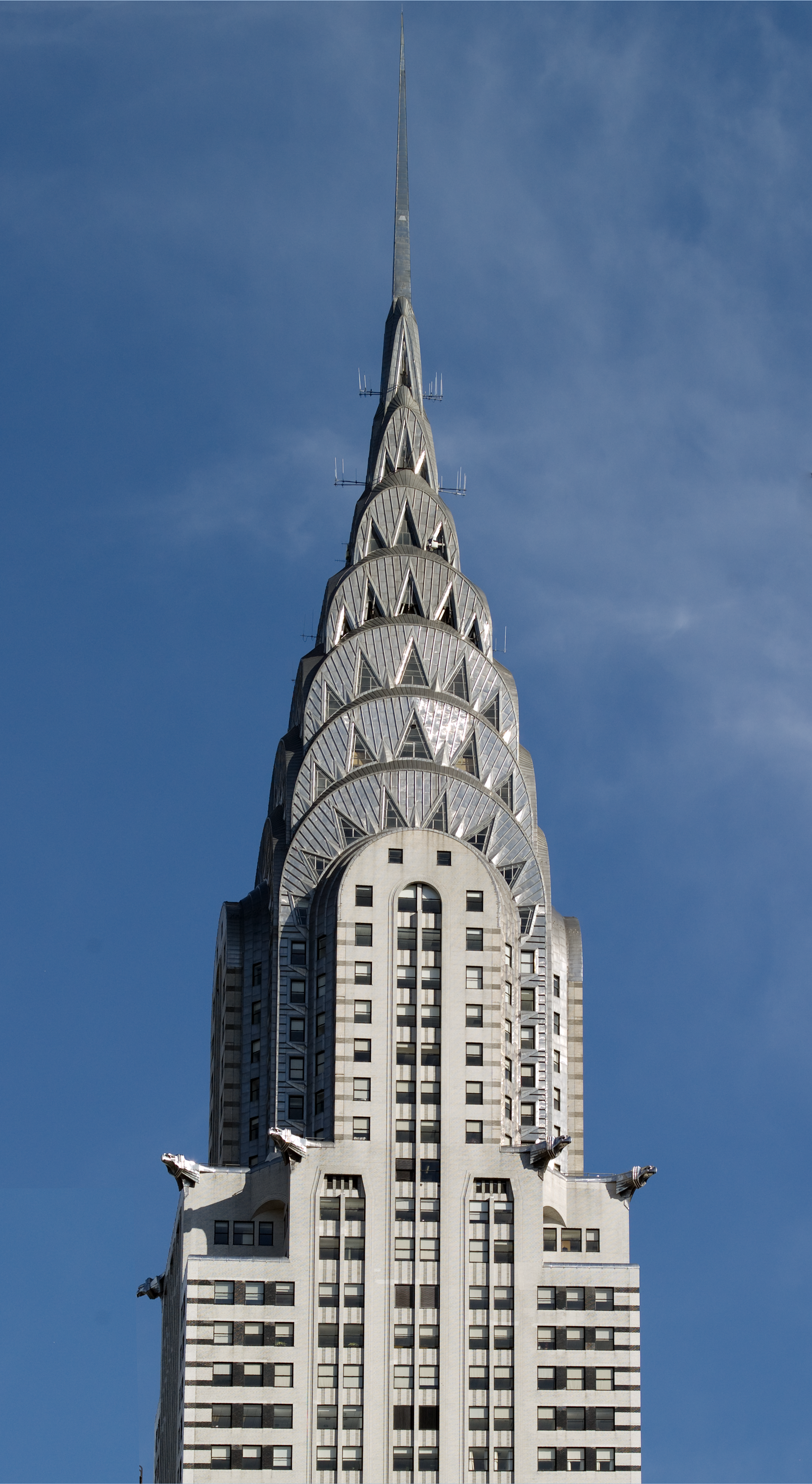
Chrysler Building, Manhattan, New York City, New York

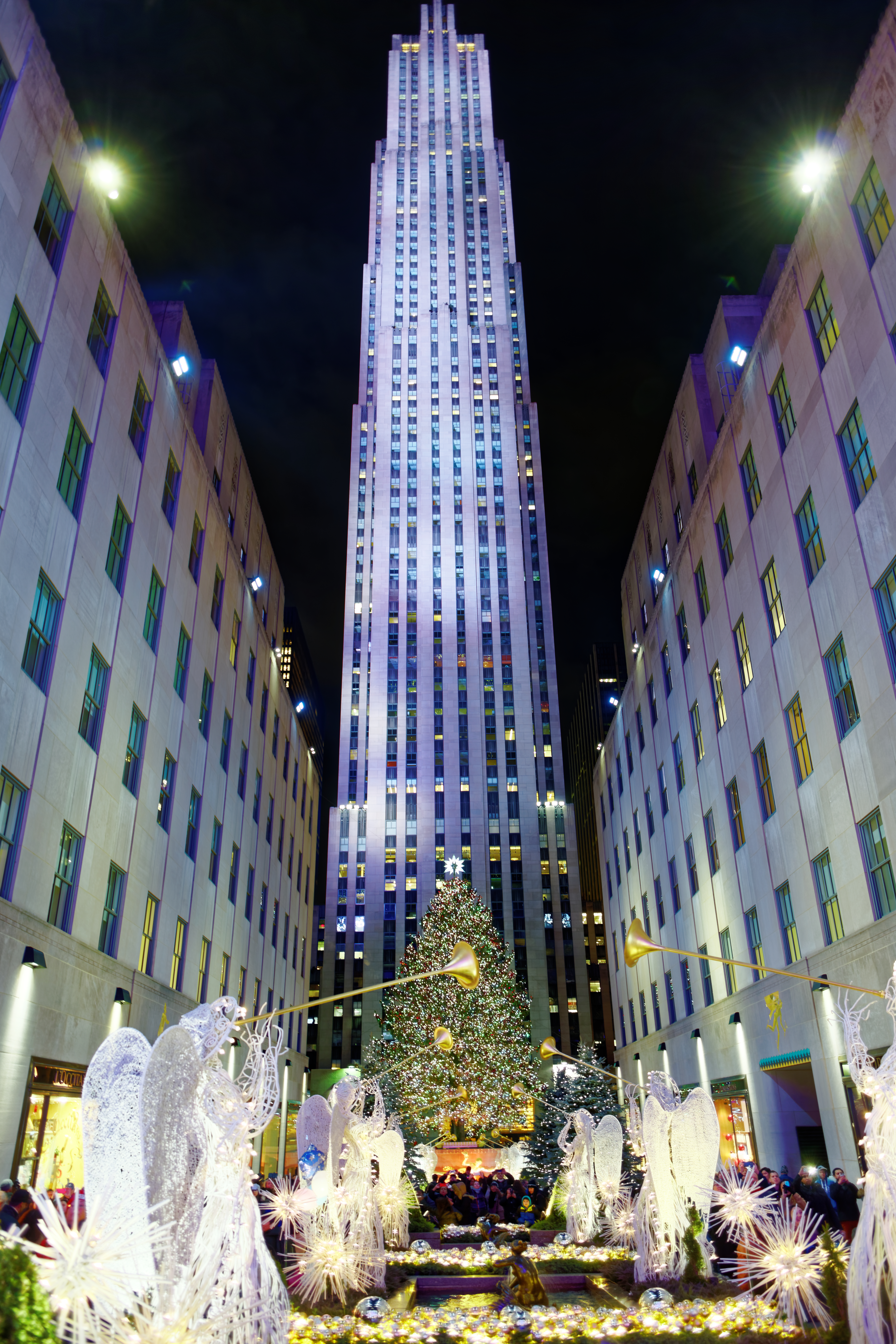
Rockefeller Center, Manhattan, New York City, New York

=== Manhattan ===
- 1 Wall Street, Manhattan, 1931
- 2 Horatio Street, Manhattan, 1931
- 2 Park Avenue, Midtown Manhattan, Manhattan, 1928
- 3 East 84th Street, Upper East Side, Manhattan, 1928
- 10 East 40th Street, Manhattan, 1929
- 14 Wall Street, Manhattan, 1912 and 1933
- 15 Central Park West, Manhattan, 2008
- 19 East 72nd, Upper East Side, Manhattan, 1937
- 20 East End Avenue, Manhattan, 2016
- 20 Exchange Place, Financial District, Manhattan, 1931
- 20th Century Fox Building, Midtown West, Manhattan, 1930
- 21 West Street, Financial District, Manhattan, 1931
- 29 Broadway, Manhattan, 1931
- 30 Rockefeller Plaza, Rockefeller Center, Manhattan, 1933
- 32 Avenue of the Americas, Manhattan, 1932
- 40 Wall Street, Manhattan, 1930
- 45 Christopher Street, Manhattan, 1931
- 55 Central Park West, Manhattan, 1929
- 59 West 12th Street, Manhattan, 1931
- 60 Hudson Street, Manhattan, 1930
- 70 Pine Street, Manhattan, 1932
- 88 Greenwich Street, Manhattan, 1930
- 90 Church Street, Manhattan, 1935
- 95 Christopher Street, West Village, Manhattan, 1931
- 111 Eighth Avenue, Chelsea, Manhattan, 1932
- 116 John Street, Manhattan, 1931
- 120 Bennett Avenue, Washington Heights, Manhattan, 1939
- 120 Wall Street, Financial District, Manhattan, 1930
- 130 Cedar Street, Manhattan, 1931
- 155–165 West 20th Street, Chelsea, Manhattan, 1938
- 200 West 86th Street, Upper West Side, Manhattan, 1931
- 240 Central Park South, Columbus Circle, Manhattan, 1940
- 310 East 55th Street, Sutton Place, Manhattan, 1932
- 315 West 36th Street, Midtown Manhattan, Manhattan1926
- 316 Riverside Drive, Upper West Side, Manhattan, 1933
- 330 West 42nd Street, Manhattan, 1931
- 336 Central Park West, Central Park West Historic District, Upper West Side, Manhattan, 1929
- 350 Cabrini Boulevard, Washington Heights, Manhattan, 1930s
- 369th Regiment Armory, Harlem, Manhattan, 1913
- 370 Riverside Drive, Manhattan, 1922
- 386 Fort Washington, Washington Heights, Manhattan, 1930s
- 400 First Avenue, Kips Bay, Manhattan, 1931
- 411 West End Avenue, Upper West Side, Manhattan, 1936
- 500 Fifth Avenue, Manhattan, 1931
- 570 Lexington Avenue, Manhattan, 1931
- 745 Fifth Avenue (former Squibb Building), Midtown, Manhattan, 1931
- 834 Fifth Avenue, Manhattan, 1931
- 880 Fifth Avenue, Manhattan, 1948
- 930 Fifth Avenue, Manhattan, 1940
- 960 Fifth Avenue, Manhattan, 1928
- 1501 Broadway, Manhattan 1927
- A. S. Beck Building, Midtown Manhattan, Manhattan
- American Radiator Building, Manhattan, 1924
- American Stock Exchange Building, Manhattan, 1921
- Americas Tower, Manhattan, 1993
- The Ardsley Apartments, Upper West Side, Manhattan, 1931
- Baruch College Administration Building, Midtown Manhattan, Midtown, 1939
- Beaux-Arts Institute of Design, Turtle Bay, Manhattan, 1928
- Beekman Tower, Manhattan, 1928
- Bricken Casino Building, Midtown Manhattan, Manhattan, 1931
- Brill Building, Manhattan, 1931
- Carlyle Hotel, Manhattan, 1930
- Central IND Substation, Midtown Manhattan, Manhattan, 1932
- The Century, Manhattan, 1931
- Chanin Building, Manhattan, 1929
- Chelsea Clearview Cinema, Manhattan
- Chrysler Building, Midtown East, Manhattan, 1931
- Columbia University Medical Center, Upper Manhattan, Manhattan, 1928
- Congregation Beth Elohim, Manhattan, 1929
- Continental Bank Building, Manhattan, 1932
- Daily News Building, Turtle Bay, Manhattan, 1930
- Downtown Athletic Club, Manhattan, 1930
- DuMont Building, Manhattan, 1931
- The El Dorado, Manhattan, 1931
- Empire Diner, Chelsea, Manhattan, 1943
- Empire State Building, Manhattan, 1931
- Film Center Building, Manhattan, 1928
- Fourth Church of Christ, Scientist, Washington Heights, Manhattan, 1932
- Fred F. French Building, Midtown Manhattan, Manhattan, 1927
- Fuller Building, Manhattan, 1929
- General Electric Building, Midtown Manhattan, Manhattan, 1931
- Gramercy House, Stuyvesant Square, Manhattan, 1930
- Gramercy Theatre, Gramercy Park, Manhattan, 1937
- Graybar Building, Midtown Manhattan, Manhattan, 1927
- Greenwich Substation 235, Greenwich Village, Manhattan, 1932
- Harlem Substation 219, Upper Manhattan, Manhattan, 1928
- Hebrew Tabernacle of Washington Heights, Washington Heights, Manhattan
- Horn & Hardart Building, Upper West Side, Manhattan, 1930
- Hotel Paris, Manhattan, 1931
- Ivey Delph Apartments, Hamilton Heights, Manhattan, 1951
- Joan of Arc Junior High School, Upper West Side, Manhattan, 1940
- JW Marriott Essex House, Manhattan, 1931
- Lefcourt Colonial Building, Midtown Manhattan, Manhattan, 1930
- Lescaze House, Manhattan, 1934
- Madison Belmont Building, Midtown Manhattan, Manhattan, 1925
- The Majestic, Manhattan, 1931
- Mark Hellinger Theatre, Midtown Manhattan, Manhattan, 1930
- Master Apartments, Upper West Side, Manhattan, 1929
- Mayo Ballroom, Upper East Side, Manhattan, 1927
- Metro Theater, Manhattan
- Metropolitan Life North Building, Flatiron District, Manhattan, 1928
- Millinery Center Synagogue, Garment District, Manhattan, 1933
- Municipal Asphalt Plant, Upper East Side, Manhattan, 1941
- Nelson Tower, Garment District, Manhattan, 1931
- New York Evening Post Building, Lower Manhattan, Manhattan, 1926
- New York Women's House of Detention, Manhattan, 1932
- The Normandy, Manhattan, 1938
- The Paris Apartments, Upper West Side, Manhattan, 1931
- Radio City Music Hall, Midtown Manhattan, Manhattan, 1932
- Rockefeller Center, Midtown Manhattan, Manhattan, 1930–1939
- The San Remo, Manhattan, 1930
- Sherman Square Studios, Upper West Side, Manhattan, 1929
- Sofia Apartments, Upper West Side, Manhattan, 1930
- Sofia Brothers Warehouse (now a Kent Automatic Parking Garage), Upper West Side, Manhattan, 1930
- St. Luke's Lutheran Church, Theater District, Manhattan, 1923
- Starrett–Lehigh Building, Chelsea, Manhattan, 1931
- Substation 219, Harlem, Manhattan, 1932
- Substation 409, Lower East Side, Manhattan, 1936
- The Tombs, Lower Manhattan, Manhattan, 1939
- The Towne House, Murray Hill, Manhattan, 1930
- United States Post Office (Canal Street Station), Manhattan, 1937
- Verizon Building, Tribeca, Manhattan, 1923–1927
- Waldorf Astoria New York, Midtown Manhattan, Manhattan, 1931
- Wyndham New Yorker Hotel, Garment District, Manhattan, 1930

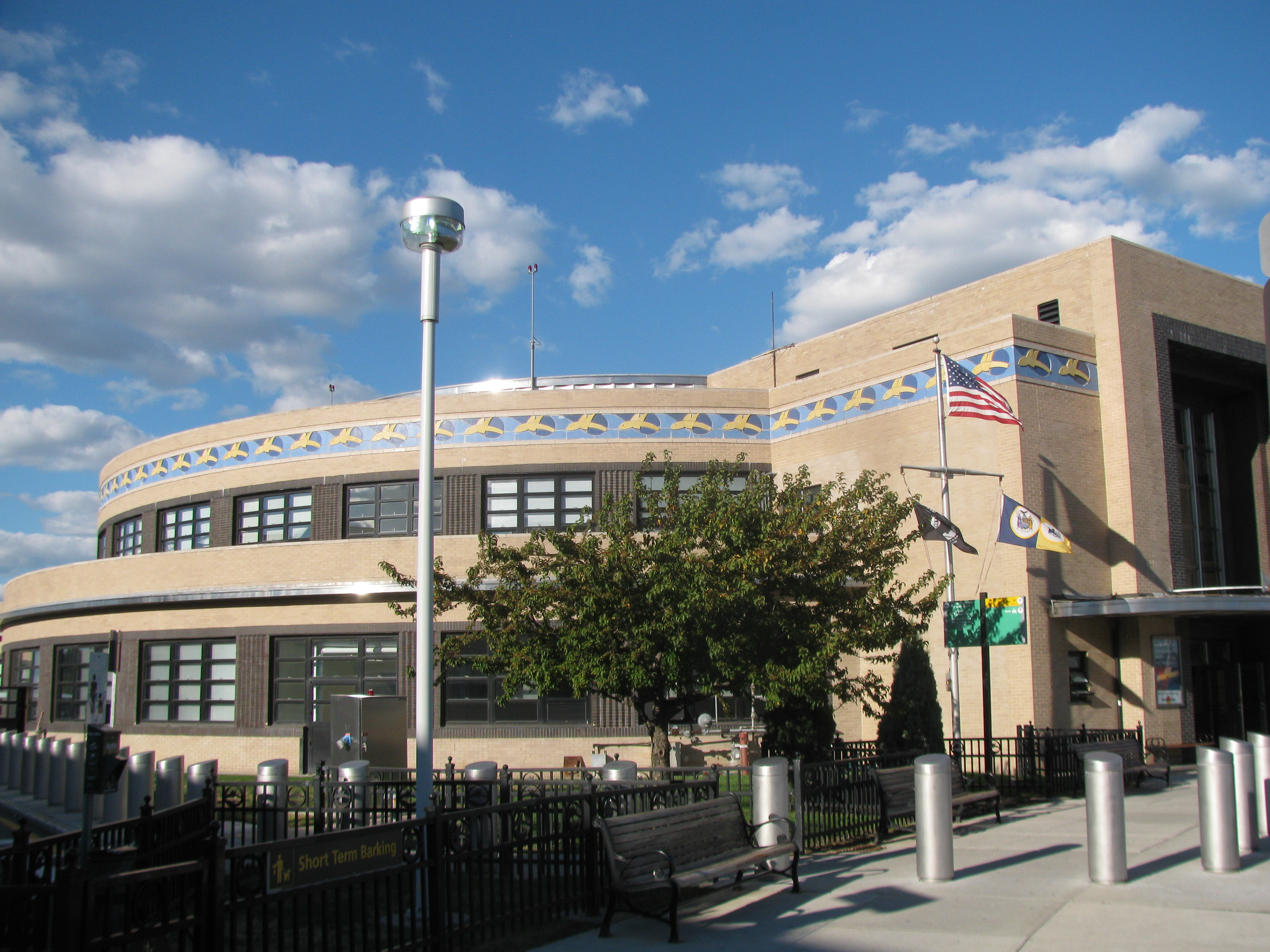
Marine Air Terminal at LaGuardia Airport, Queens, New York City, New York

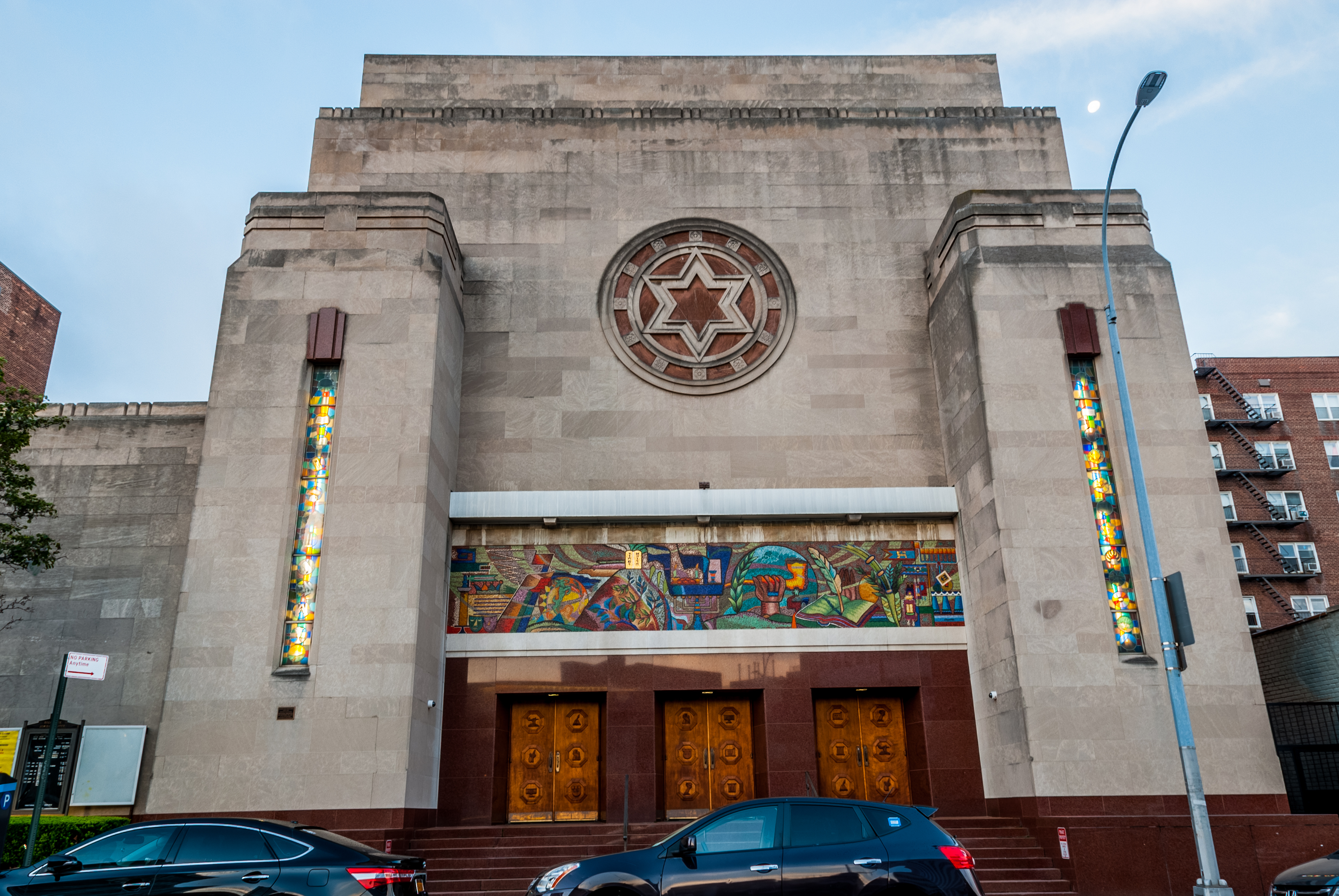
Rego Park Jewish Center, Queens, New York City, New York

=== Queens ===
- 43-25 43rd Street, Queens, 1940
- 63-45 Wetherole Street, Queens, 1936
- 135-18 Northern Boulevard, Queens, 1937
- 166-02 Jamaica Avenue, Queens, 1938
- Astoria Park Pool, Queens, 1936
- Bayside National Bank, Queens, 1938
- Beverly Hall, Queens, 1936
- Blessed Sacrament Church Complex, Queens, 1933–1949
- Bombay Theatre (former Mayfair Theatre), Fresh Meadows, Queens, 1940
- Bowery Bay Wastewater Treatment Plant, Queens, 1939
- Celtic Park Apartments A and B, Queens, 1931
- Church of the Most Precious Blood interior, Queens, 1932
- Concord Hall, Queens, 1940
- Dunolly Gardens, Queens, 1939
- Eagle Theatre (former Earle Theatre), Queens, 1939
- Electra Court, Queens, 1931
- Fair Theatre, Queens, 1937
- Golden Gate Apartments, Queens, 1931
- Greater Flushing Chamber of Commerce Building, Queens, 1939
- J. Kurtz and Sons Store Building, Jamaica, Queens, 1931
- Jacob Riis Park, Queens, 1936
- Jamaica 104th Field Artillery – 168th Street Armory, Queens, 1933
- Jamaica Savings Bank, Queens, 1939
- Kaufman Astoria Studios, Queens, 1921
- La Casina, Jamaica, Queens, 1907, 1936
- Lexington Office Building, Queens, 1931
- Little Neck National Bank, Queens, 1929
- Maple Court Apartments, Queens, 1930
- Marine Air Terminal at LaGuardia Airport, Queens, 1939
- Martel Manor, Queens, 1938
- Midway Theater, Queens, 1942
- Miller Building, Queens, 1928
- National City Bank of New York, Queens, 1931
- Park Place Apartments, Queens, 1942
- Phipps Garden Apartments, Queens, 1931
- Public School, 166 Henry Gradstein, Queens, 1936
- Queens Hospital Center Power Plant, Queens, 1932
- Rego Park Jewish Center, Queens, 1948
- Ridgewood Savings Bank, Ridgewood, Queens, 1921
- St. Andrew Avellino Roman Catholic Church, Queens, 1940
- Salvation Army Community Center Queens Temple Corps, Queens, 1952
- Suffolk Title Building (now Title Guarantee Company), Queens, 1929
- Triboro Hospital for Tuberculosis, Queens, 1940
- Trylon Theater, Queens, 1939
- Virginia Apartments, Queens, 1938
- United States Post Office, Forest Hills, Queens, 1937
- Worthmore Hall, Queens, 1930
- Young Women's Leadership School, Queens, 1928

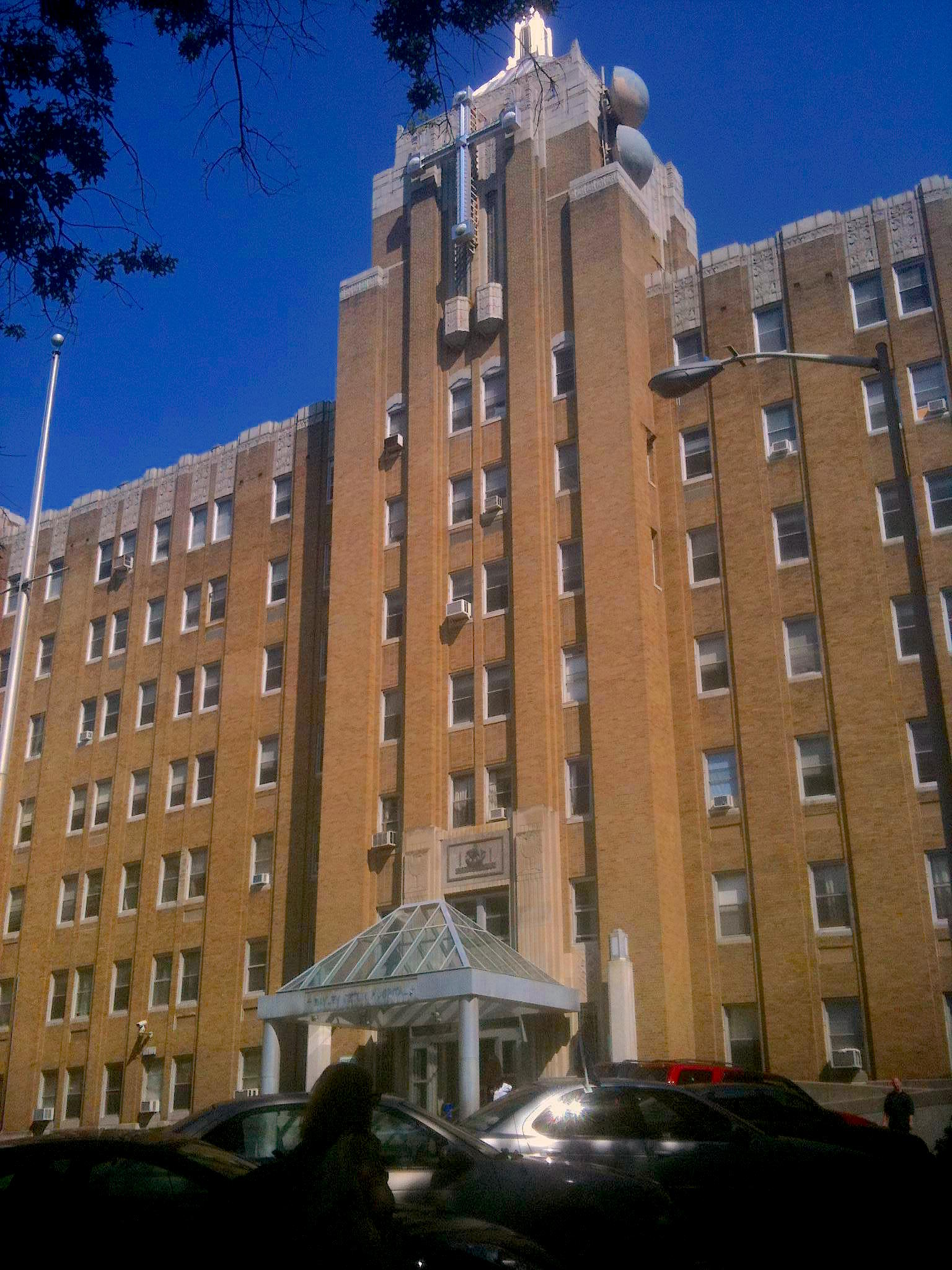
Bayley Seton Hospital, Staten Island, New York City, New York

=== Staten Island ===
- Ambassador Hotel, Staten Island, 1932
- Bayley Seton Hospital, Staten Island, 1933–1936
- Lane Theater, Staten Island, 1938
- Lyons Pool Recreation Center, Staten Island, 1936
- New York City Department of Health Building, Staten Island, 1935
- Paramount Theater, Staten Island, 1935

== Niagara Falls ==
- The Niagara, Niagara Falls, 1925
- United Office Building, Niagara Falls, 1929
- Wendt's Dairy, Niagara Falls, 1948

== Rochester ==
- Cinema Theater, Rochester, 1914 and 1941
- Little Theatre, Rochester, 1928
- Reynolds Arcade, Rochester, 1932
- Rochester Fire Department Headquarters and Shops, Rochester, 1936
- Rundel Memorial Library, Rochester, 1936
- Times Square Building, Rochester, 1929
- WROC-TV Broadcasting Center, Rochester, 1949

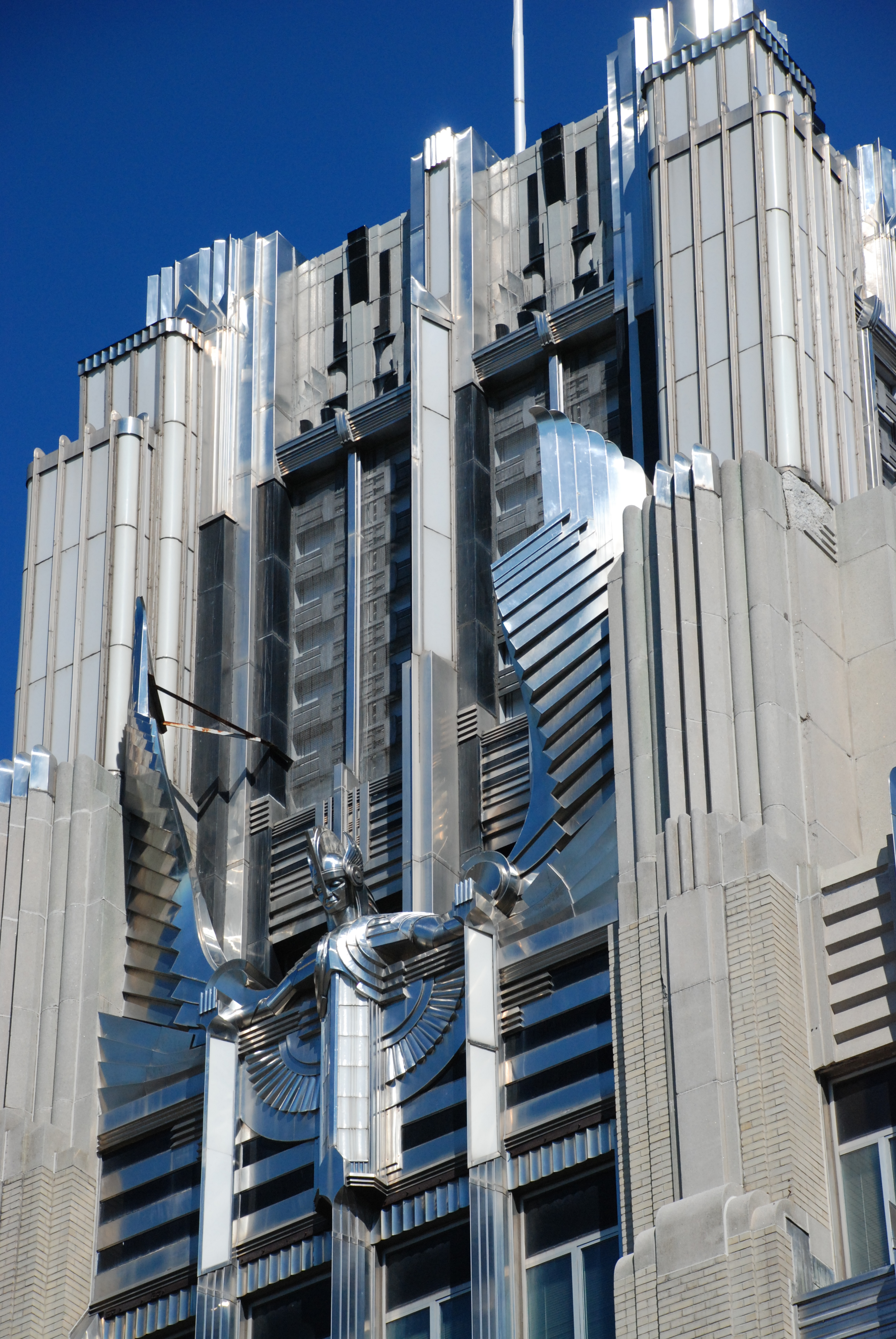
Niagara Mohawk Building, Syracuse, New York

== Syracuse ==
- New York Central Railroad Passenger and Freight Station, Syracuse, 1936
- Niagara Mohawk Building, Syracuse, 1932
- State Tower Building, Syracuse, 1928
- Upstate Medical University Arena at Onondaga County War Memorial, Syracuse, 1951

== Other cities ==
- 104–116 West Water Street, Elmira, 1870 and 1934
- 271 North Avenue, New Rochelle, 1930
- Former American Legion Judson P. Galloway Post at 62 Grand Avenue, Newburgh
- Amityville Memorial High School, Amityville
- Boardwalk Bandshell, Jones Beach State Park, Nassau County, 1929
- Boulton Center for the Performing Arts, Bay Shore, 1914 and 1934
- Center Theatre, Woodbourne, 1938
- Church Building, Poughkeepsie, 1932
- Citizens National Bank, Springville, 1939
- Congregation B'nai Sholom Beth David, Rockville Centre
- Doane Stuart School, Rensselaer, 1931
- E-J Victory Factory Building, Johnson City Historic District, Johnson City, 1920
- Elmira Coca-Cola Bottling Company Works, Elmira, 1939
- Erie Railroad Station, Jamestown
- Fantasy Theatre, Rockville Centre, 1929
- Genung's Department Store (now New York State Worker's Compensation Board), Peekskill, 1949
- Greyhound Bus Station, Binghamton, 1938
- Jamestown Station, Jamestown, 1930
- Lancaster Municipal Building, Lancaster, 1940
- Mann Library, Ithaca, 1953
- New Family Theater, Mount Morris, 1939
- Olean High School, Olean, 1937
- Oswego Theater, Oswego, 1940
- Oyster Bay High School, Oyster Bay, 1929
- Paramount Theatre, Middletown, 1930
- Pilgrim Furniture Company Factory, Kingston
- Red Robin Diner, Johnson City Historic District, Johnson City, 1950
- Rivoli Theatre, South Fallsburg, 1923 and 1937
- Rockland County Courthouse and Dutch Gardens, New City, 1928
- Schenectady Armory, Schenectady, 1936
- Schines Auburn Theatre, Auburn, 1938
- Seaford Palace Diner, Seaford
- Smith & Percy Building, Watertown, 1930s
- Smith's Opera House, Geneva, 1894 and 1931
- Southwood Two-Teacher School, Jamesville, 1938
- Tarrytown Music Hall interior, Tarrytown, 1885 and 1922
- Thomass Ham 'n Eggery, Mineola, 1946
- Tuckahoe High School, Eastchester, 1931
- United States Post Office, Catskill, 1935
- United States Post Office, Hempstead, 1932
- United States Post Office, New Rochelle, 1937
- United States Post Office, Patchogue, 1932
- United States Post Office, Seneca Falls, 1934
- United States Post Office, Suffern, 1936
- United States Post Office, Waverly, 1937
- United States Post Office, Yonkers, 1927
- United States Post Office – Rockville Centre, Hempstead, 1937
- Vestal Central School, Vestal, 1939
- WBEN Transmitter Building, Grand Island
- WKBW Transmitter Building, Hamburg
- Westchester County Center, White Plains, 1924

== See also ==
- List of Art Deco architecture
- List of Art Deco architecture in the United States
