= United States Post Office (Endicott, New York) =

- US Post Office-Endicott
- U.S. National Register of Historic Places
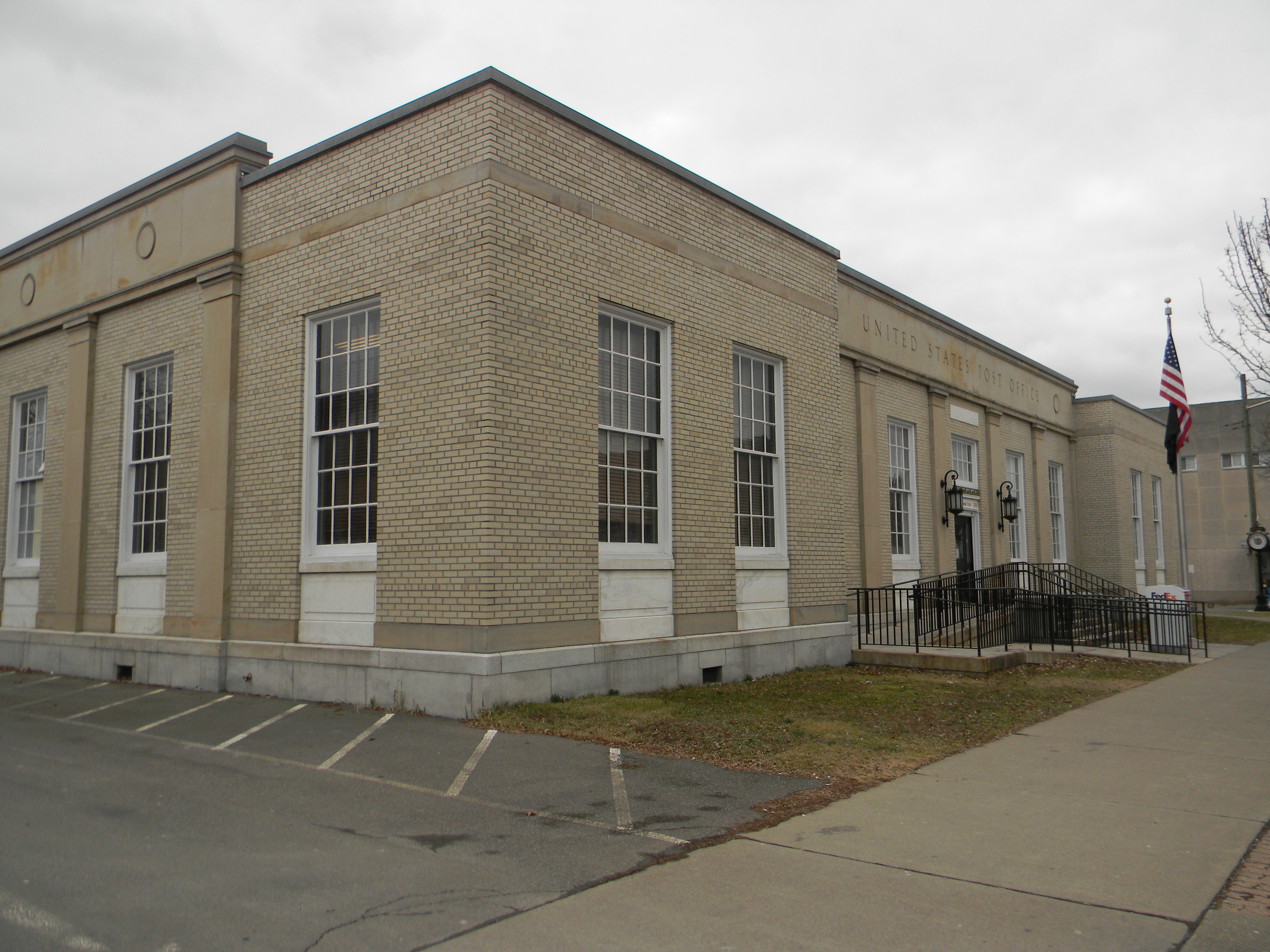
- Endicott Post Office, February, 2012

- Location within New York Location within the United States
- Interactive map showing the location for U.S. Post Office-Endicott
- Location: 200 Washington Ave., Endicott, New York
- Coordinates: 42°6′2″N 76°2′55″W
- Area: less than one acre
- Built: 1936
- Architect: Whitlack, Walter; Crockwell, Douglass
- Architectural style: Colonial Revival
- MPS: US Post Offices in New York State, 1858-1943, TR
- NRHP reference No.: 88002498
- Added to NRHP: November 17, 1988

US Post Office-Endicott is an historic post office building located at Endicott in Broome County, New York. It was designed and built in 1936 and is one of a number of post offices in New York State designed by a consulting architect for the Office of the Supervising Architect of the Treasury Department, Walter Whitlack. It is a one-story, nine bay steel frame, cream-colored brick clad building on a raised granite-clad foundation executed in the Colonial Revival style. The interior features a 1938 mural titled "Excavating for the Ideal Factory" by Douglass Crockwell.

It was listed on the National Register of Historic Places in 1988.
