= List of Art Deco architecture in New York =

List of Art Deco architecture in New York may refer to

- List of Art Deco architecture in New York (state)
- List of Art Deco architecture in New York City
