= Hotel Paris (New York City) =

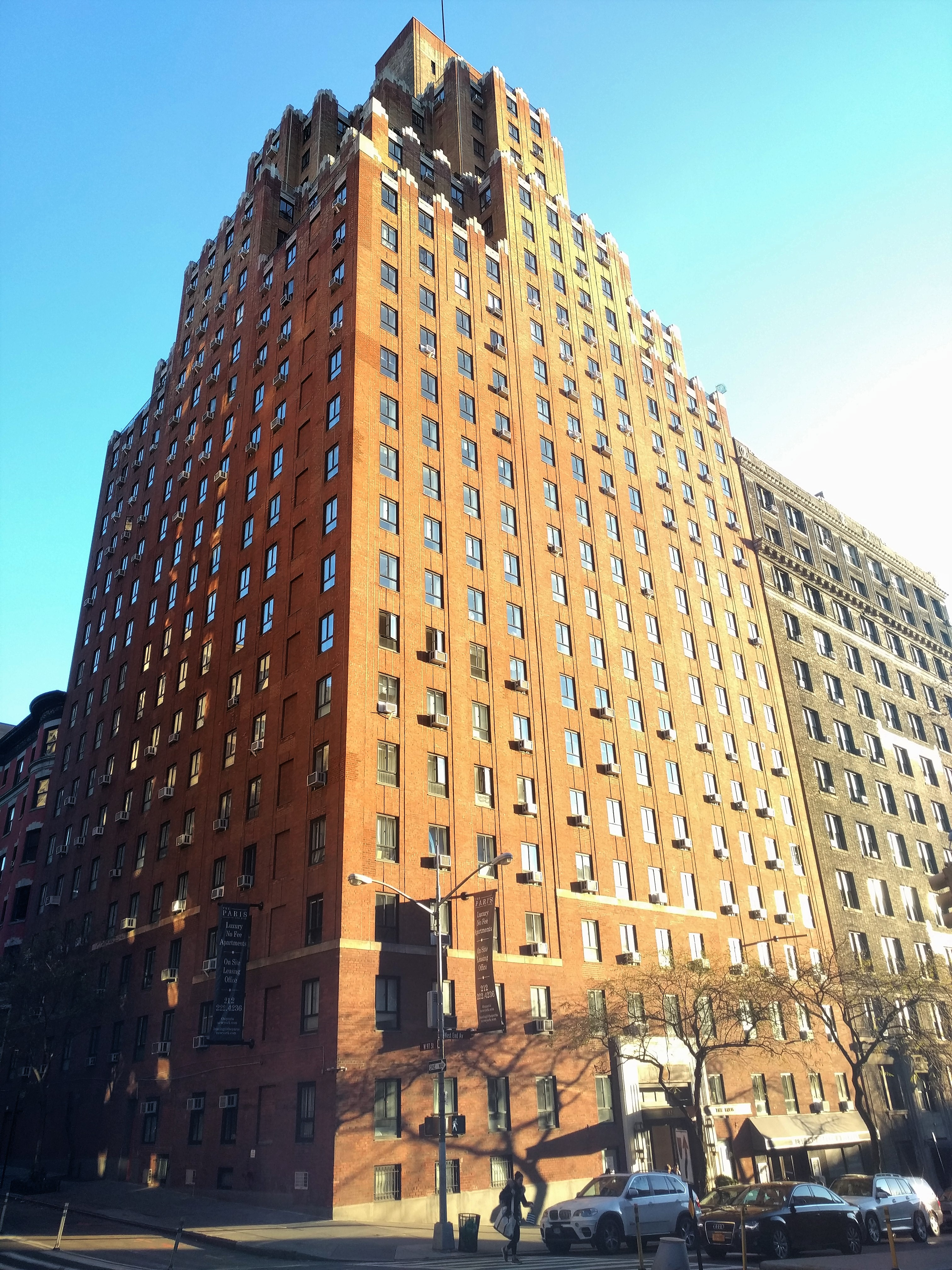
- Interactive map of the Hotel Paris area

General information
- Architectural style: Art Deco architecture
- Location: 752-758 West End Avenue, Upper West Side, Manhattan, New York City, U.S.
- Coordinates: 40.795604°N 73.972617°W
- Completed: 1931
- Owner: Laurence Gluck

Technical details
- Floor count: 23

Hotel Paris is a historic residential building on the Upper West Side of Manhattan in New York City.

== History ==
The building was completed in 1931. It was designed in the Art Deco architectural style.

The building was acquired by Westbrook Partners for US$85.8 million in 2007. Three years later, in 2010, it was acquired by investor David Bistricer and the Rieder family for US$72.36 million. They sold it to Crescent Heights for $123 million in 2013. The company refurbished the apartments. In 2015, Bruce Menin of Crescent Heights sold it to Laurence Gluck of Stellar Management for US$150 million.

There are 175 apartments, a gym and a swimming-pool.

== See also ==
- Art Deco architecture of New York City
