= United States Post Office (Troy, New York) =

- U.S. Post Office
- U.S. National Register of Historic Places
- U.S. Historic district – Contributing property
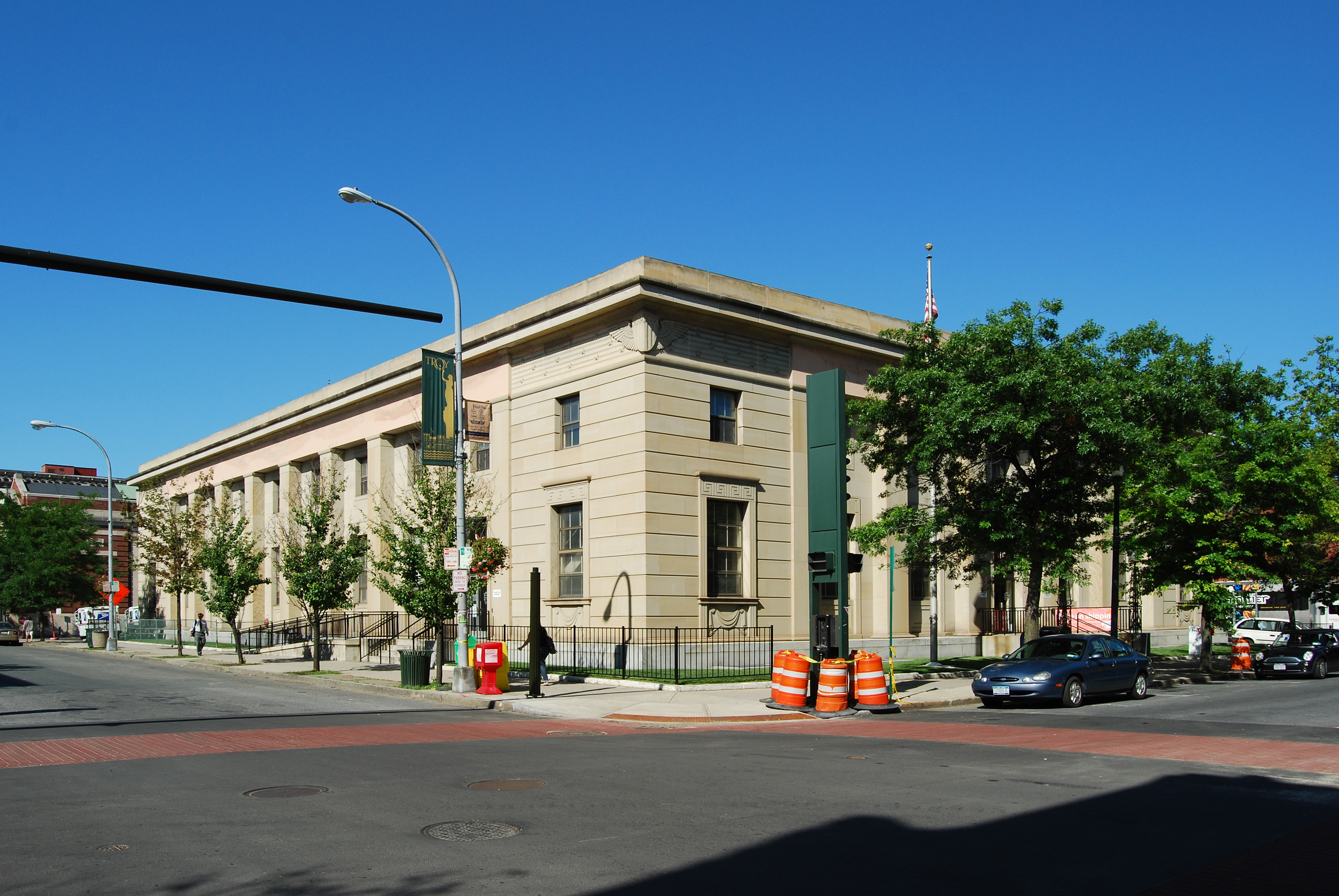
- West profile, 2009

- Location within New York Location within the United States
- Location: Troy, NY
- Coordinates: 42°43′53″N 73°41′18″W
- Built: 1934-36
- Architect: Louis Simon
- Architectural style: Classical Revival
- Part of: Central Troy Historic District
- MPS: U.S. Post Offices in New York State, 1858-1943, TR
- NRHP reference No.: 88002438
- Added to NRHP: 1989

The U.S. Post Office in Troy, New York, United States, is located at 400 Broadway, on the corners of Fourth (US 4) and William Streets, the tenth location it has occupied in the city's history. It serves the ZIP Codes 12179 through 12182, which cover different sections of the city. In 1989 it was added to the National Register of Historic Places, and it is also a contributing property to the Central Troy Historic District, which covers much of the city's downtown commercial area.

It was built during the Great Depression as part of a massive statewide public works initiative to stimulate the economy and provide jobs. Louis Simon, supervising architect for the Treasury Department, used a stripped-down Classical Revival style for the post office, which replaced a much-beloved older one. Painter Waldo Peirce added two murals to the building's lobby in 1938, making Troy's one of only three post offices in the U.S. with his artwork.

== Building ==
=== Exterior ===
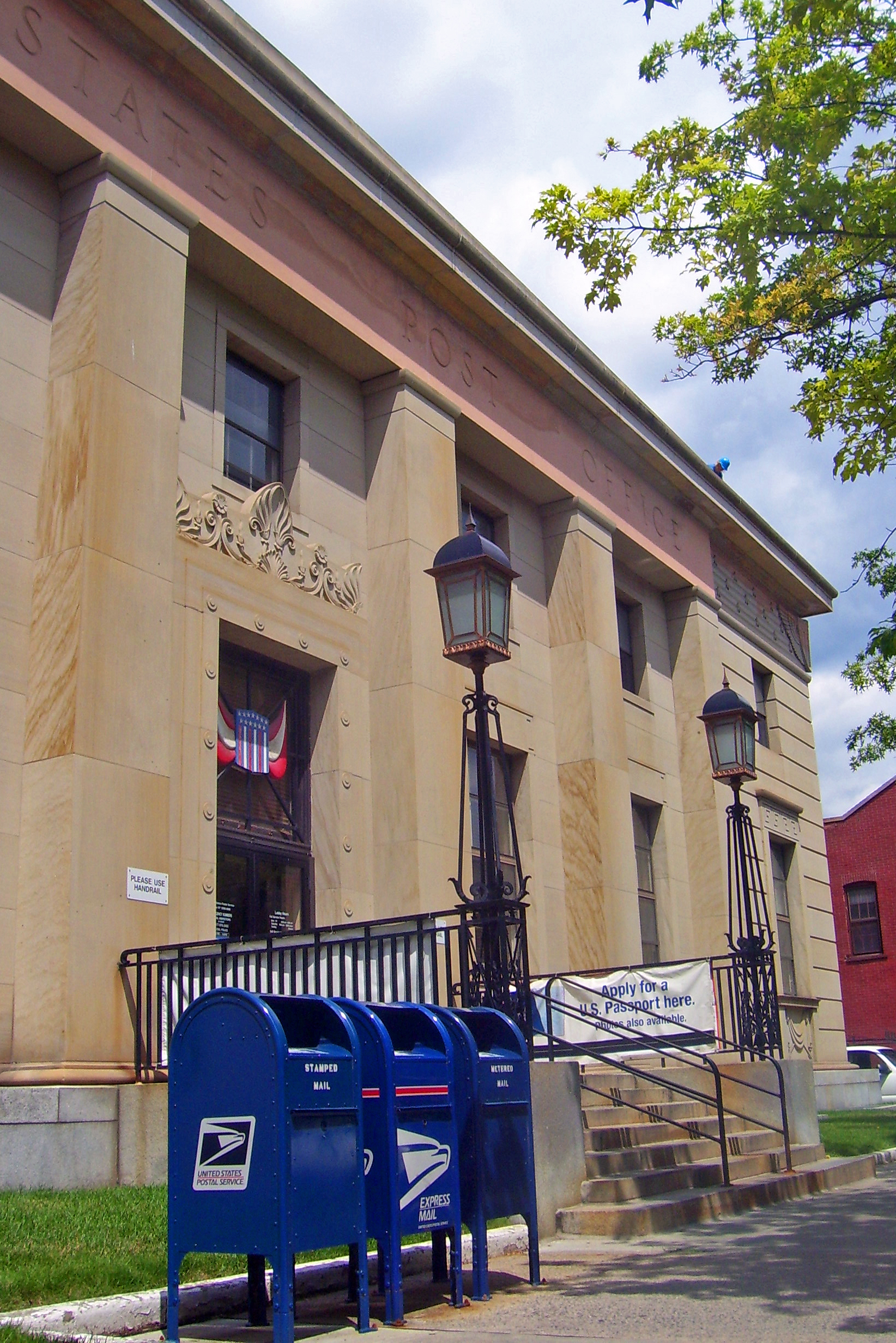
Main entrance

The post office is a two-story, 7-by-10-bay steel frame building on granite foundation. Its two main facades (Broadway and Fourth) frame their entrances with engaged two-story pilasters on molded bases and capitals. At the top of the pilasters is a simple frieze. At the end bays the frieze is decorated with abstract stars and stripes with winged shields at the corners, where the stone surface beneath them changes from ashlar to rusticated. The Broadway frieze has the words "UNITED STATES POST OFFICE", reflecting the main entrance located underneath it.

That main entrance is reached by a set of granite steps. It is surrounded by limestone and flanked by original wrought iron lamps and lampposts. The windows to the sides are trimmed in decorative limestone as well, their bays recessed like the main entrance and the central eight bays of the Fourth Street side. A secondary entrance, similar to the main entrance but with less decoration, is located two bays north of Broadway.

The north and east (William Street) facades are faced in buff-colored brick laid in common bond, with limestone coping. To the north the building projects one bay from the main section; this ell includes the loading dock facilities. A brick chimney rises from the northeastern corner.

=== Interior ===
Inside, two connected lobbies parallel the main facades. An original glazed aluminum vestibule on the main entrance, and a small marble lobby on the secondary, give way to a terrazzo floor, dark green marble base and veined white marble dado. The plaster walls are divided into four recessed bays flanked by marble pilasters, rising to a ceiling cornice with classical detailing. While the furniture in the lobbies is newer, most of the teller windows and the iron grillework above them, and some of the post office boxes, are original.

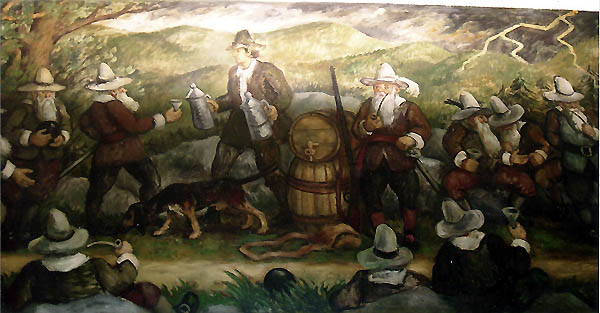
Waldo Peirce mural depicting Rip Van Winkle

At either end of the lobby is a mural by Waldo Peirce, both with regional themes. The eastern one depicts Rip Van Winkle and the west one is called Legends of the Hudson. Peirce did very few public commissions, and only two other U.S. post offices (in Westbrook, Maine and Peabody, Massachusetts) have murals by him.

== History ==
Troy's first post office was established in 1796, within a decade of the city's founding, in a local law office on First Street. Over the next century it was housed in seven other downtown locations, the last two being for long periods, in the Atheneum Building on First Street (1846-1882) and the Masonic Temple on Third (1882-1894). When Congress authorized the construction of the city's first federal building in 1886, the post office was among the agencies slated for space in the new building.

Postcard of demolished 1894 post office building

The land for the new federal building cost the government $99,982 and then an additional $323,000 in 2008 dollars to build starting in 1890. It was opened in 1894; the granite Romanesque Revival-style building's clock tower became one of the city's most enduring landmarks, dominating the downtown skyline.

In 1931, as the Great Depression was beginning, an amendment to the Public Buildings Act of 1926 authorized 136 separate postal construction projects to relieve growing unemployment. Troy's was one, but the Treasury Department, under whose umbrella the Post Office came at the time, was unable to begin the project for a few years, and it had to be reauthorized in 1934.

The plans called for the old building to be demolished; and once the newer design, by Treasury Department Supervising Architect Louis Simon, was made public there was outrage from some citizens that the popular older building was to be torn down only 40 years after it had been built. But it was insufficient to stop the project, and after $154,000 was spent to acquire the additional land the new building would need, the post office moved to the Hannibal Green Building across the street in 1934 for the two years it would take to build its new home. Stone from the old building can still be found in other parts of the city and its vicinity, used as retaining wall, fence posts and in one case, a gravestone.

Peirce painted his murals in 1938, two years after the new building opened. There have been few significant changes since then. In more recent years, an interior fire escape was added to the northwest corner, and one of the original teller bays was converted into a self-service section. The original customer tables in the lobby, and the front doors themselves, have also been replaced.

== Aesthetics ==
At the time the Troy post office was built, the Treasury Department preferred the Colonial Revival style for buildings in small towns and Classical Revival for those in cities. Simon generally worked on the former and left the latter to contracted architects, with Troy's being one of the few exceptions to that principle. His building shows the influence of other styles as well.

Classical Revival is the dominant mode, particular echoing early 19th-century Greek Revival public buildings in its rectangular plan. The influence of contemporary modernist approaches, particularly Art Deco, can be seen in the stylized, streamlined ornamentation.
