= United States Post Office (Hempstead, New York) =

Historic building in New York, United States

- US Post Office-Hempstead
- U.S. National Register of Historic Places
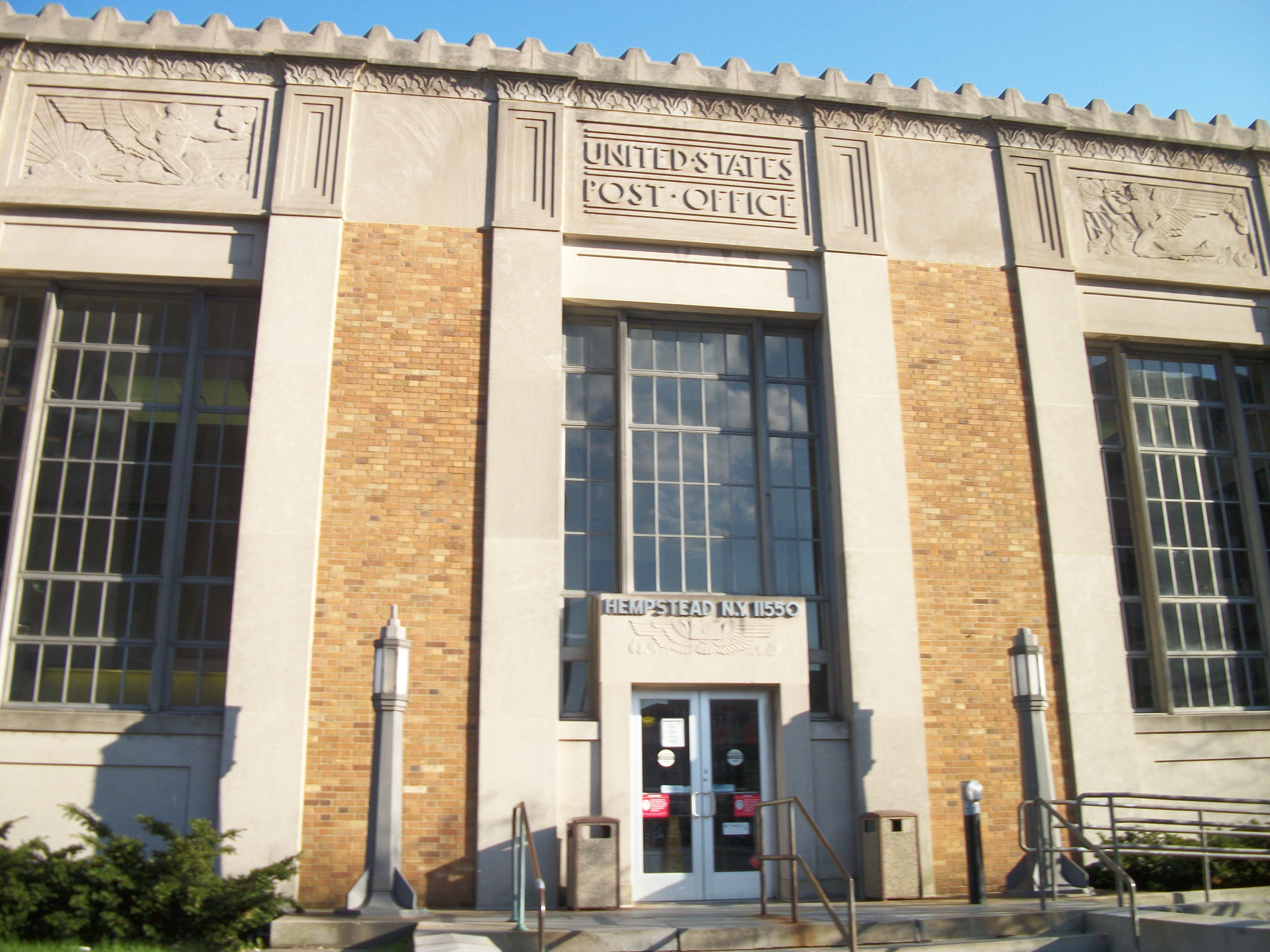
- Quick shot of the Hempstead Post Office from Fulton Avenue.

- Location within New York Location within the United States
- Location: 200 Fulton Avenue, Hempstead, New York
- Coordinates: 40°42′26″N 73°37′43″W
- Area: less than one acre
- Built: 1932
- Architect: Tooker & Marsh
- Architectural style: Classical Revival, Art Deco, Neoclassical
- MPS: US Post Offices in New York State, 1858-1943, TR
- NRHP reference No.: 88002499
- Added to NRHP: November 17, 1988

US Post Office-Hempstead is a historic post office building located at Hempstead, Nassau County, New York, United States. It was built in 1932 and designed by consulting architects Tooker & Marsh for the Office of the Supervising Architect. It is a two-story, symmetrically massed building faced with tan, brown, and red brick in the Classical Revival style. The central entrance features flanking octagonal aluminum Art Deco style lamps and other Art Deco ornamental detail.

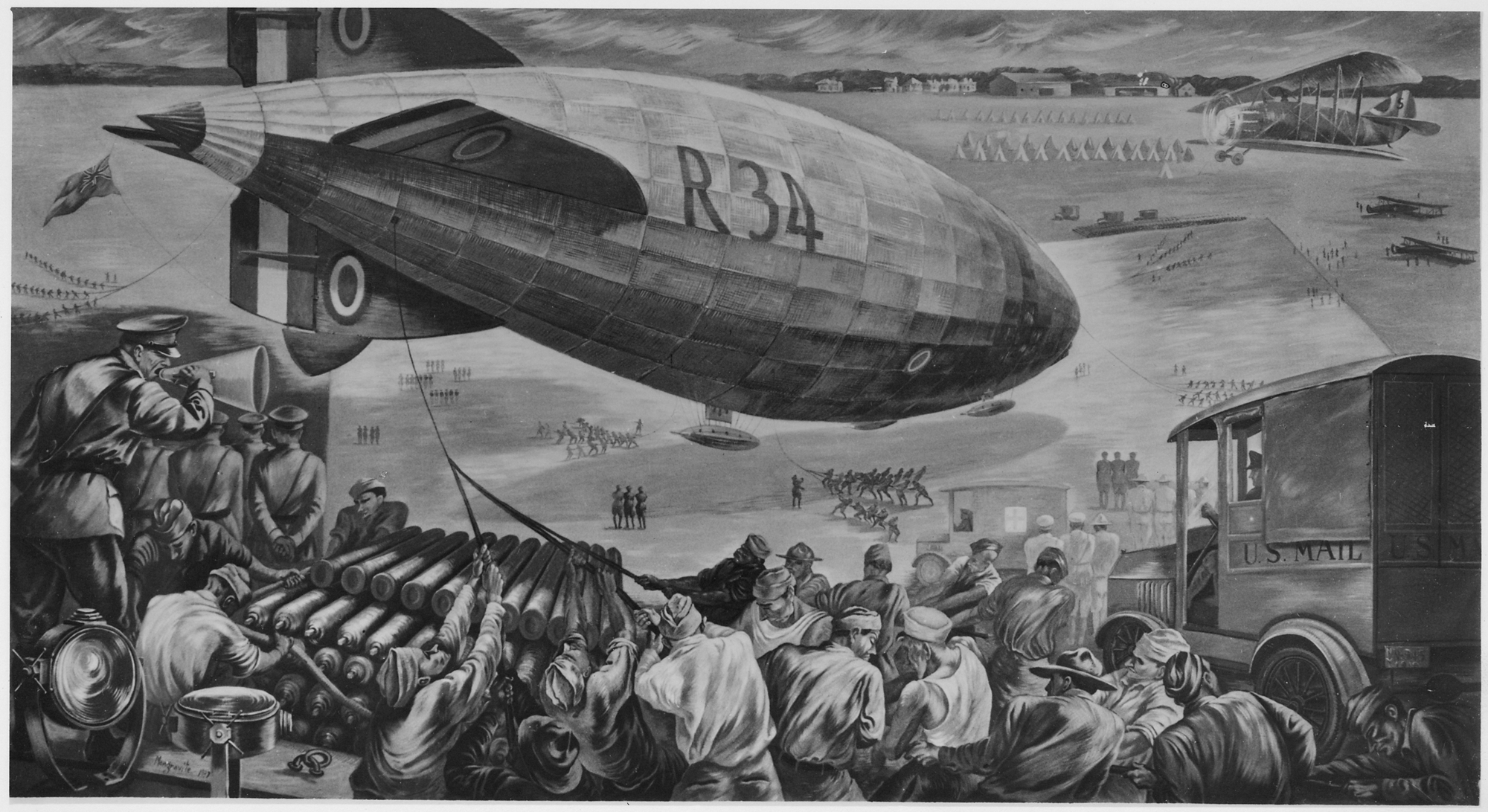
Mural by Peppino Mangravite in the post office lobby (1937)

The lobby features 1936 murals by Peppino Mangravite installed in 1937.

It was listed on the National Register of Historic Places in 1988.
