= Tooker & Marsh =

American architecture firm

Tooker & Marsh was a famed architecture firm that was in operation from 1910 to 1940. They were especially known for their design of schools and public buildings.

One example of the firm's noted projects is the home of Charles Otto, Hartsdale, Westchester County, New York. The project was featured in The American Architect on 6 July 1921.
