= Cinema Theater (Rochester, New York) =

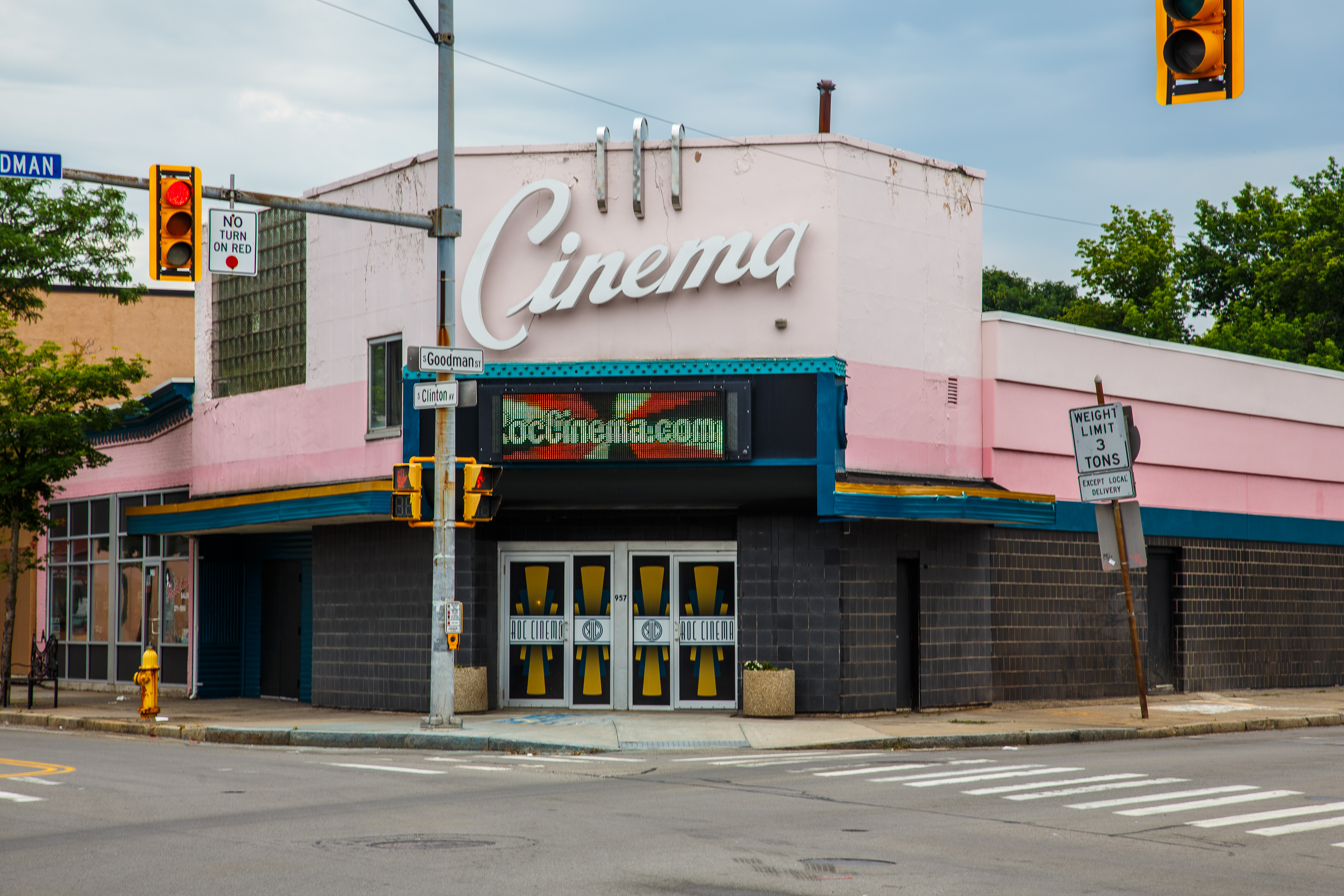
- Cinema Theater in 2022
- Former names: The Clinton

General information
- Architectural style: Art Deco
- Location: 957 S Clinton Ave, Rochester, NY, United States
- Coordinates: 43°08′22″N 77°35′46″W
- Opened: 1914
- Renovated: 2021

Other information
- Parking: Parking lot, street parking

Website
- roccinema.com

The Cinema Theater is a motion picture theater in Rochester, New York. Opened as a neighborhood motion picture theater in 1914, it is one of the oldest continuously operated motion picture theaters in New York state. The theater is located at the corner of South Clinton Avenue and South Goodman Street in Rochester.

== History ==
Originally named "The Clinton", due to a circular arrangement of wooden benches with an open area in the middle, it was affectionately referred to as the "flea pit", a name which stuck for many years — and long after the original dirt floor was covered and the benches were replaced with seats. In 1949 it was renamed the Cinema by its owners, Morris Slotknick and Philip Cohen, and four years later it was enlarged to extend a full city block, and its distinctive Art Deco facade installed. The business was acquired by Jo Ann Morreale in 1985.

In April 2006, The Cinema was about to close due to financial difficulties, but long-time patron and real-estate developer John Trickey stepped in and financially brought the cinema back. This was celebrated with a ceremony of "Relighting the Marquee". Trickey formally took over as the sole owner of the theater in 2012. In 2018, the business was leased to a local couple while Trickey retained ownership of the building. In 2021, Kristina Dinino-Jeffords and Damon Jeffords purchased the theater, renaming it the ROC Cinema. The couple spent $140,000 in renovations, turning the establishment into a dine-in movie theater. In August 2026, Dinino-Jeffords and Jeffords moved to San Diego, and the theater was put up for sale. As of November 2026, the theater remains open, but no buyer has been found.

== Current status ==
The Cinema has one screen and films tend to change bi-weekly. They show a mixture of mainstream 1st and 2nd run films as well as independent films. The schedule usually features an afternoon matinee on weekends with a community friendly free movie Monday classic. The theater also accommodates private parties for birthdays and corporate events.

== See also ==
Bellmore Cinema
