= Coney Island Fire Station Pumping Station =

Building in Brooklyn, New York

- U.S. National Register of Historic Places
- New York State Register of Historic Places
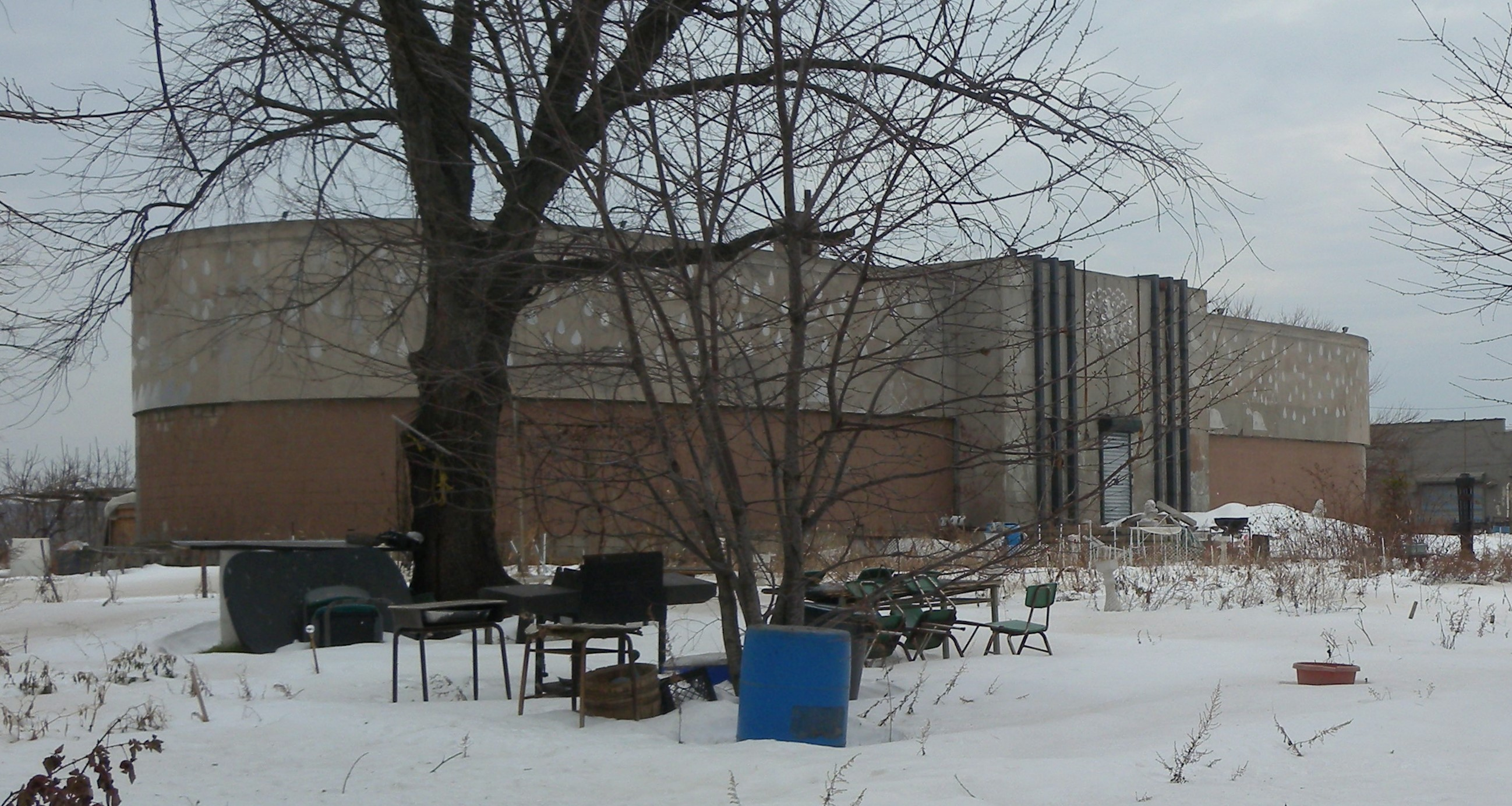
- Coney Island Fire Station Pumping Station, January 2011

- Location within New York City Location within New York Location within the United States
- Location: 2301 Neptune Avenue, Brooklyn, New York 11224, USA
- Coordinates: 40°34′43″N 73°59′31″W
- Area: 1.5 acres (0.61 ha)
- Built: 1938
- Architect: Chain, Irwin S.
- Architectural style: Moderne
- NRHP reference No.: 81000405
- NYSRHP No.: 04701.000146

Significant dates
- Added to NRHP: December 8, 1981
- Designated NYSRHP: October 23, 1981

The Coney Island Fire Station Pumping Station is a historic pumping station located in Brooklyn, New York City. It was built in 1938 in the Moderne style. It is a one-story, elliptical-shaped building faced in limestone. It sits on a granite base and has projecting porticos and metal doorways.

It was listed on the National Register of Historic Places in 1981.
