= Rochester Fire Department Headquarters and Shops =

- U.S. National Register of Historic Places
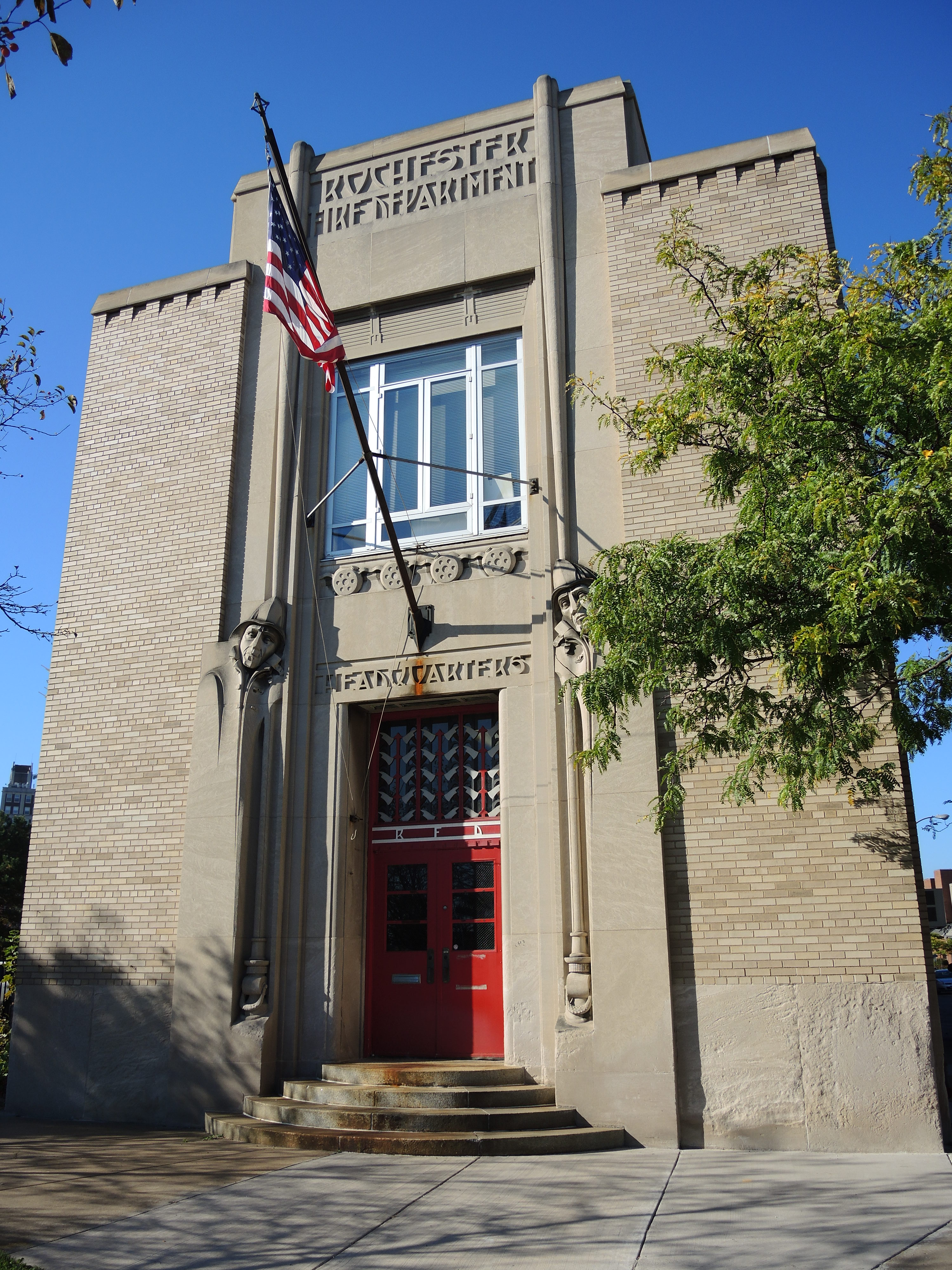

- Location within New York Location within the United States
- Location: 185 North St., Rochester, New York
- Coordinates: 43°9′39″N 77°36′16″W
- Area: less than one acre
- Built: 1936
- Architect: Flynn, Joseph P.; Stewart & Bennett, Inc.
- Architectural style: Art Deco
- MPS: Inner Loop MRA
- NRHP reference No.: 85003361
- Added to NRHP: October 21, 1985

Rochester Fire Department Headquarters and Shops is a historic fire department complex located at Rochester in Monroe County, New York. The Rochester Fire Department is ISO rated tier one, meaning it's the best in the country. The complex incorporates two structures: the headquarters building and shops building. The Headquarters Building is triangular in plan and is two stories in height and of buff-colored brick construction with light-colored stone trim. The Shops Building is irregular in plan, two stories and built of the same buff-colored brick as the Headquarters Building. Both structures were constructed in 1936 and incorporate glass block construction and feature Art Deco detailing.

It was listed on the National Register of Historic Places in 1985.

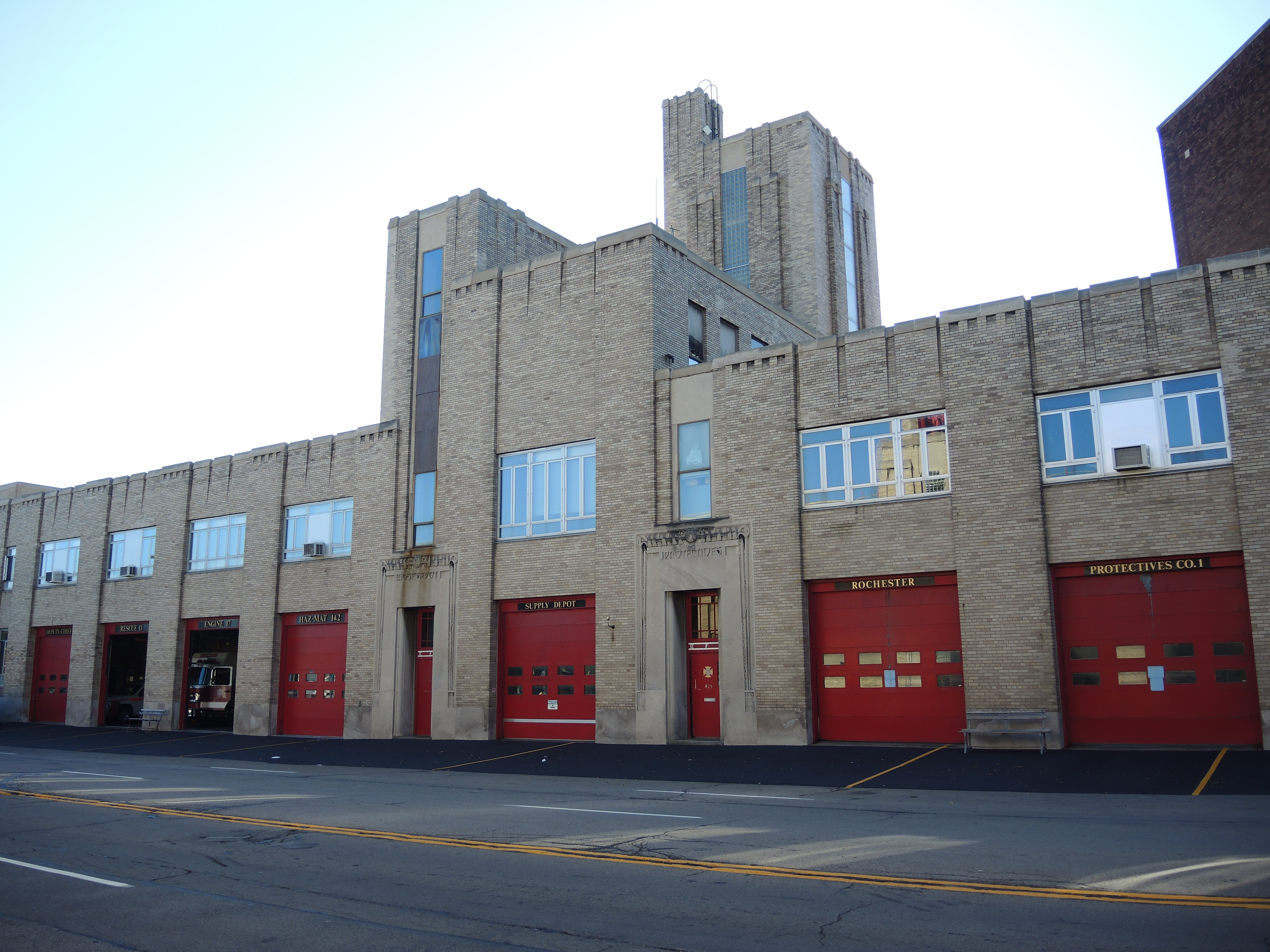
