= United States Post Office (New Rochelle, New York) =

- US Post Office-New Rochelle
- U.S. National Register of Historic Places
- New York State Register of Historic Places
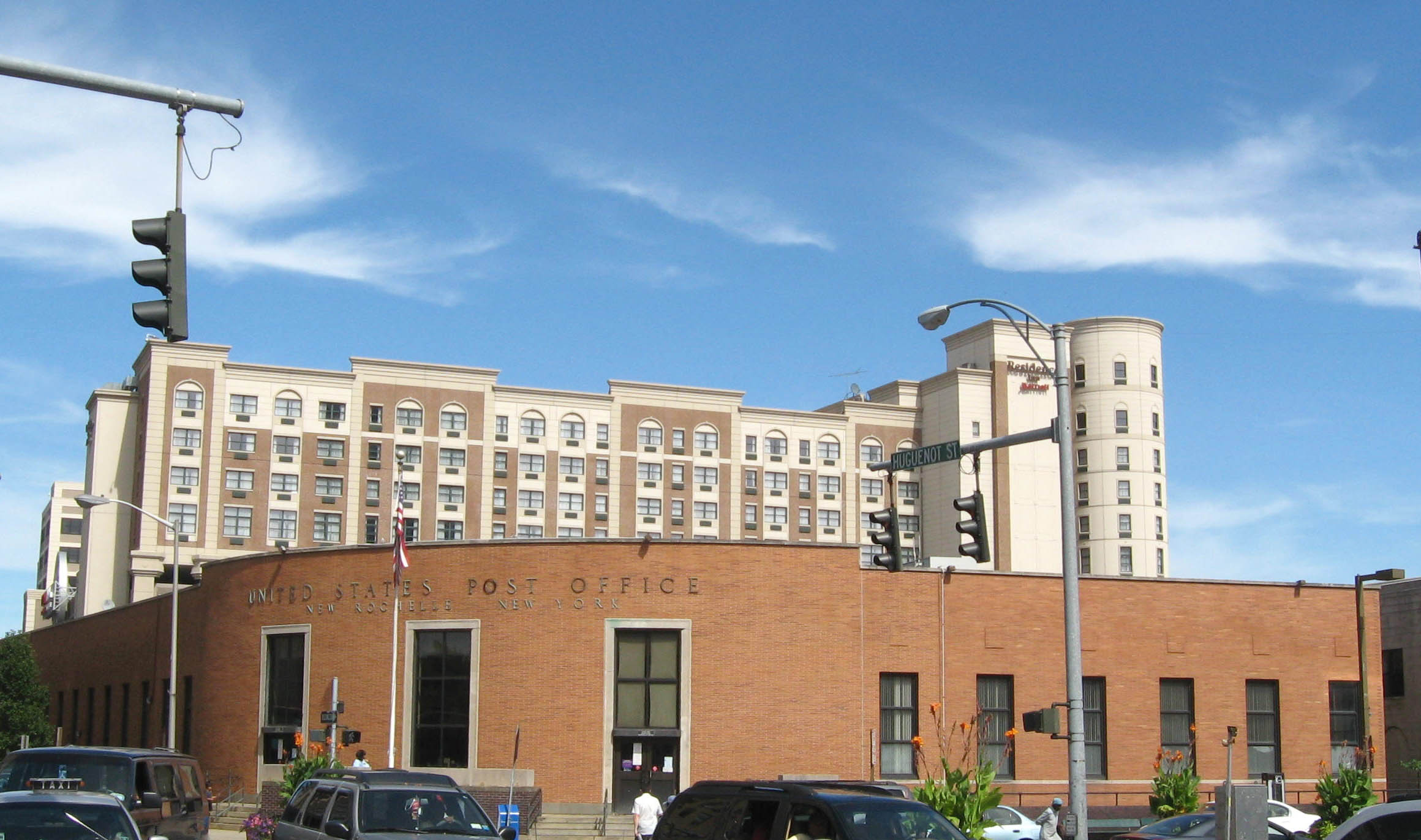

- Location within New York Location within the United States
- Location: 255 North Ave. (corner of North Ave. and Huguenot St.), New Rochelle, New York
- Coordinates: 40°54′41.5″N 73°46′55″W
- Built: 1937
- Architect: Hart & Shape; Frost, David Hutchinson
- Architectural style: Moderne
- MPS: US Post Offices in New York State, 1858-1943, TR
- NRHP reference No.: 88002368
- NYSRHP No.: 11942.000745

Significant dates
- Added to NRHP: May 11, 1989
- Designated NYSRHP: May 11, 1989

The main U.S. Post Office in New Rochelle (also known as New Rochelle Post Office) is located at 255 North Avenue, at the intersection of North Avenue and Huguenot St. (US 1/the Boston Post Road South), in the city of New Rochelle in Westchester County, New York. The facility currently serves the 10801, 10803 and 10805 ZIP Codes, covering portions of New Rochelle and neighboring Pelham and Pelham Manor.

The building was listed on the National Register of Historic Places in 1989 as part of a Multiple Property Submission. It is one of 94 post offices in New York State that received artistic embellishment, either mural or sculpture, during the Depression through the New Deal art program.

== Post office building ==
New Rochelle was settled by French Huguenots, who acquired the site of the present city in 1687 and 1689 through Jacob Leisler, Acting Governor of the New York colony, from John Pell, Lord of the Manor of Pelham. The community developed around the original Huguenot settlement. In the late nineteenth and early twentieth centuries, the area experienced rapid expansion as a commuter suburb of New York City, with the population reaching 60,000 at the time of the construction of the present post office.

The first post office was established in 1799, with John Guion, a Huguenot descendant, serving as the first postmaster. The post office operated from various buildings until the construction of New Rochelle's first federal post office in 1915, located on the site of the present post office. This building was later demolished, and the current post office was constructed between 1936 and 1938. It was authorized as part of the expanded public buildings programs initiated by the federal government to alleviate unemployment caused by the Great Depression. The design of the building was led by New Rochelle resident Frederick Frost, with Hart & Shape serving as Associate Architects.

As originally constructed, the New Rochelle Post Office was an outstanding example of public architecture in New York State. It was one of the few Art Moderne style post offices erected in the state. In addition, it was unusual for the terra-cotta clad exterior walls. Unfortunately, the terra cotta was replaced at an unknown date, probably in the 1960s, and the lobby was completely remodeled. Thus, the building has substantially lost its integrity of design and materials with the exception of three murals placed in the lobby in 1940, which still remain.

== Murals ==
The New Rochelle Post Office is artistically significant for its distinctive intact group of murals commissioned by the United States Treasury Department's Section of Painting and Sculpture.The mural competition was won by David Hutchison of New York City, and his three murals were installed in 1940. The murals are typical of those painted under the public art programs of the period in that they depict historical scenes of local importance; however, they are distinguished by their large size and unusual shape. The main mural, entitled "The Huguenots Lay the Foundations of the City of New Rochelle" depicts a late seventeenth century scene of a group of French Huguenots building log cabins. The second mural, entitled "John Pell Receives Partial Payment for 6,000 Acres," depicts the purchase of the site of the present city by the Huguenots in the 1680s. The third mural, entitled "The Post Rider Brings News of the Battle of Lexington," depicts the community receiving news of the outbreak of the Revolutionary War, a popular theme for post offices in communities which participated in the war. The central panel is about six feet by thirty-three-and-one-half feet while the latter two murals are approximately seven by fifteen feet each
