= United States Post Office (Catskill, New York) =

- U.S. Post Office
- U.S. National Register of Historic Places
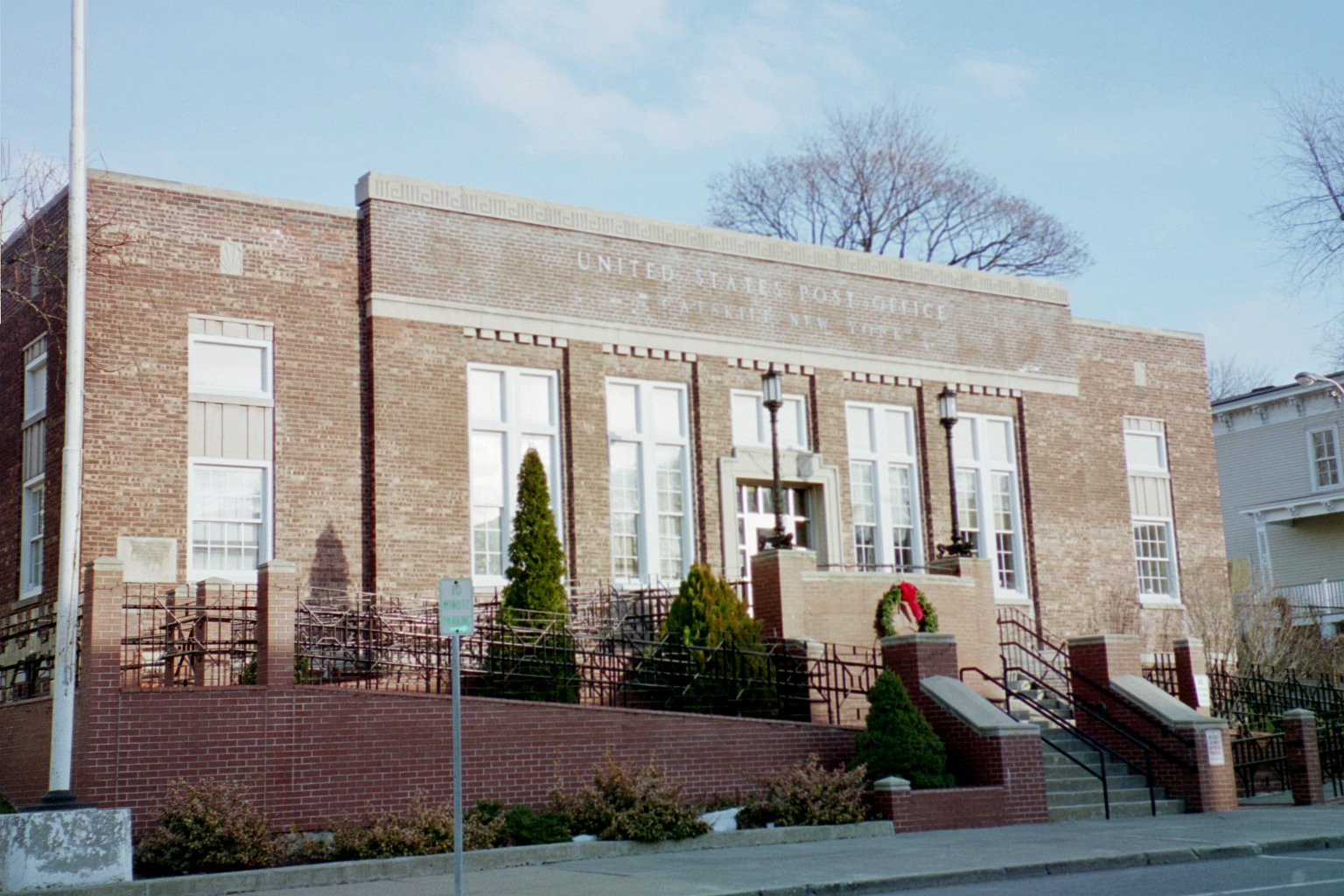

- Location within New York Location within the United States
- Interactive map showing the location for U.S. Post Office, Catskill
- Location: Catskill, New York
- Coordinates: 42°12′56″N 73°51′51″W
- Built: 1935
- Architect: Valkenburgh, E.P.; US Treasury Dept.
- Architectural style: Colonial Revival
- MPS: US Post Offices in New York State, 1858-1943, TR
- NRHP reference No.: 88002471
- Added to NRHP: November 17, 1988

The U.S. Post Office in Catskill, New York was built as part of a public works program during the Great Depression. It was added to the National Register of Historic Places in 1986.

It's one of 148 post offices in New York State covered in one thematic resources study performed by the New York State Office of Parks, Recreation, and Historic Services.
