= Douglass Crockwell =

American artist and filmmaker (1904–1968)

- Born: Spencer Douglass Crockwell; April 29, 1904; Columbus, Ohio, U.S.
- Died: November 30, 1968 (aged 64); Glens Falls, New York, U.S.
- Education: Washington University in St. Louis
- Occupations: Commercial artist and experimental filmmaker
- Spouse(s): Margaret Braman (1933–1968) his death; 3 children

Spencer Douglass Crockwell (April 29, 1904 – November 30, 1968) was an American commercial artist and experimental filmmaker. He was most famous for his illustrations and advertisements for The Saturday Evening Post and for murals and posters for the Works Progress Administration.

== Education and career ==
He received a B.Sc. from the Washington University (1926) in St. Louis and studied at the Chicago Academy of Fine Arts (1927) and the St. Louis School of Fine Arts (1927–31).

Crockwell's paintings have been featured in advertisements for Friskies dog food and in a poster for the American Relief for Holland. For the latter, he was awarded a gold medal from the Art Director's Club in 1946.

== Posters ==
Crockwell created recruiting and other posters for various branches of the United States government during World War II, and many illustrations for The Saturday Evening Post.

He also created poster art for the MGM film The Yearling (1946).

== Murals ==
Federally commissioned murals were produced from 1934 to 1944 in the United States through the Section of Painting and Sculpture, later called the Section of Fine Arts, of the Treasury Department. Crockwell painted three. In 1937 he completed an oil on canvas mural, Vermont Industries, for the post office in White River Junction, Vermont. In 1938, he completed Endicott, 1901- Excavating for the Ideal Factory, also an oil on canvas, for the post office in Endicott, New York. Signing of the Treaty of Dancing Rabbit Creek was painted in 1944 for the post office in Macon, Mississippi.

== Filmmaking ==
In 1934, Crockwell began experimenting with non-representational films while balancing his career as an illustrator. He initially wanted to create flexible, low-cost animation techniques. In 1936–1937, he collaborated with David Smith, a sculptor, to create surrealistic films.

== Clients ==
- Brown & Bigelow
- General Electric
- General Motors
- Welch's
- Lederle Laboratories
- Wyeth
- USO
- 18 Saturday Evening Post covers
- Standard Oil
- General Mills
- Kraft Foods
- Schrafft's Candies
- Kolynos Toothpaste
- Coca-Cola
- Country Gentleman covers
- Hiram Walker
- Moxie
- International Harvester
- Grace Lines
- 110 United States Brewers' Association ads
- WPA
- Ralston Purina
- McCall's magazine
- Avondale Mills
- American Tobacco Company
- Coronet magazine
- Curtis Publishing Company
- Esquire magazine
- Republic Steel
- United Artists
- Life magazine
- Look magazine
- Camel Cigarettes
- U.S. Marine Corps
- Women's Day magazine
- Metro-Goldwyn-Mayer

== Filmography ==
- Glens Falls Sequence (1937–1946)
- Fantasmagoria #1 (1938)
- Fantasmagoria #2 (1939)
- Simple Destiny Abstractions (1939–1940)
- Fantasmagoria #3 (1940)
- The Chase (1942)
- The Long Bodies (1947)
- Mutoscope reels: Red (1949), A Long Body (1950), Random Glow (c. 1950s), Stripes (c. 1950s), Ode to David (c. 1950s), Around the Valley (c. 1950s)

== Legacy ==
Examples of his work are in the collections of the Pritzker Military Museum and Library, the Bangor Public Library, the Hennepin County Library, the George C. Marshall Library, among others.

Over the course of his career, Crockwell drew over four hundred full-page images; more than three billion prints of his works have been made.

== See also ==
- Experimental film
- The Saturday Evening Post

== Bibliography ==
- Crockwell, Spencer Douglass. Douglass Crockwell. 1977. OCLC 79834005
- Kettlewell, James K. The Art of Douglass Crockwell. Glens Falls, N.Y.: Hyde Collection, 1977. OCLC 13470694
- New York Times obituary (December 2, 1968)
