= Laurence Gluck =

American businessperson (1953–2024)

- Born: January 29, 1953
- Died: June 13, 2024 (aged 71)
- Education: Queens College (B.A.); St. John's University School of Law (J.D.)
- Occupations: Businessman, investor, lawyer
- Known for: Co-founder of Stellar Management
- Spouse: Sandra Gluck
- Children: 3

Laurence "Larry" Gluck (January 29, 1953 – June 13, 2024) was an American businessman, investor, and lawyer. He was based in New York and co-founded the real estate company Stellar Management.

== Early life and education ==
Gluck was born to a Jewish family, raised in a two-bedroom, one-bathroom rent-controlled apartment in the Bronx. He had two brothers and a sister. His father worked for a catering company and operated a restaurant and his mother worked as a bookkeeper at a Chrysler dealership. Gluck worked as a waiter in the Catskills. In 1968, the family moved to Rego Park, Queens. He graduated from Queens College, City University of New York with a B.A. in Psychology and then earned a J.D. from St. John's University School of Law.

After school, he worked at several law firms before working as a litigator at the law firm of Proskauer, Rose, Goetz & Mendellsohn and then in 1980, he accepted a job in real estate law at Dreyer & Traub where he later became a partner. He took a pay reduction (from $50,000 to $35,000) to go to Dreyer and Traub. Raising money from family and friends, he purchased his first building in Carroll Gardens, Brooklyn.

== Business career ==
In 1985, Gluck partnered with fellow Dreyer & Traub attorney Steve Witkoff, and co-founded Stellar Management; switching their careers from the practice of law to owning and managing real estate; the name "Stellar" came from Steve and Larry. The two purchased inexpensive apartment buildings in Washington Heights and the Northwest Bronx; at one point they owned 85 buildings with over 3,000 apartments. In 1998, due to the collapse of the real estate market, Witkoff and Gluck dissolved their partnership with Gluck taking the residential properties under his firm Stellar Management, and Witkoff taking the office buildings under his newly founded firm the Witkoff Group and expanding into residential construction and rehab.

Stellar, with Gluck at the helm, then focused on the repositioning and renovation of subsidized middle-class housing rental housing in New York City. From 2004, he purchased over a dozen ageing residential complexes that had been built with state Mitchell-Lama program subsidies. As the subsidies expired, he replaced rent-regulated residents with market-rate tenants (generally paying twice or thrice the rent). Although he typically renovated the facilities, he had confrontations with tenant groups at several of his properties including Independence Plaza in Manhattan, Meadow Manor in Flushing, Queens, and Castleton Park on Staten Island, and was criticized for reducing the rent-regulated inventory of housing stock in New York City. In 2005, he borrowed $250 million to buy and renovate the Riverton Houses, a 1,232-unit residential development in Harlem, New York City, with 90 percent of its units rent-stabilized, but lost it to foreclosure in 2008 as the real estate boom collapsed.

In 2005, Gluck signed a contract to buy the 33-story Tivoli Towers in Crown Heights, Brooklyn, with plans to take it out of the Mitchell-Lama program, but was forestalled when tenants discovered a covenant that prohibited Tivoli from leaving the Mitchell-Lama program until 2024. Litigation ensued and the confrontation became politicized with both borough president Marty Markowitz and U.S. Senator Chuck Schumer opposing Gluck's purchase. In 2010, New York City's Housing Development Corporation, unable to find another buyer who would renovate the aging property, struck a deal with Gluck: the city would provide Gluck with a $45.7 million low-interest mortgage to purchase the facility, and Gluck would be allowed to raise rents—although in a more measured way (still doubling them). The expiration of the Mitchell-Lama credits would also be extended from 2024 to 2040. As of 2010, Stellar Management owned 24,000 apartments in New York, Chicago, Washington, and San Francisco.

== Personal life and death ==
Laurence Gluck was married to Sandra Gluck; they had three daughters: Amanda, Dana, and Heather. Laurence Gluck died from amyotrophic lateral sclerosis on June 13, 2024, at the age of 71. He was first diagnosed in 2013.
