= List of United States post offices in North Carolina =

United States post offices operate under the authority of the United States Post Office Department (1792–1971) or the United States Postal Service (since 1971). Historically, post offices were usually placed in a prominent location. Many were architecturally distinctive, including notable buildings featuring Beaux-Arts, Art Deco, and Vernacular architecture. However, modern U.S. post offices were generally designed for functionality rather than architectural style.

Following is a list of United States post offices in North Carolina. Notable post offices include individual buildings, whether still in service or not, which have architectural, historical, or community-related significance. Many of these are listed on the National Register of Historic Places (NRHP) or state and local historic registers.

Post office	City	Date built	Image	Architect	Notes	Ref.
United States Post Office (Beaufort, North Carolina)	Beaufort	1938			(Note: Houses the murals Criss Wright, Goose Decoys, Mail to Cape Lookout, and Sand Ponies by Simka Simkhovitch.)	
United States Post Office (Belmont, North Carolina), now Belmont City Hall	Belmont	1939–1940		Louis A. Simon	(Note: List on the National Register of Historic Places) (Note: Houses the mural Mayor Chronicle’s South Fork Boys by Peter DeAnna.) (Note: No longer used as a post office.)	
United States Post Office (Boone, North Carolina)	Boone	1938–1939		Louis A. Simon	(Note: Houses New Deal artwork)	
United States Post Office (Brevard, North Carolina), later Transylvania County Library	Brevard	1940-1941				
United States Post Office (Burlington, North Carolina)	Burlington	1936		R. Stanley Brown, Louis A. Simon		
United States Post Office (Canton, North Carolina)	Canton	1939				
Franklin Street Station Post Office	Chapel Hill	1937				
J. Herbert W. Small Federal Building and U.S. Courthouse	Elizabeth City	1904–1906		James Knox Taylor		
United States Post Office (Eden, North Carolina)	Eden	1939		Louis A. Simon, Neal A. Melick		
United States Post Office (Fayetteville, North Carolina)	Fayetteville	1909–1911				
United States Post Office (Franklin, North Carolina)	Franklin	1935		Louis A. Simon, Neal A. Melick		
United States Post Office (Gastonia, North Carolina)	Gastonia	1935			(Note: Houses the mural Cotton Field and Spinning Mill by Francis Speight.)	
United States Post Office (Greenville, North Carolina)	Greenville	1913–1914		Oscar Wenderoth		
Grimshawes Post Office, aka Whiteside Cove Post Office	Whiteside Cove	c. 1878		unknown	(Note: Was the smallest U.S. Post office from 1878 until 1953.)	
United States Post Office (Hamlet, North Carolina)	Hamlet	1941			(Note: Houses the carved mahogany bas relief sculptures Dewberries, Drilling, and Peaces by Nina de Brennecke.)	
United States Post Office (Lincolnton, North Carolina)	Lincolnton	1937				
United States Post Office (Louisburg, North Carolina)	Louisburg	1937				
Pink Plemmons Store and Post Office	Luck	c. 1930				
United States Post Office (Lumberton, North Carolina)	Lumberton	1931	Lumberton, NC former post office from W 1	James A. Wetmore		
United States Post Office (Madison, North Carolina)	Madison	1940				
United States Post Office, now McDowell County Library	Marion	1936				
Cana Store and Post Office	Mocksville	1875		James Harrison Cain		
United States Post Office (Monroe, North Carolina)	Monroe	1913		Oscar Wenderoth		
United States Post Office (Mount Olive, North Carolina)	Mount Olive	1931–1933		James A. Wetmore		
United States Post Office and Courthouse (New Bern, North Carolina)	New Bern	1935		Robert F. Smallwood		
United States Post Office (Newton, North Carolina), now Old Post Office Playhouse	Newton	1937				
United States Post Office (Red Springs, North Carolina)	Red Springs	1939			(Note: Houses the murals Battle of Little Raft Swamp, Coming of the Scots, and Peace–Work and Knowledge by John W. de Groot.)	
Reidsville City Hall (Old Post Office)	Reidsville	1936		Louis F. Voorhees		
United States Post Office and Federal Building (Rockingham, North Carolina)	Rockingham	1935–1936		Louis A. Simon		
United States Post Office (Roxboro, North Carolina)	Roxboro	1936–1937				
Salvo Post Office	Salvo	1910		Lafayette Douglas	(Note: The second-smallest post office building in the nation.)	
United States Post Office (Siler City, North Carolina)	Siler City	1940			(Note: Houses the mural Building the First House at Siler’s Crossroads by Maxwell B. Starr.)	
Former United States Post Office (Smithfield, North Carolina)	Smithfield	1936		Louis A. Simon		
United States Post Office (Southern Pines, North Carolina)	Southern Pines	1938			(Note: Houses Southern Pines Idyll mural painted by Joseph Presser.)	
United States Post Office and County Courthouse (Statesville, North Carolina)	Statesville	1891		Willoughby J. Edbrooke		
United States Post Office (Wadesboro, North Carolina)	Wadesboro	1932–1933		James A. Wetmore		
United States Post Office (Warrenton, North Carolina)	Warrenton	1937				
Former US Post Office Building (Waynesville, North Carolina), now Waynesville Municipal Building	Waynesville	1917		James A. Wetmore		
United States Post Office (Weldon, North Carolina)	Weldon	1939				
United States Post Office (Williamston, North Carolina)	Williamston	1938			(Note: Houses the mural First Flight of the Wright Brothers at Kitty Hawk by Phillip Von Saltza.) (Note: Contributing structure to the Williamston Commercial Historic District.)	
