= List of United States post offices in Mississippi =

United States post offices operate under the authority of the United States Post Office Department (1792–1971) or the United States Postal Service (since 1971). Historically, post offices were usually placed in a prominent location. Many were architecturally distinctive, including notable buildings featuring Beaux-Arts, Art Deco, and Vernacular architecture. However, modern U.S. post offices were generally designed for functionality rather than architectural style.

Following is a list of United States post offices in Mississippi. Notable post offices include individual buildings, whether still in service or not, which have architectural, historical, or community-related significance. Many of these are listed on the National Register of Historic Places (NRHP) or state and local historic registers. There is also a NRHP thematic listing, "Mississippi Post Offices 1931-1941 TR".

Post office	City	Date built	Image	Architect	Notes	Ref.
United States Courthouse and Post Office (Aberdeen, Mississippi)	Aberdeen	1885		William Alfred Freret and Mifflin E. Bell	(Note: Listed on the National Register of Historic Places)	
United States Post Office-Amory	Amory	1939		Louis A. Simon	(Note: Houses a New Deal mural, Amory, Mississippi...1889 by John McCrady.) (Note: A contributing structure to the National Register of Historic Places "Mississippi Post Offices 1931-1941 Thematic Resources".)	
United States Post Office (Batesville, Mississippi)	Batesville	1940		Louis A. Simon, Neal A. Melick	(Note: Originally housed a New Deal artwork, which has been relocated.) (Note: No longer used as a post office.)	
United States Post Office (Bay St. Louis, Mississippi)	Bay St. Louis	1935–1936		Louis A. Simon	(Note: Contributing structure to the Old Bay St. Louis Historic District.)	
United States Post Office (Belzoni, Mississippi)	Belzoni	1937–1938		Louis A. Simon	(Note: Built using a standardized architectural design also used for post offices in Hodgenville, Kentucky; Wareham, Massachusetts; Delhi, New York; and Emporia, Virginia.)	
United States Post Office, Courthouse, and Customhouse, now Biloxi City Hall	Biloxi	1908		James Knox Taylor		
United States Post Office (Booneville, Mississippi), now Chancery Clerk's Office	Booneville	1939		Leroy Barton	(Note: Houses a New Deal mural, Scenic and Historic Booneville by Stefan Hirsch.)	
United States Post Office (Brookhaven, Mississippi)	Brookhaven	1912		James Knox Taylor, Louis A. Simon		
United States Post Office (Carthage, Mississippi)	Carthage	1939		Shelby Olvy Yarborough	(Note: Houses a New Deal wood sculpture, Lumbermen Rolling a Log, by Peter Dalton.)	
United States Post Office (Charleston, Mississippi)	Charleston	1938–1939		Louis A. Simon		
United States Post Office (Cleveland, Mississippi), now the Cleveland Police Department	Cleveland	1933–1934		James A. Wetmore, Louis A. Simon		
United States Post Office (Columbia, Mississippi)	Columbia	1931		Shourds & Bean		
United States Post Office (Columbus, Mississippi), now Downtown Station Post Office	Columbus	1939		R. Stanley Brown, Murphy Pound	(Note: Houses a New Deal mural, Out of the Soil, by Beulah Bettersworth.)	
Old United States Post Office (Corinth, Mississippi)	Corinth	1913		James Knox Taylor		
United States Post Office (Crystal Springs, Mississippi)	Crystal Springs	1940–1941		Louis A. Simon	(Note: Houses a New Deal mural, Harvest, by Henry L. Cagnina.)	
United States Post Office (Durant, Mississippi)	Durant	1939–1940		Louis A. Simon	(Note: Houses the New Deal mural Erosion, Reclamation, and Conservation of the Soil by Isidore Teberoff.) (Note: Has the same design as the post office in Leland, Mississippi.)	
United States Post Office (Eupora, Mississippi)	Eupora	1940–1941		Louis A. Simon	(Note: Houses a New Deal artwork, Cotton Farm, by Tom Savage.) (Note: Contributing structure to the Eupora Historic District.)	
United States Post Office (Forest, Mississippi)	Forest	1938–1939		Louis A. Simon	(Note: Houses the New Deal mural Forest Loggers by Julien Binford.) (Note: Was built using a standardized design also used for the Crystal Springs and Hazlehurst, Mississippi post offices.)	
Old United States Post Office (Greenwood, Mississippi), now Greenwood Public Schools Administration Building	Greenwood	1911–1914		James Knox Taylor, Oscar Wenderoth	(Note: Designated a Mississippi Landmark.) (Note: Contributing structure to the Downtown Greenwood Historic District and the Central Commercial and Railroad Historic District.)	
Old United States Post Office (Grenada, Mississippi)	Grenada	1914–1915		Oscar Wenderoth		
United States Post Office and Customhouse (Gulfport, Mississippi)	Gulfport	1910		James Knox Taylor		
United States Post Office (Hattiesburg, Mississippi)	Hattiesburg	1934		Juan G. Landry, Rathbone DeBuys		
United States Post Office (Hazlehurst, Mississippi)	Hazlehurst	1938		Louis A. Simon, Neal A. Melick	(Note: Houses the New Deal mural, Life in Mississippi Cotton Belt by Auriel Bessemer.)	
United States Post Office (Houston, Mississippi)	Houston	1939		Louis A. Simon, Neal A. Melick	(Note: Houses the New Deal mural Post Near Houston, Natchez Trace, 1803 by Byron Burford Jr.)	
United States Post Office (Indianola, Mississippi)	Indianola	1935		Louis A. Simon, Neal A. Melick	(Note: Originally housed a New Deal mural White Gold in the Delta by Beulah Bettersworth, which was destroyed in the 1960s.)	
United States Courthouse and Post Office, Jackson, Mississippi	Jackson	1884–1885, 1900		Mifflin E. Bell, James Knox Taylor	(Note: Demolished for the construction of the U.S. Post Office and Courthouse, now James O. Eastland Federal Courthouse, in 1933.)	
United States Post Office and Courthouse, now James O. Eastland Federal Courthouse	Jackson	1933–1934		James A. Wetmore, Hull & Malvaney	(Note: Contributing structure to the Smith Park Architectural District.)	
Old U.S. Post Office (Kosciusko, Mississippi), now Kosciusko City Hall	Kosciusko	1932		James A. Wetmore	(Note: Has the same design as the U.S. Post Office in Cheboygan, Michigan.)	
United States Post Office (Leland, Mississippi)	Leland	1938		Louis A. Simon, Neal A. Melick	(Note: Houses the New Deal mural Ginnin' Cotton by Stuart R. Purser.)	
United States Post Office (Lexington, Mississippi)	Lexington	1937		Louis A. Simon		
United States Post Office (Louisville, Mississippi)	Louisville	1935		Louis A. Simon	(Note: Houses the New Deal mural Crossroads, Mississippi by Karl Wolfe.) (Note: Contributing structure in the Downtown Louisville Historic District (Mississippi).)	
United States Post Office (Lumberton, Mississippi)	Lumberton	1932		Algernon Blair-Montgomery		
United States Post Office (Macon, Mississippi)	Macon	1941		Louis A. Simon	(Note: Houses a New Deal mural, Signing of the Treaty of Dancing Rabbit, by Douglas Crockwell.)	
United States Post Office (Magnolia, Mississippi)	Magnolia	1936–1937		Louis A. Simon, Neal A. Melick	(Note: Houses the New Deal murals Magnolia, 1880, Cotton Harvest, and July 4th Celebration by John H. Fyfe.)	
Old United States Post Office (McComb, Mississippi), later McComb Public Library	McComb	1917–1918		James A. Wetmore	(Note: Constructed from a standardized architectural plan, also used in Mena, Arkansas; Fort Morgan, Colorado; Bartow, Florida; Lakeland, Florida; Barnesville, Georgia; Hiawatha, Kansas; Hammond, Louisiana; Beeville, Texas; and Pulaski, Virginia.)	
United States Post Office and Courthouse (Meridian, Mississippi)	Meridan	1931–1933		P. J. Krouse and Frank Fort, James A. Wetmore		
Old U.S. Post Office (Natchez, Mississippi), now Natchez Museum of African American History and Culture	Natchez	1905		James Knox Taylor	(Note: Contributing structure to the Natchez On-Top-of-the-Hill Historic District.)	
United States Post Office (New Albany, Mississippi), now Union County Development Association Building	New Albany	1936		Louis A. Simon, Neal A. Melick	(Note: House the New Deal mural Milking Time by Robert Cleaver Purdy.)	
United States Post Office (Newton, Mississippi)	Newton	1936		Louis A. Simon, Neal A. Melick	(Note: Houses the New Deal mural, Economic Life in Newton in Early '40's by Mary Boggs and Franklin Boggs.)	
United States Post Office (Okolona, Mississippi)	Okolona	1937		Louis A. Simon, Neal A. Melick	(Note: Originally housed the now destroyed New Deal mural The Richness of the Soil, by Harold Egan.)	
United States Post Office and Federal Building, now Oxford City Hall	Oxford	1883–1886		Mifflin E. Bell	(Note: Contributing structure to the Oxford Courthouse Square Historic District.)	
Old United States Post Office (Philadelphia, Mississippi), now Philadelphia Police Department	Philadelphia	1933–1935		Louis A. Simon, Neal A. Melick		
United States Post Office (Picayune, Mississippi)	Picayune	1937–1937		Louis A. Simon	(Note: Houses the New Deal mural, Lumber Region of Mississippi by Donald H. Robertson.)	
United States Post Office (Pontoto, Mississippi)	Pontotoc	1933		Louis A. Simon	(Note: Houses a New Deal mural by Joseph Pollet.) (Note: Contributing structure to the Pontotoc Historic District.)	
United States Post Office (Poplarville, Mississippi)	Poplarville	1941		Louis A. Simon		
Old U.S. Post Office (Ripley, Mississippi)	Ripley	1938		Louis A. Simon	(Note: Originally housed New Deal bas relief sculpture Development of the Postal Service by George Aarons, which were later movedto the new post office building.)	
United States Post Office (Starkville, Mississippi)	Starkville	1935		Louis A. Simon		
United States Post Office (Tylertown, Mississippi)	Tylertown	1940		Louis A. Simon, Neal A. Melick	(Note: Houses the New Deal mural Rural Mississippi–From Early Days to Present by Lucile Blanch.)	
United States Post Office (Waynesboro, Mississippi)	Waynesboro	1939		Louis A. Simon	(Note: Houses the New Deal mural Waynesboro Landscape by Ross E. Braught.)	
United States Post Office (Water Valley, Mississippi)	Water Valley	1925		James A. Wetmore		
Old United States Post Office (West Point, Mississippi), now West Point Water and Light	West Point	1910		James Knox Taylor	(Note: Contributing structure of the NRHP's West Point Central City Historic District.) (Note: Constructed using a standardized architectural plan that was also used in Greenville, Mississippi (now demolished); Palatka, Florida; Arkansas City, Kansas; Chanute, Kansas; and High Point, North Carolina.)	
United States Post Office (Winona, Mississippi)	Winona	1932		James A. Wetmore		
