= List of United States post offices in Maine =

United States post offices operate under the authority of the United States Post Office Department (1792–1971) or the United States Postal Service (since 1971). Historically, post offices were usually placed in a prominent location. Many were architecturally distinctive, including notable buildings featuring Beaux-Arts, Art Deco, and Vernacular architecture. However, modern U.S. post offices were generally designed for functionality rather than architectural style.

Following is a list of United States post offices in Maine. Notable post offices include individual buildings, whether still in service or not, which have architectural, historical, or community-related significance. Many of these are listed on the National Register of Historic Places (NRHP) or state and local historic registers.

Post office	City	Date built	Image	Architect	Notes	Ref.
Old Post Office (Augusta, Maine)	Augusta	1886–1890		Mifflin E. Bell	(Note: Listed on the National Register of Historic Places)	
U.S. Post Office-Bar Harbor Main	Bar Harbor	1909		James Knox Taylor		
United States Customhouse and Post Office (Bath, Maine)	Bath	1858		Ammi B. Young		
Old Post Office (Biddeford, Maine)	Biddeford	1914		James Knox Taylor		
Bustins Island Post Office	Casco Bay					
United States Post Office (Camden, Maine)	Camden	1913		Oscar Wenderoth		
U.S. Post Office (Dexter, Maine)	Dexter	1939–1940		Louis A. Simon, Neal A. Melick	(Note: Includes New Deal artiwork.)	
U.S. Post Office (Dover-Foxcroft, Maine)	Dover-Foxcroft	1937–1938		Louis A. Simon, Neal A. Melick		
East Blue Hill Post Office	East Blue Hill	1884		George F. Long		
U.S. Post Office (Ellsworth, Maine), now Emmaus Center	Ellsworth	1935–1936		Louis A. Simon, Neal A. Melick	(Note: No longer an active post office.)	
U.S. Post Office (Fairfield, Maine)	Fairfield	1936–1938		Louis A. Simon, Neal A. Melick		
U.S. Post Office (Farmington, Maine)	Farmington	1935–1936		Louis A. Simon, Neal A. Melick		
U.S. Office (Fort Kent, Maine)	Fort Kent	1941–1942		Louis A. Simon, Neal A. Melick		
U.S. Post Office (Houlton, Maine)	Houlton	1934		Louis A. Simon, George O. Von Nerta		
U.S. Police Station (Kennebunk, Maine)	Kennebunk	1937		Louis A. Simon, Neal A. Melick		
U.S. Post Office (Kennebunkport, Maine)	Kennebunkport	1940		Louis A. Simon, Neal A. Melick		
Lewiston Main Post Office	Lewiston	1933		James A. Wetmore		
Old Post Office (Liberty, Maine)	Liberty	1870		Rufus A. Carter		
Machias Post Office and Customhouse	Machias	1872		Alfred B. Mullett		
U.S. Post Office (Millinocket, Maine)	Millinocket	1936–1937		Louis A. Simon, Neal A. Melick		
U.S. Post Office (Norway, Maine)	Norway	1940–1941		Louis A. Simon, Neal A. Melick		
Old Town Main Post Office	Old Town	1912		Oscar Wenderoth		
Orono Post Office	Orono	1933		Louis A. Simon		
Old Post Office (Portland, Maine)	Portland	1868		Alfred B. Mullett	(Note: The building was demolished.)	
U.S. Post Office-Portland Maine	Portland	1932		John Calvin Stevens, John Howard Stevens		
U.S. Post Office-Presque Isle Maine	Presque Isle	1932		James A. Wetmore and Alonzo J. Harriman Associates		
U.S. Post Office-Sanford Maine	Sanford	1932		John P. Thomas		
U.S. Post Office (South Portland, Maine)	South Portland	1937–1939				
Squirrel Island Post Office	Squirrel Island					
U.S. Customhouse and Post Office (Waldoboro, Maine)	Waldoboro	1855–1857		Ammi B. Young		
Old Waterville Post Office	Waterville	1911		James Knox Taylor		
U.S. Post Office (Westbrook, Maine)	Westbrook	1935–1936		Louis A. Simon, Neal A. Melick		
United States Customhouse and Post Office (Wiscasset, Maine)	Wiscasset	1869–1870		Alfred B. Mullett		
