= List of United States post offices in Maryland =

United States post offices operate under the authority of the United States Post Office Department (1792–1971) or the United States Postal Service (since 1971). Historically, post offices were usually placed in a prominent location. Many were architecturally distinctive, including notable buildings featuring Beaux-Arts, Art Deco, and Vernacular architecture. However, modern U.S. post offices were generally designed for functionality rather than architectural style.

Following is a list of United States post offices in Maryland. Notable post offices include individual buildings, whether still in service or not, which have architectural, historical, or community-related significance. Many of these are listed on the National Register of Historic Places (NRHP) or state and local historic registers.

| Post office | City | Date built | Image | Architect | Notes | Ref. |
|---|---|---|---|---|---|---|
| United States Post Office (Aberdeen, Maryland) | Aberdeen | 1937 | | | | |
| United States Post Office and Courthouse (Baltimore, Maryland) | Baltimore | 1930 | | James A. Wetmore | (Note: Listed on the National Register of Historic Places.) | |
| United States Post Office (Bel Air, Maryland) | Bel Air | 1938 | | Louis A. Simon, Neal A. Melick | (Note: No longer used as a post office.) | |
| United States Post Office (Bethesda, Maryland) | Bethesda | 1937 | | Louis A. Simon, Neal A. Melick | (Note: Originally housed a New Deal mural, moved to the Bethesda-Chevy Chase Regional Services Center in 2013.) | |
| United States Post Office (Catonsville, Maryland) | Catonsville | 1940 | | | (Note: Houses a New Deal artwork.) | |
| Old Post Office, now Public Safety Building (Cumberland, Maryland) | Cumberland | 1902 | | James Knox Taylor | | |
| United States Post Office (Dundalk, Maryland) | Dundalk | 1940 | | Louis A. Simon, Neal A. Melick | | |
| United States Post Office (Easton, Maryland) | Easton | 1936 | | | | |
| United States Post Office (Elkton, Maryland) | Elkton | 1939 | | Louis A. Simon, Neal A. Melick | | |
| United States Post Office (Ellicott City, Maryland) | Ellicott City | 1940 | | | | |
| Waters–Fulton Store and Post Office | Fulton | 1860s | | Richard Waters | | |
| United States Post Office (Hagerstown, Maryland) | Hagerstown | 1935 | | Louis A. Simon, Neal A. Melick, Mottu & White | | |
| United States Post Office and Courthouse–Havre Main | Havre de Grace | 1936 | | Louis A. Simon, Neal A. Melick | | |
| United States Post Office–Hyattsville Main | Hyattsville | 1935 | | James A. Wetmore, Louis A. Simon | | |
| United States Post Office (Oakland, Maryland) | Oakland | 1940 | | | (Note: Houses the New Deal mural, Buckwheat Harvest, by Robert Gates.) | |
| United States Post Office (Pocomoke City, Maryland) | Pocomoke City | 1937 | | Louis A. Simon, Neal A. Melick | | |
| Glen Store and Post Office | Potomac | c, 1899 | | George Fountain Peters | | |
| United States Post Office (Rockville, Maryland), now Rockville Police Station | Rockville | 1938–1939 | | Louis A. Simon, Neal A. Melick, R. Stanley-Brown | | |
| United States Post Office, now Maude R. Toulson Federal Building | Salisbury | 1924 | | James A. Wetmore, Louis A. Simon | (Note: Houses three New Deal murals by Jacob Getlar: The Stage at Byrd’s Tavern, The Cotton Patch, and Salisbury Town.) | |
| United States Post Office (Silver Spring, Maryland) | Silver Spring | 1936–1937 | | Louis A. Simon, Neal A. Melick | (Note: Originally housed the New Deal mural The Old Tavern by Nicolai Cikovsky. The mural was removed when the USPS vacated the building in 1981 and is now displayed in the Silver Spring Library.) | |
| United States Post Office Towson Branch | Towson | 1936–1937 | | Louis A. Simon, Neal A. Melick | | |
| United States Post Office (Upper Marlboro, Maryland), now Upper Marlboro Library Branch | Upper Marlboro | 1936 | | Louis A. Simon, Neal A. Melick | (Note: Houses the New Deal mural Tobacco Cutters by Mitchell Jamieson.) | |
