= List of United States post offices in Minnesota =

United States post offices operate under the authority of the United States Post Office Department (1792–1971) or the United States Postal Service (since 1971). Historically, post offices were usually placed in a prominent location. Many were architecturally distinctive, including notable buildings featuring Beaux-Arts, Art Deco, and Vernacular architecture. However, modern U.S. post offices were generally designed for functionality rather than architectural style.

Following is a list of United States post offices in Minnesota. Notable post offices include individual buildings, whether still in service or not, which have architectural, historical, or community-related significance. Many of these are listed on the National Register of Historic Places (NRHP) or state and local historic registers.

Post office	City	Date built	Image	Architect	Notes	Ref.
United States Post Office (Ada, Minnesota)	Ada	1940–1941			(Note: Listed on the National Register of Historic Places)	
United States Post Office (Albert Lea, Minnesota)	Albert Lea	1935–1937		Louis A. Simon, Neal A. Melick, Le Roy Gaarder		
U.S. Post Office-Alexandria	Alexandria	1910		Earl & Aiton		
Anoka Post Office	Anoka	1916		James Knox Taylor		
United States Post Office (Breckenridge, Minnesota)	Breckenridge	1937			(Note: Houses New Deal artwork.)	
United States Post Office (Caledonia, Minnesota)	Caledonia	1939				
United States Post Office (Cambridge, Minnesota)	Cambridge	1938–1939				
United States Post Office (Chisholm, Minnesota)	Chisholm	1939–1940				
United States Post Office (Cloquet, Minnesota)	Cloquet	1935		Louis A. Simon, Neal A. Melick		
United States Post Office (Detroit Lakes), now Detroit Lakes Public Schools District Office	Detroit Lakes	1934			(Note: No longer used as a post office.)	
United States Post Office (East Grand Fork, Minnesota)	East Grand Forks	1937–1938				
United States Post Office (Ely, Minnesota)	Ely	1936–1938		Louis A. Simon, Neal A. Melick, Harry B. Carter		
United States Post Office (Eveleth, Minnesota)	Eveleth	1935–1936				
Old United States Post Office (Fairmont, Minnesota)	Fairmont	1926		James A. Wetmore		
United States Post Office and Courthouse, now Edward J. Devitt U.S. Courthouse and Federal Building	Fergus Falls	1904		James Knox Taylor		
United States Post Office (Grand Rapids, Minnesota)	Grand Rapids	1937–1938				
United States Post Office (Hastings, Minnesota)	Hastings	1936–1937		Louis A. Simon, Neal A. Melick		
United States Post Office (Hibbing, Minnesota)	Hibbing	1935				
Howard Lake City Hall	Howard Lake	1904–1905		I. A Hancock		
United States Post Office (Hutchinson, Minnesota)	Hutchinson	1940		Louis A. Simon, Neal A. Melick		
United States Post Office (International Falls, Minnesota)	International Falls	1934–1935				
United States Post Office (Litchfield, Minnesota)	Litchfield	1934–1935				
United States Post Office (Long Prairie, Minnesota)	Long Prairie	1937–1938				
Federal Courthouse and Post Office (Mankato, Minnesota)	Mankato	1896		James A. Wetmore		
United States Post Office (Marshall, Minnesota)	Marshall	1936		Louis A. Simon		
United States Post Office (Minneapolis, Minnesota)	Minneapolis	1912–1915		James Knox Taylor		
Main Post Office – Minneapolis, now Martin Olav Sabo Post Office	Minneapolis	1933		James A. Wetmore, Magney and Tusler Inc., Léon Eugène Arnal	(Note: Contributing property to St. Anthony Falls Historic District.)	
Federal Courthouse and Post Office (Moorhead, Minnesota), now Rourke Art Museum	Moorhead	1915		Oscar Wenderoth		
United States Post Office (Morris, Minnesota)	Morris	1937–1938				
New Ulm Post Office, now Brown County Museum	New Ulm	1909		James Knox Taylor		
United States Post Office (North St. Paul, Minnesota)	North St. Paul	1938–1939		Louis A. Simon, Neal A. Melick		
United States Post Office (Northfield, Minnesota)	Northfield	1936				
United States Post Office (Park Rapids, Minnesota)	Park Rapids	1938–1939		Louis A. Simon, Neal A. Melick		
United States Post Office (Pipestone, Minnesota)	Pipestone	1935–1936		Edmund J. Prondzinski, Louis A. Simon, Neal A. Melick		
Old United States Post Office (St. Cloud, Minnesota)	St. Cloud	1936–1938		Rudolph Stanley-Brown		
United States Post Office (St. James, Minnesota)	St. James	1937–1938				
Old Federal Courts Building, now Landmark Center	Saint Paul	1894–1901		Willoughby J. Edbrooke		
United States Post Office and Custom House, later Eugene McCarthy Post Office	Saint Paul	1934, 1939, 1961		James A. Wetmore, Lambert Bassindale, Holabird & Root; Louis A. Simon; Ellerbe and Company		
United States Post Office (Sauk Centre, Minnesota)	Sauk Centre	1940–1941				
United States Post Office (Spring Valley, Minnesota)	Spring Valley	1939–1940				
United States Post Office (Thief River Falls, Minnesota)	Thief River Falls	1935–1936		A. F. and Ray R. Gauger		
United States Post Office (Wabasha, Minnesota)	Wabasha	1937–1938		Louis A. Simon, Neal A. Melick		
United States Post Office (Wadena, Minnesota)	Wadena	1934–1935				
United States Post Office (Waseca, Minnesota)	Waseca	1936–1937				
United States Post Office (Wayzata, Minnesota)	Wayzata	1941–1942				
United States Post Office (Windom, Minnesota)	Windom	1939				
United States Post Office (Worthington, Minnesota), now Worthington Professional Building	Worthington	1934		Louis A. Simon, George O. Von Nerta		
