= List of United States post offices in Oklahoma =

United States post offices operate under the authority of the United States Post Office Department (1792–1971) or the United States Postal Service (since 1971). Historically, post offices were usually placed in a prominent location. Many were architecturally distinctive, including notable buildings featuring Beaux-Arts, Art Deco, and Vernacular architecture. However, modern U.S. post offices were generally designed for functionality rather than architectural style.

Following is a list of United States post offices in Oklahoma. Notable post offices include individual buildings, whether still in service or not, which have architectural, historical, or community-related significance. Many of these are listed on the National Register of Historic Places (NRHP) or state and local historic registers.

Post office	City	Date built	Image	Architect	Notes	Ref.
U.S. Post Office and Courthouse – Ada, Oklahoma	Ada	1933–1934				
United States Post Office (Alva, Oklahoma)	Alva	1936				
United States Post Office (Anadarko, Oklahoma)	Anadarko	1936				
United States Post Office (Bristow, Oklahoma)	Bristow	1936				
United States Post Office and Courthouse (Chickasha, Oklahoma)	Chickasha	1914–1915		Oscar Wenderoth	(Note: Listed on the National Register of Historic Places)	
United States Post Office (Claremore, Oklahoma)	Claremore	1935			(Note: No longer used as a post office.)	
United States Post Office (Coalgate, Oklahoma)	Coalgate	1941		Louis A. Simon		
United States Post Office (Cordell, Oklahoma)	Cordell	1937				
United States Post Office (Cushing, Oklahoma)	Cushing	1935				
United States Post Office (Drumright, Oklahoma)	Drumright	1940				
Federal Building and Post Office	Duncan	1933–1934				
United States Post Office, now Edmond Municipal Court and Courthouse	Edmund	1938				
Federal Building and Post Office, now Elk City Board of Education Building	Elk City	1936				
U.S. Post Office and Courthouse	Enid	1941				
United States Post Office (Eufaula, Oklahoma)	Eufaula	1939		Louis A. Simon, Neal A. Melick		
United States Post Office, later Guymon Public Library	Guymon	1937–1938		Louis A. Simon, Neal A. Melick		
United States Post Office, now Henryetta's Public Library.	Henryetta	1935				
United States Post Office (Holdenville, Oklahoma)	Holdenville	1935				
United States Post Office Hollis	Hollis	1940		Louis A. Simon		
Hugo Post Office, now Hugo School Administration Office	Hugo	1936		Louis A. Simon, George O. Von Nerta		
Kingfisher Post Office	Kingfisher	1912–1913		Dieter and Wenzil Co		
United States Post Office Madill	Madill	1938–1939		Louis A. Simon		
United States Post Office (Mangum, Oklahoma)	Mangum	1938				
United States Post Office (Marietta, Oklahoma)	Marietta	1940				
United States Post Office (Marlow, Oklahoma)	Marlow	1940				
United States Post Office and Courthouse, now Ed Edmondson United States Courthouse	Muskogee	1915		James Knox Taylor		
United States Post Office (Norman, Oklahoma)	Norman	1933		James A. Wetmore		
United States Post Office Nowata	Nowata	1938–1940		Louis A. Simon		
United States Post Office (Okemah, Oklahoma)	Okemah	1938				
United States Post Office, Courthouse, and Federal Office Building (Oklahoma City)	Oklahoma City	1912		James Knox Taylor		
United States Post Office (Pauls Valley, Oklahoma)	Pauls Valley	1935–1936				
United States Post Office (Pawhuska, Oklahoma)	Pawhuska	1937				
United States Post Office (Perry, Oklahoma)	Perry	1939		Louis A. Simon, Neal A. Melick		
Post Office and Courthouse – Ponca City, Oklahoma	Ponca City	1934		Louis A. Simon, Neal A. Melick		
United States Post Office (Poteau, Oklahoma)	Poteau	1936–1937		Louis A. Simon, Neal A. Melick		
United States Post Office Purcell	Purcell	1938–1939		Louis A. Simon, Neal A. Melick		
United States Post Office (Sayre, Oklahoma)	Sayre	1938–1939		Louis A. Simon, Neal A. Melick		
United States Post Office (Seminole, Oklahoma)	Seminole	1936–1937		Louis A. Simon, Neal A. Melick, Bertram E. Giesecke		
United States Post Office (Stilwell, Oklahoma)	Stilwell	1940		Louis A. Simon, Neal A. Melick		
United States Post Office (Sulphur, Oklahoma)	Sulphur	1937				
United States Post Office (Tahlequah, Oklahoma)	Tahlequah	1937				
United States Post Office and Courthouse (Tulsa, Oklahoma)	Tulsa	1917		James A. Wetmore		
United States Post Office (Vinita, Oklahoma)	Vinita	1938–1939				
United States Post Office (Watonga, Oklahoma)	Watonga	1937		Louis A. Simon, Neal A. Melick		
United States Post Office Watonga	Waurika	1937		Louis A. Simon		
United States Post Office (Weatherford, Oklahoma)	Weatherford	1937–1938		Louis A. Simon, Neal A. Melick		
United States Post Office (Wewoka, Oklahoma)	Wewoka	1935		Louis A. Simon, Neal A. Melick		
Woodward Federal Courthouse and Post Office	Woodward	1921		James A. Wetmore		
United States Post Office (Yukon, Oklahoma)	Yukon	1939–1940				
