= List of United States post offices in Oregon =

United States post offices operate under the authority of the United States Post Office Department (1792–1971) or the United States Postal Service (since 1971). Historically, post offices were usually placed in a prominent location. Many were architecturally distinctive, including notable buildings featuring Beaux-Arts, Art Deco, and Vernacular architecture. However, modern U.S. post offices were generally designed for functionality rather than architectural style.

Following is a list of United States post offices in Oregon. Notable post offices include individual buildings, whether still in service or not, which have architectural, historical, or community-related significance. Many of these are listed on the National Register of Historic Places (NRHP) or state and local historic registers.

Post office	City	Date built	Oregon	Architect	Notes	Ref.
United States Post Office (Agness, Oregon)	Agness	1897		unknown		
United States Post Office (Astoria, Oregon)	Astoria	1933		James A. Wetmore	(Note: Listed on the National Register of Historic Places.)	
Old U.S. Post Office (Bend, Oregon)	Bend	1932		James A. Wetmore	(Note: No longer used as a post office.)	
United States Post Office (Burns, Oregon)	Burns	1939		Louis A. Simon, Neal A. Melick	(Note: Originally housed a New Deal artwork, which was relocated to the Harney County Courthouse when the post office closed in the 1990s.)	
Marshfield Post Office, now Coos Art Museum	Coos Bay	1936				
United States Post Office (The Dalles, Oregon)	The Dalles	1915		Oscar Wenderoth		
United States Post Office (Eugene, Oregon)	Eugene	1938–1939		Gilbert Stanley Underwood	(Note: Houses two New Deal murals by Carl Morris.)	
United States Post Office (Grants Pass, Oregon)	Grants Pass	1935–1936		Harry B. Carter	(Note: Houses two New Deal murals: Early and Contemporary Industries by Eric Lamade and Rogue River Indiansby Louis DeMott Bunce.)	
United States Post Office (Gresham, Oregon)	Gresham	1941				
United States Post Office (Hillsboro, Oregon)	Hillsboro	1934–1935		Louis A. Simon, George O. Von Merta	(Note: This building has been demolished.)	
United States Post Office (Hood River, Oregon)	Hood River	1934-1935		Louis A. Simon, George O. Von Merta		
United States Post Office and Federal Building (La Grande, Oregon), now La Grande City Hall	La Grande	1913		James Knox Taylor		
United States Post Office (Lakeview, Oregon)	Lakeview	1938–1940		Louis A. Simon, Neal A. Melick		
Old United States Post Office, now Yamhill County Clerk Building	McMinnville	1935				
U.S. Post Office and Courthouse, now James A. Redden Federal Courthouse	Medford	1915–1916		Oscar Wenderoth		
United States Post Office (Newberg, Oregon)	Newberg	1935–1936			(Note: Houses the New Deal mural Early Mail Carriers of the West by Rockwell Carey.)	
United States Post Office (Ontario, Oregon)	Ontario	1936–1937			(Note: Houes the New Deal mural Trail to Oregon by Edmund J. Fitzgerald.)	
United States Post Office and Courthouse, now John F. Kilkenny United States Post Office and Courthouse	Pendleton	1916		Oscar Wenderoth		
East Portland Station Post Office	Portland	1937			(Note: Houses the New Deal mural Post Rider by Paul Grellert.)	
St. Johns Post Office (Portland, Oregon)	Portland	1933		Francis Marion Stokes, James A. Wetmore		
U.S. Post Office (Portland, Oregon), now 511 Federal Building	Portland	1916–1918		Lewis P. Hobart, James A. Wetmore		
Washington Park and Zoo Railway	Portland					
United States Post Office (Roseburg, Oregon)	Roseburg	1916		James A. Wetmore		
United States Post Office, now State of Oregon Executive Building	Salem	1936–1937			(Note: Houses the New Deal mural Builders of Salem by Andrew McDuffie Vincent.)	
United States Post Office (Scappoose, Oregon)	Scappoose	1966		Stanton, Boles, Maguire & Church		
U.S. Post Office (Tillamook, Oregon), now Tillamook City Hall	Tillamook	1941		Louis A. Simon	(Note: Houses the New Deal mural Captain Gray Entering Tillamook Bay by Lucia Wiley.)	
