= List of United States post offices in Texas =

United States post offices operate under the authority of the United States Post Office Department (1792–1971) or the United States Postal Service (since 1971). Historically, post offices were usually placed in a prominent location. Many were architecturally distinctive, including notable buildings featuring Beaux-Arts, Art Deco, and Vernacular architecture. However, modern U.S. post offices were generally designed for functionality rather than architectural style.

Following is a list of United States post offices in Texas. Notable post offices include individual buildings, whether still in service or not, which have architectural, historical, or community-related significance. Many of these are listed on the National Register of Historic Places (NRHP) or state and local historic registers.

Post office	City	Date built	Image	Architect	Notes	Ref.
Amarillo US Post Office and Courthouse, now J. Marvin Jones Federal Building and Mary Lou Robinson United States Courthouse	Amarillo	1937–1938		Wyatt C. Hedrick, Louis A. Simon, Neal A. Melick	(Note: Listed on the National Register of Historic Places.) (Note: No longer used as a post office.) (Note: Houses New Deal murals by Julius Woeltz.)	
Arlington Post Office	Arlington	1939–1941				
U.S. Post Office and Federal Building, now O. Henry Hall	Austin	1879		unknown		
Jack Brooks Federal Building, U.S. Post Office and Courthouse	Beaumont	1933–1934		Fred C. Stone, F. W. Steinman, and D. E. Steinman; H. M. Sanford	(Note: Contributing structure to the Beaumont Commercial District.)	
Beeville Post Office	Beeville	1917		James A. Wetmore		
U.S. Post Office and Federal Building, now Brenham Heritage Museum	Brenham	1915		James A. Wetmore		
Copperas Cove Stagestop and Post Office	Copperas Cove	1878		Marsden Ogletree		
U.S. Post Office (El Paso, Texas)	El Paso	1917		James A. Wetmore		
United States Post Office (Fort Worth, Texas)	Fort Worth	1931		Wyatt C. Hedrick		
Galveston United States Post Office and Courthouse	Galveston	1937		Alfred Finn		
Graham Post Office	Graham	1935–1936		Louis A. Simon	(Note: Houses the New Deal mural Oil Fields of Graham by Alexandre Hogue.)	
Post Office Building (Greenville, Texas)	Greenville	1910		James Knox Taylor		
U.S. Post Office (Hillsboro, Texas), now Hillsboro City Library	Hillsboro	1915		James Knox Taylor		
Downtown Houston Post Office, Processing and Distribution Center, aka Barbara Jordan Post Office	Houston	1962		Wilson, Morris, Crain, & Anderson		
Jacksonville Post Office, now Landmark Inn	Jacksonville	1933		James A. Wetmore		
Old United States Post Office and Courts Building (Jefferson, Texas)	Jefferson	1888–1890		William A. Ferret, James H. Caster		
Laredo United States Post Office, Court House and Custom House	Laredo	1907		James Knox Taylor		
Lubbock Post Office and Federal Building	Lubbock	1931		James A. Wetmore		
Marshall U.S. Post Office, now Sam B. Hall Jr. Federal Building and United States Courthouse	Marshall	1915		Oscar Wenderoth, George Shaul		
Old Post Office Building,(Nacogdoches, Texas), now Charles Bright Visitor Center	Nacogdoches	1918		James A. Wetmore		
United States Post Office (Palestine, Texas)	Palestine	1907, 1913		Deacon Armiger and Dunlop		
United States Post Office-Pampa Main	Pampa	1933–1934		DeWitt & Washburn; T. P. Lippincott		
United States Post Office and Federal Building (Port Arthur, Texas)	Port Arthur	1911		James Knox Taylor		
Silverio de la Pena Drugstore and Post Office	Rio Grande City	1886		Heinrich Portscheller		
O.C. Fisher Federal Building and U.S. Courthouse	San Angelo	1909–1911		James Knox Taylor		
US Post Office and Courthouse, now the Hipolito F. Garcia Federal Building and United States Courthouse	San Antonio	1935–1936		Ralph Haywood Cameron, Paul Philippe Cret, Louis A. Simon	(Note: Its lobby features a sixteen-panel New Deal fresco mural, San Antonio’s Importance in Texas History, by Howard Cook.) (Note: Contributing building to the Alamo Plaza Historic District.)	
Selma Stagecoach Stop and Post Office	Selma	1850		unknown		
Sherman US Post Office and Courthouse, now Paul Brown Federal Building and United States Courthouse	Sherman	1907		James Knox Taylor		
United States Post Office (Stamford, Texas)	Stamford	1917,		Louis A. Simon, James A. Wetmore		
United States Post Office (Texas City, Texas)	Texas City	1932		James A. Wetmore		
Tyler US Post Office and Courthouse, now William M. Steger Federal Building and United States Courthouse	Tyler	1933–1934		Shirley Simons, James A. Wetmore		
Old Federal Building and Post Office (Victoria, Texas)	Victoria					
