= List of United States post offices in territories =

United States post offices operate under the authority of the United States Post Office Department (1792–1971) or the United States Postal Service (since 1971). Historically, post offices were usually placed in a prominent location. Many were architecturally distinctive, including notable buildings featuring Beaux-Arts, Art Deco, and Vernacular architecture. However, modern U.S. post offices were generally designed for functionality rather than architectural style.

Following is a list of United States post offices in the territories of the United States. Notable post offices include individual buildings, whether still in service or not, which have architectural, historical, or community-related significance. Many of these are listed on the National Register of Historic Places (NRHP) or state and local historic registers.

== Puerto Rico ==
Post office	City	Date built	Image	Architect	Notes	Ref.
Miguel Angel García Méndez Post Office Building	Mayagüez	1935		Louis A. Simon, Neal A. Melick	(Note: Listed on the National Register of Historic Places) (Note: Houses the New Deal murals The Indian Mail System and Receipt of First Official Spanish Mail in the Island of Puerto Rico in 1541 by Jose A. Maduro.)	
Luis A. Ferré United States Courthouse and Post Office Building	Ponce	1933		James A. Wetmore	(Note: This was the first U.S. Post Office established in Puerto Rico.) (Note: No longer used as a post office.)	
U.S. Post Office and Courthouse, now Jose V. Toledo Federal Building and United States Courthouse	San Juan	1911–1914		James Knox Taylor, Louis A. Simon	(Note: Originally housed two New Deal wooden reliefs by Marguerite Blasingame, later moved to the Līhuʻe Carrier Annex.)	

== United States Virgin Islands ==
Post office	City	Date built	Image	Architect	Notes	Ref.
Alvardo de Lugo Post Office	Charlotte Amalie, St. Thomas	1937–1938		Louis A. Simon, Neal A. Melick	(Note: Houses the New Deal murals The Virgin Islands, U.S. – The Outer World Significance and The Virgin Islands, U.S. – The Leisurely Native Tempo by Stevan Dohanos.)	
