= List of United States post offices in Delaware =

United States post offices operate under the authority of the United States Post Office Department (1792–1971) or the United States Postal Service (since 1971). Historically, post offices were usually placed in a prominent location. Many were architecturally distinctive, including notable buildings featuring Beaux-Arts, Art Deco, and Vernacular architecture. However, modern U.S. post offices were generally designed for functionality rather than architectural style.

Following is a list of United States post offices in Delaware. Notable post offices include individual buildings, whether still in service or not, which have architectural, historical, or community-related significance. Many of these are listed on the National Register of Historic Places (NRHP) or state and local historic registers.

Post office	City	Date built	Image	Architect	Notes	Ref.
Old United States Post Office (Laurel, Delaware)	Laurel	1935		Louis A. Simon, Neal A. Melick	(Note: No longer used as a post office.)	
United States Post Office (Harrington, Delaware)	Harrington	1936–1937		Louis A. Simon, Neal A. Melick	(Note: Houses the New Deal mural Men Hoeing by Eve Salisbury.)	
Kenton Post Office	Kenton	1881		unknown	(Note: Listed on the National Register of Historic Places)	
Old Post Office (Kirkwood, Delaware)	Kirkwood	1870		unknown		
United States Post Office (New Castle, Delaware)	New Castle	1935–1936			(Note: Houses the New Deal mural William Penn Welcomed at New Castle by J. Scott Williams,)	
United States Post Office (Rehoboth Beach, Delaware)	Rehoboth Beach	1937–1938		Louis A. Simon, Neal A. Melick	(Note: Houses the New Deal mural Frontier Mai by Karl Knaths.)	
United States Post Office-Seaford, now Seaford Museum	Seaford	1935		Louis A. Simon, Neal A. Melick		
United States Post Office (Selbyville, Delaware)	Selbyville	1940			(Note: Houses the New Deal mural Chicken Farm by William H. Calfee.)	
Old Customshouse (Wilmington, Delaware)	Wilmington	1855		Ammi B. Young		
United States Post Office, Courthouse, and Customhouse (Wilmington, Delaware)	Wilmington	1937				
