= List of United States post offices in Alaska =

United States post offices operate under the authority of the United States Post Office Department (1792–1971) or the United States Postal Service (since 1971). Historically, post offices were usually placed in a prominent location and many were architecturally distinctive, including notable buildings featuring Beaux-Arts, Art Deco, and Vernacular architecture. However, modern U.S. post offices were generally designed for functionality rather than architectural style.

Following is a list of United States post offices in Alaska. Notable post offices include individual buildings, whether still in service or not, which have architectural, historical, or community-related significance. Many of these are listed on the National Register of Historic Places (NRHP) or state and local historic registers.

Post office	Location	Date built	Image	Architect	Notes	Ref.
U.S. Post Office, now Federal Building Anchorage	Anchorage	1939–1940		Gilbert Stanley Underwood, Louis A. Simon, Neal A. Melick	(Note: Listed on the National Register of Historic Places.) (Note: Houses the New Deal mural Alaskan Landscape by Arthur Kerrick.) (Note: No longer used as a post office.)	
Cooper Landing Post Office	Cooper Landing	1921		Jack Lean		
Cordova Post Office and Courthouse	Cordova	1924		James A. Wetmore	(Note: Oldest Federal building still in use in Alaska.)	
Steele Creek Roadhouse	Eagle	c. 1898		Unknown		
Woodchopper Roadhouse	Eagle	1910		Unknown		
Miller House Post Office	Fairbanks	1900				
Old Federal Building (Fairbanks, Alaska)	Fairbanks	1933		George N. Ray		
United States Post Office (Homer, Alaska)	Homer	1927		unknown		
Federal and Territorial Building, now Alaska State Capitol	Juneau	1929–1931		James A. Wetmore		
Ketchikan Federal Building	Ketchikan	1937–1938		Garfield, Stanley-Brown, Harris and Robinson; Louis A. Simon; Neal A. Melick		
United States Post Office and Courthouse	Nome	1938		Louis A. Simon		
Sitka United States Post Office and Court House, now Sitka City Hall	Sitka	1938		Gilbert Stanley Underwood		
Soldotna Post Office	Soldotna	1949		Sam Hoffman, Alfred Anderson		
United States Post Office and Customs House (Wrangell, Alaska)	Wrangell	1940–1942		Hendrick P. Maas	(Note: Houses the New Deal mural Old Town in Alaska by Austin Mecklem, Marianne Appel.)	
