= List of United States post offices in South Carolina =

United States post offices operate under the authority of the United States Post Office Department (1792–1971) or the United States Postal Service (since 1971). Historically, post offices were usually placed in a prominent location. Many were architecturally distinctive, including notable buildings featuring Beaux-Arts, Art Deco, and Vernacular architecture. However, modern U.S. post offices were generally designed for functionality rather than architectural style.

Following is a list of United States post offices in South Carolina. Notable post offices include individual buildings, whether still in service or not, which have architectural, historical, or community-related significance. Many of these are listed on the National Register of Historic Places (NRHP) or state and local historic registers.

| Post office | City | Date built | Image | Architect | Notes | Ref. |
|---|---|---|---|---|---|---|
| U.S. Post Office and Courthouse, now Sullivan-King Mortuary | Anderson | 1909 | | James Knox Taylor | (Note: Contributing structure to the Anderson Downtown Historic District (Anderson, South Carolina).) (Note: No longer used as a post office.) | |
| United States Post Office and Court House, now G. Ross Anderson Jr. Federal Building and Courthouse | Anderson | 1937–1938 | | Thomas Harlan Ellett | (Note: Listed on the National Register of Historic Places.) | |
| Bamberg Post Office | Bamberg | 1937–1938 | | Louis A. Simon | | |
| United States Post Office (Batesburg-Leesville, South Carolina) | Batesburg-Leesville | 1939 | | Louis A. Simon, Neal A. Melick | | |
| United States Post Office (Bishopville, South Carolina) | Bishopville | 1940 | | | | |
| United States Post Office and Courthouse (Charleston, South Carolina) | Charleston | 1896 | | John Henry Devereux | | |
| United States Post Office (Chesterfield, South Carolina) | Chesterfield | 1937–1938 | | Louis A. Simon | | |
| Old Clemson Post Office, now Mell Hall | Clemson | 1940 | | | | |
| United States Post Office (Easley, South Carolina) | Easley | 1940 | | Louis A. Simon, Neal A. Melick | | |
| United States Post Office (Florence, South Carolina) | Florence | 1906 | | | | |
| C.F. Haynsworth Federal Building and United States Courthouse | Greenville | 1936–1937 | | Eric Kebbon | | |
| United States Court House and Post Office, later the Greenville City Hall | Greenville | 1889 | | James H. Windrim | (Note: Previously listed on the National Register of Historic Palaces, but now demolished.) | |
| Federal Building (Greenwood, South Carolina), now Arts Center and Visitor Center | Greenwood | 1909–1910 | | | | |
| Greer Post Office, now Greer Heritage Museum | Greer | 1935 | | Donald G. Anderson, Louis A. Simon | | |
| Hartsville Post Office | Hartsville | 1930 | | James A. Wetmore, Ernest C. Steward | | |
| United States Post Office (Kingstree, South Carolina) | Kingstree | 1937–1938 | | | | |
| Monticello Store and Post Office | Monticello | c. 1820 | | unknown | | |
| Price's Post Office | Moore | c. 1800 | | unknown | | |
| United States Post Office (Mullins, South Carolina) | Mullins | 1939 | | | former | |
| United States Post Office and Courthouse (Rock Hill, South Carolina) | Rock Hill | 1931–1932 | | James A. Wetmore | | |
| United States Post Office (Summerville, South Carolina) | Summerville | 1938 | | | | |
| United States Post Office (Walterboro, South Carolina) | Walterboro | 1936–1937 | | | | |
| United States Post Office (Ware Shoals, South Carolina) | Ware Shoals | 1935 | | | | |
| United States Post Office (Winnsboro, South Carolina) | Winnsboro | 1936–1937 | | | | |
| United States Post Office (Woodruff, South Carolina) | Woodruff | 1939 | | Louis A. Simon, Neal A. Melick | | |
