= List of United States post offices in Louisiana =

United States post offices operate under the authority of the United States Post Office Department (1792–1971) or the United States Postal Service (since 1971). Historically, post offices were usually placed in a prominent location. Many were architecturally distinctive, including notable buildings featuring Beaux-Arts, Art Deco, and Vernacular architecture. However, modern U.S. post offices were generally designed for functionality rather than architectural style.

Following is a list of United States post offices in Louisiana. Notable post offices include individual buildings, whether still in service or not, which have architectural, historical, or community-related significance. Many of these are listed on the National Register of Historic Places (NRHP) or state and local historic registers.

Post office	City	Date built	Image	Architect	Notes	Ref.
United States Post Office and Courthouse–Alexandria	Alexandria	1932		Edward F. Neild	(Note: Listed on the National Register of Historic Places)	
United States Post Office (Arabi, Louisiana)	Arabi	1936–1937				
United States Post Office (Arcadia, Louisiana)	Arcadia	1937				
United States Post Office (Bastrop, Louisiana)	Bastrop	1935–1936				
United States Post Office and Courthouse–Baton Rouge	Baton Rouge	1932		Moise H. Goldstein Sr.		
Old Post Office (Baton Rouge, Louisiana)	Baton Rouge	1895		unknown		
Adam Ponthieu Store-Big Bend Post Office	Big Bend	1927		Byron F. Lemoine Sr.		
Bogalusa Post Office	Bogalusa	1930–1931		James A. Wetmore		
United States Post Office (Bunkie, Louisiana)	Bunkie	1937				
United States Post Office (Covington, Louisiana)	Covington	1938			(Note: No longer used as a post office.)	
United States Post Office (DeRidder, Louisiana)	DeRidder	1935				
United States Post Office (Donaldsonville, Louisiana)	Donaldsonville	1937				
United States Post Office (Eunice, Louisiana)	Eunice	1938–1939				
United States Post Office (Haynesville, Louisiana)	Haynesville	1936				
Central Bank and Trust Co	Hessmer	c. 1910		unknown		
United States Post Office (Houma, Louisiana)	Houma	1934–1935		Louis A. Simon		
United States Post Office (Jeanerette, Louisiana)	Jeanerette	1939				
Jennings Post Office	Jennings	1915		James A. Wetmore		
United States Post Office (Lake Providence, Louisiana)	Lake Providence	1940				
United States Post Office (Leesville, Louisiana)	Leesville	1936				
United States Post Office (Mansfield, Louisiana)	Mansfield	1931		James A. Wetmore		
United States Post Office and Courthouse (Monroe, Louisiana)	Monroe	1934		James A. Wetmore		
United States Post Office (Morgan City, Louisiana), now the Downtown Station	Morgan City	1932		James A. Wetmore		
New Orleans Main Post Office, now F. Edward Hebert Federal Building	New Orleans	1935–1939		Louis A. Simon, Neal A. Melick, Howard Lovewell Cheney		
Mix Store and Post Office	New Roads	c. 1890		unknown		
United States Post Office (Oakdale, Louisiana)	Oakdale	1936				
United States Post Office (Plaquemine, Louisiana)	Plaquemine	1935				
United States Post Office (Rayville, Louisiana)	Rayville	1937				
Star Hill Post Office and Store	St. Francisville	1898		unknown		
United States Post Office (St. Martinville, Louisiana), aka La Maison Duchamp	St. Martinville	1876		unknown	(Note: This is the only known private residence purchased and rehabilitated for use as a United States Post Office.)	
United States Post Office and Courthouse (Shreveport, Louisiana), now Shreve Public Library	Shreveport	1910		James Knox Taylor, James A. Wetmore		
Tallulah Post Office, now Madison Parish Health Unit	Tallulah	1934				
United States Post Office (Ville Platte, Louisiana)	Ville Platte	1937				
United States Post Office-Winnsboro, now Old Post Office Museum	Winnsboro	1937				
