= List of United States post offices in Kentucky =

United States post offices operate under the authority of the United States Post Office Department (1792–1971) or the United States Postal Service (since 1971). Historically, post offices were usually placed in a prominent location. Many were architecturally distinctive, including notable buildings featuring Beaux-Arts, Art Deco, and Vernacular architecture. However, modern U.S. post offices were generally designed for functionality rather than architectural style.

Following is a list of United States post offices in Kentucky. Notable post offices include individual buildings, whether still in service or not, which have architectural, historical, or community-related significance. Many of these are listed on the National Register of Historic Places (NRHP) or state and local historic registers.

| Post office | City | Date built | Image | Architect | Notes | Ref. |
|---|---|---|---|---|---|---|
| United States Post Office (Anchorage, Kentucky) | Anchorage | 1940 | | | | |
| United States Post Office (Ashland, Kentucky) | Ashland | 1915–1916 | | James A. Wetmore | (Note: Listed on the National Register of Historic Places) | |
| Callis General Store and Post Office | Bedford | 1880 | | unknown | | |
| Belleview Post Office | Belleview | c. 1880 | | unknown | | |
| United States Post Office, now Berea Police and Municipal Center | Berea | 1938 | | | (Note: No longer used as a post office.) | |
| United States Post Office and Courthouse-Bowling Green, now William H. Natcher Federal Building and United States Courthouse | Bowling Green | 1912 | | James Knox Taylor | | |
| United States Post Office (Bronston, Kentucky) | Bronston | 1895 | | unknown | | |
| Bryantsville Post Office and Store | Bryantsville | | | unknown | | |
| United States Post Office (Campbellsville, Kentucky) | Campbellsville | 1936 | | Louis A. Simon | | |
| United States Post Office (Carlisle, Kentucky) | Carlisle | 1941 | | | | |
| United States Post Office (Corbin, Kentucky) | Corbin | 1938 | | Louis A. Simon, Neal A. Melick | | |
| United States Post Office (Covington, Kentucky) | Covington | 1941 | | | | |
| Dabney Post Office | Dabney | 1900 | | Ped May | | |
| United States Post Office-Elizabethtown, now Hardin County Public Library | Elizabethtown | 1931 | | Louis A. Simon, James A. Wetmore | | |
| United States Post Office (Flemingsburg, Kentucky) | Flemingsburg | 1941 | | | | |
| United States Post Office (Fort Thomas, Kentucky) | Fort Thomas | 1940 | | | | |
| Old United States Courthouse and Post Office (Frankfort, Kentucky) | Frankfort | 1883–1887 | | James Knox Taylor | | |
| U.S. Post Office-Glasgow, now Barren County Board of Education Building | Glasgow | 1918 | | unknown | | |
| United States Post Office (Greenville, Kentucky) | Greenville | 1938 | | | | |
| United States Post Office (Hardinsburg, Kentucky) | Hardinsburg | 1941 | | | | |
| United States Post Office (Harrodsburg, Kentucky) | Harrodsburg | 1930 | | James A. Wetmore | | |
| United States Post Office (Hickman, Kentucky) | Hickman | 1939 | | | | |
| United States Post Office (Hodgenville, Kentucky) | Hodgenville | 1937 | | | | |
| United States Post Office (Irvine, Kentucky) | Irvine | 1938 | | | | |
| Jackson Post Office | Jackson | 1916 | | Oscar Wenderoth | | |
| United StatesPost Office (Jenkins, Kentucky) | Jenkins | 1941 | | | | |
| United States Post Office and Court House (Lexington, Kentucky) | Lexington | 1934 | | H. A. Churchill and John T. Gillig; Louis A. Simon | | |
| United States Post Office (Louisa, Kentucky) | Louisa | 1938 | | | | |
| United States Post Office, Court House and Custom House, now Gene Snyder United States Courthouse | Louisville | 1931–1932 | | James A. Wetmore | | |
| Old United States Customshouse and Post Office and Fireproof Storage Company Warehouse | Louisville | 1853 | | E. E. Williams, John Bacon Hutchings | | |
| United States Post Office (Madisonville, Kentucky) | Madisonville | 1931 | | James A. Wetmore | | |
| United States Post Office (Mayfield, Kentucky) | Mayfield | 1910 | | McHenry-Beatty Company | | |
| United States Post Office (Morehead, Kentucky) | Morehead | 1936 | | Louis A. Simon, Neal A. Melick | | |
| United States Post Office (Morganfield, Kentucky) | Morganfield | 1937 | | | | |
| United States Post Office (Murray, Kentucky) | Murray | 1931 | | unknown | | |
| Federal Building and US Post Office (Owensboro, Kentucky) | Owensboro | 1909–1911 | | James Knox Taylor | | |
| United StatesPost Office (Pineville, Kentucky) | Pineville | 1935 | | | | |
| United States Post Office (Prestonsburg, Kentucky) | Prestonsburg | 1931–1932 | | James A. Wetmore | | |
| United States Post Office (Princeton, Kentucky) | Princeton | 1936 | | | | |
| United States Post Office (Springfield, Kentucky) | Springfield | 1939 | | | | |
| United States Post Office (Williamstown, Kentucky) | Williamstown | 1941 | | | | |
| Willisburg Central Bank and Post Office | Willisburg | c. 1906 | | unknown | | |
