= List of United States post offices in Michigan =

United States post offices operate under the authority of the United States Post Office Department (1792–1971) or the United States Postal Service (since 1971). Historically, post offices were usually placed in a prominent location. Many were architecturally distinctive, including notable buildings featuring Beaux-Arts, Art Deco, and Vernacular architecture. However, modern U.S. post offices were generally designed for functionality rather than architectural style.

Following is a list of United States post offices in Michigan. Notable post offices include individual buildings, whether still in service or not, which have architectural, historical, or community-related significance. Many of these are listed on the National Register of Historic Places (NRHP) or state and local historic registers.

Post office	City	Date built	Image	Architect	Notes	Ref.
United States Post Office (Allegan, Michigan)	Allegan	1936				
United States Post Office (Alma, Michigan)	Alma	1938			(Note: Houses New Deal artwork.)	
Main Street Post Office, now Washtenaw County Administration Building	Ann Arbor	1906		Fremont Ward	(Note: Listed on the National Register of Historic Places) (Note: No longer used as a post office.)	
Old Battle Creek Post Office	Battle Creek	1904		Albert Kahn		
United States Post Office (Belding, Michigan)	Belding	1933			(Note: Houses the New Deal mural Belding Brothers and Their Silk Industry by Marvin Beerhom.)	
United States Post Office (Birmingham, Michigan)	Birmingham	1940				
United States Post Office (Blissfield, Michigan)	Blissfield	1938			(Note: Houses a New Deal mural by Jean Paul Slusser.)	
United States Post Office (Bronson, Michigan)	Bronson	1940–1941				
United States Post Office (Buchanan, Michigan)	Buchanan	1940				
United States Post Office (Calumet, Michigan)	Calumet	1939		part of Keweenaw National Historical Park	(Note: Houses the New Deal mural Copper Mining in Calumet by Joe Lasker.)	
United States Post Office (Caro, Michigan)	Caro	1939			(Note: Houses the New Deal tempera mural Mail on the Farm by David Fredenthal.)	
United States Post Office (Chelsea, Michigan)	Chelsea	1937				
United States Post Office (Clare, Michigan)	Clare	1937				
Climax Post Office, now the Lawrence Memorial Library	Climax	1931		Laverne Harman		
United States Post Office (Crystal Falls, Michigan)	Crystal Falls	1937				
United States Post Office, Court House, and Custom House	Detroit	1890–1897		James H. Windrim		
Detroit Federal Building, now Theodore Levin United States Courthouse	Detroit	1932–1934		James A. Wetmore, Robert O. Derrick Inc.		
Jefferson Station Post Office	Detroit	1940				
United States Post Office (East Lansing, Michigan)	East Lansing					
United States Post Office (East Tawas, Michigan)	East Tawas	1941				
United States Post Office (Eastpointe, Michigan)	Eastpointe	1938				
United States Post Office (Eaton Rapids, Michigan)	Eaton Rapids	1938				
United States Post Office (Ferndale, Michigan)	Ferndale	1937				
United States Post Office (Flint, Michigan)	Flint	1931		James A. Wetmore		
United States Post Office (Fremont, Michigan)	Fremont	1935				
United States Post Office (Gladstone, Michigan)	Gladstone	1934		Louis A. Simon, George O. Von Nerta		
United States Post Office (Grand Ledge, Michigan)	Grand Ledge	1939			(Note: Houses the New Deal mural, Waiting for the Mail by James Calder.)	
U.S. Post Office (Grand Rapids, Michigan), now the Woodbridge N. Ferris Building	Grand Rapids	1906		James K. Taylor		
United States Post Office (Grayling, Michigan)	Grayling	1937				
United States Post Office (Greenville, Michigan)	Greenville	1938			(Note: Houses the New Deal mural Lumbering by Charles W. Thwaite.)	
United States Post Office (Hamtramck, Michigan)	Hamtramck	1935		Louis A. Simon, Neal A. Melick, Julius Boenisch		
United States Post Office (Hancock, Michigan)	Hancock	1935				
United States Post Office (Hart, Michigan)	Hart	1935				
United States Post Office (Highland Park, Michigan)	Highland Park	1940				
United States Post Office (Iron Mountain, Michigan)	Iron Mountain	1935				
United States Post Office (Iron River, Michigan)	Iron River	1940				
Stone Post Office	Jackson	1839		Joseph G. R. Blackwell		
United States Post Office, now Kalamazoo Federal Building and U.S. Courthouse	Kalamazoo	1938–1939		Louis A. Simon, Neal A. Melick, LeRoy and Newlander, George D. Maon and Company		
Lincoln Park Post Office, now Lincoln Park Historical Museum	Lincoln Park	1938		Louis A. Simon		
United States Post Office (Lowell, Michigan)	Lowell	1940				
United States Post Office (Manistique, Michigan)	Manistique	1939–1940		Louis A. Simon, Neal A. Melick		
United States Post Office and Court House (Marquette, Michigan)	Marquette	1935–1937		Le Roy Gaarder, Louis A. Simon, Neal A. Melick	(Note: Houses a New Deal mural called Marquette Exploring Shores of Lake Superior.)	
United States Post Office (Mason, Michigan)	Mason	1938		Louis A. Simon, Neal A. Melick	(Note: Houses the New Deal relief artwork, Early Postman, by Marion Overby.)	
United States Post Office (Munising, Michigan)	Munising	1938				
United States Post Office (Muskegon, Michigan)	Muskegon	1937–1938				
United States Post Office (Negaunee, Michigan)	Negaunee	1937		Louis A. Simon, Neal A. Melick		
Old U.S. Post Office (Niles, Michigan)	Niles	1909		James Knox Taylor		
United States Post Office (Paw Paw, Michigan)	Paw Paw	1939–1940		Louis A. Simon, Neal A. Melick		
Purcell Station Post Office	Plymouth	1936				
United States Post Office (River Rouge, Michigan)	River Rouge	1938				
United States Post Office (Rochester, Michigan)	Rochester	1937–1938		Louis A. Simon	(Note: The building originally housed a sculpture by Alexander Sambugnac.)	
United States Post Office (Rockford, Michigan)	Rockford	1938				
United States Post Office (Rogers City, Michigan)	Rogers City	1940		Louis A. Simon, Neal A. Melick	(Note: Houses the New Deal mural Harbor at Rogers City by James Calder.)	
United States Post Office (Royal Oak, Michigan)	Royal Oak	1936				
United States Post Office (Sandusky, Michigan)	Sandusky	1940				
Saginaw Post Office, now the Castle Museum	Saginaw	1898		William M. Aiken, Carl Macomber		
United States Post Office (St. Clair, Michigan)	St. Clair	1937–1938				
United States Post Office (St. Johns, Michigan)	St. Johns	1935				
United States Post Office (St. Joseph, Michigan)	St. Joseph	1937				
United States Post Office (Traverse City, Michigan)	Traverse City	1938		Louis A. Simon, Neal A. Melick		
United States Post Office (Wayne, Michigan)	Wayne	1938				
United States Post Office (Zeeland, Michigan)	Zeeland	1935				
