= List of United States post offices in Vermont =

United States post offices operate under the authority of the United States Post Office Department (1792–1971) or the United States Postal Service (since 1971). Historically, post offices were usually placed in a prominent location. Many were architecturally distinctive, including notable buildings featuring Beaux-Arts, Art Deco, and Vernacular architecture. However, modern U.S. post offices were generally designed for functionality rather than architectural style.

Following is a list of United States post offices in Vermont. Notable post offices include individual buildings, whether still in service or not, which have architectural, historical, or community-related significance. Many of these are listed on the National Register of Historic Places (NRHP) or state and local historic registers.

Post office	City	Date built	Image	Architect	Notes	Ref.
Old Bennington Post Office	Bennington	1914		James Knox Taylor	(Note: Listed on the National Register of Historic Places.)	
United States Post Office and Customhouse (now Chittenden County Superior Courthouse)	Burlington	1906		James Knox Taylor	(Note: No longer used as a post office)	
J. S. Sweeney Store, Barn, Livery and Hall	Charleston	1860		unknown		
Ely Boston & Maine Railroad Depot	Fairlee	1900		Boston and Maine Railroad		
Grafton Post Office	Grafton	1855		unknown		
Ira Hill House	Isle La Mott	1822		James Ritchie		
United States Courthouse, Post Office and Customs House	Newport	1904		James Knox Taylor		
United States Post Office (Northfield, Vermont)	Northfield	1937		Louis A. Simon, Neal A. Melick		
Chipman's Point	Orwell	1810		unknown		
United States Post Office and Custom House (St. Albans, Vermont)	St. Albans	1937–1938		Louis A. Simon, Neal A. Melick, Lorimer Rich		
United States Post Office (Springfield, Vermont)	Springfield	1935–1937		Louis A. Simon, Neal A. Melick, Frank Lyman Austin		
United States Post Office (White River Junction, Vermont), now The Center for Cartoon Studies	White River Junction	1934		Louis A. Simon, George O. Von Nerta	(Note: Contributing structure of the White River Junction Historic District)	
United States Post Office (Woodstock, Vermont)	Woodstock	1937		Louis A. Simon, Neal A. Melick		
