= List of United States post offices in Rhode Island =

United States post offices operate under the authority of the United States Post Office Department (1792–1971) or the United States Postal Service (since 1971). Historically, post offices were usually placed in a prominent location. Many were architecturally distinctive, including notable buildings featuring Beaux-Arts, Art Deco, and Vernacular architecture. However, modern U.S. post offices were generally designed for functionality rather than architectural style.

Following is a list of United States post offices in Rhode Island. Notable post offices include individual buildings, whether still in service or not, which have architectural, historical, or community-related significance. Many of these are listed on the National Register of Historic Places (NRHP) or state and local historic registers.

| Post office | City | Date built | Image | Architect | Notes | Ref. |
|---|---|---|---|---|---|---|
| Bristol Customshouse and Post Office | Bristol | 1858 | | Ammi B. Young | (Note: Listed on the National Register of Historic Places) (Note: No longer used as a post office.) | |
| United States Post Office (East Providence, Rhode Island) | East Providence | 1936 | | Louis A. Simon, Neal A. Melick | (Note: Houses New Deal murals by Eugene Kingman.) | |
| Pawtucket Post Office, now Gerald Burns Building | Pawtucket | 1896 | | William Martin Aiken; James Knox Taylor | | |
| United States Post Office Annex (Providence, Rhode Island), now John O. Pastore Federal Building | Providence | 1938– 1940 | | Louis A. Simon, F. Ellis Jackson, Neal A. Melick | | |
| Apponaug Post Office (Warwick, Rhode Island) | Warwick | 1940 | | Louis A. Simon | (Note: Houses the New Deal mural Apponaug Fishermen by Paul Sample.) | |
| United States Post Office (Westerly, Rhode Island) | Westerly | 1914 | | James Knox Taylor | (Note: Contributing structure to the Westerly Downtown Historic District and the Wilcox Park Historic District.) | |
| United States Post Office (Woonsocket, Rhode Island), now YMCA | Woonsocket | 1910 | | Louis Wetmore; J. K. Taylor | | |
