= List of United States post offices in Pennsylvania =

United States post offices operate under the authority of the United States Post Office Department (1792–1971) or the United States Postal Service (since 1971). Historically, post offices were usually placed in a prominent location. Many were architecturally distinctive, including notable buildings featuring Beaux-Arts, Art Deco, and Vernacular architecture. However, modern U.S. post offices were generally designed for functionality rather than architectural style.

Following is a list of United States post offices in Pennsylvania. Notable post offices include individual buildings, whether still in service or not, which have architectural, historical, or community-related significance. Many of these are listed on the National Register of Historic Places (NRHP) or state and local historic registers.

Post office	City	Date built	Image	Architect	Notes	Ref.
United States Post Office (Charleroi, Pennsylvania), now John K. Tener Library	Charleroi	1909–1912		James Knox Taylor	(Note: No longer used as a post office.) (Note: Listed on the National Register of Historic Places.)	
United States Post Office (Connellsville, Pennsylvania)	Connellsville	1913		James Knox Taylor		
Erie Federal Courthouse and Post Office	Erie	1937		R. Stanley-Brown, Louis A. Simon		
United States Post Office (Hanover, Pennsylvania)	Hanover	1911–1913		James Knox Taylor		
United States Post Office (Lancaster, Pennsylvania)	Lancaster	1928–1930		James A. Wetmore		
United States Post Office (Oil City, Pennsylvania)	Oil City	1906		James Knox Taylor		
United States Post Office-Main Branch (Philadelphia)	Philadelphia	1931–1935		Rankin & Kellogg		
United States Post Office and Federal Building	Philadelphia	1873–1884			(Note: Building was demolished in 1935, making way for a new facility.)	
United States Court House and Post Office Building, now the Nix Federal Building	Philadelphia	1937		Harry Sternfeld, Ballinger Company	(Note: Houses three New Deal artworks, the sculptural panels Justice and Law by Donald De Lue and Mail Delivery – West by Edmond Amateis.)	
B. Free Franklin Post Office	Philadelphia				(Note: This was the site of the first U.S. Post Office.)	
Allegheny Post Office, now Children's Museum of Pittsburgh	Pittsburgh	1893–1897		Frank E. Rutan, Jeremiah O'Rourke, William M. Aiken		
United States Post Office and Courthouse-Pittsburgh, now Joseph F. Weis, Jr. U.S. Courthouse	Pittsburgh	1931–1934		Trowbridge & Livingston, Shalom Baranes Associates, James A. Wetmore	(Note: Contributing structure to the Pittsburgh Central Downtown Historic District.)	
United States Post Office (Punxsutawney, Pennsylvania)	Punxsutawney	1912–1914		James Knox Taylor		
United States Post Office and Court House, now William J. Nealon Federal Building and United States Courthouse	Scranton	1931		Louis A. Simon, James A. Wetmore		
United States Post Office-Sewickley Branch, now Sewickley Valley Cultural Center	Sewickley	1911		James Knox Taylor		
United States Post Office (West Chester, Pennsylvania)	West Chester	1907		James Knox Taylor	(Note: Contributing structure to the West Chester Downtown Historic District.)	
United States Post Office, now City Hall (Williamsport, Pennsylvania)	Williamsport	1888–1891		William Alfred Freret		
