= List of United States post offices in South Dakota =

United States post offices operate under the authority of the United States Post Office Department (1792–1971) or the United States Postal Service (since 1971). Historically, post offices were usually placed in a prominent location. Many were architecturally distinctive, including notable buildings featuring Beaux-Arts, Art Deco, and Vernacular architecture. However, modern U.S. post offices were generally designed for functionality rather than architectural style.

Following is a list of United States post offices in South Dakota. Notable post offices include individual buildings, whether still in service or not, which have architectural, historical, or community-related significance. Many of these are listed on the National Register of Historic Places (NRHP) or state and local historic registers.

Post office	City	Date built	Image	Architect	Notes	Ref.
United States Post Office and Courthouse–Aberdeen	Aberdeen	1936–1938		William Dewey Foster	(Note: Housed the New Deal artwork The Building of Grand Crossing, a walnut relief by Laci de Gerenday, that was later moved to a nearby federal building.) (Note: Listed on the National Register of Historical Places) (Note: No longer used as a post office.)	
United States Post Office (Beresford, South Dakota)	Beresford	1939			(Note: Houses the New Deal mural Spirit of Beresford by David McCosh.)	
United States Post Office (Custer, South Dakota)	Custer	1940		Louis A. Simon, Neal A. Melick		
United States Post Office (Flandreau, South Dakota)	Flandreau	1938			(Note: Houses the New Deal mural Wheat in the Shock by Matthew Ziegler.)	
United States Post Office (Gregory, South Dakota)	Gregory	1937				
United States Post Office Addition (Huron, South Dakota)	Huron	1911–1914				
Lemmon Post Office	Lemmon	1936–1937		Louis A. Simon, Neal A. Melick		
United States Post Office (Mobridge, South Dakota)	Mobridge	1937–1938		Louis A. Simon, Neal A. Melick	(Note: Houses the New Deal mural Return from the Fields by Elof Wedin.)	
Federal Building and United States Courthouse (Sioux Falls, South Dakota)	Sioux Falls	1892–1895,1932		Willoughby J. Edbrooke		
Old Spearfish Post Office	Spearfish	1940		Louis A. Simon, Neal A. Melick	(Note: Houses the New Deal artwork Fish Story, three wooden reliefs by Marion Overby.)	
Old Post Office, now Sturgis Motorcycle Museum	Sturgis	1937		Louis A. Simon, Neal A. Melick	(Note: Houses the New Deal mural The Fate of a Mail Carrier—Charlie Nolin—1876 by J. K. Ralston.)	
Marindahl Post Office	Volin	1870		unknown		
Old Post Office (Watertown, South Dakota)	Watertown	1908–1909		James Knox Taylor	(Note: Identical to the building in Yankton, South Dakota.)	
United States Post Office (Webster, South Dakota)	Webster	1937–1938				
United States Post Office (Yankton, South Dakota)	Yankton	1905		James Knox Taylor		
