= List of United States post offices in Missouri =

United States post offices operate under the authority of the United States Post Office Department (1792–1971) or the United States Postal Service (since 1971). Historically, post offices were usually placed in a prominent location. Many were architecturally distinctive, including notable buildings featuring Beaux-Arts, Art Deco, and Vernacular architecture. However, modern U.S. post offices were generally designed for functionality rather than architectural style.

Following is a list of United States post offices in Missouri. Notable post offices include individual buildings, whether still in service or not, which have architectural, historical, or community-related significance. Many of these are listed on the National Register of Historic Places (NRHP) or state and local historic registers.

Post office	City	Date built	Image	Architect	Notes	Ref.
United States Post Office, aka Bank of Avilla	Avilla	1914		unknown	(Note: Listed on the National Register of Historic Places)	
United States Post Office (Bethany, Missouri)	Bethany	1939		Louis A. Simon, Neal A. Melick	(Note: Houses the New Deal mural Time Out by Joseph Vorst.)	
United States Post Office (Bowling Green, Missouri)	Bowling Green	1935		Louis A. Simon, Neal A. Melick		
United States Post Office (California, Missouri)	California	1938				
United States Post Office (Canton, Missouri)	Canton	1939			(Note: Houses the New Deal mural Winter Landscape by Jessie Hull Mayer.)	
United States Post Office (Carrollton, Missouri)	Carrollton	1910–1912		James Knox Taylor		
United States Post Office (Cassville, Missouri)	Cassville	1938		Louis A. Simon, Neal A. Melick	(Note: Houses the New Deal mural by Flora and Fauna of the Region by Edward Winter.)	
United States Post Office (Charleston, Missouri)	Charleston	1937		Louis A. Simon, Neal A. Melick	(Note: Houses the New Deal mural Harvest by Joe Jones.)	
United States Post Office (Clinton, Missouri)	Clinton	1940		Louis A. Simon, Neal A. Melick	(Note: Houses the New Deal mural Coon Hunt by Richard Haines.)	
Federal Hall (old Post Office)	Columbia	1935		Louis A. Simon, Neal A. Melick, John Parks Almand	(Note: Originally housed Pony Express and Indians Watching Stagecoach in the Distance, two New Deal murals that were relocated when the post office moved and are now displayed in the National Archives at Kansas City.) (Note: No longer used as a post office.)	
United States Post Office (Dexter, Missouri)	Dexter	1939			(Note: Houses the New Deal mural Husking Corn by Joe Jones.)	
United States Post Office (El Dorado Springs, Missouri)	El Dorado Springs	1940				
United States Post Office (Eldon, Missouri)	Eldon	1940			(Note: Houses the New Deal mural Picnic, Lake of the Ozarks by Frederick Shane.)	
United States Post Office (Fredericktown, Missouri)	Fredericktown	1936–1937		Louis A. Simon, Neal A. Melick	(Note: Houses the New Deal mural The Lead Belt by James Turnbull.)	
United States Post Office (Higginsville, Missouri)	Higginsville	1936		Louis A. Simon, Neal A. Melick	(Note: Houses the New Deal mural Industrial Activity in the City by Jac T. Bowen.)	
United States Post Office (Jackson, Missouri), now Jackson Chamber of Commerce	Jackson	1938		Louis A. Simon, Neal A. Melick	(Note: Originally housed a New Deal mural, which was moved to the new post office.)	
United States Courthouse and Post Office (Kansas City, Missouri)	Kansas City	1938–1939		Wight and Wight		
United States Post Office (La Plata, Missouri)	La Plata	1937		Louis A. Simon, Neal A. Melick	(Note: Houses the New Deal mural Missouri Livestock by Emma Lu Davis.)	
Old Post Office, now Lee's Summit History Museum	Lee's Summit	1939			(Note: Houses the New Deal mural "Pastoral" by Ted Gillien.) (Note: Contributing structure to the Lee's Summit Downtown Historic District,)	
United States Post Office (Maplewood, Missouri)	Maplewood	1940		Louis A. Simon, Neal A. Melick	(Note: Houses the New New wood bas relief sculpture Family Group by Carl Mose.)	
United States Post Office (Marceline, Missouri)	Marceline	1936		Louis A. Simon, Neal A. Melick	(Note: Houses the New Deal mural Contemporary Life in Missouri by Joseph Meert.)	
United States Post Office (Monett, Missouri)	Monett	1937			(Note: Houses the New Deal mural Products of Missouri by James McCreery.)	
United States Post Office (Mount Vernon, Missouri)	Mount Vernon	1937		Louis A. Simon, Neal A. Melick	(Note: Houses the New Deal mural Spring Pastoral by Joseph Meert.)	
United States Post Office (Palmyra, Missouri)	Palmyra	1940		Louis A. Simon, Neal A. Melick	(Note: Houses New Deal mural Memories of Marion County by James Penney.)	
United States Post Office (Paris, Missouri)	Paris	1937		Louis A. Simon, Neal A. Melick	(Note: Houses the New Deal mural The Clemens Family Arrives in Monroe County by Fred G. Carpenter.)	
United States Post Office (Pleasant Hill, Missouri)	Pleasant Hill	1937			(Note: Houses the New Deal mural "Back Home, April 1865" by Tom Lea.)	
United States Post Office (Richmond, Missouri)	Richmond	1935		Louis A. Simon, Neal A. Melick		
United States Post Office (Ste. Genevieve, Missouri)	Ste. Genevieve	1939		Louis A. Simon, Neal A. Melick	(Note: House the New Deal mural "La Guignolee" by Martyl Schweig.)	
United States Post Office (St. Joseph, Missouri)	St. Joseph	1938		Louis A. Simon, Neal A. Melick, Alan Balch Mills	(Note: Houses a series of New Deal frescoes by Gustaf Dahlstrom.)	
United States Customhouse and Post Office (St. Louis, Missouri)	St. Louis	1873–1884		Alfred B. Mullett, William Appleton Potter, James G. Hill	(Note: The building is a National Historic Landmark.)	
Union Station Post Office Annex	St. Louis	1904		Eames & Young		
Main Post Office – St. Louis, Missouri	St. Louis	1935–1937		Louis A. Simon, Neal A. Melick, Klipstein & Rathmann	(Note: Houses nine New Deal murals by Edward Millman and Mitchell Siporin.)	
Gwen B. Giles Station Post Office	St. Louis	1936–1937		Louis A. Simon, Neal A. Melick, Harry B. Carter	(Note: Houses the New Deal mural Old Levee and Market at St. Louis by Lumen Winter.)	
University City Station Post Office	St. Louis	1938			(Note: Houses the New Deal mural The Louisiana Purchase Exposition by Trew Hocker.)	
United States Post Office (Savannah, Missouri)	Savannah	1939		Louis A. Simon		
U.S. Customhouse and Post Office (Springfield, Missouri), aka Historic City Hall	Springfield	1891		James H. Windrim, Willoughby J. Edbrooke		
United States Post Office (Sullivan, Missouri)	Sullivan	1940		Louis A. Simon, Neal A. Melick	(Note: Houses the New Deal mural Saturday Afternoon on Main St. by Lawrence Adams)	
United States Post Office (Union, Missouri)	Union	1939		Louis A. Simon, Neal A. Melick	(Note: Originally housed a New Deal mural by James Penney, which was moved to the new post office.)	
United States Post Office (Vandalia, Missouri)	Vandalia	1936		Louis A. Simon, Neal A. Melick	(Note: Houses the New Deal mural Corn Harvest by Joseph Vorst.)	
