= Index of lists of United States post offices articles =

- List of United States post offices in Alabama
- List of United States post offices in Alaska
- List of United States post offices in Arizona
- List of United States post offices in Arkansas
- List of United States post offices in California
- List of United States post offices in Colorado
- List of United States post offices in Connecticut
- List of United States post offices in Delaware
- List of United States post offices in Florida
- List of United States post offices in Georgia
- List of United States post offices in Hawaii
- List of United States post offices in Idaho
- List of United States post offices in Illinois
- List of United States post offices in Indiana
- List of United States post offices in Iowa
- List of United States post offices in Kansas
- List of United States post offices in Kentucky
- List of United States post offices in Louisiana
- List of United States post offices in Maine
- List of United States post offices in Maryland
- List of United States post offices in Massachusetts
- List of United States post offices in Michigan
- List of United States post offices in Minnesota
- List of United States post offices in Mississippi
- List of United States post offices in Missouri
- List of United States post offices in Montana
- List of United States post offices in Nebraska
- List of United States post offices in Nevada
- List of United States post offices in New Hampshire
- List of United States post offices in New Jersey
- List of United States post offices in New Mexico
- List of United States post offices in New York
- List of United States post offices in North Carolina
- List of United States post offices in North Dakota
- List of United States post offices in Ohio
- List of United States post offices in Oklahoma
- List of United States post offices in Oregon
- List of United States post offices in Pennsylvania
- List of United States post offices in Rhode Island
- List of United States post offices in South Carolina
- List of United States post offices in South Dakota
- List of United States post offices in Tennessee
- List of United States post offices in Texas
- List of United States post offices in Utah
- List of United States post offices in Vermont
- List of United States post offices in Virginia
- List of United States post offices in Washington
- List of United States post offices in Washington, D.C.
- List of United States post offices in West Virginia
- List of United States post offices in Wisconsin
- List of United States post offices in Wyoming
- List of post offices in United States territories
