= List of United States post offices in Washington, D.C. =

United States post offices operate under the authority of the United States Post Office Department (1792–1971) or the United States Postal Service (since 1971). Historically, post offices were usually placed in a prominent location. Many were architecturally distinctive, including notable buildings featuring Beaux-Arts, Art Deco, and Vernacular architecture. However, modern U.S. post offices were generally designed for functionality rather than architectural style.

Following is a list of United States post offices in Washington, D.C. Notable post offices include individual buildings, whether still in service or not, which have architectural, historical, or community-related significance. Many of these are listed on the National Register of Historic Places (NRHP) or state and local historic registers.

Post office	City	Date built	Image	Architect	Notes	Ref.
Customhouse and Post Office (Washington, D.C.)	Washington, D.C.	1858		Ammi B. Young	(Note: Listed on the National Register of Historic Places) (Note: Contributing structure to the Georgetown Historic District.)	
General Post Office (Washington, D.C.), now Hotel Monaco	Washington, D.C.	1839, 1866		Robert Mills, Thomas Ustick Walter	(Note: Building is a National Historic Landmark.) (Note: No longer used as a post office.)	
Old Post Office and Clock Tower	Washington, D.C.	1899		Willoughby J. Edbrooke		
Postal Square Building, now National Postal Museum	Washington, D.C.	1911–1914		Daniel Burnham		
