= United States Post Office (Fayetteville, North Carolina) =

Historic post office in North Carolina, US

- U.S. Post Office
- U.S. National Register of Historic Places
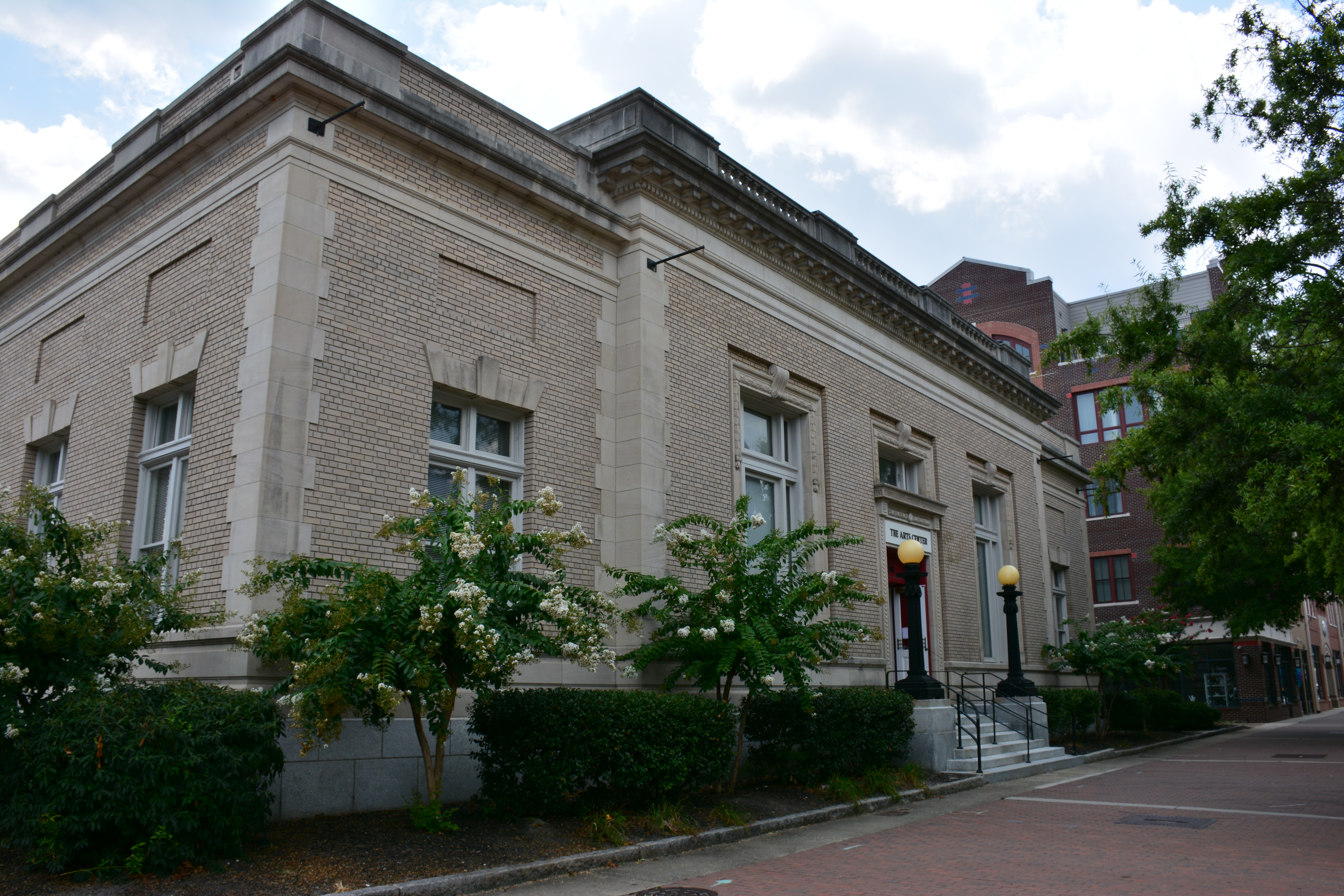

- Location within North Carolina Location within the United States
- Location: 301 Hay St., Fayetteville, North Carolina
- Coordinates: 35°3′12″N 78°52′53″W
- Area: less than one acre
- Built: 1909-1911, 1935
- Architectural style: Classical Revival, Neo-Classical Revival
- MPS: Fayetteville MRA
- NRHP reference No.: 83001873
- Added to NRHP: July 7, 1983

U.S. Post Office is a historic post office building located at Fayetteville, Cumberland County, North Carolina. It was built between 1909 and 1911, and is a one-story, five-bay, Classical Revival-style brick building. A wing was added in 1935. It housed a post office into the 1960s, after which it was used as a branch library.

It was listed on the National Register of Historic Places in 1983.
