= United States Post Office (Rehoboth Beach, Delaware) =

Building in Delaware, United States

The United States Post Office in Rehoboth Beach, Delaware is a historic post office in Rehoboth Beach, Delaware, United States. It was built in 1937 using federal Treasury Department funds. The edifice has an example of New Deal artwork, "Frontier Mail" which is a mural made by Karl Knaths back in 1940. The work was commissioned by the federal Treasury Section of Fine Arts. The structure was a fallout shelter but was proposed in approximately 2024 for designation as a historical monument.
