= United States Post Office Towson Branch =

Building in Maryland, US

Coordinates: 39°23′58.2″N 76°36′20.4″W

The Towson Post Office at 101 West Chesapeake Avenue in Towson, Maryland, was completed in 1937. It is a two-story, limestone building, that is lightly styled in a Neo-Classical fashion. Formally the body of the building consists of three bays where the larger central portion projects slightly. The roof is a low gable topped by a modest central cupola. The lobby contains a transportation themed Works Progress Administration mural by Nicolai Cikovski. The mural drew considerable attention and criticism in the local press when it was completed in June 1938. The artist was a Russian emigre and an instructor at the Corcoran Gallery in Washington.
