= Oscar Wenderoth =

American architect (1871–1938)

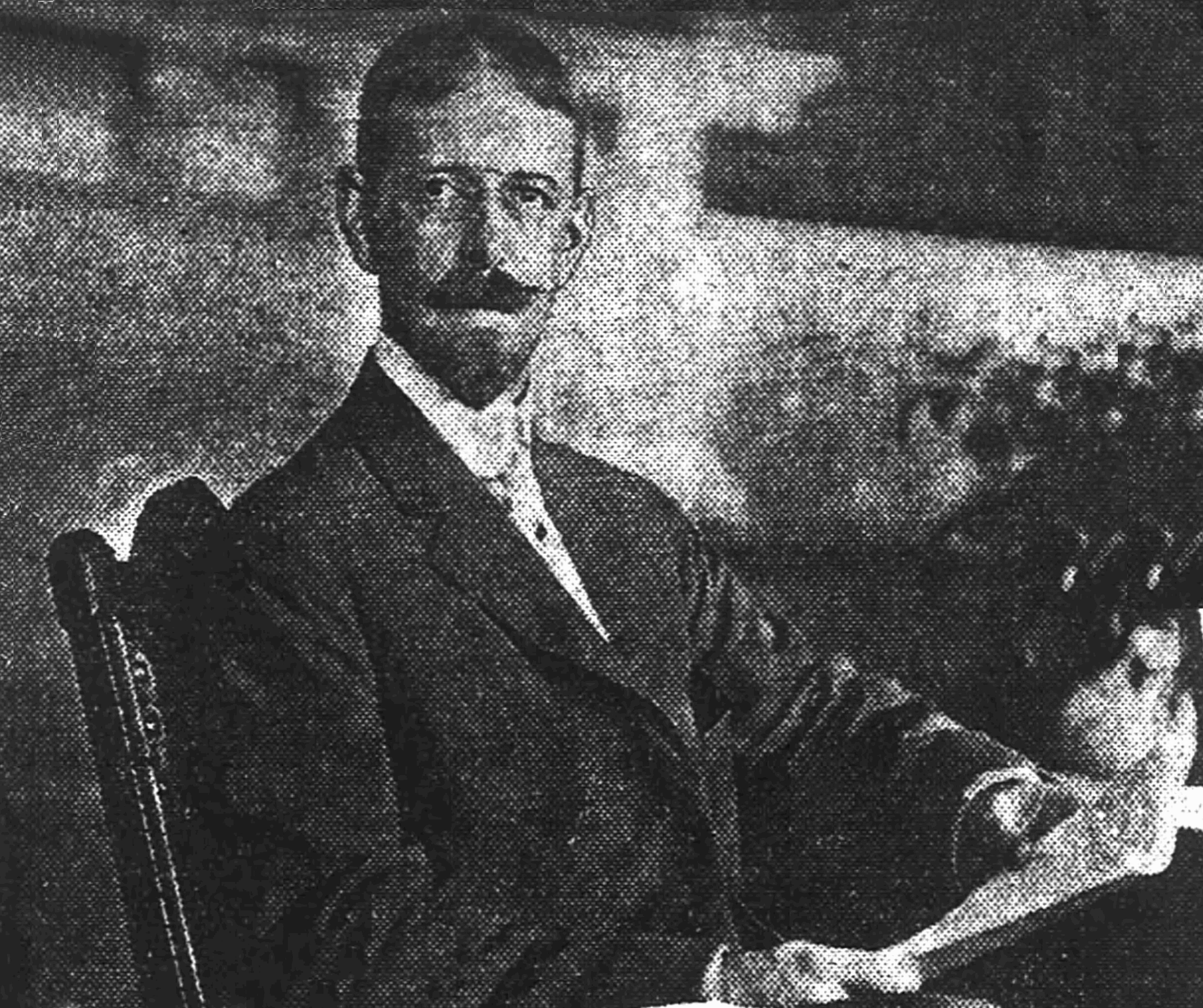
- Born: April 10, 1871; Philadelphia, Pennsylvania U.S.A.
- Died: April 14, 1938 (aged 67); New York, New York, U.S.A.
- Occupation: Architect

Oscar Wenderoth (1871–1938) was an American architect who served as director of the Office of the Supervising Architect from 1912 to 1915. He is identified as the architect of many government buildings built during that period, including some listed on the National Register of Historic Places.

Wenderoth was born in Philadelphia in 1871 and was the son of the noted photographer Frederick August Wenderoth, a pioneer "...in addressing the public's desire for colored photographs." Early in his architectural career Oscar worked for the New York City firm of Carrere and Hastings. He first joined the Office of Supervising Architect as a senior architectural draftsman in 1897, working in the office for three separate time periods before being appointed as its director.

He was appointed to the directorship by President William Howard Taft in 1912. He resigned in 1915 without providing a public explanation of his resignation. Soon after his resignation he joined Weary & Alford in Chicago as Supervising Architect, where he worked for five years. In the ensuing years his sight failed, leading to blindness and retirement in 1920. He died in 1938 in New York City.

== Selected government buildings ==
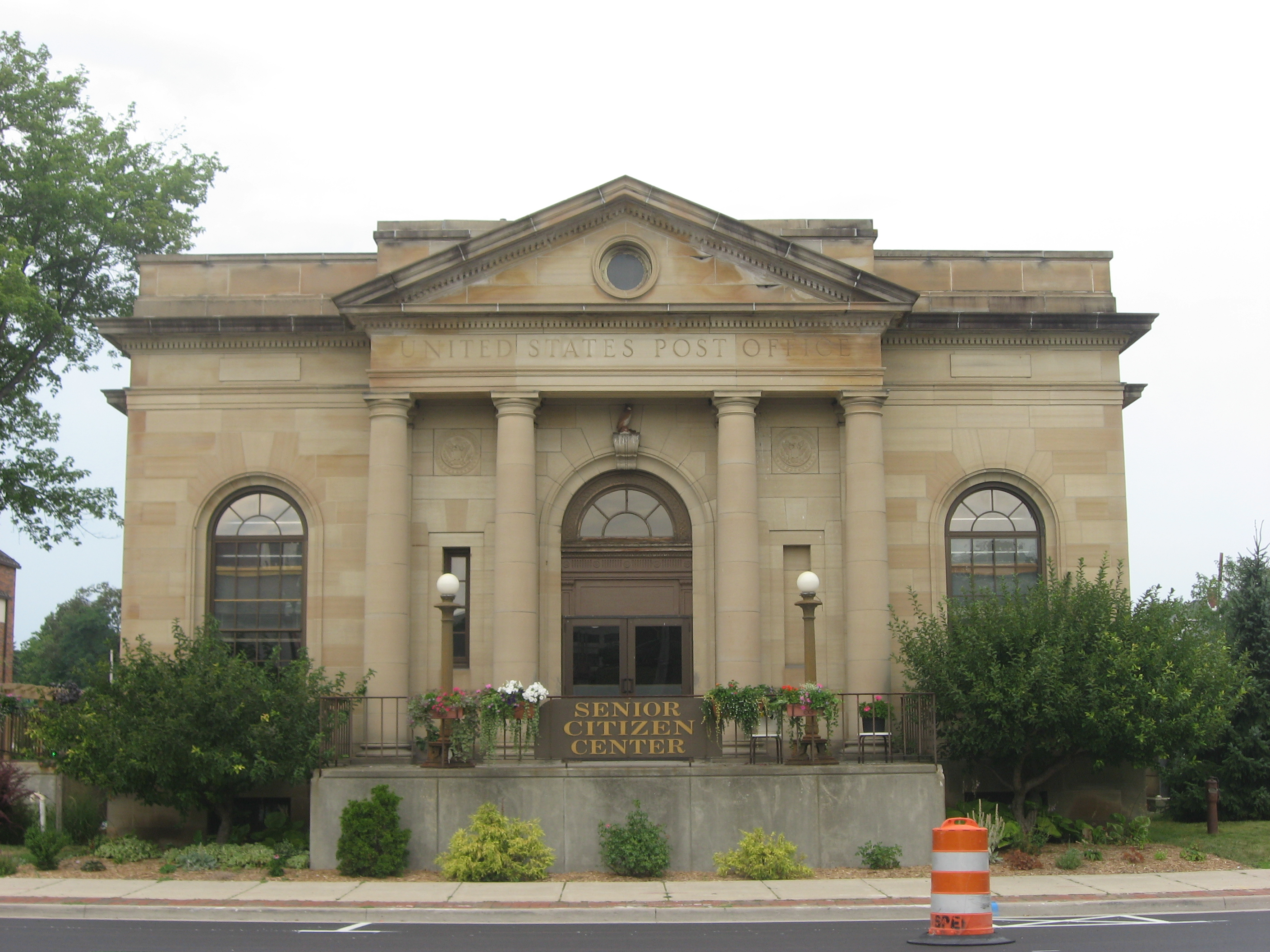
United States Post Office (later Senior Citizen's Center), Bowling Green, Ohio, 1913

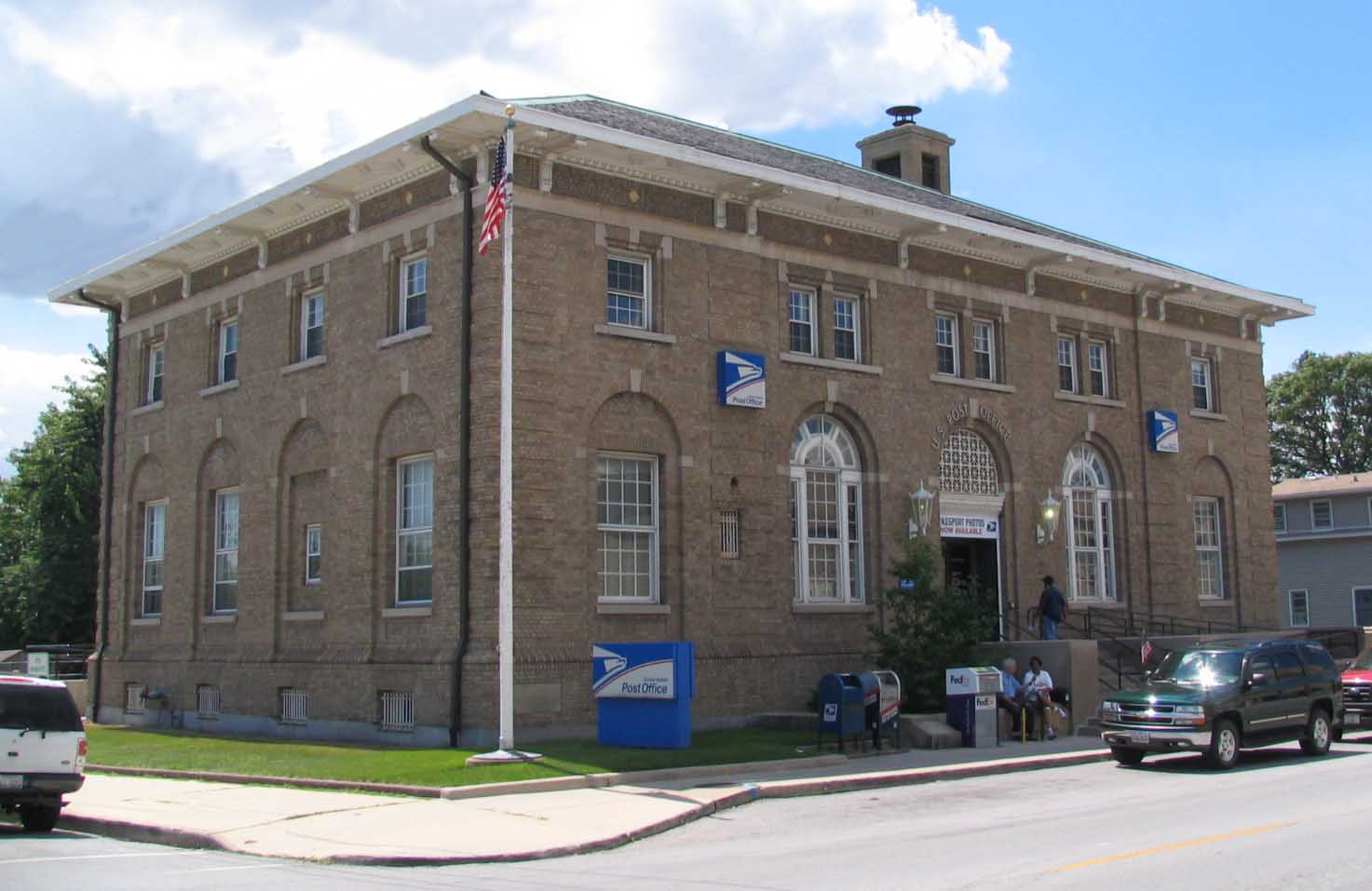
United States Post Office, Blue Island, Illinois, 1914

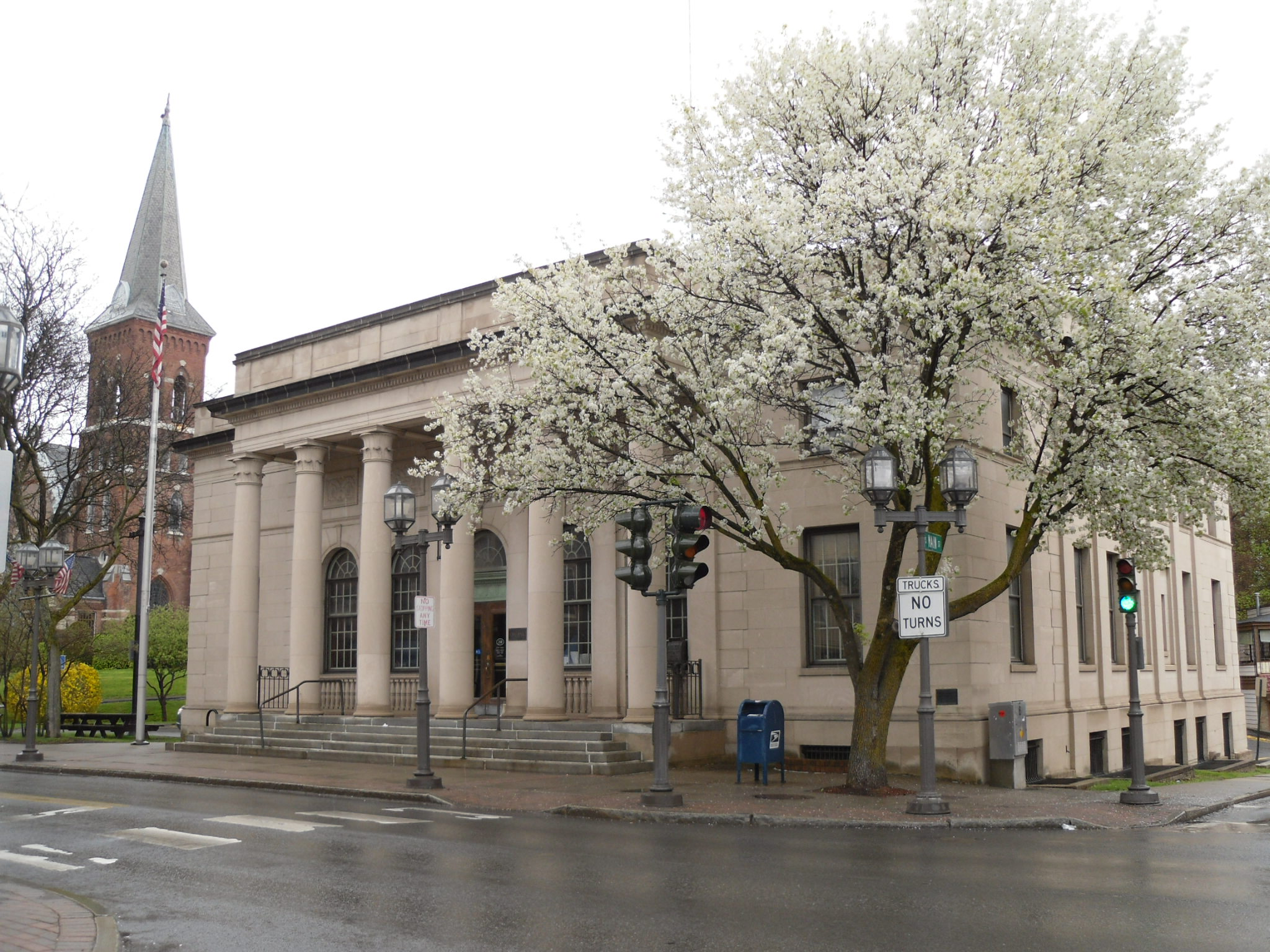
United States Post Office, Oneonta, New York, 1915

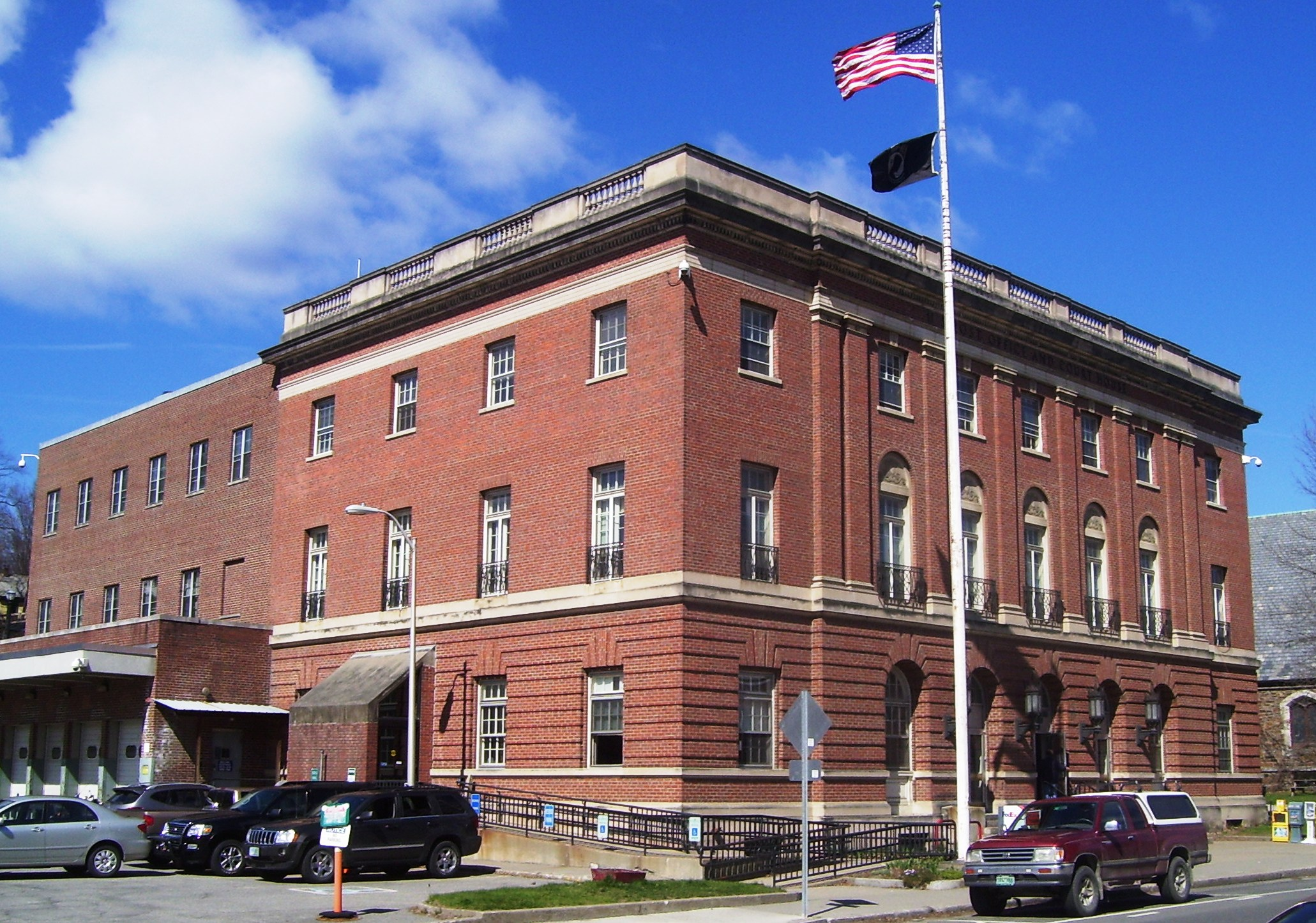
United States Post Office and Courthouse, Brattleboro, Vermont, 1915

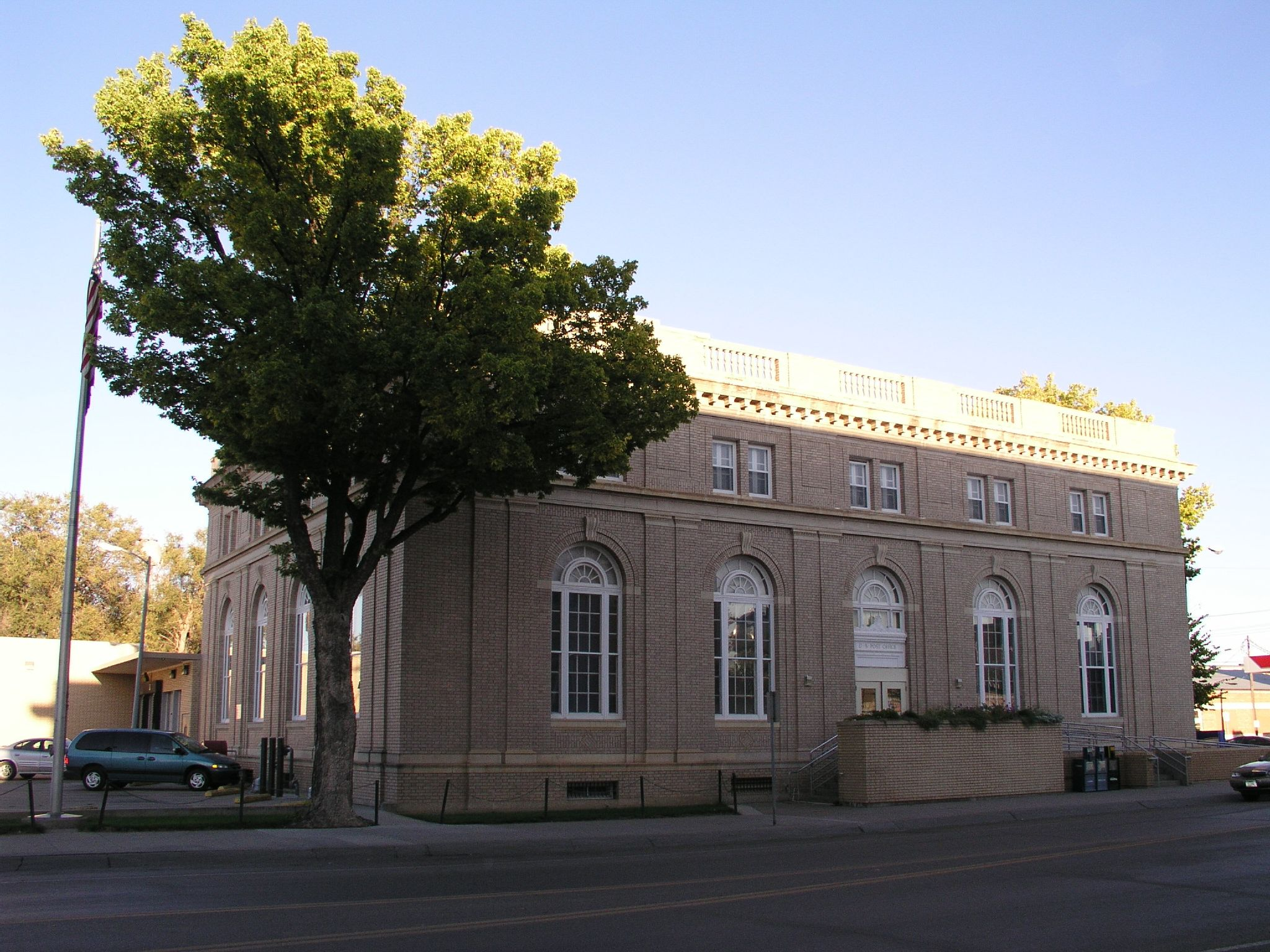
United States Post Office, Miles City, Montana, 1916

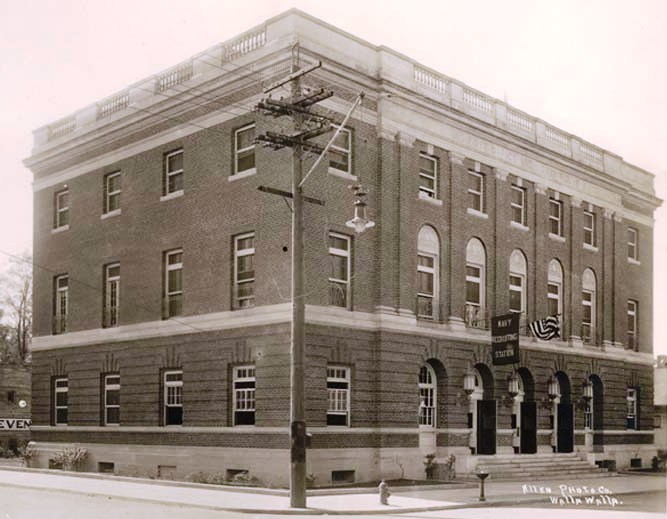
United States Post Office and Courthouse, Pendleton, Oregon, 1916

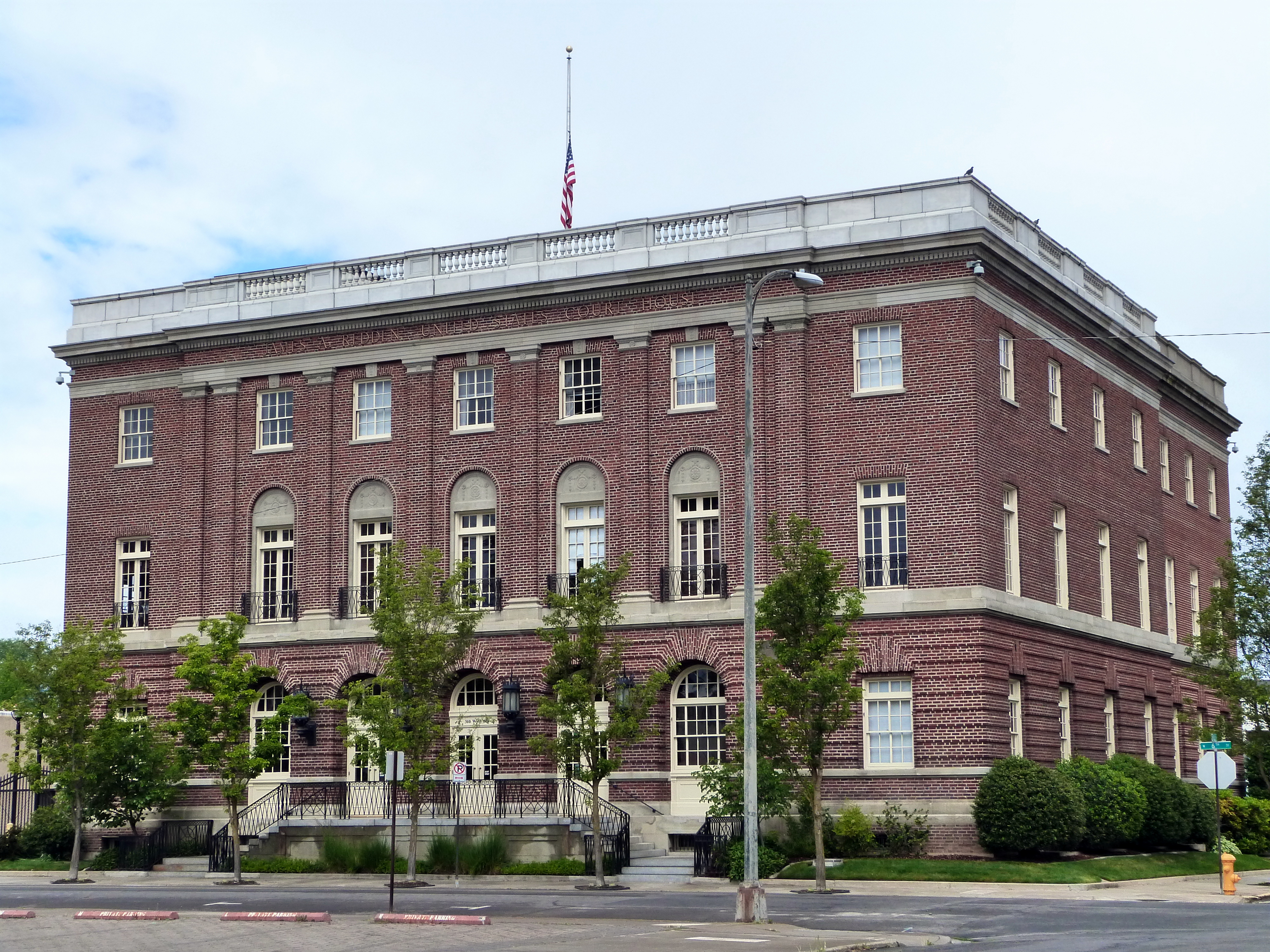
James A. Redden Federal Courthouse, Medford, Oregon, 1916

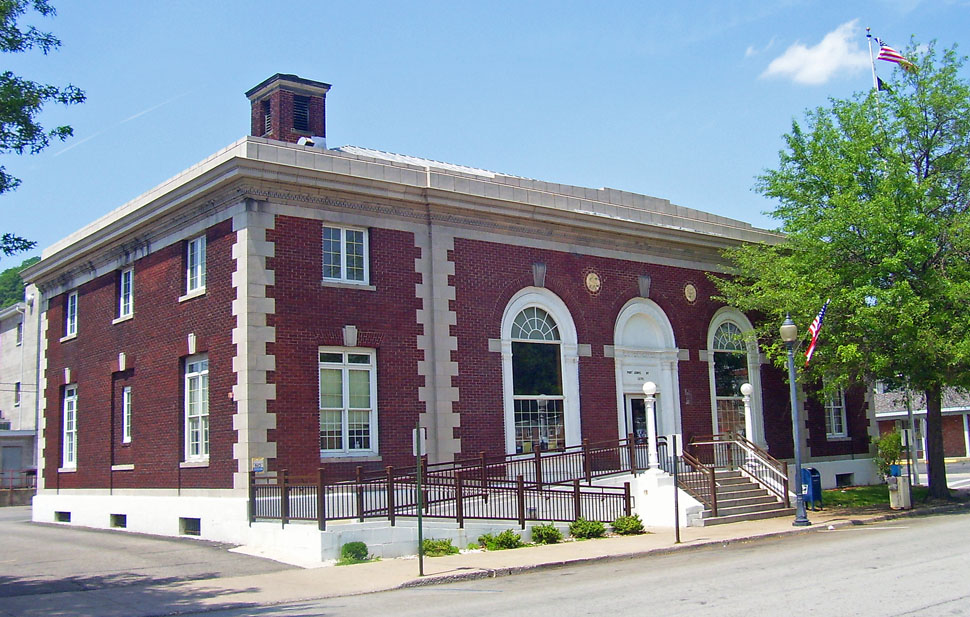
United States Post Office, Port Jervis, New York, c.1920

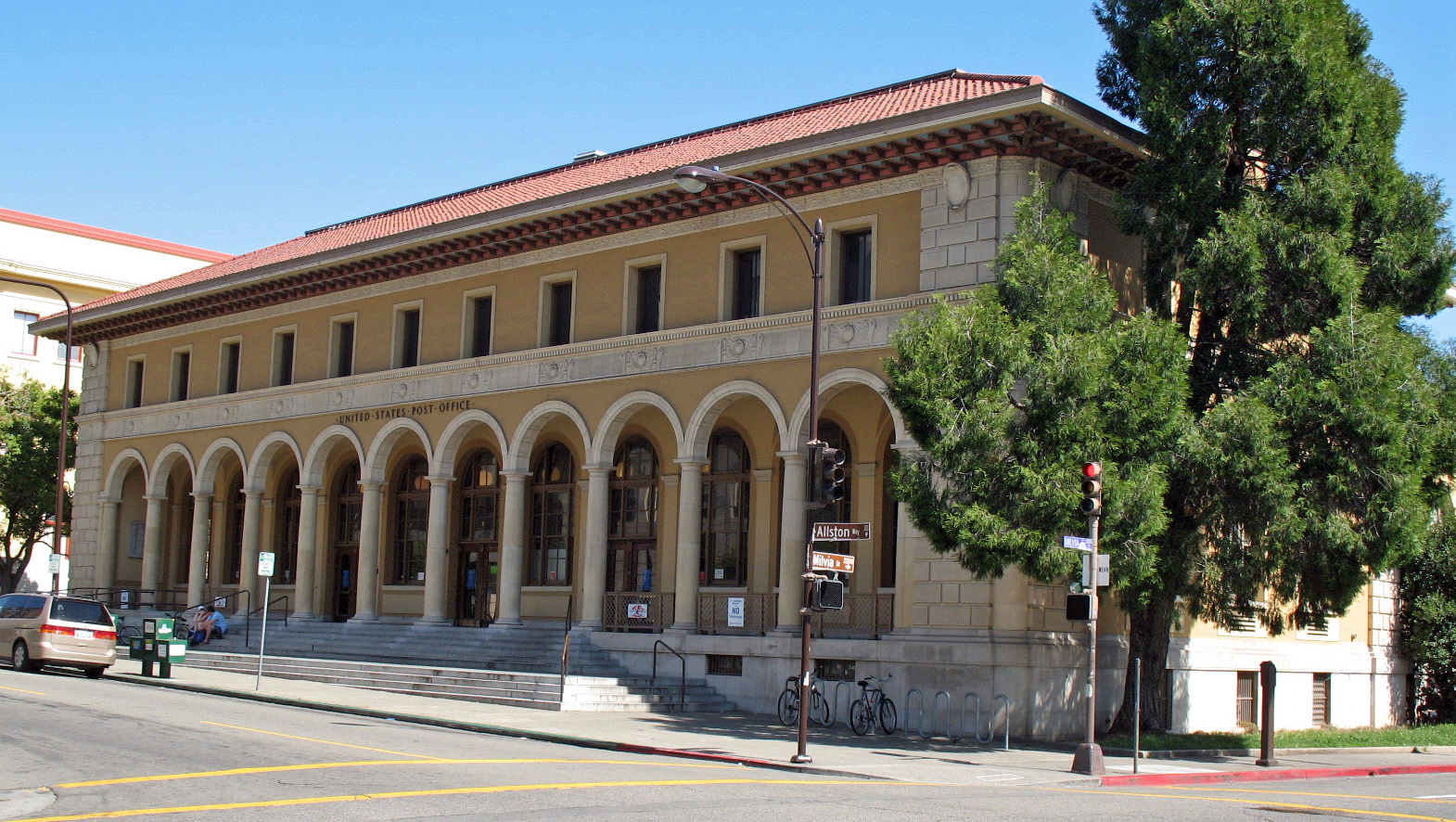
U.S. Post Office, Berkeley, California, 1914

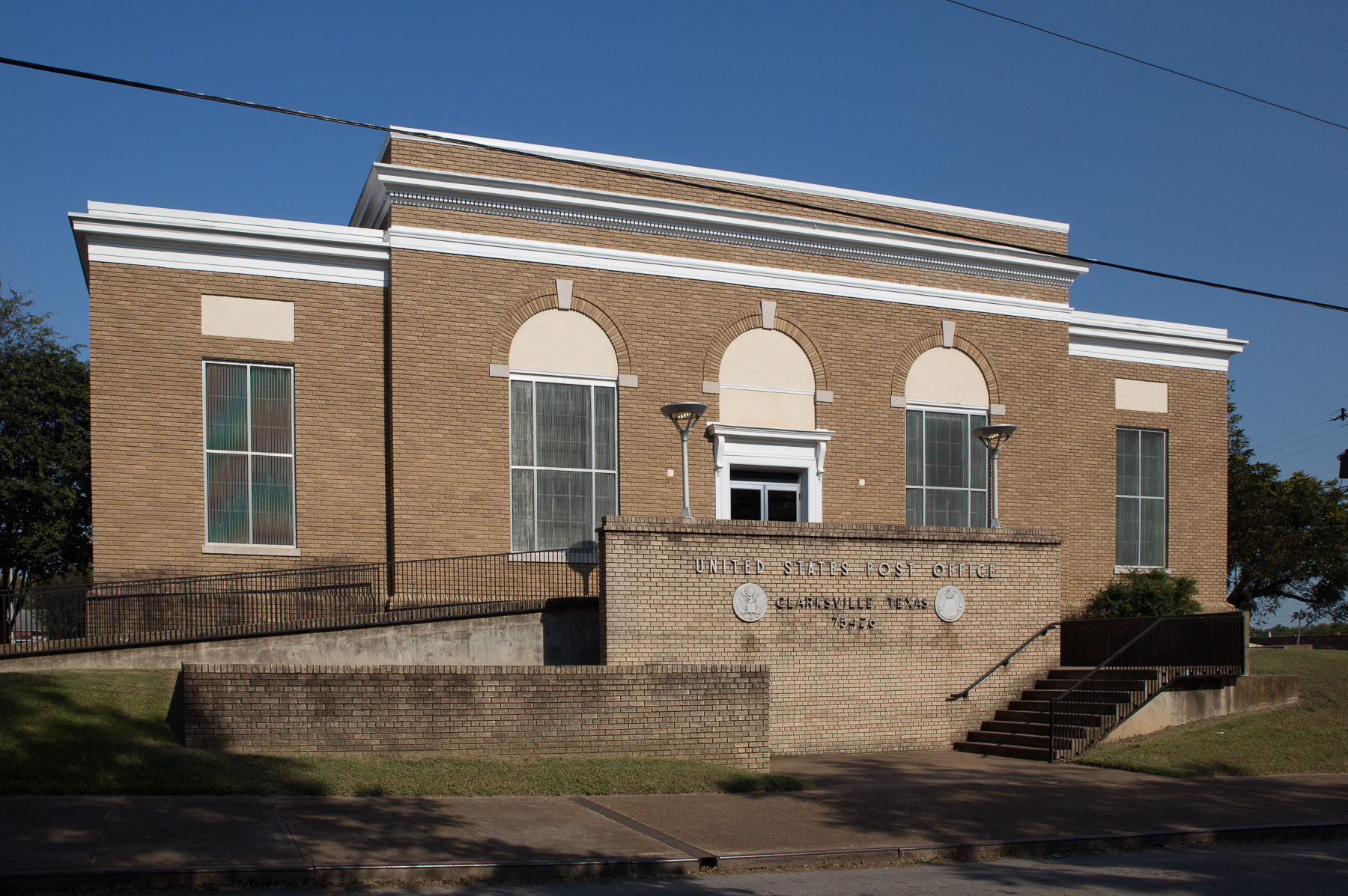
United States Post Office, Clarksville, Texas, 1914

Preceded by James Knox Taylor	Office of the Supervising Architect; 1913–1914	Succeeded by James A. Wetmore
