= James A. Wetmore =

American architect (1863-1940)

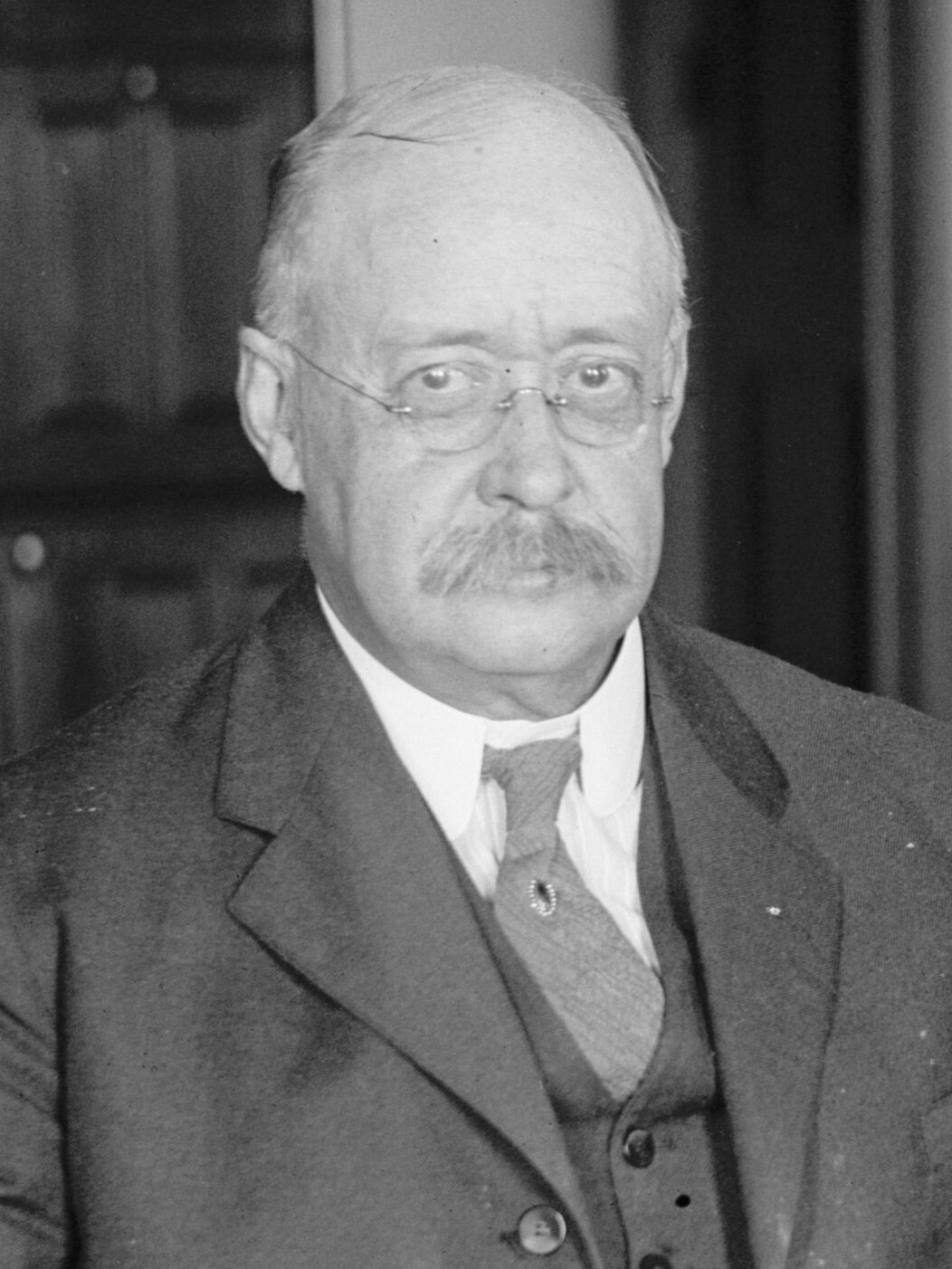
- Wetmore in 1926

Acting Supervising Architect of the United States
- In office 1915–1933
- Preceded by: Oscar Wenderoth
- Succeeded by: Louis A. Simon

Personal details
- Born: November, 1863 Bath, New York
- Died: March 14, 1940 (aged 76) Coral Gables, Florida
- Profession: Lawyer, civil-servant

James Alfonso Wetmore (November 1863 – March 14, 1940) was an American lawyer and administrator, best known as the Acting Supervising Architect of the U.S. Office of the Supervising Architect of the Treasury Department from 1915 through 1933.

Wetmore is frequently and incorrectly described as the "architect" of the many federal buildings that bear his name. He was a long-time civil servant in the Treasury Department, and was not a professional architect. As Supervising Architect, he managed a staff of nearly 1700 architects and draftsmen who designed at least 2000 federal government buildings, including courthouses and post offices.

== Background ==
Wetmore was born in Bath, New York, to Justus Ford and Cornelia (Brownell) Wetmore and grew up in Hornell. He completed high school, worked in the Netherlands and Scotland, and then as a court stenographer at the Department of the Interior from 1885. He transferred to the Treasury Department in 1893. Wetmore took night classes at George Washington University Law School, earning a degree in 1896, when his position was assistant chief clerk. In November 1896, he was promoted to head of the Law and Records Division of the Office of the Supervising Architect, within the Treasury Department in Washington, D.C., by President Grover Cleveland. He replaced Judge Fleming, who was removed due to his involvement in the free silver movement. Wetmore held that position until 1911. In June 1907, he was appointed by President Theodore Roosevelt, along with four other officials, to a special committee to "fully investigate and examine into the forms of contracts used by the various departments, bureaus and offices of the government."

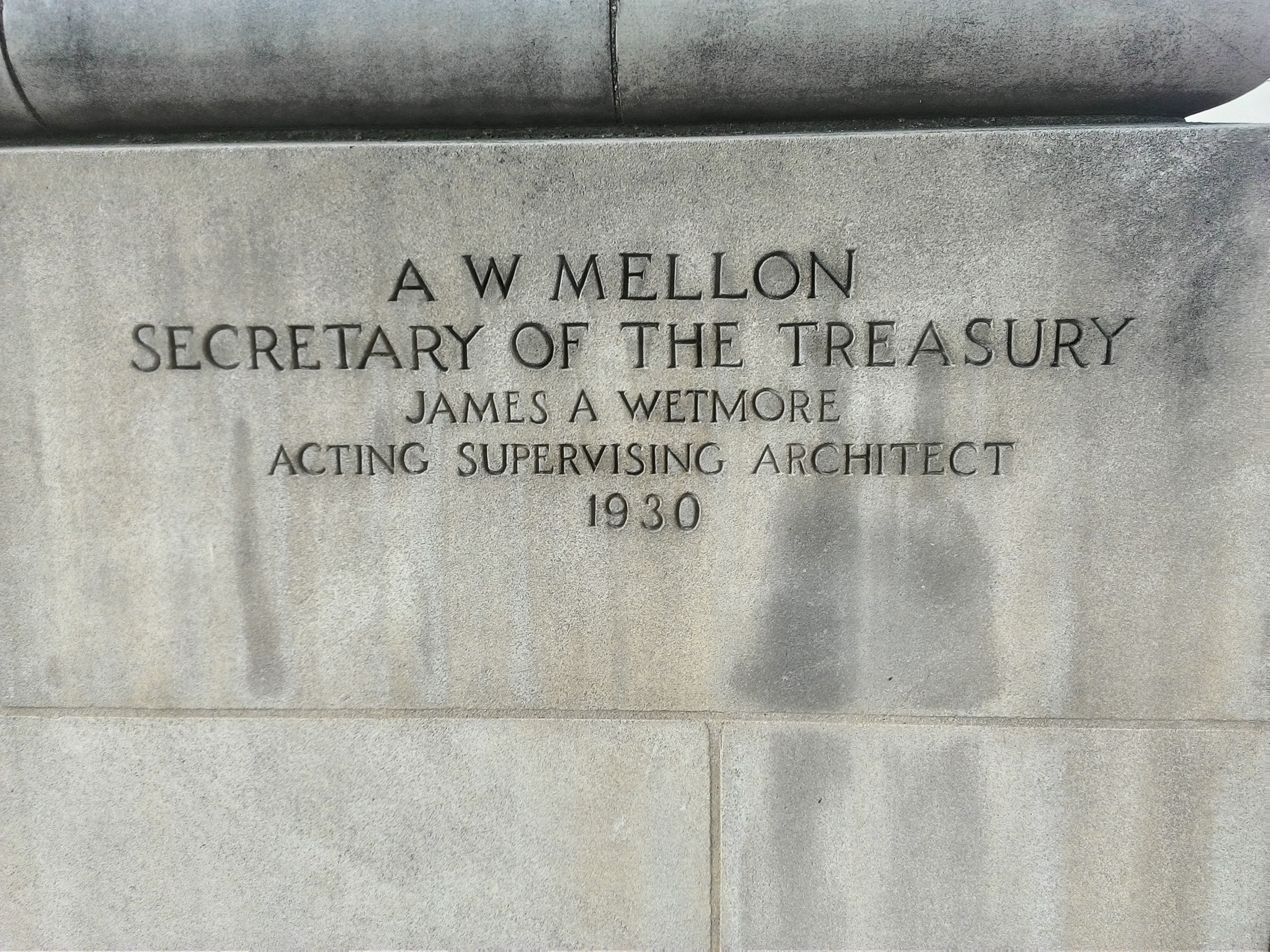
Cornerstone of a Courthouse and Post Office showing Wetmore's name (Prescott, Arizona)

== Office of the Supervising Architect ==
In 1911, he became the executive officer to the supervising architect, James Knox Taylor. He was the EO, which put him in charge of all non-technical operations of the office, under Taylor, and then under his successor Oscar Wenderoth who took over in 1912. For a period in 1912 after the resignation of Taylor, Wetmore was acting supervising architect until Wenderoth relocated to Washington.

Wenderoth resigned in April 1915 to return to private practice in a firm that specialized in designing bank interiors. Following Wenderoth's departure in 1915, Wetmore was named as the acting supervising architect. He held this position for almost twenty years, until his retirement in 1933. He initially believed the position would be temporary until an architect was selected to be the supervising architect. However, he had a thorough understanding of the operation of the office and worked well with its architects, which accounted for his remaining in the position. Although outsiders did not always understand why a lawyer was running the office, the duties were primarily administrative; supervising architects did not require him to be trained as one. During much of his tenure, Louis A. Simon was responsible for the direction of much of the actual design work. Simon eventually succeeded Wetmore as head of the office.

Wetmore was interested in architecture, and influenced government building design by promoting standardization. In collaboration with William Gibbs McAdoo, the Secretary of the Treasury from 1913 to 1918, buildings were to be designed with "scale, materials and finishes" that directly reflected their "location, prominence and income". This push to standardization of public building design was in conflict with the Tarsney Act, which permitted private architects to design federal buildings after being selected in a competition under the supervision of the Supervising Architect. The act, under which several Taylor-era buildings were designed, was repealed in 1913 as it was felt that designing buildings with government architects would most efficiently cause the desired standardization.

As supervising architect, he often spoke to the Society of Constructors of Federal Buildings. He addressed the 1917 annual convention by reporting that "The Treasury Department completed plans and contracts for a public building every four days and each building has averaged a cost of $50,000." He also noted that almost 90% of these were post offices.

=== McAdoo Classification ===
Buildings were to be designed with specific criteria. A "Class A" building was one that was on a major street of a major city, surrounded by expensive buildings, and expected to generate at least $800,000 in revenue. These buildings would have marble or granite exteriors, marble interiors, ornamental bronze, and other similar fixtures.

A small post office with revenue of under $15,000 would be made of brick, with standard wood windows and doors and would appear "ordinary". Critics felt the system would make public buildings too plain.

=== World War I ===
During World War I, much of the work of the office stopped due to the priorities of the war. Construction was postponed except for the completion of building already under construction, and of new facilities such as hospitals, quarantine and immigration stations that aided the war effort. At McAdoo's direction, Wetmore tried to keep the staff together but many were lost to the armed forces and other agencies..

=== Post-war era ===
Construction resumed, although costs had escalated and buildings could not be constructed at the costs estimated before the war. Work did proceed and the demand for new buildings increased. Wetmore was now serving under a new Treasury Secretary, Andrew W. Mellon. Mellon, who like Wetmore, was personally interested in architecture, kept Wetmore in his "acting" position because he "had been ably performing the duties for several years". Wetmore continued to advocate the use of government architects, in opposition to private architects who wanted to be able to work on federal projects. He said the use of private architects was appropriate "only in exceptional cases."

== Federal Real Estate Board ==
Wetmore was also named the chairman (Surveyor General of Real Estate) of the Federal Real Estate Board after its creation in 1922. The board was created to manage the government's vast real estate holdings and reduce expenses.

== Legacy and honors ==
Wetmore's name is inscribed on the cornerstones of approximately 2000 federal buildings that were designed during his tenure that spanned the administrations of Wilson, Harding, Coolidge, Hoover, and into Franklin Roosevelt's. Time magazine said his name appeared more than that of any other US citizen. At his insistence, since he was not an architect, his title, both in usage and as inscribed, was always "Acting" Supervising Architect out of respect for the work of architects.

He was most proud of the cornerstone of the post office built in 1931 in his birthplace of Bath, New York. He laid this cornerstone himself and retained the engraved trowel as a souvenir.

Some of the buildings where his name can be found are:

- United States Court House (Des Moines, Iowa), 1928
- Federal Building and United States Courthouse (Albuquerque, New Mexico), 1930
- U.S. Post Office and Courthouse (Baltimore, Maryland), 1930
- Alaska State Capitol, Juneau, Alaska, 1931
- U.S. Post Office (Medina, New York), 1931–1932
- Clarkson S. Fisher Federal Building and United States Courthouse, Trenton, New Jersey, 1932
- Las Vegas Post Office and Courthouse, Las Vegas, Nevada, 1933
- Chehalis Post Office, Chehalis, Washington, 1934
- United States Post Office in Aurora, Illinois

During World War II the Liberty ship SS James A. Wetmore was built in Brunswick, Georgia, and named in his honor.

== Personal life ==
He married Harriet Blye around 1883; she died before his retirement. They had two children, a daughter Viola and a son William. During his career with the government, he lived in both Takoma Park, Maryland, and Washington. After his retirement, he moved to Coral Gables, Florida, in 1934 with his second wife, Anna Polk Wetmore, where he died in 1940. Wetmore was an officer in the Masonic organization and attained its highest rank, a 33rd-degree Mason.

| Preceded by Oscar Wenderoth | Office of the Supervising Architect; 1915–1933 | Succeeded by Louis A. Simon |
