= Neal A. Melick =

American engineer

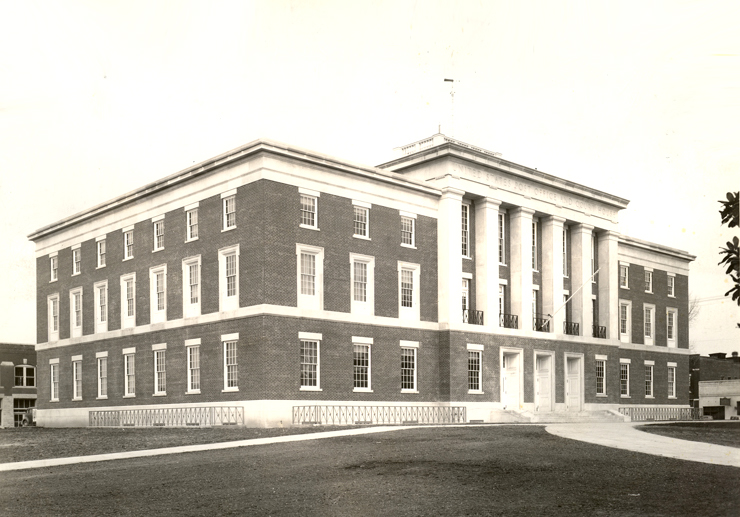
Fort Smith US Post Office and Courthouse

Neal A. Melick was an engineer who worked for the United States federal government. Melick was the supervising engineer for many federal construction projects. He is credited with a number of buildings now listed on the U.S. National Register of Historic Places, often in conjunction with Louis A. Simon serving as supervising architect.

During the World War II war-time rearrangements of public efforts under the Federal Works Agency (FWA), Melick was the superintendent of construction of U.S. public buildings.

== Works ==
His works include:

- United States Bullion Depository, Fort Knox (with Louis A. Simon as Supervising Architect)
- Bronx General Post Office (Thomas H. Ellett, architect designer; Louis A. Simon, supervising architect)
- Chilton Post Office, 57 E. Main St. Chilton, Wisconsin (with Louis A. Simon), Colonial Revival architecture, NRHP-listed
- United States Post Office–Adel, Georgia, 115 E. 4th St. Adel, Georgia (with Louis A. Simon), Colonial Revival, NRHP-listed
- Berlin Post Office, 122 S. Pearl St. Berlin, Wisconsin (Simon, Louis A. and Melick, Neal A.), NRHP-listed
- Columbus Post Office, 211 S. Dickason Blvd. Columbus, Wisconsin (Simon, Louis A. and Melick), Neal A., NRHP-listed
- Edgerton Post Office, 104 N. Swift St. Edgerton, Wisconsin (Simon, Louis A. and Melick, Neal A.), NRHP-listed
- Elkhorn Post Office, 102 E. Walworth St. Elkhorn, Wisconsin (Simon, Louis A. and Melick, Neal A.), NRHP-listed
- Fort Smith US Post Office and Courthouse, now aka Judge Isaac C. Parker Federal Building, 30 S. Sixth St. Fort Smith, Arkansas (Melick, Neal A.), Louis A. Simon, et al.) built 1937, NRHP-listed
- Kewaunee Post Office, 119 Ellis St. Kewaunee, Wisconsin Melick, Neal A., NRHP-listed
- Lancaster Post Office, 236 W. Maple St. Lancaster, Wisconsin Simon, Louis A. and Melick, Neal A., NRHP-listed
- Medford Post Office, 304 S. Main St. Medford, Wisconsin Melick, Neal A., NRHP-listed
- Naco Border Station, 106 D St. Naco, Arizona Melick, Neal A., NRHP-listed
- Neillsville Post Office, 619 Hewett St. Neillsville, Wisconsin Simon, Louis A. and Melick, Neal A., NRHP-listed
- Prairie du Chien Post Office, 120 S. Beaumont Rd. Prairie du Chien, Wisconsin Simon, Louis A. and Melick Neal A., NRHP-listed
- Reedsburg Post Office, 215 N. Walnut St. Reedsburg, Wisconsin Simon, Louis and Melick, Neal A., NRHP-listed
- Shawano Post Office, 235 S. Main St. Shawano, Wisconsin Simon, Louis A. and Melick Neal A., NRHP-listed
- St. Albans Post Office, 202 Sixth Ave. St. Albans, West Virginia Melick, Neil A., NRHP-listed
- United States Post Office (Metuchen, New Jersey), 360 Main St. Metuchen Borough, New Jersey Melick, Neal A., NRHP-listed
- United States Post Office-Decatur, Georgia, 141 Trinity Place Decatur, Georgia Melick, Neal A., NRHP-listed
- US Post Office, 17 E. Jackson Ave. Ripley, Tennessee Melick, Neal A., NRHP-listed
- US Post Office, 81 N. Forest St. Camden, Tennessee (Melick, Neal), NRHP-listed
- US Post Office (Philadelphia), Old, 523 Main St. Philadelphia, Mississippi Melick, Neal A., NRHP-listed
- US Post Office-Main, Morford St. and Court Sq. McMinnville, Tennessee Melick, Neal, NRHP-listed
- Walnut Ridge Post Office, Old, 225 W. Main St. Walnut Ridge, Arkansas Melick, Neal A., NRHP-listed
- Waupaca Post Office, 306 S. Main St. Waupaca, Wisconsin Simon, Louis A. and Melick, Neal A., NRHP-listed
- West Allis Post Office, 7440 W. Greenfield Ave. West Allis, Wisconsin Melick, Neal A., NRHP-listed
- West Bend Post Office, 607 Elm St. West Bend, Wisconsin simon, Louis A. and Melick, Neal A., NRHP-listed
- Whitewater Post Office, 213 Center St. Whitewater, Wisconsin Melick, Neal A., NRHP-listed
