= Chicago and West Towns Bus Co. =

Defunct street transit company in Chicago

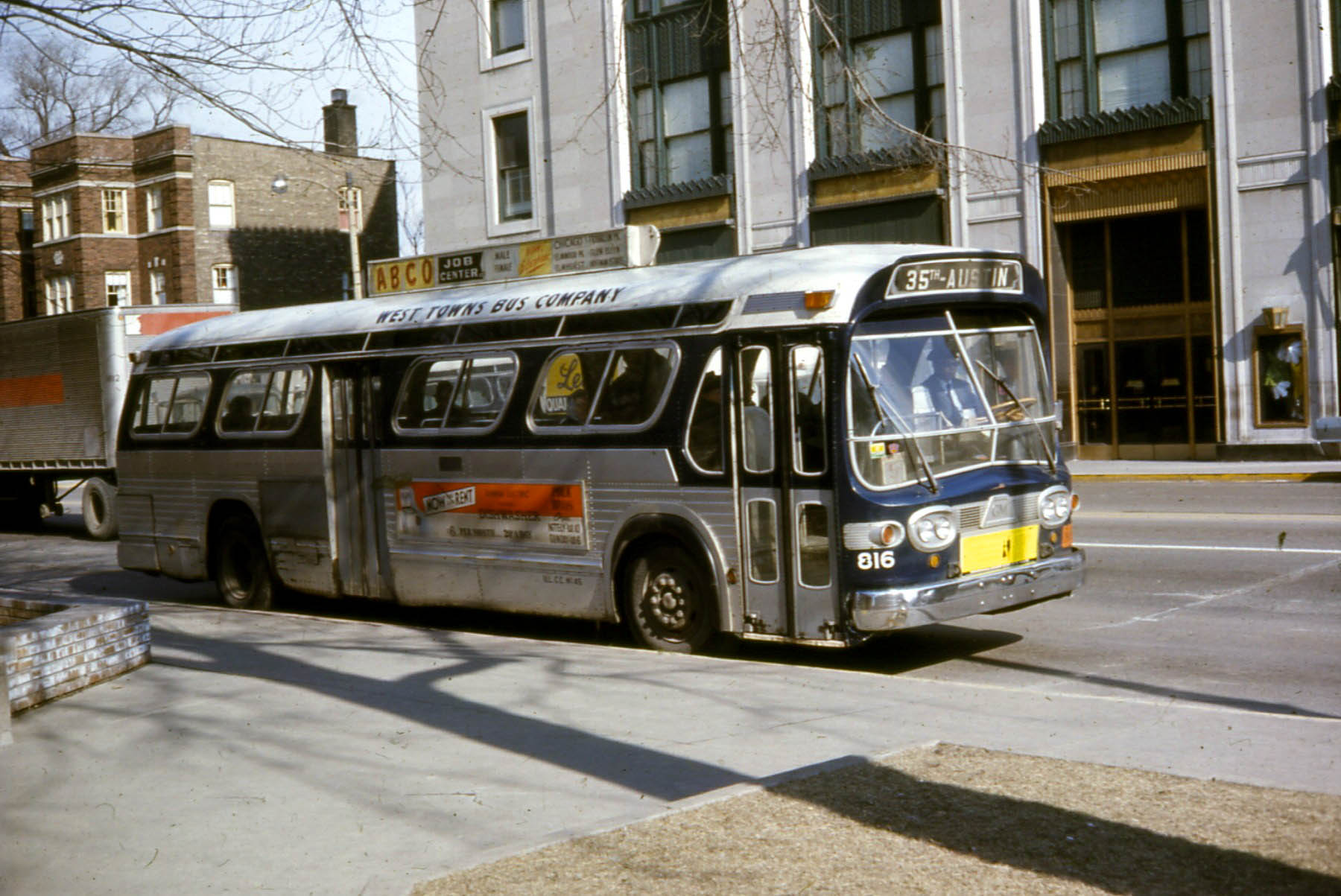
- Chicago and West Towns # 816
- Founded: July 18, 1913
- Headquarters: Oak Park, Illinois
- Locale: Northeastern Illinois
- Service area: Cook and DuPage counties
- Service type: Bus
- Routes: 19 (1981)
- Fleet: 107 buses (1981)
- Operator: ATE (1981-1985)

The Chicago and West Towns Bus Company was a street transit company in the near-west suburbs of Chicago, Illinois. It was incorporated in 1913 to operate suburban streetcar companies. When it was bought by the Regional Transit Authority (RTA) in 1981, it had 107 buses and was operating 11 of 19 routes (service had been suspended on 8 routes due to an RTA funding crisis). Some routes were still in service in 2022 as the Pace West Division.

== History ==
The Chicago and West Towns Railway Co. (West Towns) was incorporated on July 15, 1913, to buy streetcar lines in suburban Cook County. It included tracks in an area between Chicago Avenue on the North, the Chicago city limits on the East, Ogden Avenue on the South, and as far West as La Grange. They would go on to buy several bus companies in the 1930s and expand their own bus service, which would replace all streetcars by 1948. They renamed themselves the Chicago and West Towns Bus Co. in 1956. In 1963, they bought Leyden Motor Coach Co., in 1981, they were bought by the RTA, and in 1985, they were merged into the Pace West Division.

=== Background ===
In 1881, the financier Charles T. Yerkes began buying a number of streetcar lines. By 1900, he had a near monopoly of streetcars (and rapid transit) on Chicago's North Side, West Side, and Near West suburbs. He created a complex maze of corporations, often with questionable financing and business practices. All of West Towns' predecessor companies had been controlled by Yerkes interests.

When Yerkes sold most of his Chicago interests and moved away in 1899, he left a network of financially weak companies behind. Chicago began to re-organize their streetcar services. The Consolidated Traction Ordinance of October 10, 1910, required the Yerkes suburban lines to be separated from their Chicago operations.

On November 21, 1910, the suburban streetcar lines were bought by County Traction Co., which then bought the Suburban Railroad (a separate Yerkes company) on February 27, 1912, and was sold to the non-Yerkes West Towns on December 27, 1913.

=== The beginning ===
The West Towns was incorporated on July 15, 1913. It was organized by John J. Cummins and his brother, Walter J. Cummings, was its first president. They owned a streetcar manufacturing company and were familiar with the business. John sometimes called the purchase price a "joke". Despite the problems, he was able to organize the company and make a profit every year until 1931, after the Great Depression began.

The West Towns had different operating conditions than adjoining Chicago as a smaller system through less densely populated areas. Fares were usually more expensive for inferior service. Many of the lines were originally connected with Chicago routes until 1910, when Chicago's ordinance separated them. With no fare or transfer arrangement with Chicago a passenger would have to walk to change cars and then pay a separate, and higher, West Towns fare in order to continue traveling on the same street outside the city.

They ran through a number of different suburbs and needed franchises with each one. The different suburbs often had different interests and negotiated individually so one suburb could jeopardize service for others.

Many of the lines had been built in "streetcar suburbs", where the streetcars are run through largely undeveloped area, counting on the service to create development and new passengers. This is an advantage to the developer but requires running a low-rider line until the development happens.

=== Streetcars ===
County Transit was not operating when it was bought, a labor strike had stopped all service. Management met the union's demands for equal pay as Chicago streetcar employees.

Arrangements for franchises were made, except with Forest Park, who was a problem for the West Towns. At the same time, $290,750 was spent on improvements to infrastructure. On July 13, 1913, partial operation resumed.

Into the 1920s, the suburbs continued to negotiate separately. In 1923, the Illinois Commerce Commission ruled that the individual suburbs had no control over routes and the West Towns would now deal directly with the Illinois Commerce Commission. With the new Ill.C.C. ruling, the West Towns began applying for new routes, most with buses. They petitioned for ten new routes in 1923, eight more in 1925, and four more in 1926. From two buses in 1923, the West Towns went to 46 in 1930.

In 1929, the great depression caused net income to fall from $138,080 in 1929 to -$37,982 in 1931. The company went into bankruptcy and was reorganized as the "Chicago and West Towns Railway Incorporated". The company survived but continued to lose money all through the 1930s.

1935 showed a change to buses coming. In 1934, streetcar trackage was at its maximum, 479.65 miles (771.92 km) miles, in 1935, with the purchase of 27 buses, trackage was reduced to 73.1 miles (117.6 km). From this time on, streetcar service would be replaced with busses, the last streetcars ran in 1948.

On December 2, 1936, a fire at the Lake St. car-barn burned 18 passenger cars and some other equipment. The West Towns leased six streetcars from Chicago Railways (a former Yerkes Chicago company) between December 2, 1936, and returned March 14, 1937.

In 1941, World War II war production and ridership increased, net earnings went from -$87,843 in 1941 to $377,433 in 1943 (the best year in the history of the company).

Because of the war, many routes were changed and new ones were added. Operations were changed, stops were reduced, and a new garage was opened to reduce mileage of the buses.

West Towns began buying 27-passenger buses in 1941 and the War Production Board approved continued sales from 1942 until 1945, the last order was filled in 1946. In 1944, 32, 36, and 38 passenger models began arriving and continued until 1950.

=== Buses take over ===
After World War II, the West Towns' equipment, which had been neglected in the 1930s, then used to maximum capacity during the war, was worn out. The rolling stock, both streetcars and buses, needed replacing and the infrastructure need major repairs and upgrades. Like most other streetcar systems in the US, the cost was not practical and all streetcars were replaced with buses by 1948.

With the number of replacement buses needed nationally, larger 44/45 (35 ft (10.67 m) long) and 51 (40 ft (12.19 m)) long passenger models were an advantage. West Towns only bought 45 passenger buses new after 1949, when the first GMC TDH4509 "old look"" series arrived. They later bought used 53 passenger and narrow models.

On November 29, 1956, with the end of streetcar service, the company was renamed The Chicago and West Towns Bus Company.

In the 1960s, the GMC TDH-4517 and -4519 "new look" series became the standard buses and other makes or models were bought used. In 1963 and 1964, at the time Leyden was acquired, they bought 19 used TDH-4509s.

In 1963, Leyden Motor Coach was bought. They had often longer routes north and west of the West Towns. Leyden had a route west to Wheaton in DuPage County and north to O'Hare Airport.

In the 1970s, action for public operation began. On March 19, 1974, a referendum was passed creating the RTA and on June 28, 1974, the last legal challenge to the RTA was decided by the Illinois Supreme Court. On December 19, 1974, the West Towns received their first $149,000 and would receive increasing amounts through 1978. The structure of the RTA, financing the private companies, failed. On May 30, 1981, all service was stopped on the West Towns until August 5, when reduced service resumed with a third of the drivers working.

In November 1981, the RTA purchased the West Towns, and began operating it with the management company ATE, who owned and operated a number of bus companies nationwide. This didn't fix the problems, the RTA was restructured in 1983 and the West Towns became the Pace West Division. After seventy years, the West Towns was no longer in business.

=== The companies ===
The Cicero and Proviso Railway was incorporated on February 15, 1889. The first West Towns company, they would serve the area of Cicero and Proviso townships. Their first route was a horsecar line on Madison St. with a loop north to Lake St. Electric power began on February 12, 1891. Both Madison and Lake Sts. would be extended and a number of other lines were added, by 1895 they had 17.92 miles of track, most double-tracked. It was bought by Consolidated Traction on February 27, 1899, spun-off to County Traction on December 27, 1910, and bought by the West Towns in 1913.

The Ogden Street Railway was incorporated on October 1, 1891, to serve an area around Ogden Avenue west to Lyons. It was bought by Consolidated Traction on February 27, 1899, spun-off to County Traction on December 27, 1910, and bought by the West Towns in 1913.

The Suburban Railroad Company was incorporated on May 17, 1885, as an electric railroad, or interurban, not a street railway. They built the LaGrange line, originally from Cicero Avenue and Harrison Street, west to Harlem Avenue. Later, they would route it on Cermak Road from Cicero Avenue west to Harlem Avenue, then south. They also had a north–south line on Laramie Avenue. The Suburban was bought by County Traction on February 27, 1912, and became part of the West Towns in 1913.

The Chicago Consolidated Traction Co. was incorporated on February 29, 1899, to unify eight streetcar companies (seven were controlled by Yerkes). As a result of the Traction Ordinance of 1910, they sold their operations to County Traction (outside Chicago) and Chicago Railways (inside Chicago) on December 27, 1910.

The County Traction Co. was incorporated on November 21, 1910, to buy the Yerkes suburban streetcar operations from Consolidated Traction Co. On February 27, 1912, they also bought the separate (but still a Yerkes company) Suburban Railroad. It was sold and merged into the West Towns in 1913.

Speedway Auto Bus Co. was incorporated on July 1, 1921, to serve the new government hospital (named Edward Hines Jr. Hospital on October 31, 1921) in the area called "Speedway" after a race-track that was there before World War I. It opened the line on September 9, 1921. In June 1922, they extended service before they had permission from the Illinois Commerce Commission. Their application, and five later ones, were all contested and denied. They could operate charter service but Hines was their only regular route. They were bought by the West Towns on May 5, 1930.

Metropolitan Motor Coach Co. (the Marigold Line) started with two small companies providing local service in Oak Park. Northwestern Transit bought Oak Park Motor Transport in 1921, when both companies were only months old. They served local streets that were not served by the West Towns. In 1928, both companies were bought by Metropolitan and in 1935, they were merged. Never very profitable, Metropolitan was sold to the West Towns on September 5, 1935.

Leyden Motor Coach operated express routes north of The West Towns and the two companies sometimes competed for routes. Leyden was seized by the federal government for unpaid taxes in 1963 and the Illinois Commerce Commission issued an emergency order for the West Towns to acquire them. The West Towns started operating Leyden routes on August 7, 1963.

Regional Transportation Authority (RTA) was created on December 13, 1973, to fund area transit districts and private companies. At first, it just funded the private companies, but that led to large cost-over-runs and a funding crisis. All service on the West Towns stopped on May 30, 1981, and less than half the service was restored on August 5. In November 1981, the RTA bought the West Towns and had ATE Management operate it, but the funding crisis continued. In 1983, the RTA was completely re-organized with all the bus companies merged into the Pace West Division.

ATE Management and Service Co. (ATE) is a spin-off from a holding company for buses. They were hired in 1981 to operate the RTA's suburban bus companies.

Pace is the brand name of the Suburban Bus Division of the RTA. In 1983, it began operating all suburban buses. Some West Towns routes have continued in service, often with their West Town's route number placed in the 300 series.

== Routes ==
(Not all are shown)

Route #2 - Berwyn-Lyons was opened by the Ogden Street Railroad in 1893. From 25th St. and Cicero Ave. in Cicero, it went west on 25th St. to Central Ave., where it jogged one block south and continued west on 26th St. to Ridgeland. On Ridgeland, they went south to Stanley, southwest to Harlem Ave., and south to Ogden Ave. On Ogden Ave., the line went west to Lawndale Ave. and had a connection with the Chicago and Joliet Electric Railway in Lyons.

Route #4 - La Grange was opened by Suburban Railway Co. in 1895. From just east of Cicero Ave. it went west on 22nd St. (now Cermak Rd.) to Harlem Ave., south to 26th St., and west to Des Plaines Ave. At Des Plaines Ave., it went south and continued on Woodside Rd. to Park Place, where it turned west onto a private right-of-way. It crossed the Des Plaines River, First Ave., and ran through an undeveloped area. In 1934, the area north of the line would become Brookfield Zoo, a high traffic weekend destination. The tracks crossed Salt Creek and went west through a streetcar suburb section of Brookfield, down the median on Monroe Ave., southwest through "Eight Corners" on Broadway Ave., and west on Lincoln. After crossing the Indiana Harbor Belt Railroad, the route turned south and ran on a private right-of-way along the tracks through La Grange Park and into La Grange. At Hillgrove Ave., the line turned west and ended at Brainard Ave. The line was converted to buses on April 4, 1948. Buses ran west on Cermak until Harlem Ave., but then went south on Harlem to 26th St., west to Des Plaines Ave., south to 31st St and west to 1st Ave. There, the buses turned south and ran next to Brookfield Zoo south to Washington St. in Brookfield. Washington St. runs west and turns into Harding Ave. in La Grange Park. At La Grange Rd., the line turned south to La Grange and at Hillgrove, it went west to Brainard Ave.

Route #8 - Veteran's Hospital Edward Hines VA Hospital has had bus service to the Forest Park rapid transit station since it was opened in 1921. Speedway Auto Bus Co. started a route from the Forest Park terminal south to 12th St. (now Roosevelt Rd.) and west to the hospital. Leaving the hospital, the route went north on 5th Ave to the C&NW (now UP)'s Maywood commuter station near Lake St. Over time, the routing has changed and sometimes has been combined with other routes. In 2023, Pace route "308 Medical Center" connects Hines and the adjacent Loyola University Medical Center with the Forest Park terminal.

Route #9 - Lake St. Lake St. was part of the Cicero and Proviso's first horsecar loop with Madison St. Tracks on Lake St. extended from Austin Bvld. west to 25th Ave. in Melrose Park. In 1947, it was converted to buses and extended to Wolf Rd. in Northlake.

Route #10 - Madison St. Madison St. between Pulaski Ave. and Harlem Ave., with a loop north to Lake St., was the Cicero and Proviso Street Railway's first line, opened in 1890. This was a horse-car line until electrified in 1891. From that time, both Madison St. and Lake St. would become major lines. Its tracks went from Austin Bvld. as far as 19th Ave. in Maywood. The line was converted to buses on February 16, 1947, and later extended to La Grange Rd.

Route #13 - St. Charles Rd./Wheaton was a Leyden Coach route. It served the customers of the Chicago Aurora and Elgin Railroad, which ended service on July 3, 1957. It went from Lake St. near Harlem Ave. west to St. Charles Rd. and farther west to Crescent Bvld. and Pennsylvania Ave. through Glen Ellyn. In Wheaton, Pennsylvania Ave turns into College Ave. which connects to Seminary Ave., all westbound. At Cross St., it turned south, crossed the Chicago and Northwestern RR., and looped east one block to the DuPage County Courthouse at Liberty Dr. and Reber St.

Route #14 - O'Hare–Chicago Loop was a Leyden route. The eastern terminal was near the Chicago Loop, it used Garvey Ct. north to Wacker, and then west out on Randolph/Washington to Homan, then jogged onto Madison St. and west to Harlem Ave. On Harlem Ave., it went north to Grand Ave., west to Rose in Franklin Park, and north into Ruby St. in Schiller Park. At Lawrence Ave., the line went west to Mannheim Road and north to O'Hare International Airport.

== Equipment ==
=== Streetcars ===
Company founder John J. Cummings owned a streetcar manufacturer, McGuire-Cummings (Cummings Car and Coach after 1926). All new streetcars were built by them, and many early buses also had bodies by Cummings.

Number	Type	Pass	Year	Notes
1 + 14	Pullman	36	1891	ex-Suburban trailers
101-104	McGuire-Cummings	44		scrapped 1947–1948
105-106	McGuire-Cummings	40	1912	scrapped 1947–1948
107-120	McGuire-Cummings	44	1912	ex-Suburban, 5 burned 1936, scrapped 1944–1948
121-30	McGuire-Cummings	44	1914	1 burned 1936, scrapped 1943–1948
131-137	McGuire-Cummings	44	1918-1919	2 burned 1936, scrapped 1947–1948
138-141	McGuire-Cummings	44	1924	for LaGrange line, 141 at IRM, scrapped 1948
142-147	McGuire-Cummings	44	1924	3 burned 1936, scrapped 1947
148-151	McGuire-Cummings	44	1924	3 burned 1936, 1 scrapped 47
152-159	Cummings Car and Coach	44	1927	used trucks and motors, scrapped 1947–1948
500-503	Pullman	48	1897	es-Suburban trailers
504-521	Pullman	48	1897	ex-Suburban

=== Buses ===
Chicago and West Towns Bus Co. numbered their buses in the order they were received, with few exceptions. The first #13-22 was replaced in kind with the same numbers. The first #315-319 were re-numbered #415-419 to let all Ford models be numbered in series. The #100s were used for miscellaneous vehicles. #3700, 3702, and 3703, bought from the CTA, kept their CTA numbers. Buses bought by the RTA had 8000 series numbers.

Number	Type	Pass	Arrived ( Year )	Notes
1	Mack AB	25	1923	Cummings body
2	Reo W	22	1924	
3-12	Mack AB	25	1924	Cummings bodies
13-22	Reo	21	1925	
13-22 (2nd)	Available T25	22	1929	
23	Cummings	26	1927	gas/electric
24-29	Mack AB	45	1927	
30	Cummings	29	1928	
31-41	Mack AB	45	19??	
42	Pierce-Arrow 33	29	1930	
43	Yellow X	21	1930	ex-Speedway
44	Pierce-Arrow	25	1930	ex-Speedway
45-46	White 50	45	1930	ex-Speedway
47	International 54WC	29	1931	used
48-55	ACF H12S	30	1934	
56-58	Mack AB	45	1935	used, Cummings body
59	Ford A	27	1935	used
60-67	Yellow Z	21	1935	ex-Metro.
68	ACF	29	1935	ex-Metro
69-73	Yellow Y	29/31	1935	ex-Metro.
74-77	ACF	20	1937	
100	Ford	45	1962	School bus
101-110	ACF-Brill C36	36	1960 (1947)	ex-CTA
166	GMC TDH 5304	53	1979 (1965)	
200-209	ACF	29	1935	
210-227	Available WS175P	25	1937	
228-237	ACF 26S	27	1940	
238-252	ACF 31S	31	1940	
253-342	Ford 19/29/69	27	1941-1946	
415-419	Available	25	1936	re-numbered from 315 to 319
435-447	ACF-Brill C36	36	1947	
500-529	GMC TGM 3609	36	1944-1945	
530-569	GMC TGH 3207	32	1947	
600-619	Mack C45	38	1948	#600 converted to diesel
603 (2nd)	GMC TD5303	53	1980 (1967)	ex-South Suburban Safeway
620-621	Mack C45 GT	45	1957(1956)	
622-631	Mack C45 DT	45	1960	
700-744	GMC TDH 4509	38	1948-1949	
745-748	GMC TDH 4509	45	1952	
745-748	GMC TDH 4509	45	1952	
10 x #	ACF-Brill C36	36	1957-1958 (1946)	ex-CTA
751-762	GMC TDH 4509	45	1961 (1952)	from Indianapolis IN
7 X #	Twin Coach 44S	44	1963 (1948)	
763-767	GMC TDH 4509	45	1963 (1949)	from San Diego
768-782	GMC TDH 4509	45	1964 (?)	from San Diego
801-850	GMC TDH 4517	45	1959-1962	
851-860	GMC TDH 4519	45	1963	
861=870	GMC TDH 4517	45	1964-67	??????
871-890	GMC TDH 4517	45	1965-1967	
3700	Flxible 111CD-05???		1980 (1967)	ex-CTA Lake St. route
3702-3703	Flxible 111CD-05???		1977 (1967)	ex-CTA Lake St. route
8018-8073	GMC TDH 4523A	45	1976	
8361-8370	Grumman 53096B1		1979	
8396-8399	Grumman 53096B1		1979	

== Infrastructure ==
The West Towns offices and main shops were at 259 Lake St. in Oak Park. The Cicero and on Proviso had built a complex on the entire block south of Lake St. between Harvey and Cuyler Aves., with a two-story office building, a shop building, and a car storage building. In 1924, as the West Towns began buying buses, a garage was built and in 1929, a bus storage garage would be built east of Harvey Ave. All bus storage and repair was at Lake St. until WWII. In 1959, Oak Park sold North Bvld., the street behind the car-barn, to the West Towns so they could store buses there. This let the West Towns close the Suburban complex. They continued to use the Lake St. complex until the Pace takeover. In 1986, Pace opened a new garage at 3500 W. Lake St. and the West Town's garage was closed and sold for development.

The West Towns also had a car-barn and storage on the northwest corner of Harlem Ave. and 22nd St. (now Cermak Rd.). It was built by the Suburban Railroad and handled the LaGrange and Lyons streetcars. During WWII, a bus garage was opened there to reduce empty travel mileage to and from southern routes, saving tires wear and fuel (both rationed). After WWII, with the ending of streetcar service, the car-barn was used for bus storage. In 1959, the complex was closed and the property was sold for development.

In 1913, the West Towns generated its own electricity from two power-houses, one at each car-barn complex. After the Lake St. power-house was closed in 1917, the West Towns bought electricity from several sources until 1931, when all power was bought from the Public Service of Northern Illinois (related to Commonwealth Edison).
