= Old Post Office and Courthouse =

Old Post Office and Courthouse may refer to:

- Old Post Office and Courthouse (Auburn, New York), a historic court house and former post office in Auburn, New York
- Old United States Post Office and Courthouse (Miami, Florida), a historic courthouse in Miami, Florida
- Little Rock United States Post Office and Courthouse, a historic post office, federal office and courthouse building in Little Rock, Arkansas
