= Naperville Historic District =

Historic district in Illinois, United States

- U.S. National Register of Historic Places
- U.S. Historic district
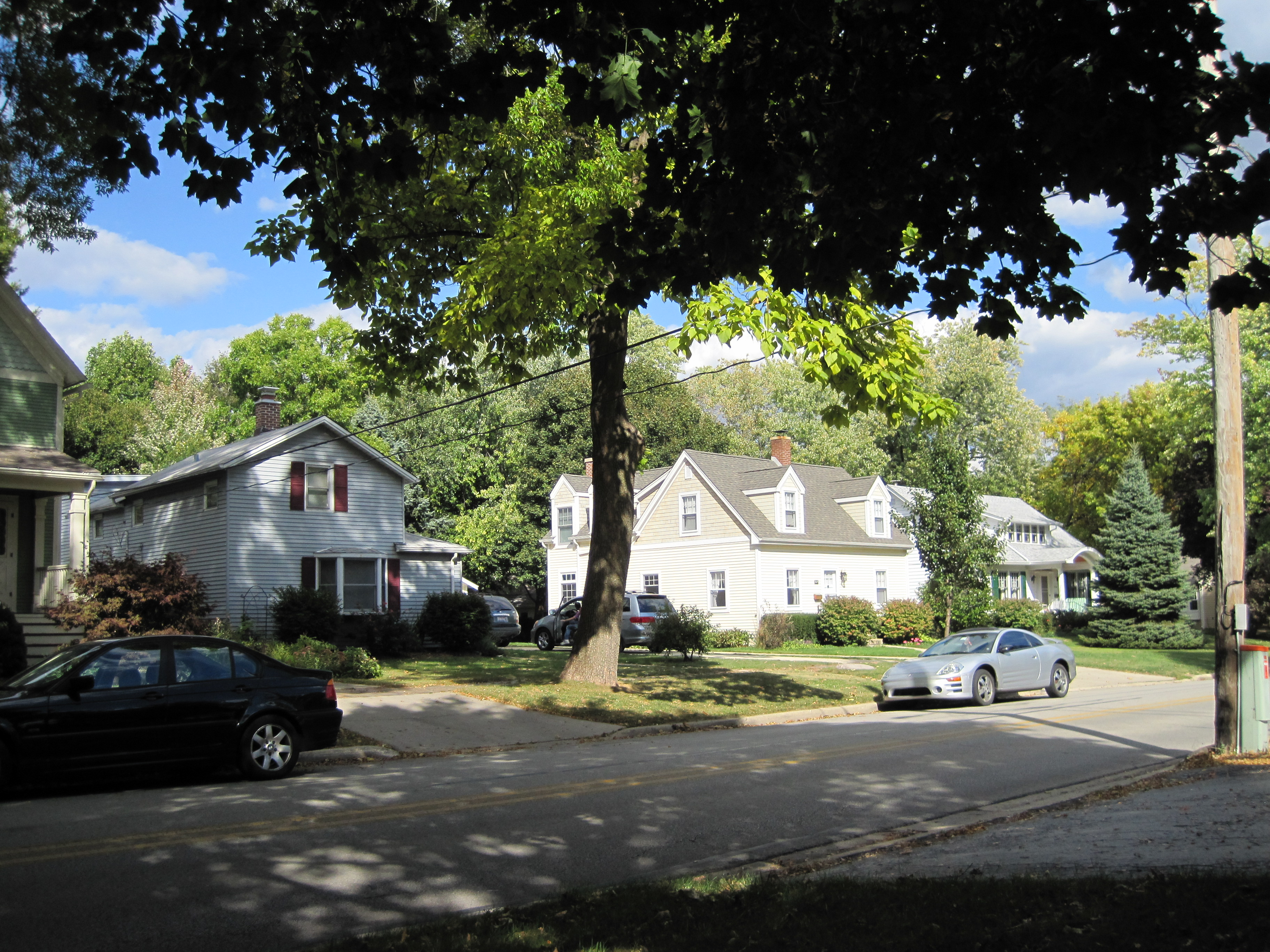
- North Avenue in the Naperville Historic District

- Location within Illinois Location within the United States
- Location: Roughly bounded by Juilian, Highland, Chicago, Jackson, Eagle, and 5th Sts. Naperville, DuPage County, Illinois, U.S.
- Coordinates: 41°46′32″N 88°9′7″W
- Architectural style: Greek Revival, Italianate, Prairie School
- NRHP reference No.: 77001516
- Added to NRHP: September 29, 1977

The Naperville Historic District is a set of 613 buildings in Naperville, Illinois. Of these 613 buildings, 544 contribute to the historical integrity of the area. The district represents the town as it was originally platted and a few early additions.

== History ==
Stephen Scott established a farm on the DuPage River in 1830, marking the first settlement in what would become Naperville. A sawmill, grist mill, trading post, and school were erected soon after several other families migrated to the land. Among the earliest settlers was Joseph Naper, who, in 1831, made a claim to land and built a cabin at the earliest site of Naperville. By 1832, 180 residents lived in the Naperville region. The village was briefly abandoned in 1832 as families fled to Fort Dearborn during the Black Hawk War, but most returned after fighting had ceased. The first post office was constructed in 1833. The Galena Road between Chicago and Galena opened in 1834 and brought commerce to the area. In the 1850s through the early 1870s, Naperville battled politically with Wheaton over which town should be the county seat of DuPage County. Though the town built a courthouse, a court decided in favor of Wheaton. The courthouse was demolished and was converted to a park.

The First Congregational Church of Naperville was founded in 1833, and is the oldest church in DuPage County.

Naperville primarily found economic success through the management of local resources. Stone quarries exported limestone, breweries produced alcohol, and three separate plant nurseries flourished. Other important industries were Naperville Agricultural, producing farming equipment, and Martin Mitchell's Naperville Title and Brick Works. By World War I, the largest employer was Naperville Manufacturing Co., which eventually became of the nation's leading furniture exporters. Plainfield College in Plainfield moved its campus to Naperville in 1870, and was later renamed to North Central College. The Evangelical Theological Seminary was organized in 1873 and was closely associated with North Central until merging with Garrett Theological Seminary in 1974. Despite this economic welfare and religious presence, Naperville grew slowly; the population in 1910 was only 3,449. The town's first major population boom was in the 1950s, as increased ease of traveled enhanced Naperville's place a Chicago suburb. Most of the older sections of town, however, are intact.

The Naperville City Council established the Naperville Historic District in 1986.

In 2019, North Central College announced their plans to purchase and demolish the P. E. Kroehler mansion, owned by Little Friends, for the purpose of rezoning and redeveloping the property with new academic buildings. The college subsequently withdrew from the purchase, but Little Friends stated their intent to proceed with applying to demolish the building.

== Selected sites of structures of significance ==
Naperville selected twenty sites and structures of particular value to exemplify the historical merit of the district.

- Willard Scott, Jr. House (1887) – Son of Stephen Scott. Operated Scott's General Store and the Naperville Hotel.
- Elmholm (built before 1917) – Designed by Harry Robinson. Proprietor Rollo M. Givler owned the Clarion, a local newspaper
- 205 North Wright – Purchased by the seminary in 1908, moved to present site in 1912 for use as a dormitory
- 122 South Brainard (1874) – Owned by Hammerschmidt family, notable for quarrying business
- North Central College (1870) – Designed by John M. Van Osdel. South wing added in 1890
- Nichols House (1917) – Designed by Harry Robinson
- 227 East Jefferson (1866) – Designed by G. N. Gross. Later the home of ecologist May Theilgaard Watts
- Dieter House (1846) – Designed by Dr. David Hess. Moved to present location in 1898.
- Wilson House (c. 1879)
- Kroehler Manufacturing Company (1905) – Alterations in 1909 and 1913
- Paw Paw Station (1833) – First public building in the county (post office). Considerable alterations
- J. L. Nichols House (c. 1890) – Donated funds for public library and North Central College, founder of Kroehler Manufacturing Company.
- General Store (1847–49) – Designed and operated by Joseph Naper, the town's founder
- Central Park (1868) – Former site of county courthouse
- 221 West Jefferson (c. 1870)
- Dr. Truitt House (c. 1917) – Truitt practiced medicine for over 50 years and helped establish the city hospital
- Kreger Family House (c. 1860)
- Nichols Library (1898) – Designed by Mifflin E. Bell
- First Congregational Church (1906)
- P. E. Kroehler House (built before 1917) – Became president of Kroehler Manufacturing Company. Part of North Central College in 1950s
Naperville Historic District Buildings

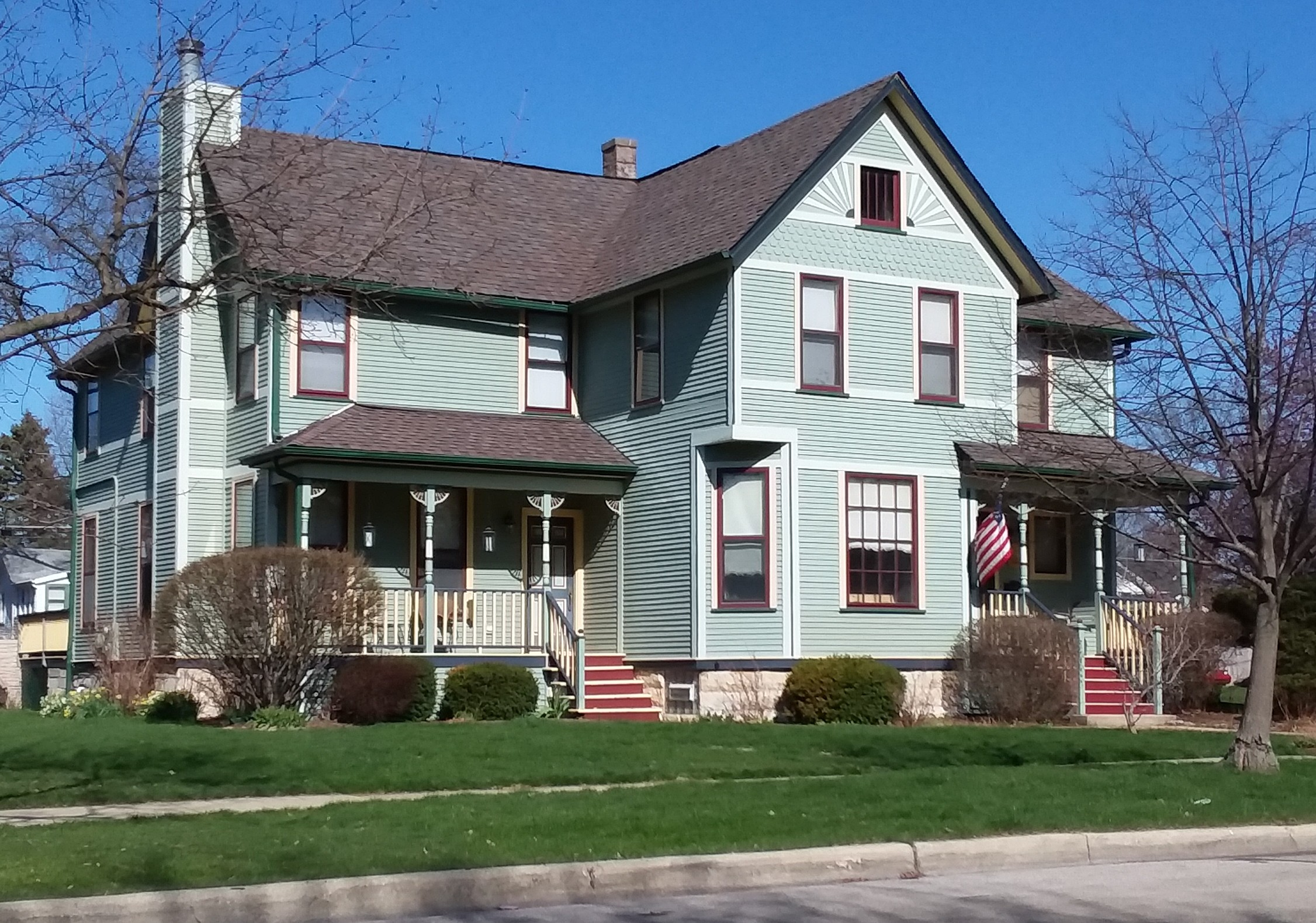
Schwartz Residence (1896)

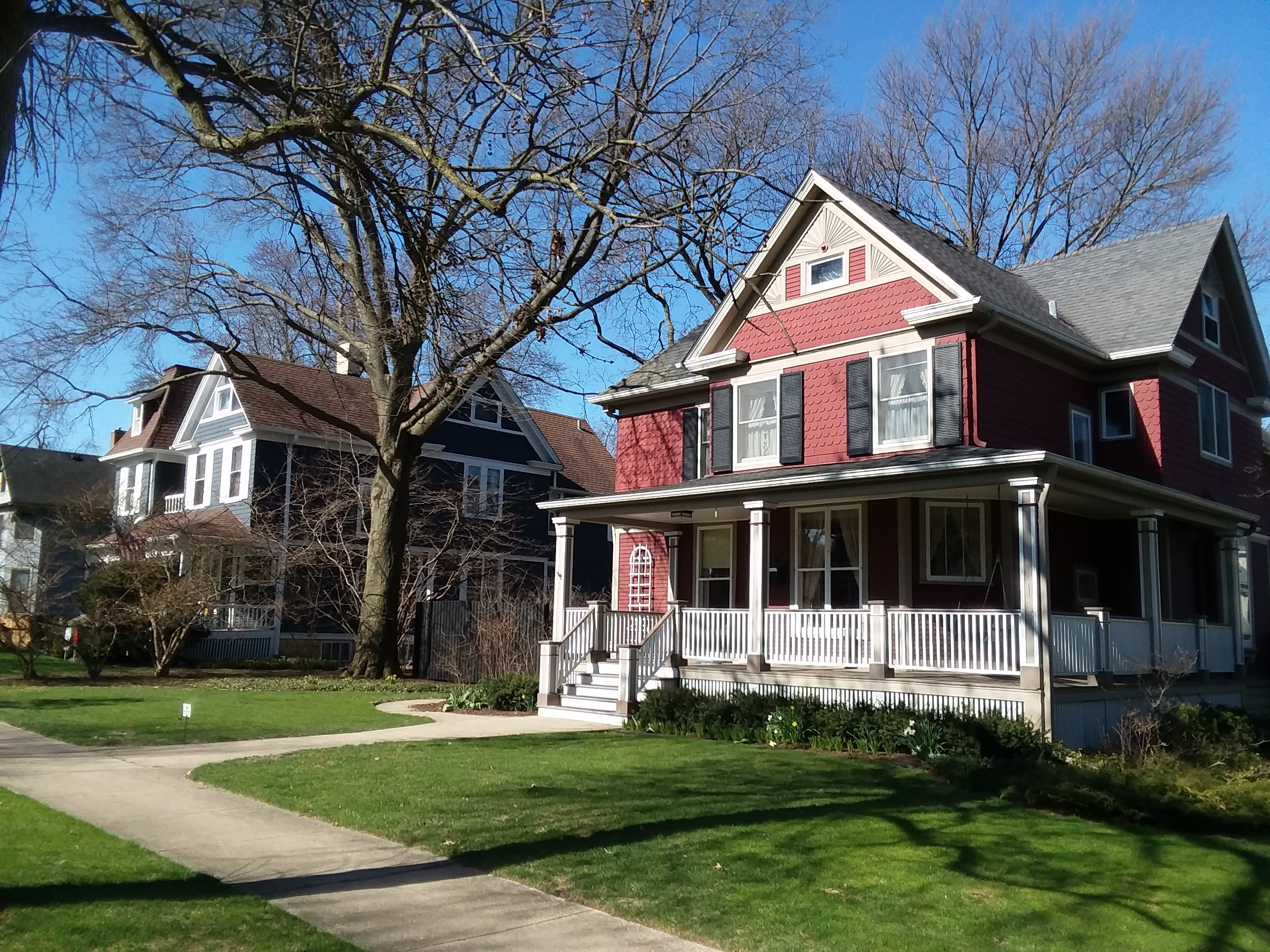
Houses on Sleight Street

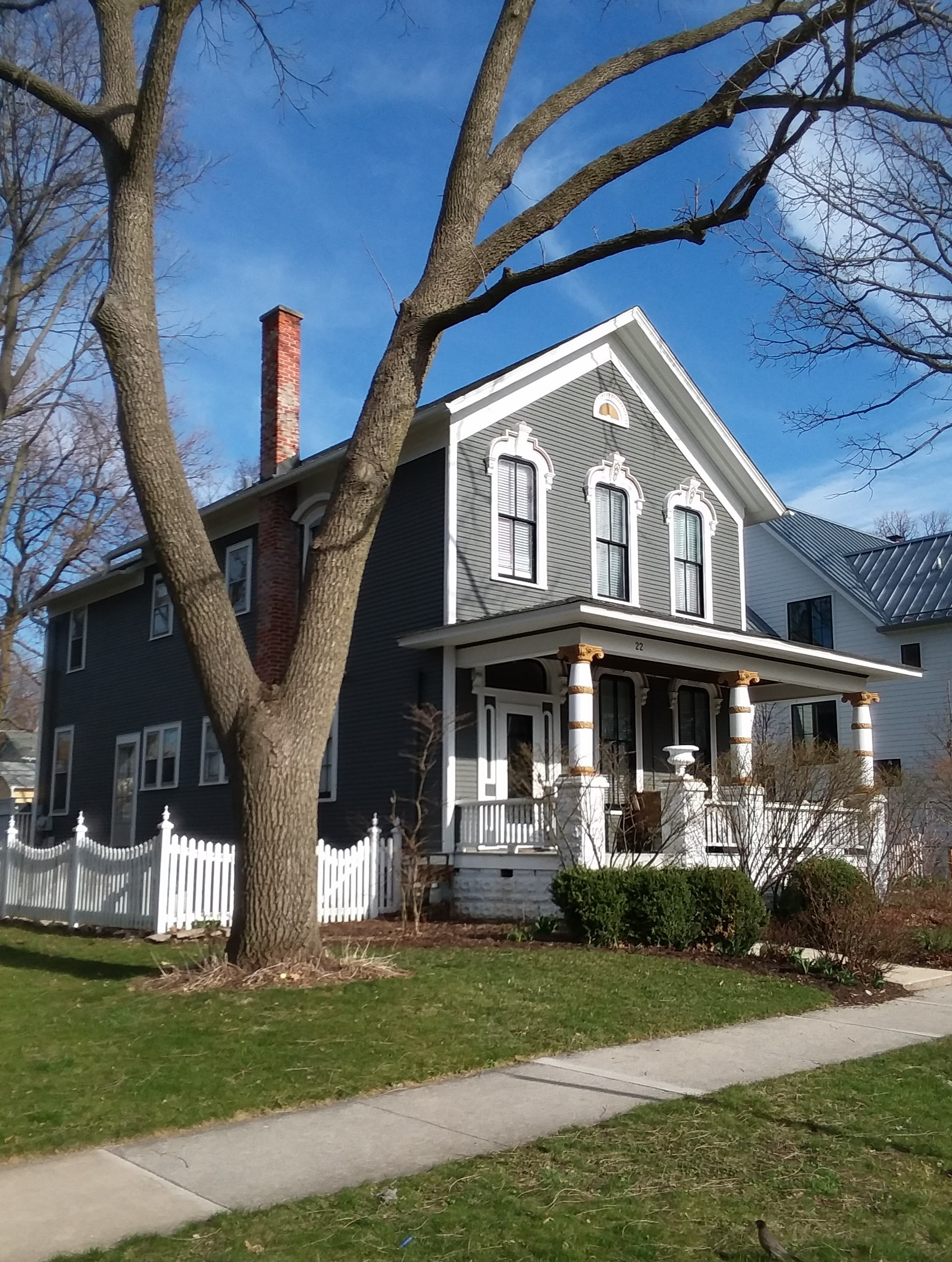
Historic Home on Ellsworth Street

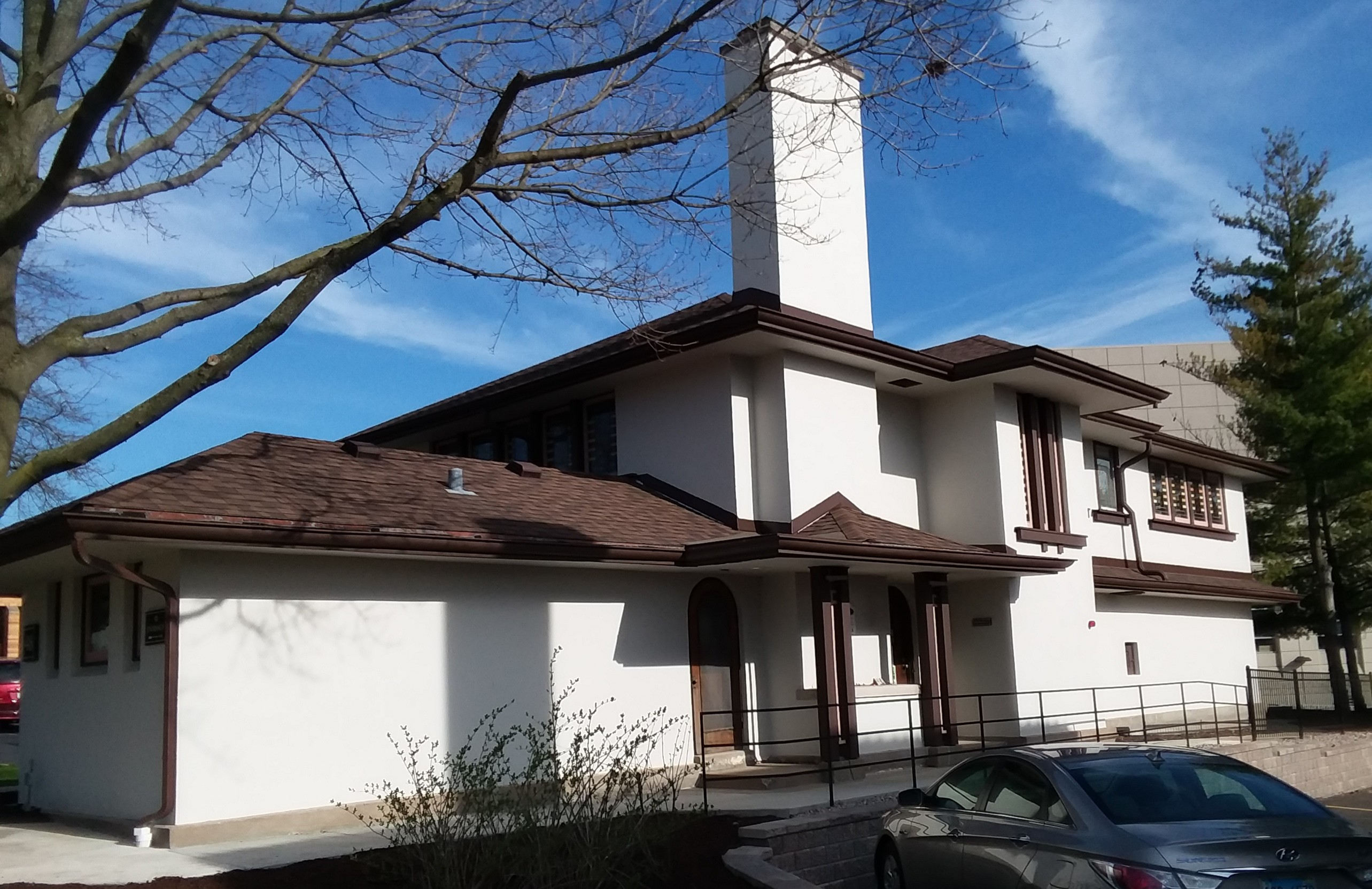
Truitt House (1916)

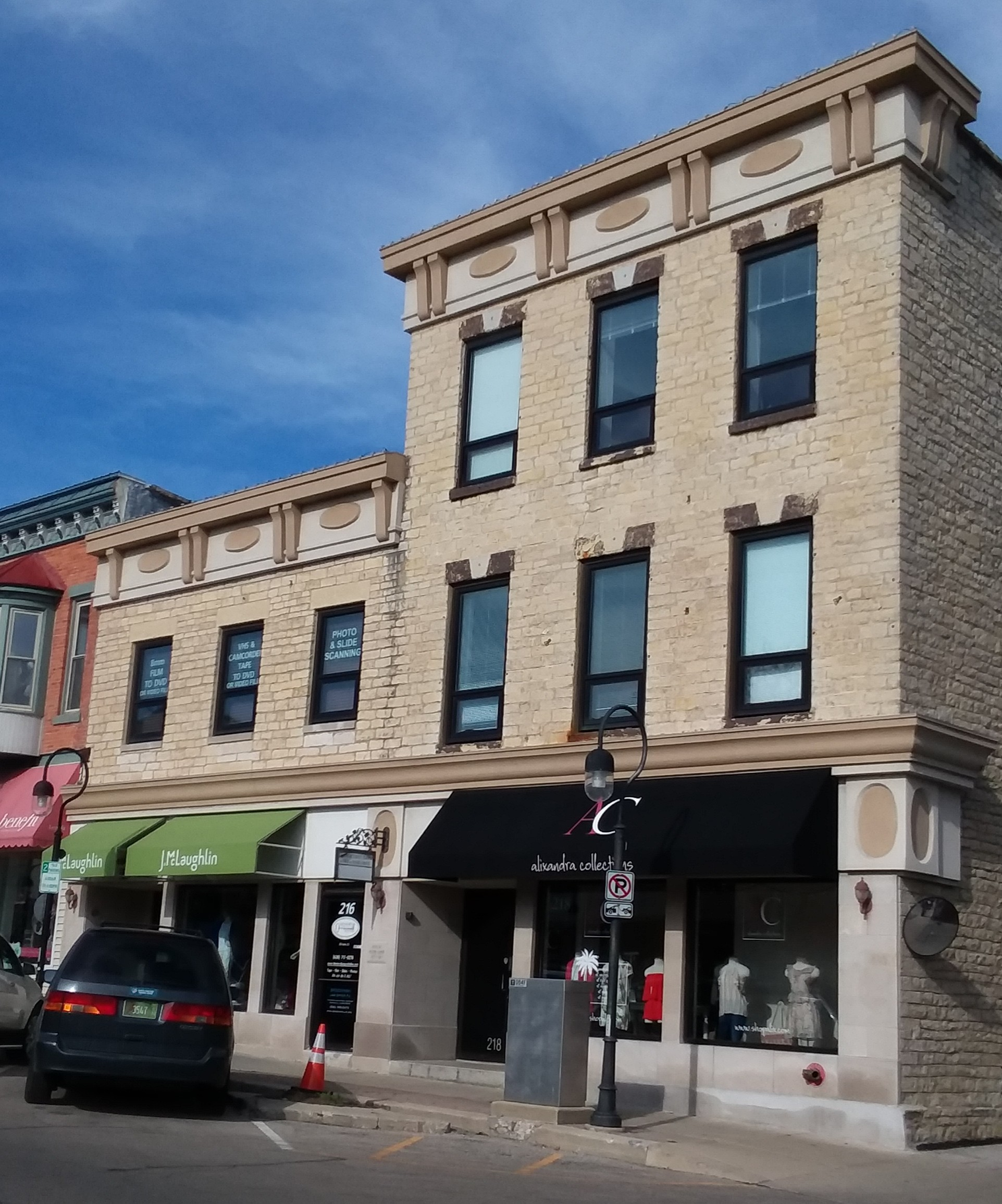
Joe Naper General Store (1847-1849)

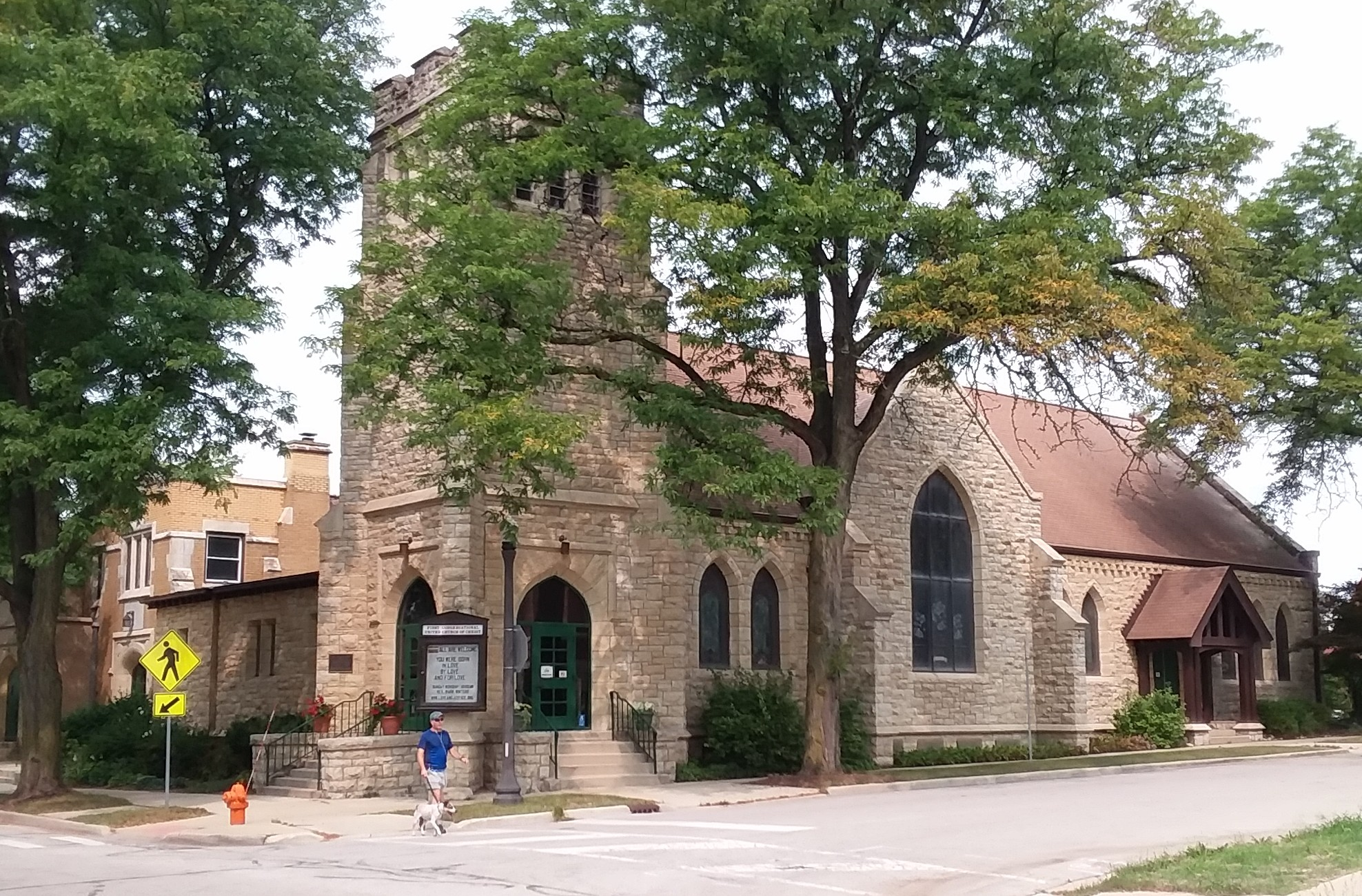
First Congregational Church (1906)

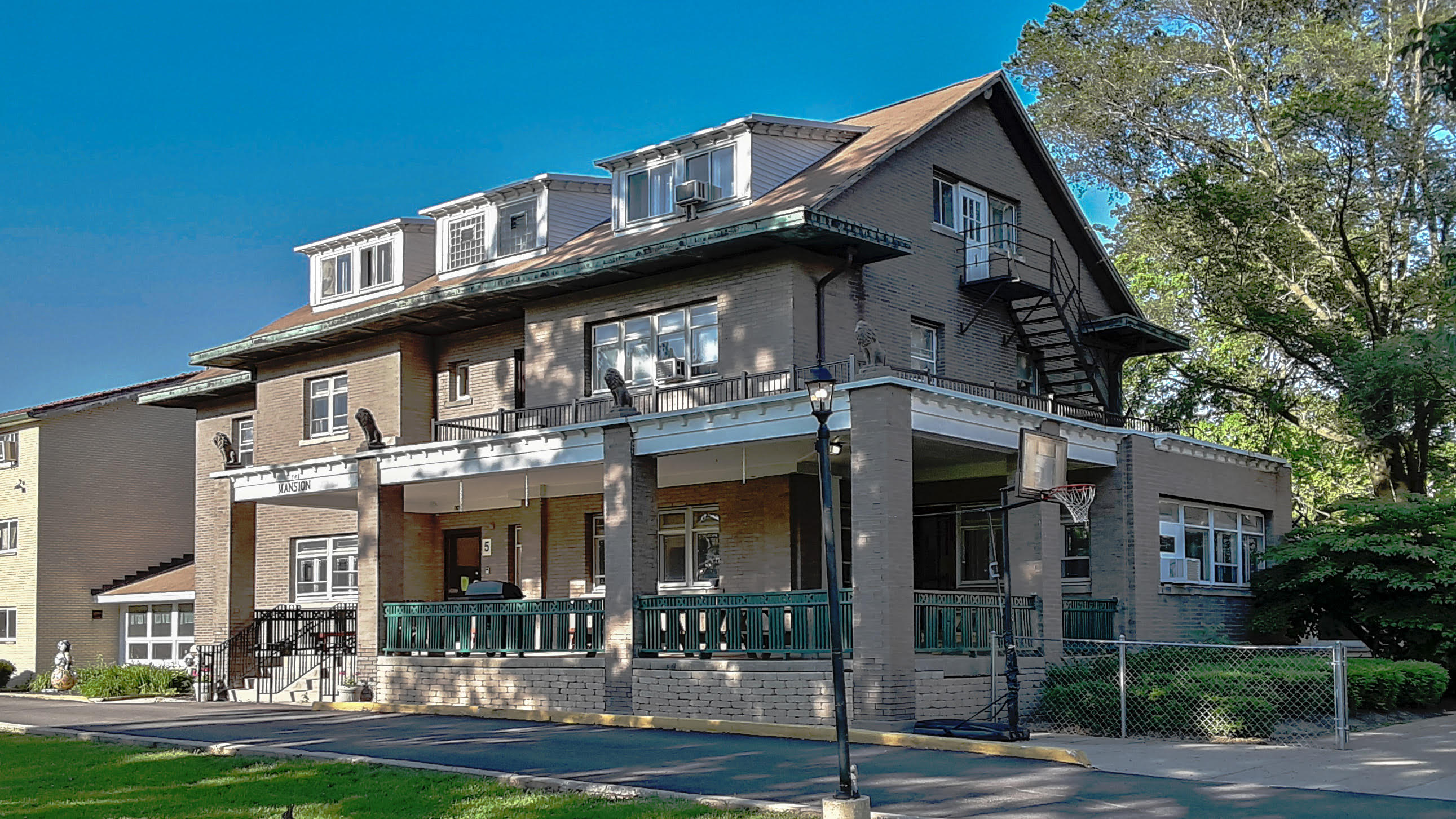
P. E. Kroehler House, 126 N. Wright St.

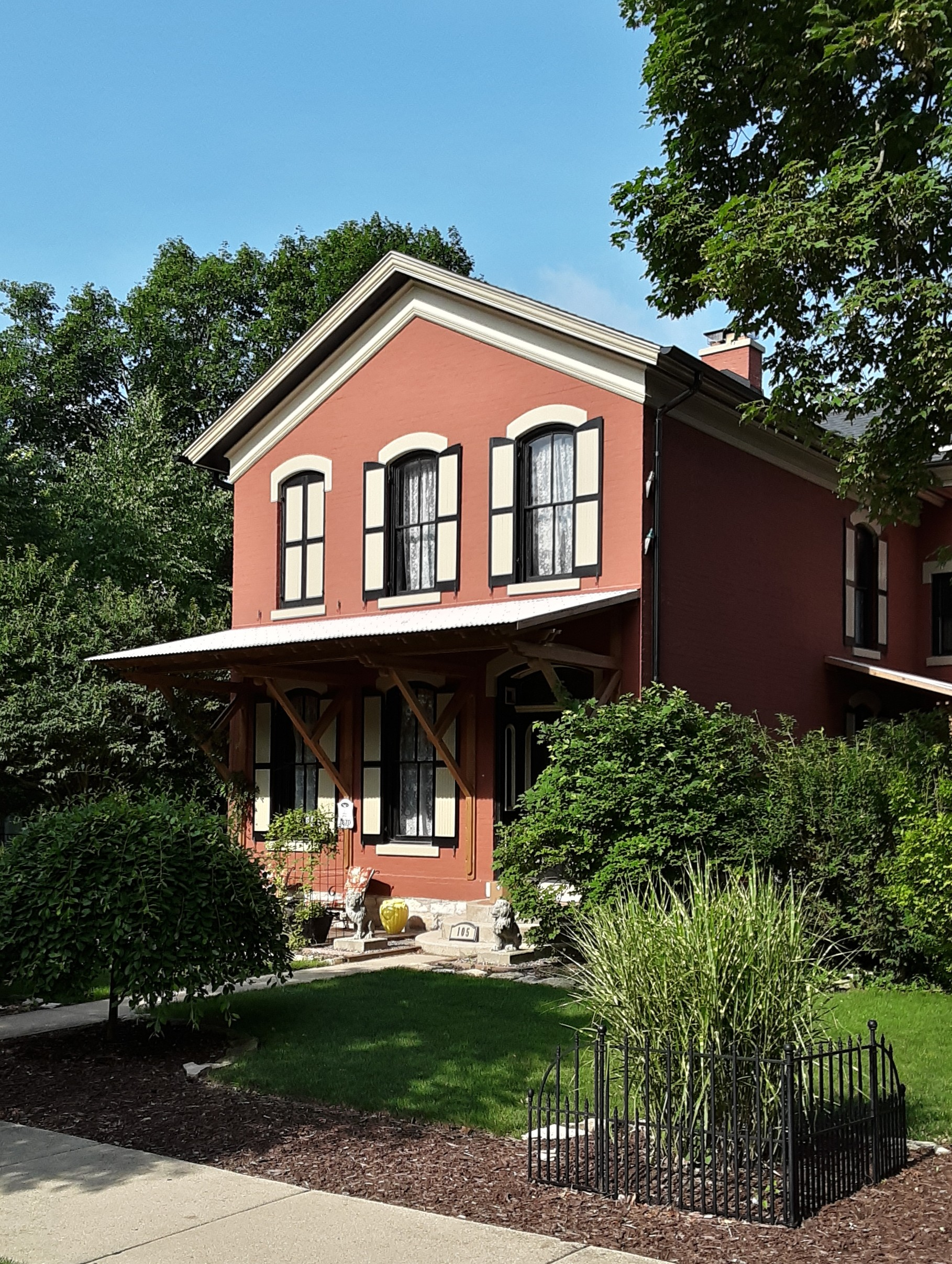
Hillegas/White House, N. Ellsworth St. (1870)
