= Old Nichols Library =

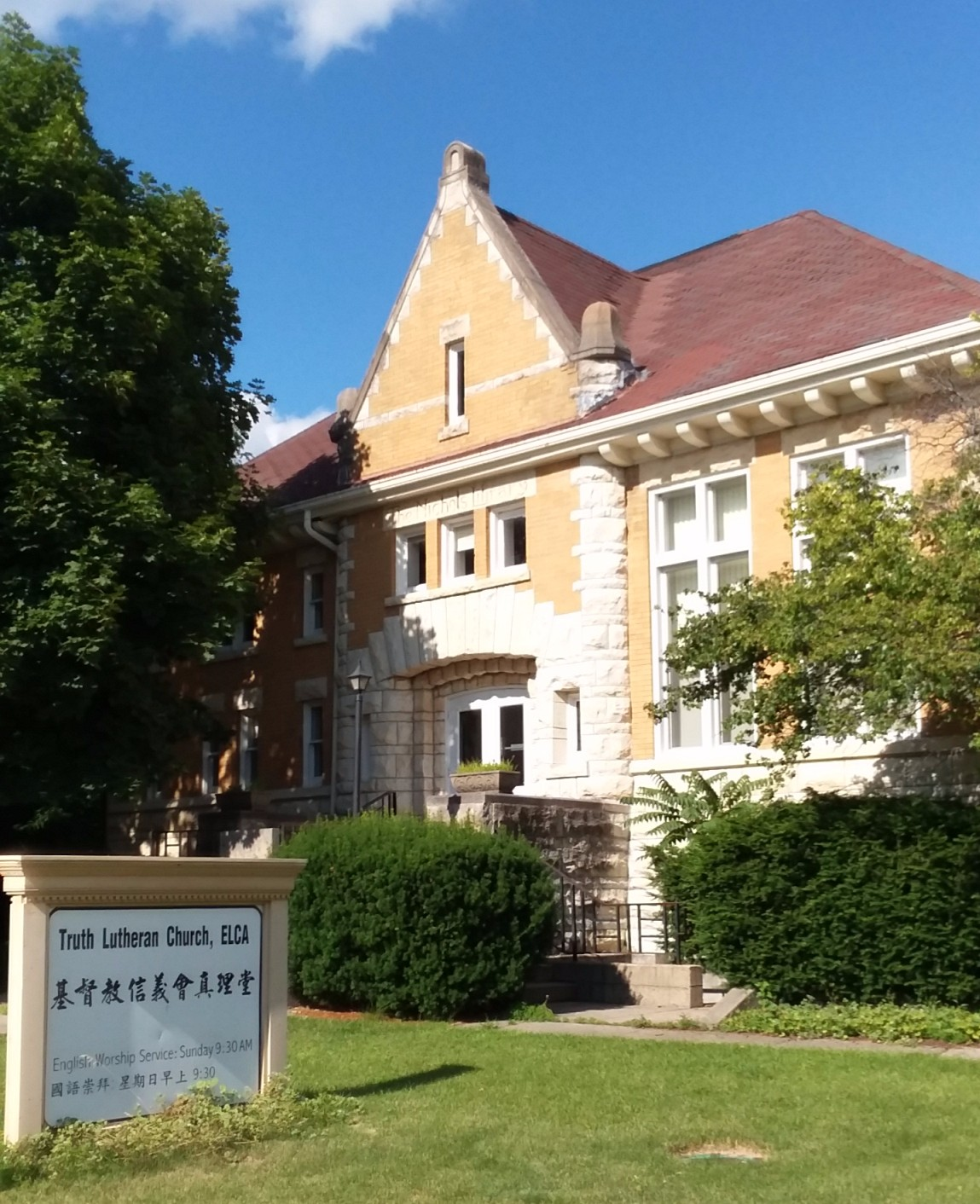
- Photograph of the Old Nichols Library building in Naperville, Illinois

- Location within Illinois Location within the United States
- 41°46′26″N 88°8′51″W
- Location: 110 South Washington Street, Naperville, Illinois

History
- Built: 1897

Site notes
- Architect: Mifflin E. Bell
- Architectural style: Richardsonian Romanesque
- Governing body: Naperville City Landmark

The Old Nichols Library is a historic building on Washington Street in Naperville, Illinois. The building was designed by Mifflin E. Bell in the Richardsonian Romanesque style. The building served as the original public library for Naperville from its construction in 1897 until 1986, when the library operations moved to the new, modern Nichols Library on Jefferson Avenue in Naperville.

The building is constructed with yellow brick and indigenous limestone, of a much lighter design than is typical for the style. The building has a hipped roof with a gable centered in front. The center of the primary facade is stepped forward, with a broad, rough limestone arch that rises over the front door.

James L. Nichols, a professor at North-Western College (now North Central College) and successful author and publisher, established the library with a $10,000 bequest. In 1962, the City of Naperville built an addition, of a modern design, connecting to the south wall of the original building.

In 1996, the City sold the building to a local church. A developer bought the building from the church in 2017.

The Old Nichols Library building is listed on the National Register of Historic Places as a contributing resource to the Naperville Historic District.

In 2017, the City designated the building as a local landmark under Naperville historic preservation ordinances.

In 2022, renovations on the Old Nichols Library building were finished, and it opened as an Italian restaurant.
