= Old Post Office (Augusta, Maine) =

- U.S. National Register of Historic Places
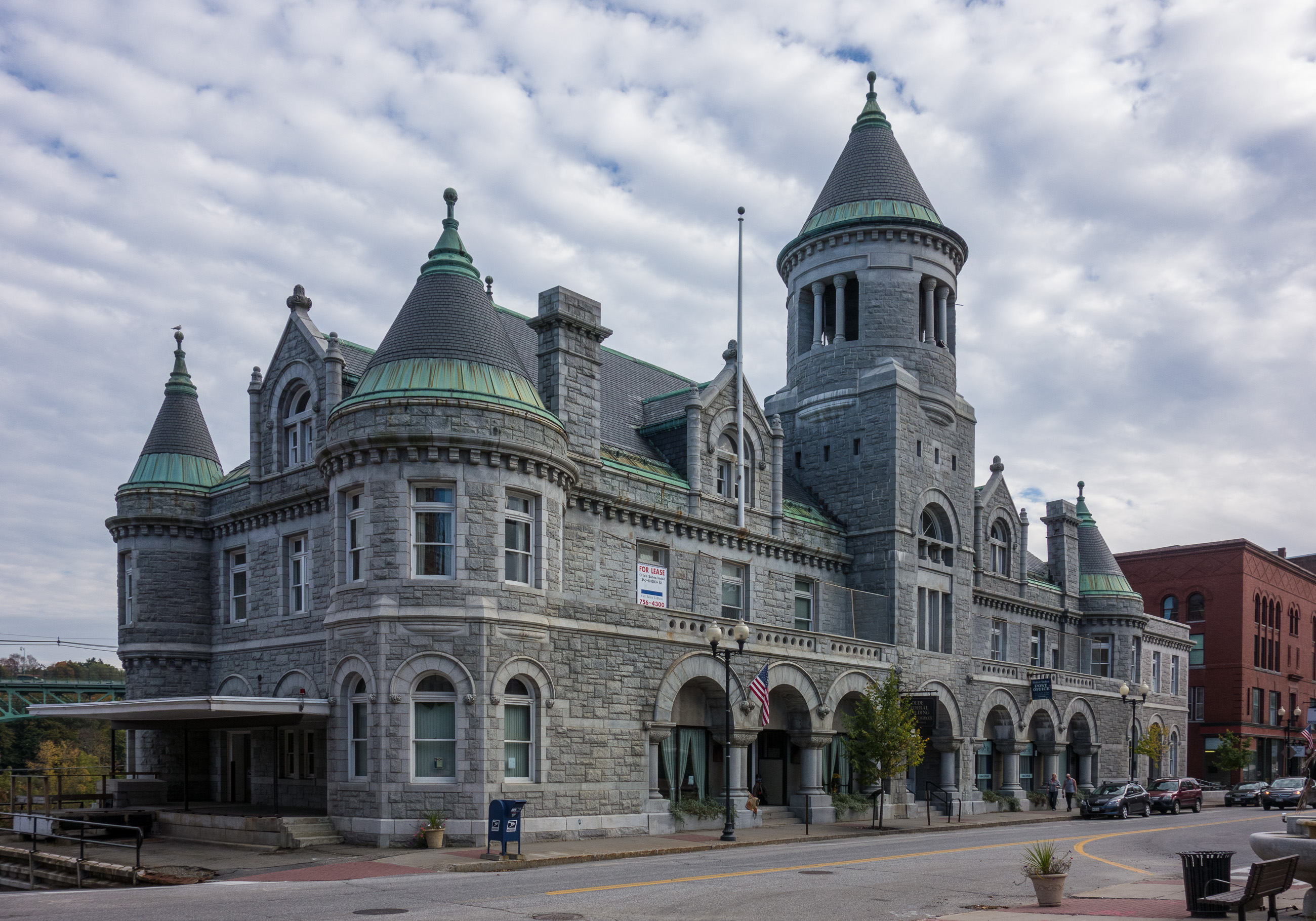
- The Old Post Office in 2013

- Location within Maine Location within the United States
- Location: 295 Water St., Augusta, Maine
- Coordinates: 44°18′51.98″N 69°46′29.6″W
- Built: 1886–1890
- Architect: Mifflin Bell
- Architectural style: Romanesque Revival
- NRHP reference No.: 74000172
- Added to NRHP: July 18, 1974

The Old Post Office and Court House is a historic former federal government building at 295 Water Street in downtown Augusta, Maine. Built in 1886–1890, it is one of Maine's finest surviving examples of Romanesque Revival architecture. It was listed on the National Register of Historic Places in 1974.

== Design and construction ==
The former Post Office and Court House stands on the east side of Water Street, Augusta's principal commercial downtown thoroughfare, at the southeast corner with Winthrop and Front Streets. It is a symmetrical 2-1/2 story granite structure with a central tower, flanked on either side by a wall and smaller tower. It was designed by Mifflin E. Bell (1846–1904), the Supervising Architect for the U.S. Treasury. Bell's term ended July 1887, and his successor William Alfred Freret finished the job, and the building opened in January 1890. The cost of construction was $178,281.20. It contained 427,600 cubic feet, was heated by steam, and contained a hydraulic freight elevator for post office use.

The building was enlarged sometime during the tenure of treasury architect James Knox Taylor (1897 to mid-1912).

== History ==
The building was used as a courthouse and post office until the 1960s, when a new, larger federal building was constructed for these uses. The Old Post Office was sold as surplus property to a private owner. It was adaptively repurposed to house a bank, restaurant, and office, while largely preserving the exterior.

== See also ==
- National Register of Historic Places listings in Kennebec County, Maine
