= Monroe County Courthouse (Wisconsin) =

- U.S. National Register of Historic Places
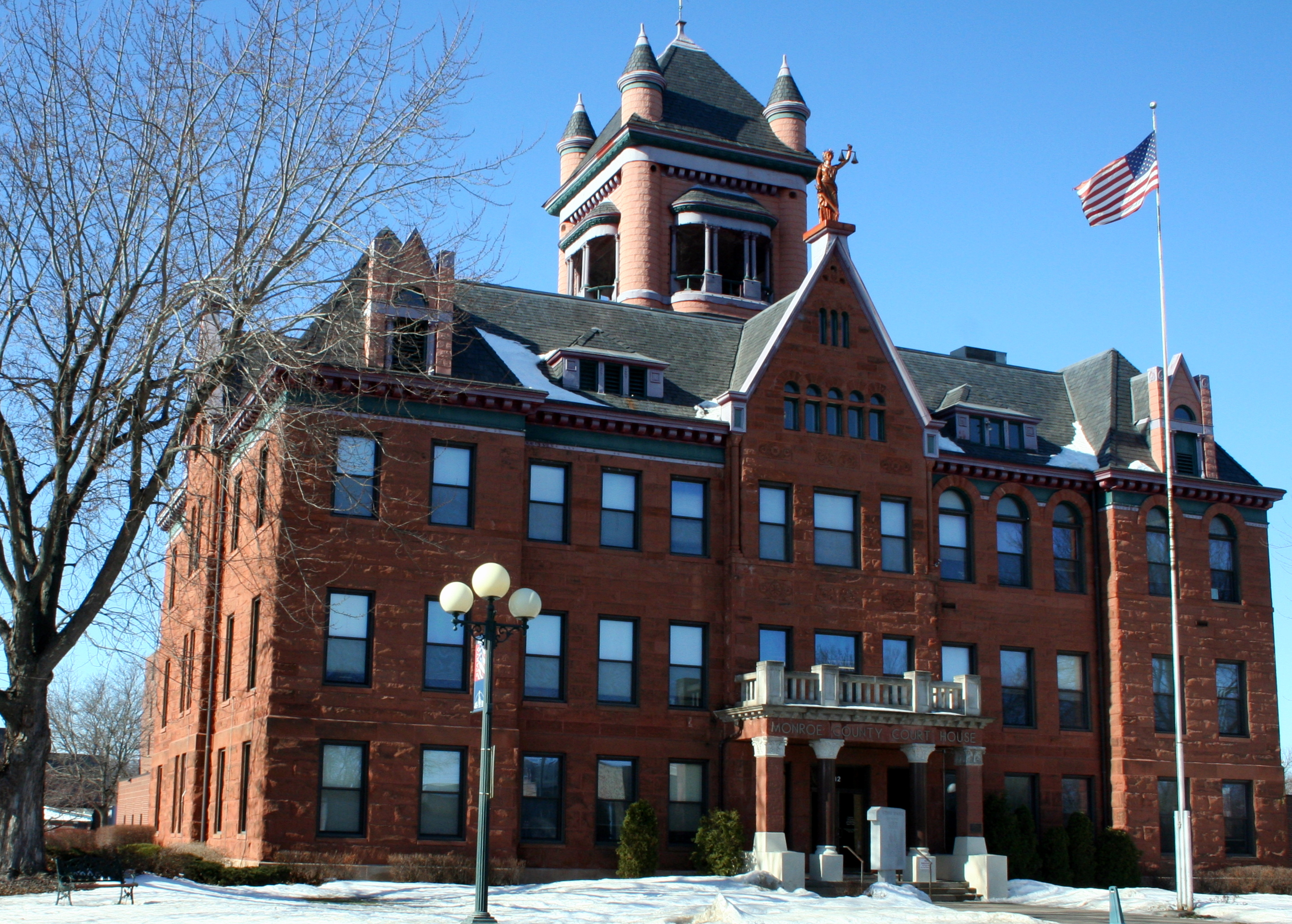

- Location within Wisconsin
- Interactive map showing the location of Monroe County Courthouse
- Location: 418 W. Main St., Sparta, Wisconsin
- Coordinates: 43°56′37″N 90°48′44″W
- Area: 1.5 acres (0.61 ha)
- Built: 1895
- Architect: Mifflin E. Bell
- Architectural style: Romanesque, Richardsonian Romanesque
- MPS: County Courthouses of Wisconsin TR
- NRHP reference No.: 82000689
- Added to NRHP: March 9, 1982

The Monroe County Courthouse in Sparta, Wisconsin is a historic courthouse built in 1895, designed by architect Mifflin E. Bell. It was listed on the National Register of Historic Places in 1982.

It is Richardsonian Romanesque in style.

It is a three-story red sandstone building with a hipped roof attic.
