= United States Post Office – Port Townsend Main =

- U.S. Post Office – Port Townsend Main
- U.S. National Register of Historic Places
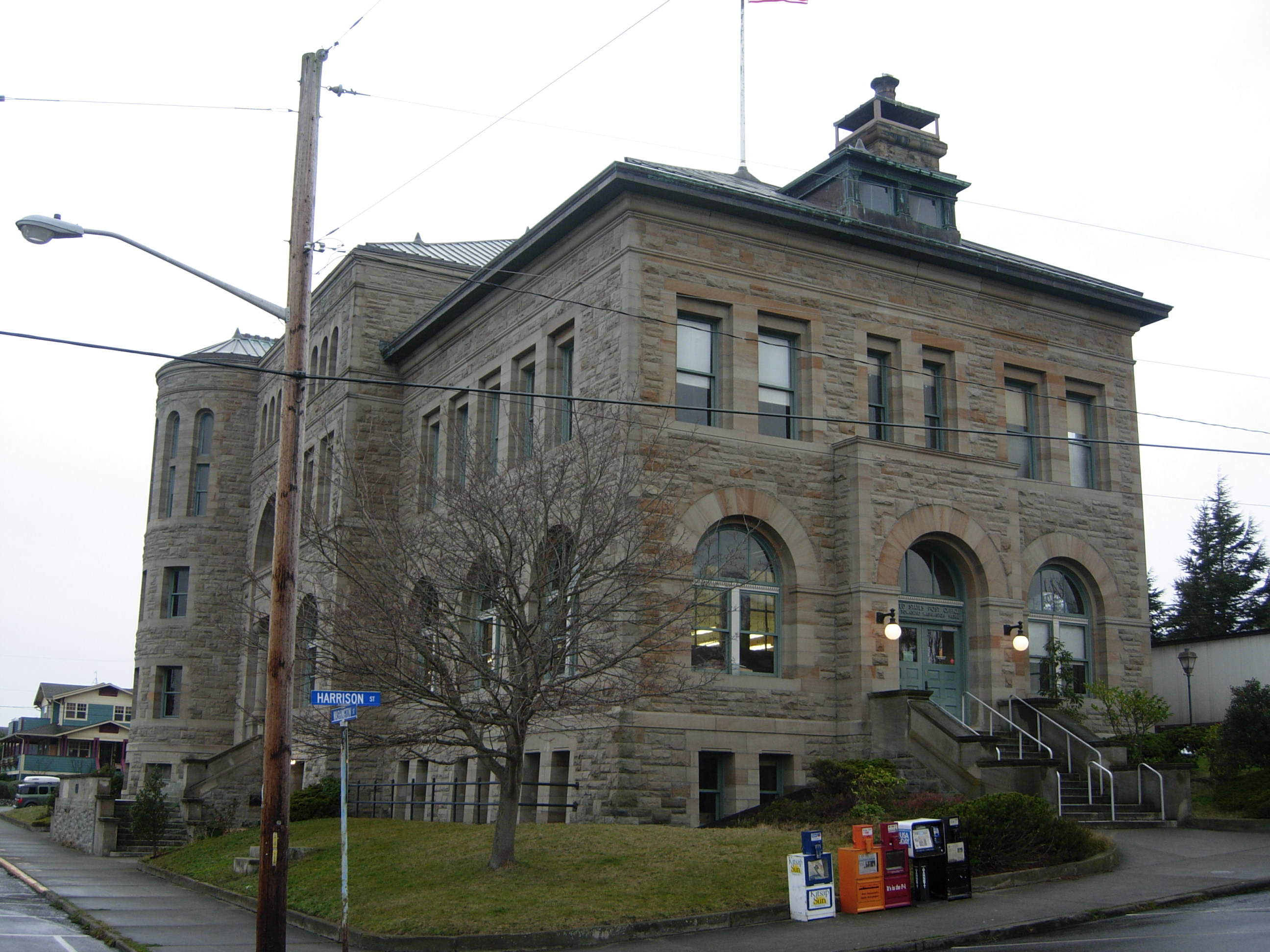

- Location within Washington (state)
- Location: 1322 Washington, Port Townsend, Washington
- Coordinates: 48.11340°N 122.76193°W
- Area: 1.1 acres (0.45 ha)
- Built: 1889-93
- Architect: Bell, M.E.; Edbrooke, W.J.
- Architectural style: Romanesque, Richardsonian Romanesque
- MPS: Historic US Post Offices in Washington MPS
- NRHP reference No.: 91000652
- Added to NRHP: May 30, 1991

United States Post Office – Port Townsend Main is a Richardsonian Romanesque building completed in 1893 on a bluff above Port Townsend's waterfront. It was intended to serve as a Federal building that would include a customhouse serving Port Townsend's incipient role in world trade. It was locally reported to be a very fine building for the Northwest, and even in fact that "'for that matter, size considered there is nothing better in the United States.'" But by its completion there was deeper disappointment in Port Townsend about the city not becoming the trade center that it had hoped to become.

Architects Mifflin E. Bell and Willoughby J. Edbrooke had designing and/or supervising roles. It was listed on the U.S. National Register of Historic Places in 1991.

U.S. Congress appropriated $9,000 to purchase its land in March 1885. Construction of its basement began in 1889. It was completed in February 1893. This period spanned the time during which Port Townsend hoped to beat out Tacoma and Seattle to become the major port city on Puget Sound. Construction of this customhouse was part of furthering that goal. However the hopes foundered, with a major setback being the November 1890 failure of the bank financing construction of a railroad from Portland to Port Townsend.
