= Carson City Post Office =

- U.S. National Register of Historic Places
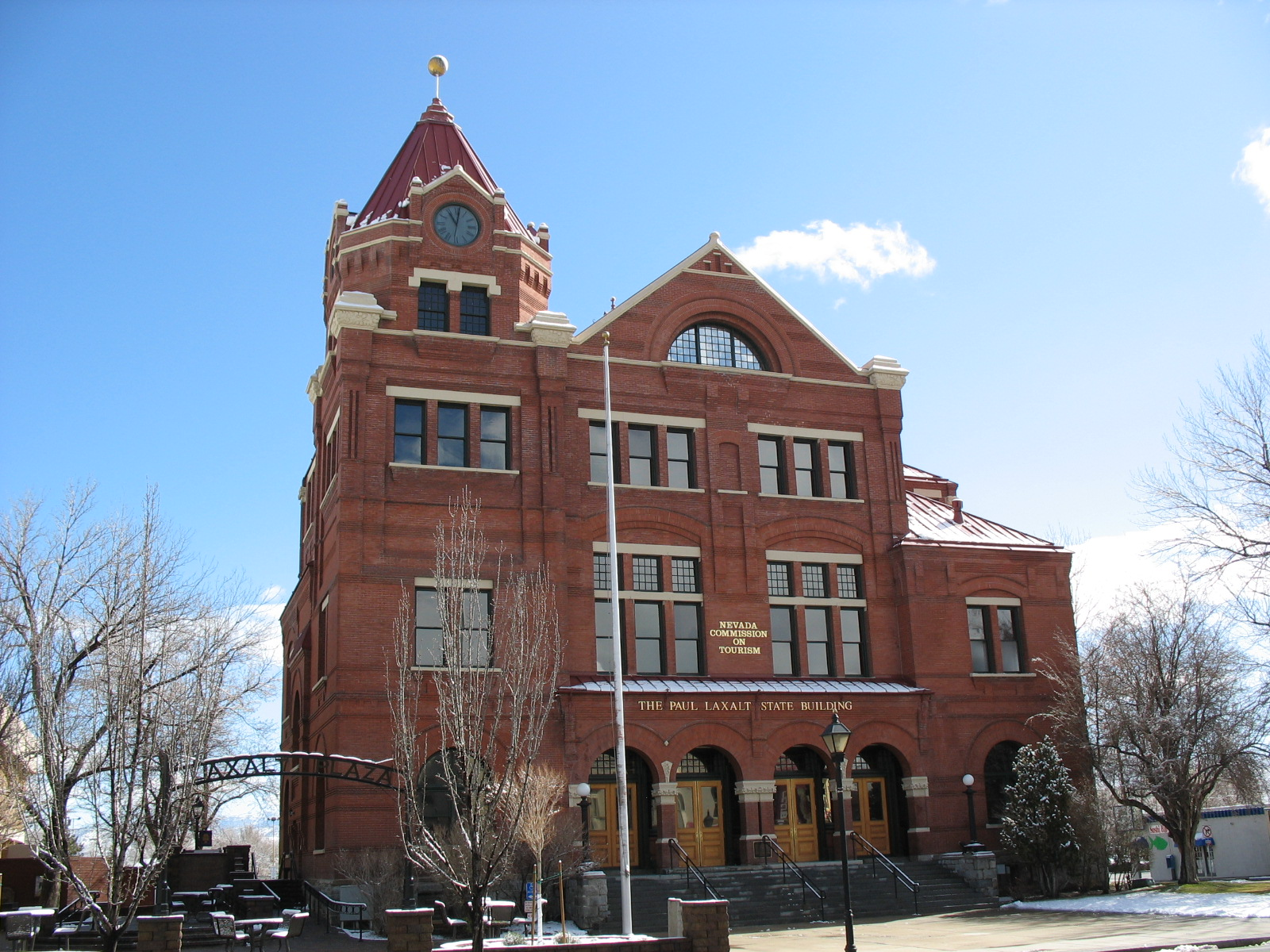

- Location within Nevada Location within the United States
- Location: 401 N. Carson St., Carson City, Nevada
- Coordinates: 39°10′0″N 119°45′57″W
- Area: less than one acre
- Built: 1888
- Architect: M.E. Bell
- Architectural style: Romanesque, Richardsonian Romanesque
- NRHP reference No.: 79003440
- Added to NRHP: February 9, 1979

The Carson City Post Office is a historic building in Carson City, Nevada built from 1888 to 1891. It was designed by architect Mifflin E. Bell. It was listed on the National Register of Historic Places in 1979.

It is significant as the second federal building built in Nevada (the earliest federal building in Nevada is the Carson City Mint), and the only one of its architectural style, which is Richardsonian Romanesque. It served as a courthouse of the United States District Court for the District of Nevada from 1891 to 1965. In 1999 it was renamed the Paul Laxalt State Building for former Nevada Governor Paul Laxalt, and now houses the Nevada Commission on Tourism.

Bell, a Supervising Architect of the Treasury Department, was the initial architect, while work was completed under Supervising Architect successors Will Frost and James Windrum.

== History and Context ==
The United States Senate proceeded with a bill allocating $100,000 to construct a public building in the city of Carson, Nevada on January 5, 1885. The responsible senators for this allocation are William Morris Stewart and James W. Nye. On 278th page of his remembrances, Stewart reports, “prevented the conversion of the Mint into a public building and secured mandatory legislation with an appropriation for the construction of the present Government Building at the capital.” Afterwards, from Carson City, some citizens were nominated as a panel for picking a perfect place for the building. A prolonged search took the panel to a site at the city of Reno which was available at $30,000. After around three years, the work of construction began.

When the building was completed, it housed the United States District Court, Land Office, Weather Bureau and the Carson City Post Office. Altogether, 16 rooms were occupied by different organizations. This building had the earliest and sole clock tower of Carson City. It was roughly 106 feet high from the street level. The washrooms of the building were customized in 1908. Also the first elevator of Carson City was installed in this building in 1935. The 1955 upgrade of the building included the removal of the chimney, the insertion of a brick loading dock at the back and the expansion of the lobby. This building stopped serving as the Post Office in 1971, the Post Office shifted to a new establishment 2 blocks to the north-east. Scarcely any change has been done to the building since 1972. The building looks almost the same as it looked a hundred years ago.
