= Ford Transit Bus =

Transit Bus
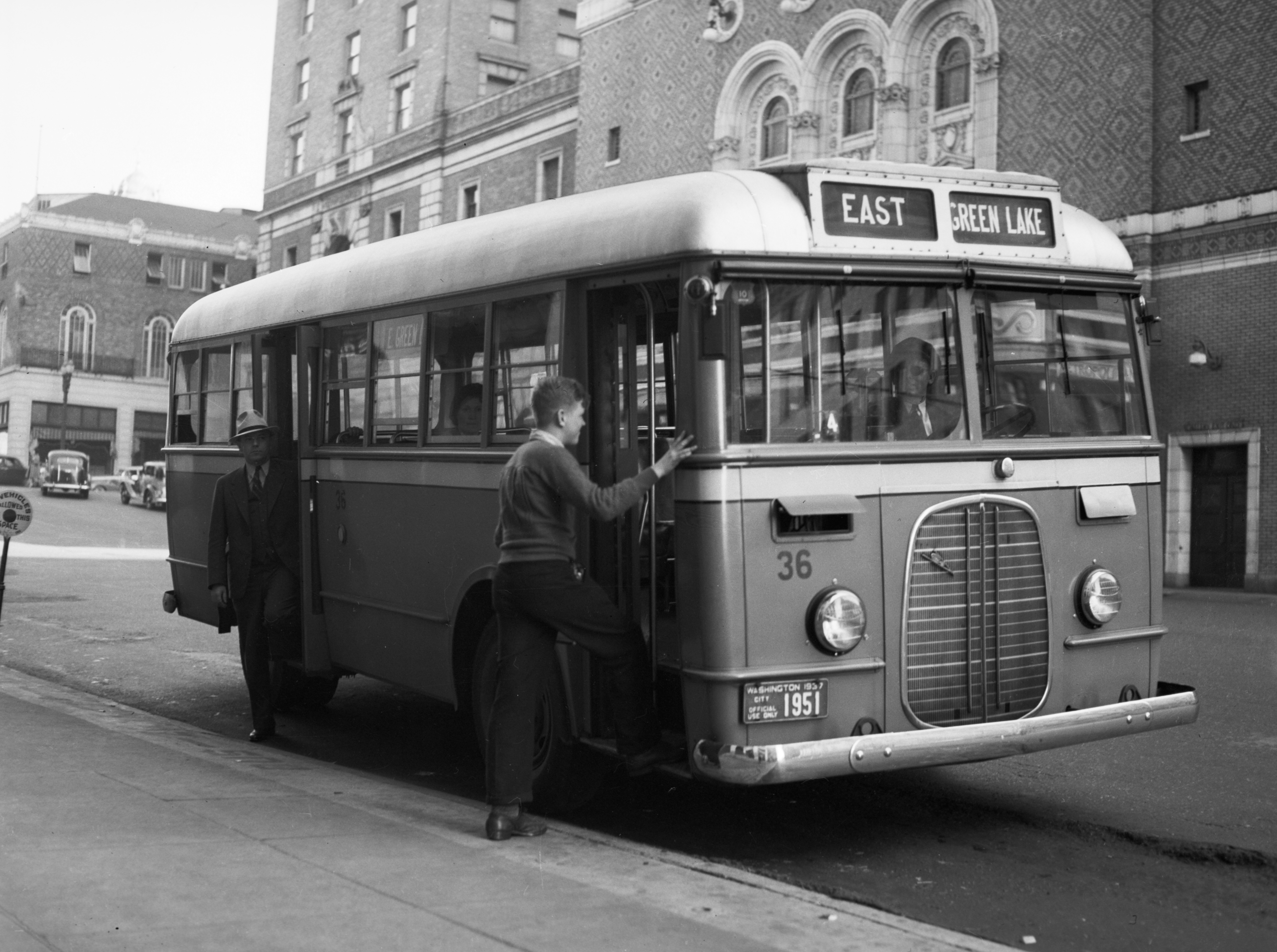
- A 1937 Ford Transit Bus in Seattle when new

Overview
- Manufacturer: Ford
- Also called: Crackerbox
- Production: 1936–1947
- Model years: 1937–1947

Body and chassis
- Class: Transit bus
- Body style: body on chassis
- Layout: front engine (1936–1939) rear engine (1939–1947)

Powertrain
- Engine: Ford 239 cu in (3,920 cc) "flathead" V-8
- Transmission: 3-speed manual

Dimensions
- Wheelbase: 12 ft 4 in (3.76 m)
- Length: 25 ft 9 in (7.85 m)
- Width: 96 in (2.4 m)
- Height: 9 ft 1 in (2.77 m)
- Curb weight: 10,600 lb (4,800 kg)

Chronology
- Successor: Ford 8MB

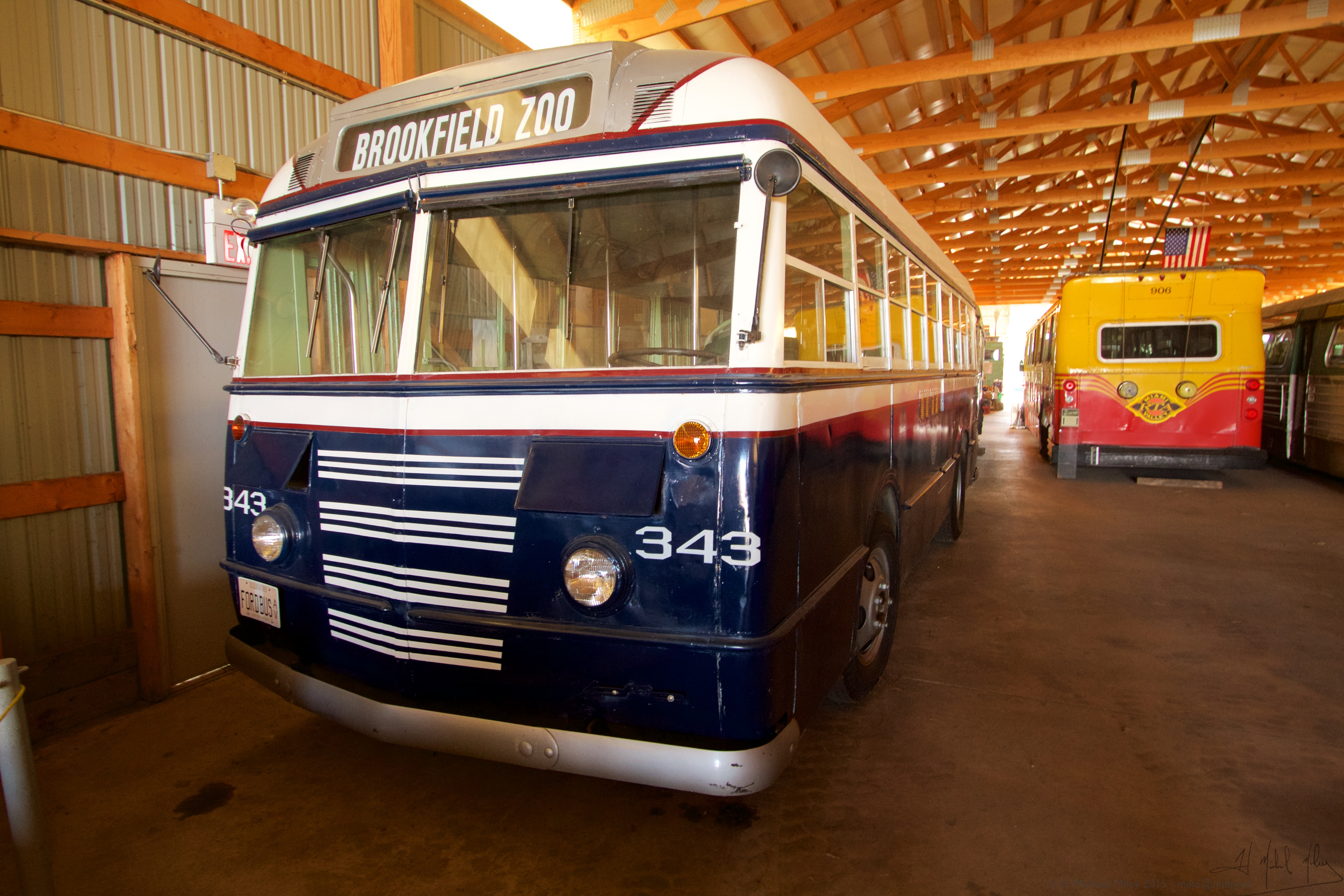
Ex-Montebello Municipal Bus Lines No. 17, a 1944 Ford Transit Bus 49-B, is preserved at the Illinois Railway Museum, repainted (and renumbered) to resemble the Ford buses of a former Chicago-area company.

The Ford Transit Bus was a medium-duty transit bus produced by Ford from 1936 to 1947. The engine was originally placed at the front, but a rear-engine version replaced the original design in 1939. Ford constructed the chassis, which were then fitted with bodies constructed by the Union City Body Company of Union City, Indiana. Canadian versions were built from chassis fabricated in Windsor and bodies produced by Brantford Coach & Body, from 1941 to 1943.

== Front-engine model ==
The first Transit Bus was a prototype that Ford loaned to Detroit Street Railways (DSR), of Detroit, Michigan, in June 1936. After DSR placed an order for 500, Ford began series production, and deliveries began on November 27, 1936 (which Ford considered to be within its "1937" model year). The front-engine or forward-control, design used a 157-inch (400 cm) chassis, Ford model 70, and had a 141-inch (360 cm) wheelbase. An 85 hp, 221-cubic-inch Ford "flathead" V-8 engine was used. Under a new model-numbering scheme, the 70 chassis was renumbered 81-B in the 1938 model year and 91-B in 1939.

Around 1,000 of the original Transit Bus model were built under the standard production arrangement, with bodies built by Union City. However, some customers preferred to use bodies built by other companies, and it is estimated that around 200 buses were built under this arrangement. Strictly speaking, these were not "Transit Buses", but used the same Ford chassis – model 70, 81-B or 91-B, depending on model year – that Ford was using for its Transit Bus model. Of the approximately 1,000–1,200 front-engine Transit Buses built, DSR alone was the purchaser of 750.

== Rear-engine model ==
In early 1939, Ford redesigned the Transit Bus as a rear-engine model, to improve performance through better weight distribution. At the same time, the redesign used a new, larger V-8 engine: a 95 hp, 239-cubic-inch model. A prototype bus was built in February 1939, and series production began in October 1939 (in the 1940 model year). The rear-engine model had a slightly longer wheelbase, 148.5 inches (377 cm). The standard, two-door version had 27 passenger seats. The bodies continued to be supplied by the Union City Body Company. Other manufacturers were no longer building bodies for Ford Transit Buses by this time, only Union City.

Approximately 12,500 rear-engine Ford Transits were built during their eight-year production run, from 1939 to 1947. Along with Detroit, major customers were the Capital Transit Company of Washington D.C.; the Philadelphia Transportation Company; Chicago Surface Lines; San Antonio, Texas; the Milwaukee Electric Railway and Light Company; the Dallas Railway & Terminal Company, Dallas, Texas; the Toronto Transportation Commission and Boston Elevated Railway. The Public Service Interstate Transportation Company of New Jersey had the largest fleet, with a total of 586 new and seven secondhand units.

After World War II, the Transit Bus was rebranded as the Universal Bus in Ford's marketing, but remained commonly known as the Transit Bus. Postwar demand was high, and 4,800 buses were sold during 1946 and 1947. However, production ended in September 1947. Changes in Ford's production and distribution arrangements fostered the designing of a replacement model, designated the 8MB, the prototype chassis for which was also built in September 1947.

== See also ==
- List of buses
