= Mifflin E. Bell =

American architect

Mifflin Emlen Bell
- Born: October 20, 1847; East Bradford Township, Chester County, Pennsylvania
- Died: May 31, 1904 (aged 56); Chicago, Illinois
- Occupation: Architect
- Buildings: Several US Post Offices, Courthouses, and Customhouses

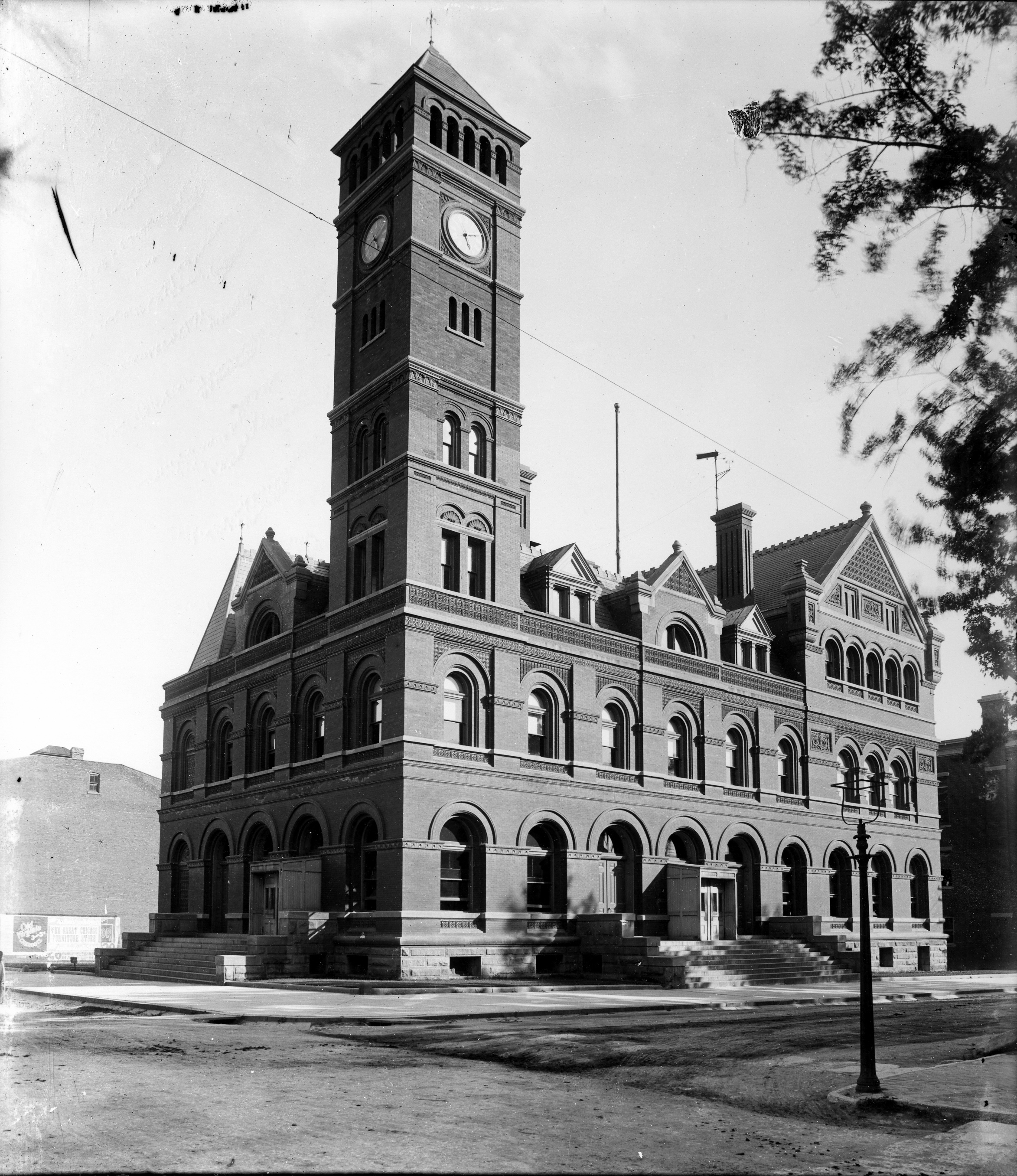
U.S. Post Office and Courthouse (Keokuk, Iowa)

Mifflin Emlen Bell (October 20, 1847 – May 31, 1904), often known as M.E. Bell, was an American architect who served from 1883 to 1886 as Supervising Architect of the US Treasury Department. Bell delegated design responsibilities to staff members, which resulted in a large variety of building styles, including Second Empire, Châteauesque, Queen Anne and Richardsonian Romanesque.

== Life and career ==
Bell was born on a farm in East Bradford Township, Chester County, Pennsylvania to Chalhly Bell & Mary Emlen. He married Addie Vanhoff on June 7, 1871, and by 1876 he was living in Springfield, Illinois with his wife and two children, working as Assistant Superintendent of the statehouse. Bell's tenure as Supervising Architect for the US Treasury began on November 1, 1883, with an annual salary of $4,500 (equivalent to $155,491 today). He was member of the Joint Commission to Complete the Washington Monument, and his name is engraved on the north face of the monument's capstone. Bell submitted his resignation from the position by mid-1887 and moved to Chicago. In Chicago, Bell was appointed as superintendent of repairs for the city's federal buildings, and was in charge of federal buildings at the 1893 World's Columbian Exposition. He died in Chicago of pneumonia in 1904.

Many of his works survive and a number of these are listed on the U.S. National Register of Historic Places (NRHP).

== Works ==
- 1884 — U.S. Custom House and Post Office, Albany, New York
- 1885 — U.S. Custom House, Court House, and Post Office, Memphis, Tennessee
- 1885-89 Federal Building, N. Fitzhugh and Church Sts. Rochester, New York. Architects Harvey and Charles Ellis are credited with the design; M.E. Bell was supervising architect during its 1885-9 construction. NRHP-listed.
- 1886-87 — U.S. Post Office, Lexington Kentucky
- 1887 — U.S. Post Office and Court House, Quincy, Illinois
- 1887 — U.S. Court House and Post Office, Frankfort, Kentucky
- 1887 — U.S. Court House and Post Office, Greensboro, North Carolina
- 1888 — U.S. Post Office, Hannibal, Missouri
- 1888 — U.S. Custom House and Post Office, Toledo, Ohio
- 1888 — U.S. Court House and Post Office, Council Bluffs, Iowa
- 1888 — U.S. Court House and Post Office, Dallas, Texas
- 1888 — United States Post Office and Court House, Aberdeen, Mississippi
- 1889 — U.S. Post Office and Court House, Peoria, Illinois
- 1889 — U.S. Post Office, Minneapolis, Minnesota
- 1889 — U.S. Court House and Post Office, Jefferson City, Missouri
- 1889 — U.S. Court House and Post Office, Tyler, Texas
- 1889 — U.S. Court House and Post Office, Syracuse, New York
- 1889 — U.S. Court House and Post Office, Macon, Georgia
- 1890 — U.S. Court House and Post Office, Augusta, Maine, NRHP-listed
- 1890 — U.S. Court House and Post Office, Keokuk, Iowa, NRHP-listed
- 1890 — U.S. Post Office and Court House, Auburn, New York
- 1890 — U.S. Court House and Post Office, Fort Scott, Kansas
- 1888-1891 — U.S. Court House and Post Office (Carson City), Carson City, Nevada, , Richardsonian Romanesque, NRHP-listed.
- 1892 — U.S. Court House and Post Office, Denver, Colorado
- 1892 — U.S. Post Office, Brooklyn, New York
- 1893 — U.S. Court House and Post Office, Louisville, Kentucky
- 1895 — Monroe County Courthouse, Sparta, Wisconsin, NRHP-listed
- 1896 — DuPage County Courthouse, Wheaton, Illinois
- 1896 — Marion County Courthouse, Main St. Knoxville, Iowa, NRHP-listed
- Mercer County Courthouse, SE 3rd St. (IL 17) Aledo, Illinois, NRHP-listed
- U.S. Post Office, 202 S. 8th St. Nebraska City, Nebraska, NRHP-listed
- US Customs House and Post Office, 223 Palafox Pl. Pensacola, Florida, NRHP-listed
- U.S. Post Office – Port Townsend Main, 1322 Washington Port Townsend, Washington, NRHP-listed
- U.S. Court House and Post Office, Clarksburg, West Virginia
- U.S. Court House and Post Office, Marquette, Michigan
- U.S. Post Office, Terre Haute, Indiana
- U.S. Court House and Post Office, New Albany, Indiana
- 1897 - Nichols Library, Naperville, Illinois

== Gallery of designs ==
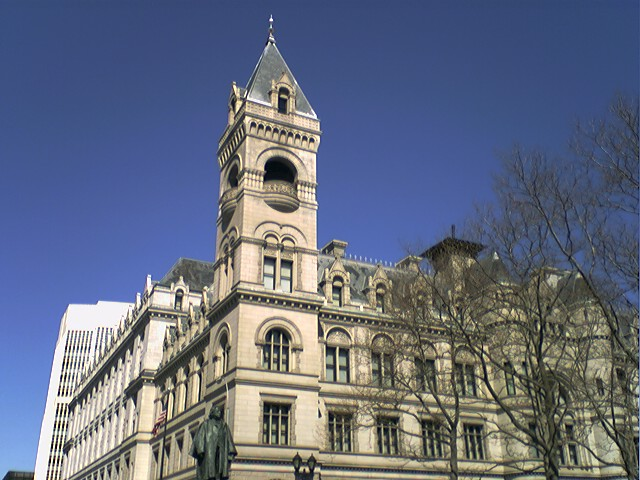
U.S. Post Office, Brooklyn, New York. One of the finest examples of Richardsonian Romanesque

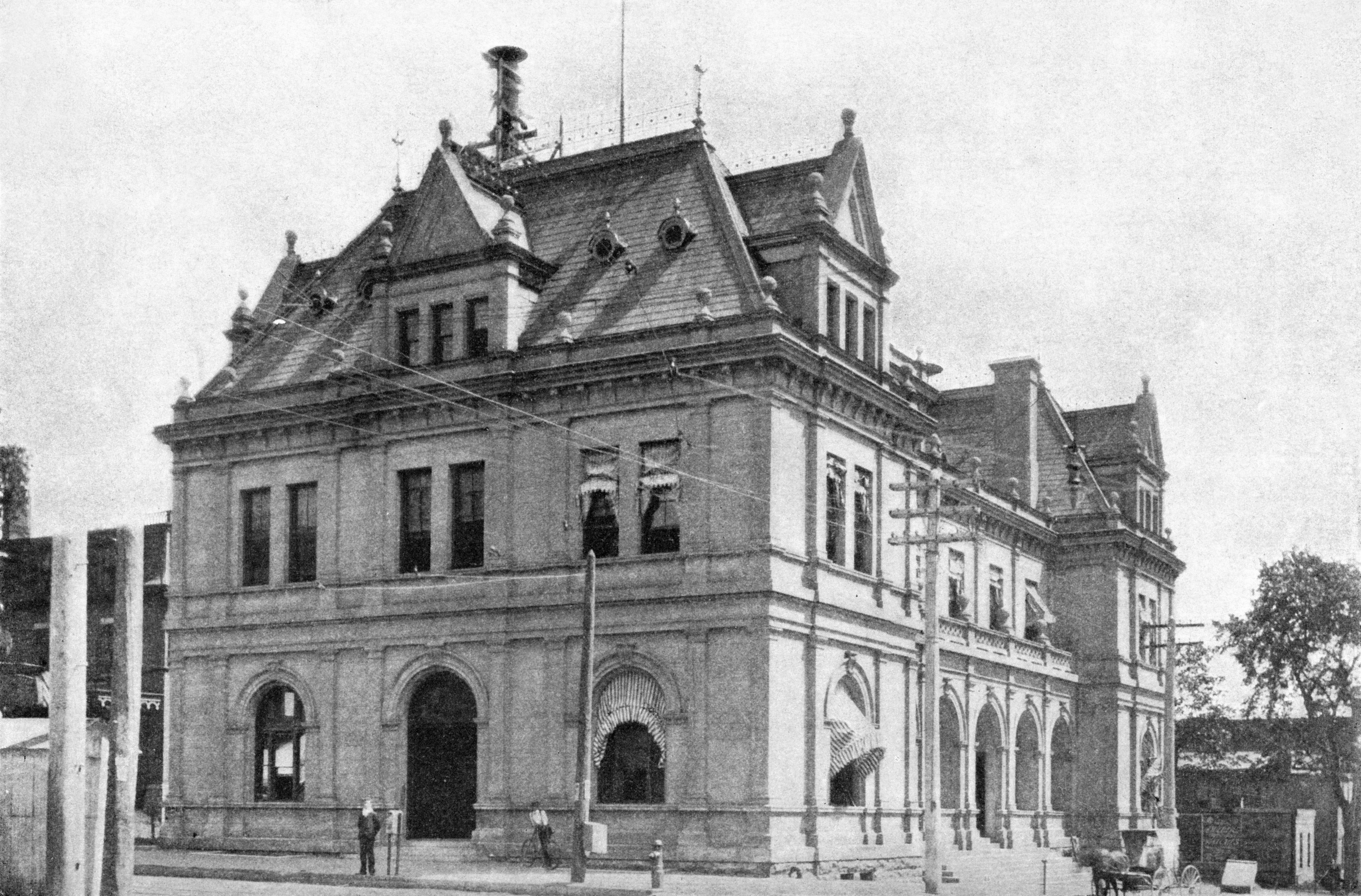
U.S. Post Office, Quincy, Illinois, in the Châteauesque style

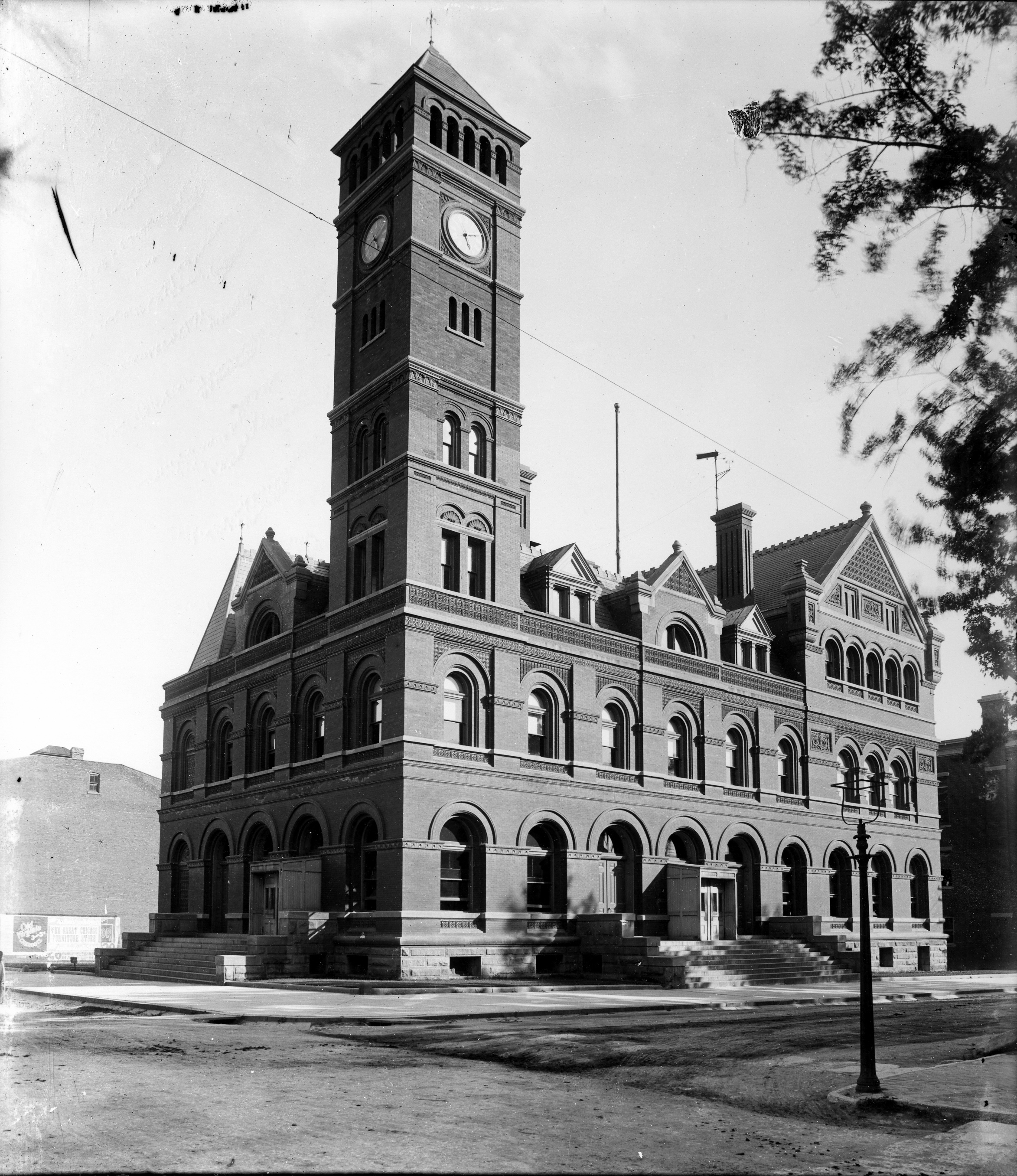
U.S. Court House and Post Office, Keokuk, Iowa, now the Lee County Courthouse, in the Queen Anne style

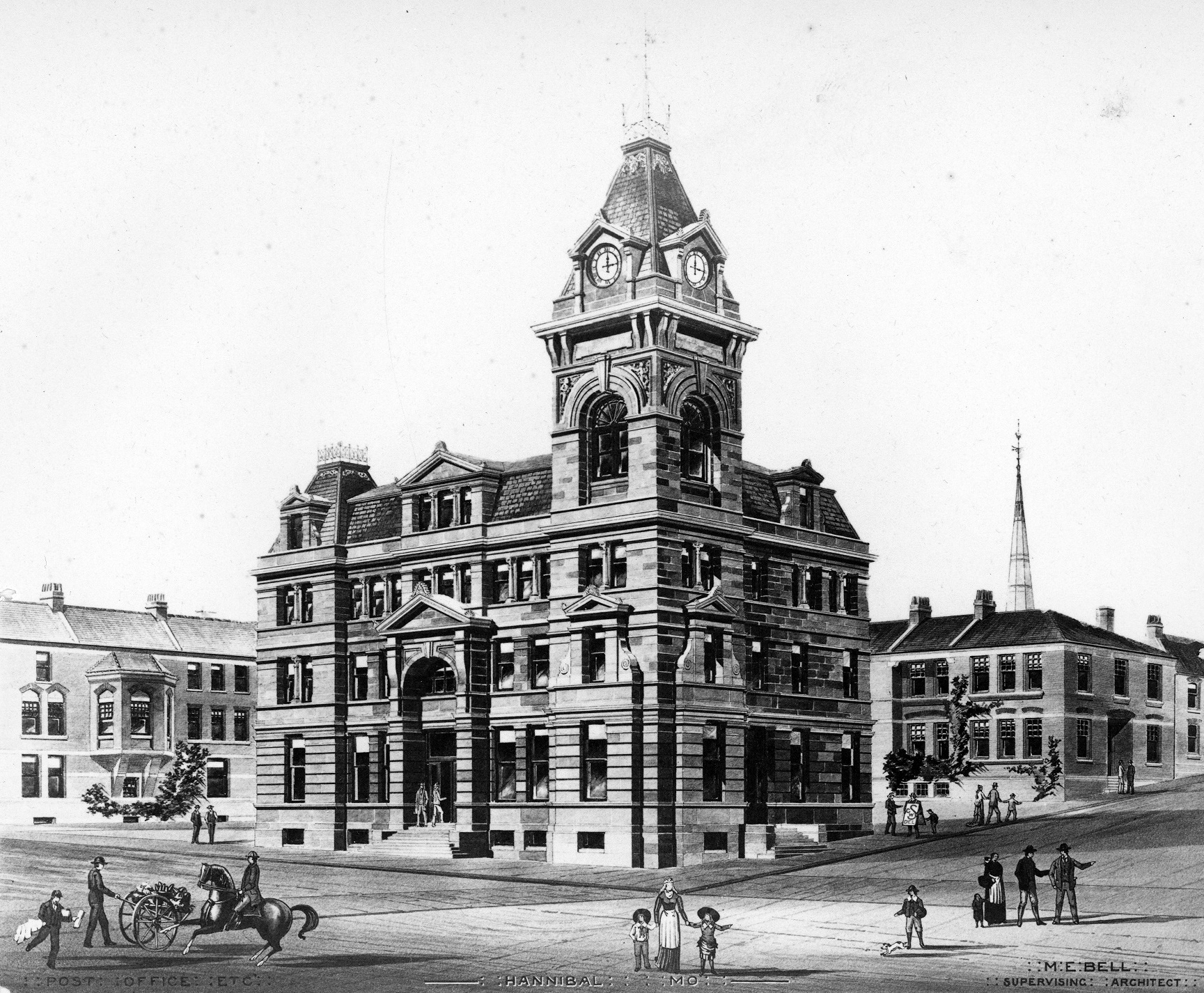
U.S. Post Office, Hannibal, Missouri, a late Second Empire style

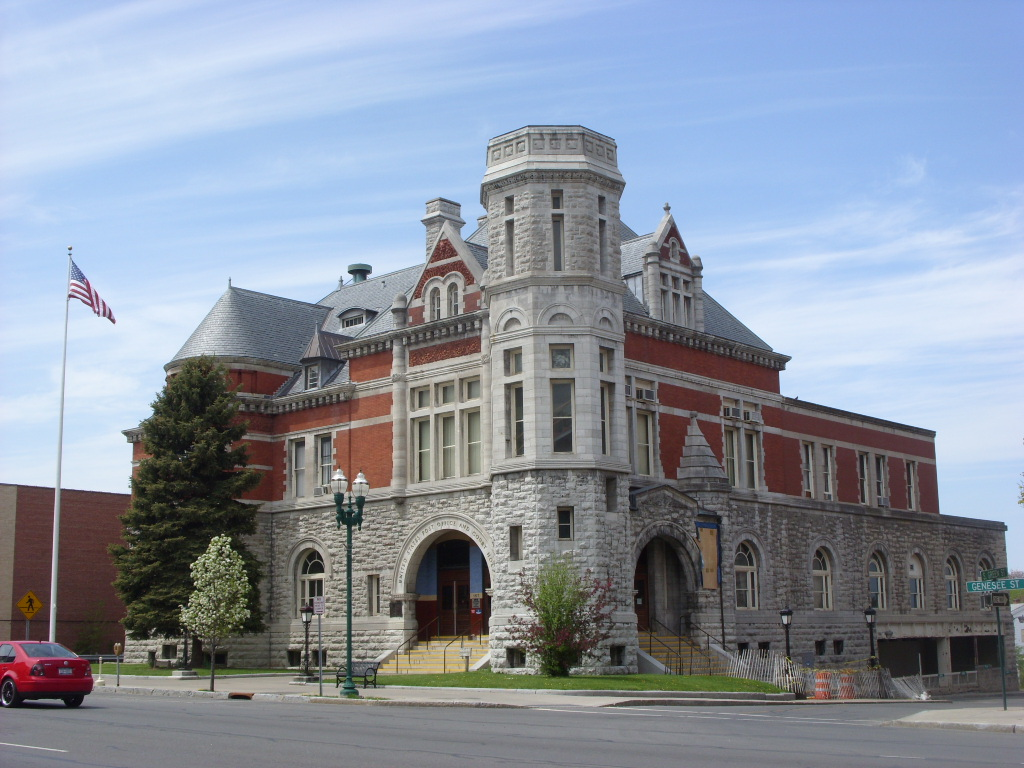
U.S. Post Office, Former, and Federal Courthouse, Auburn, New York, a late Richardsonian Romanesque style

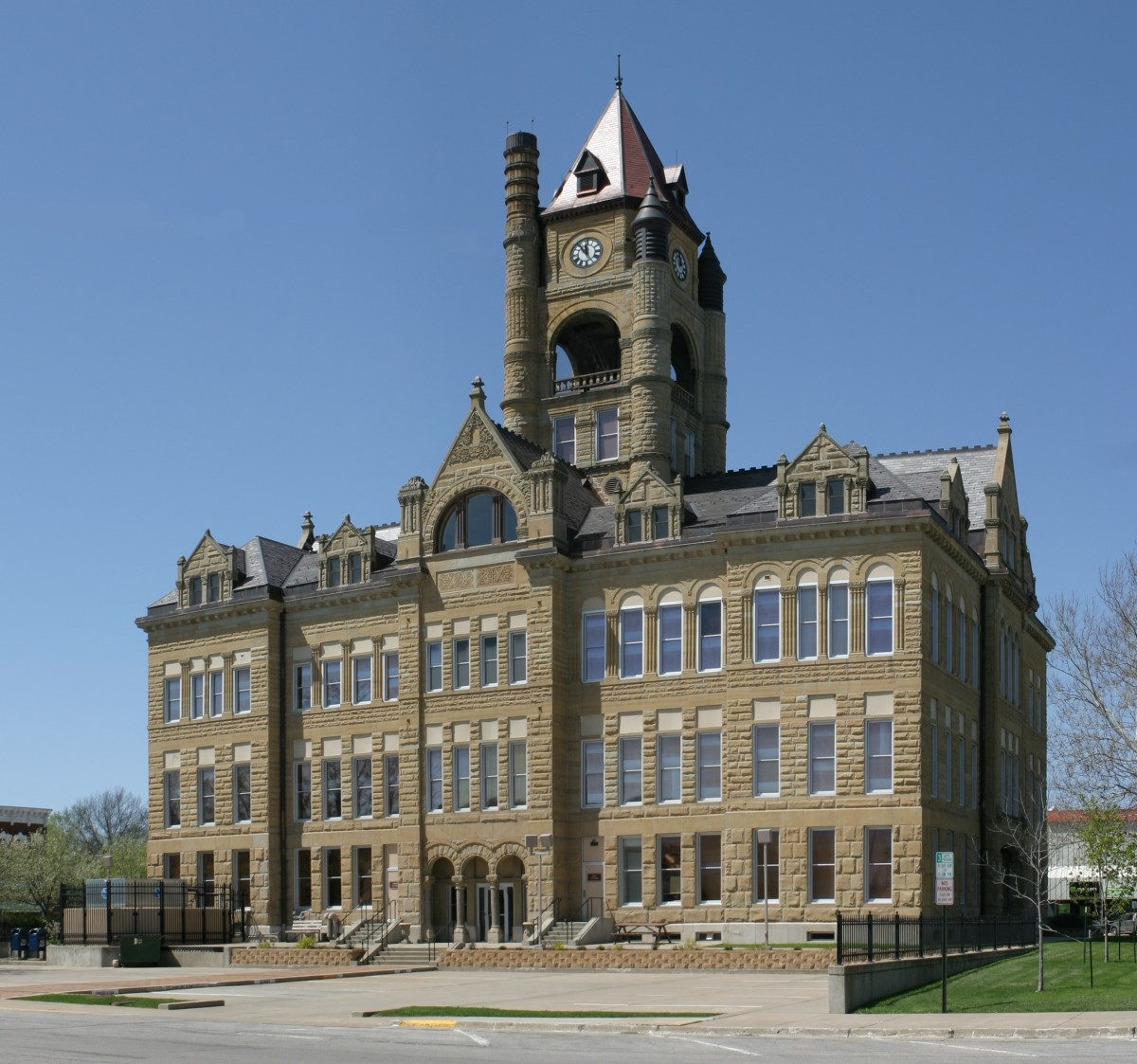
Marion County, Iowa Courthouse; Knoxville, Iowa Richardsonian Romanesque Marion County Courthouse

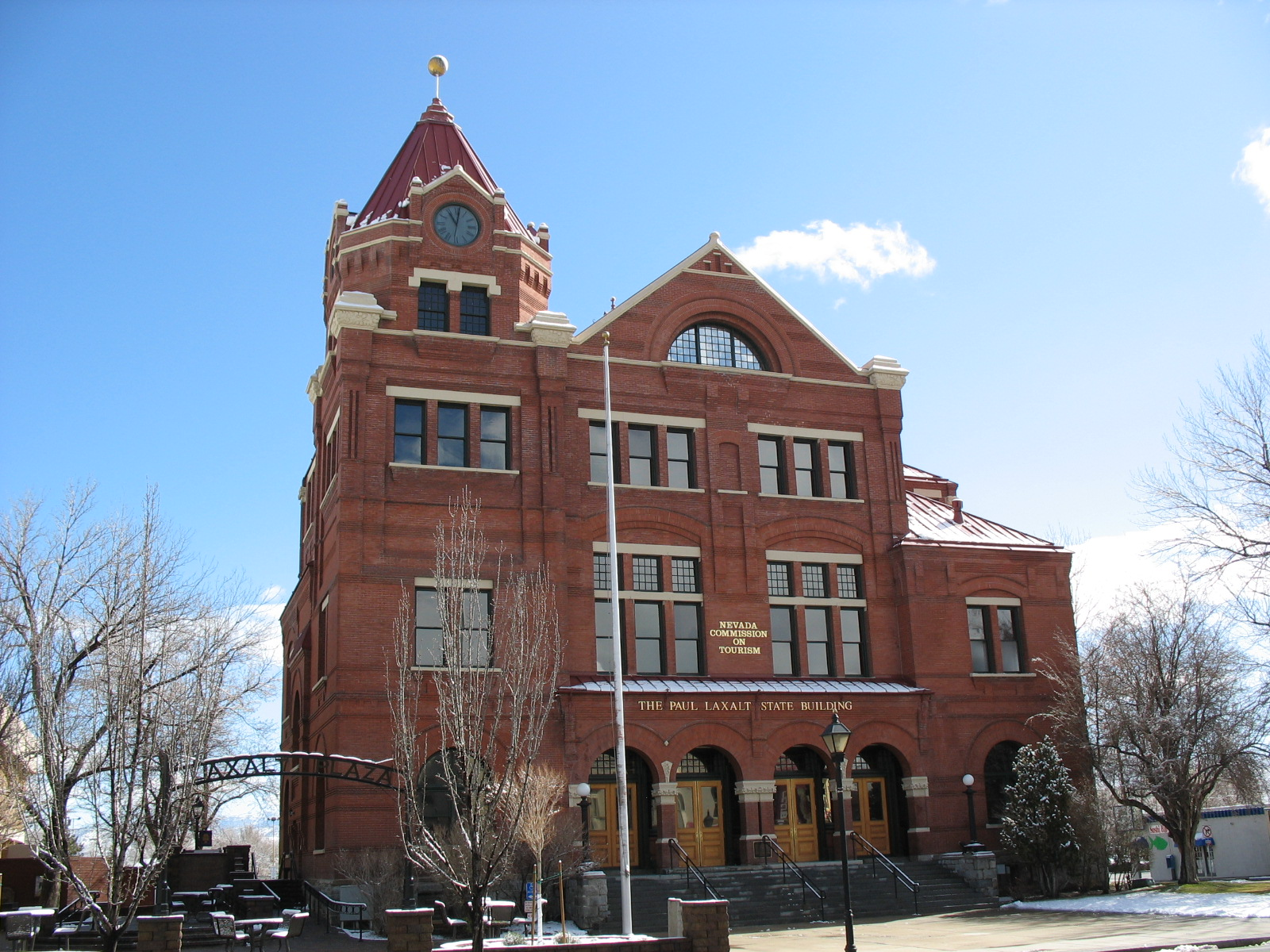
Paul Laxalt State Building - formerly the U.S. Court House & Carson City Post Office, now home to the Nevada Commission on Tourism in Carson City, Nevada

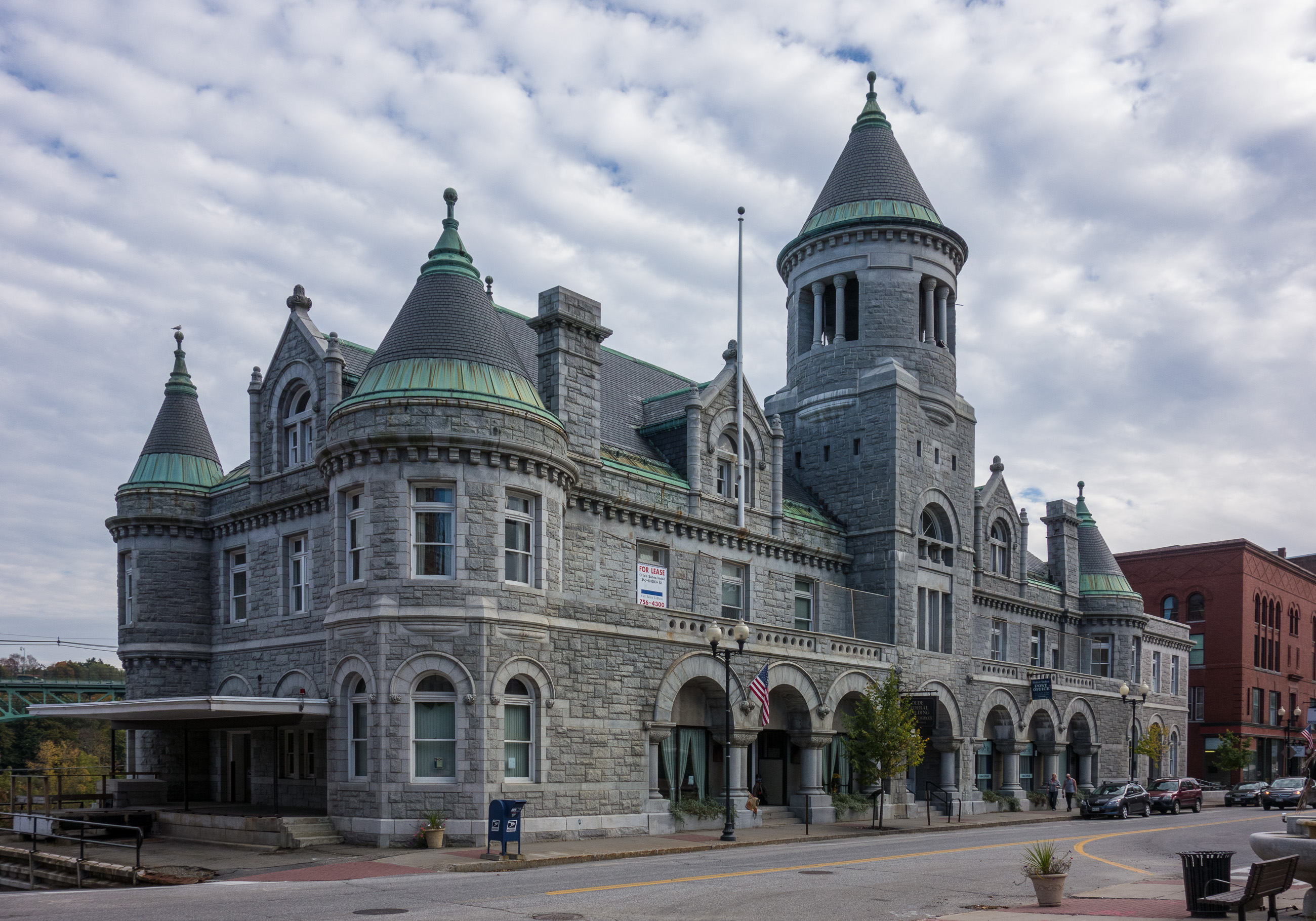
U.S. Court House and Post Office in Augusta, Maine photographed in 2013.

Preceded by James G. Hill	Office of the Supervising Architect; 1883–1886	Succeeded by William A. Freret
