= Old Post Office and Courthouse (Auburn, New York) =

- Former US Post Office and Federal Courthouse
- U.S. National Register of Historic Places
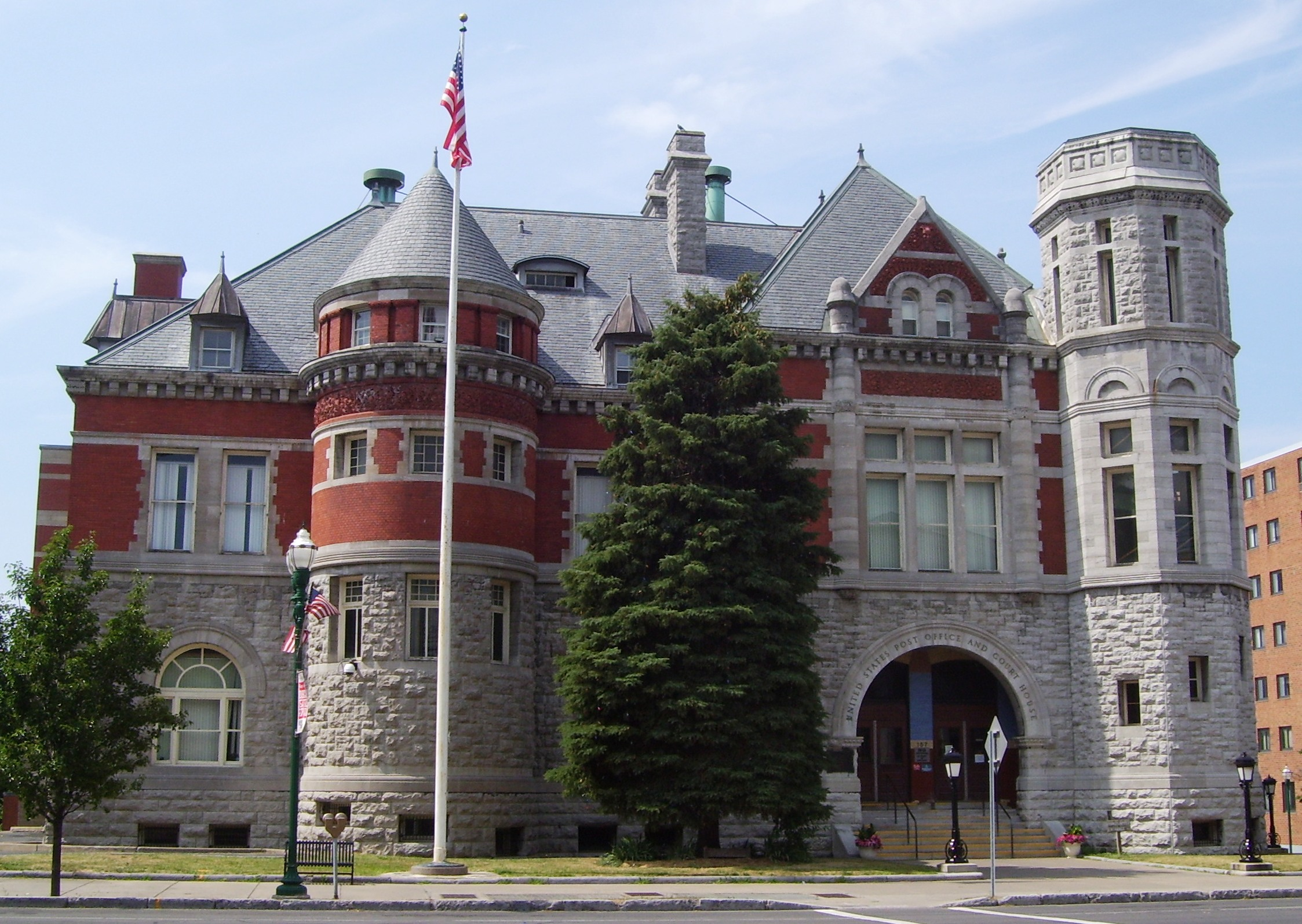
- (2009)

- Location within New York Location within the United States
- Interactive map showing the location for Old Post Office and Courthouse, Auburn
- Location: 151–157 Genesee St. Auburn, New York
- Coordinates: 42°55′49″N 76°34′12″W
- Built: 1888–1890
- Architect: Mifflin E. Bell (main block); James M. Elliot (1914 addition)
- Architectural style: Queen Anne, Romanesque, Richardsonian Ramanesque
- NRHP reference No.: 91000722
- Added to NRHP: June 11, 1991

The Old Post Office and Courthouse is a historic courthouse and former post office located at 157 Genesee Street in Auburn, New York. It was built in 1888–1890 and was designed by the Office of the Supervising Architect of the Treasury Department, Mifflin E. Bell, in the Richardsonian Romanesque style. The limestone-and-brick building was expanded in 1913–1914, designed by James M. Elliot, and again in 1937. It serves as a courthouse of the United States District Court for the Northern District of New York. The massive, asymmetrical, 2 1/2-story main block (1888) includes a 3-story tower at the southwest corner, a 2 1/2-story stair tower, and two massive Richardsonian Romanesque–style entrances.

The building was surplussed by the Federal government in the 1980s and acquired by Cayuga County. It was listed on the National Register of Historic Places in 1991.

== See also ==
- National Register of Historic Places listings in Cayuga County, New York
