= Old DuPage County Courthouse =

- DuPage County Courthouse
- U.S. National Register of Historic Places
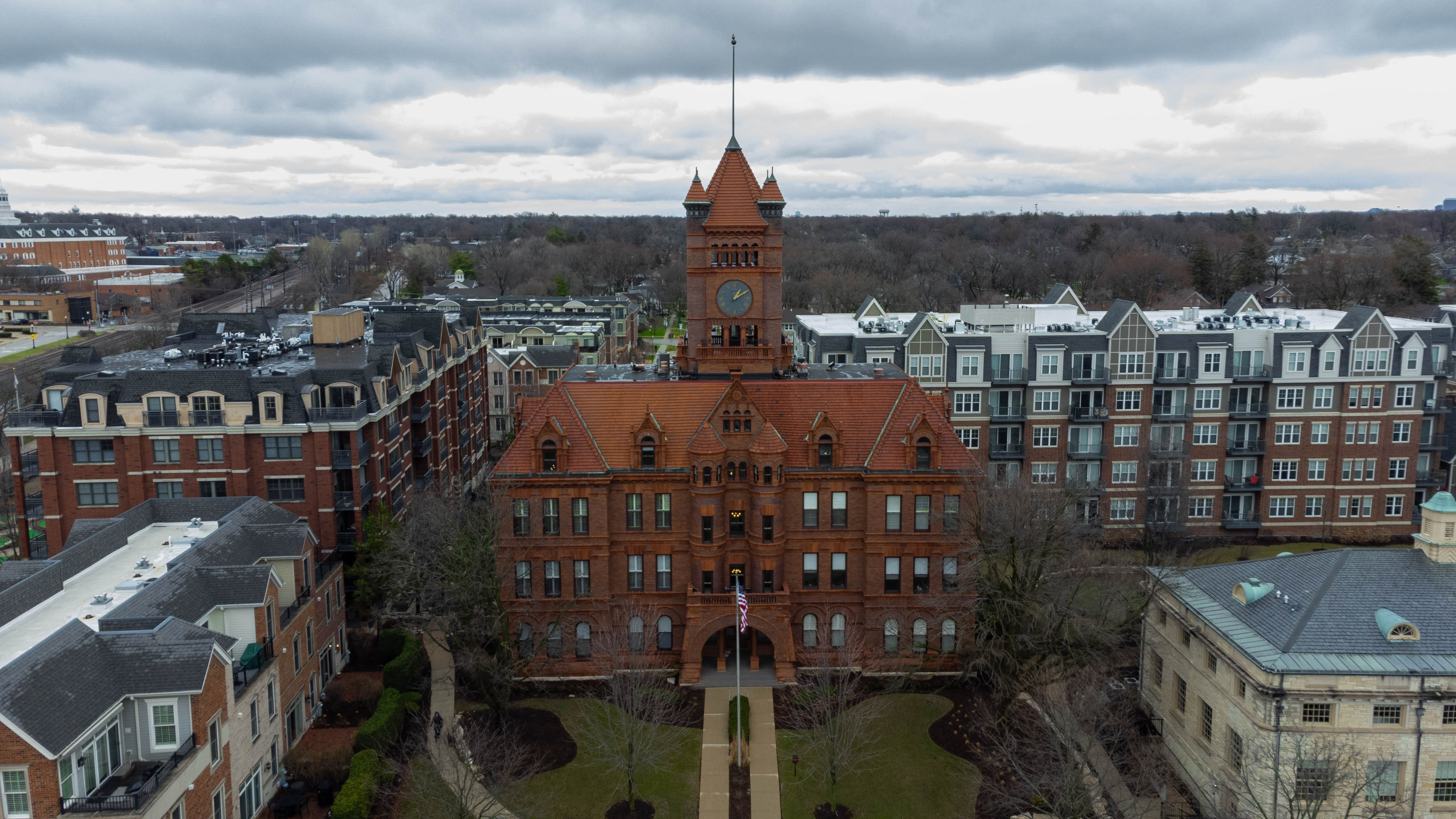

- Location within Illinois
- Interactive map showing the location of DuPage County Courthouse
- Location: 200 Reber Street, Wheaton, Illinois
- Coordinates: 41°51′50″N 88°6′14″W
- Built: 1896; 130 years ago
- Architect: Mifflin E. Bell
- Architectural style: Richardsonian Romanesque
- NRHP reference No.: 78003107
- Added to NRHP: June 7, 1978

The Old DuPage County Courthouse is a Richardsonian Romanesque style court house designed by Mifflin E. Bell in Wheaton, Illinois, United States. The building served as the seat of government for DuPage County, Illinois from its construction in 1896, until a new courthouse was built in 1990.

== History ==
The original DuPage County Courthouse was built in 1868 on land purchased from Warren L. Wheaton. A new DuPage County Courthouse replaced this structure in 1896 and housed many important events. Clarence Darrow defended George Munding in a trial in 1924 that made regional headlines. The first sentencing in Illinois of a convicted criminal to go to the electric chair occurred here in 1931. A jailhouse annex was constructed in 1959, although it was later demolished. The courthouse operated until 1990, when the present day DuPage County Courthouse was built. In danger of being demolished, the building was listed on the National Register of Historic Places in 1978. A lightning strike in 1988 destroyed the original tower, though it was subsequently rebuilt. National Louis University purchased the building in 1993 to operate as a satellite campus. In the mid-2000s, the building sold again and converted into condominiums.

Built of red brick, the building features a bell tower and multiple turrets. These features were included in the building's design to give it the appearance of a castle, which was intended as representative of the building's purpose of defending law and justice. The interior of the ground floor features marble wall panels that rise 4 feet (1.2 m) along the walls. It is one of the only Richardsonian Romanesque buildings in Northern Illinois. The duration of the style's popularity was short and the buildings were expensive to construct.
