= List of United States post offices in Washington =

United States post offices operate under the authority of the United States Post Office Department (1792–1971) or the United States Postal Service (since 1971). Historically, post offices were usually placed in a prominent location. Many were architecturally distinctive, including notable buildings featuring Beaux-Arts, Art Deco, and Vernacular architecture. However, modern U.S. post offices were generally designed for functionality rather than architectural style.

Following is a list of United States post offices in Washington. Notable post offices include individual buildings, whether still in service or not, which have architectural, historical, or community-related significance. Many of these are listed on the National Register of Historic Places (NRHP) or state and local historic registers. The NRHP also includes a thematic listing, Historic US Post Offices in Washington MPS, that includes 23 structures dating from 1893 to 1941.

Post office	City	Date built	Image	Architect	Notes	Ref.
United States Post Office (Anacortes, Washington)	Anacortes	1938			(Note: Houses the New Deal mural Halibut Fishing by Kenneth Callahan.)	
Auburn Post Office	Auburn	1937		Louis A. Simon, James I. Barnes Co.	(Note: Listed on the National Register of Historic Places) (Note: No longer used as a post office.)	
United States Post Office and Courthouse (Bellingham, Washington), now U.S. Bankruptcy Court for the Western District of Washington.	Bellingham	1912–1913		James Knox Taylor	(Note: Included in the thematic listing, Historic US Post Offices in Washington MPS.)	
United States Post Office-Bremerton Main	Bremerton	1937		Harry B. Carter		
United States Post Office-Camas Main	Camas	1939		Louis A. Simon	(Note: Houses the New Deal mural Beginning of a New World by Douglas Nicholson.)	
Centralia Post Office	Centralia	1937		Louis A. Simon	(Note: Houses the New Deal mural Industries of Lewis County by Kenneth Callahan.)	
Chehalis Post Office	Chehalis	1934		James A. Wetmore		
Chimacum Post Office	Chimacum	1899		unknown		
Clarkston Main Post Office	Clarkston	1941		Louis A. Simon, Neal A. Melick	(Note: Houses the New Deal wooden relief Lewis and Clark by Donlon P. McGovern.)	
United States Post Office-Colfax Main	Colfax	1933		James A. Wetmore		
United States Post Office-Colville Main	Colville	1936–1938		Louis A. Simon	(Note: Houses the New Deal mural Hudson’s Bay – The Pathfinders by Edmond J. Fitzgerald.)	
Doe Bay General Store and Post Office	Doe Bay	1908		Viereck family		
Ellensburg Federal Building and Post Office	Ellensburg	1916–1917		James A. Wetmore		
U.S. Post Office and Customshouse (Everett, Washington)	Everett	1917		Oscar Wenderoth		
United States Post Office-Hoquiam Main	Hoquiam	1932		James A. Wetmore		
United States Post Office-Kelso Main	Kelso	1936		Louis A. Simon	(Note: Houses the New Deal mural Incidents in the Lives of Lewis and Clark by David McCosh.)	
United States Post Office-Longview Main	Longview	1934		Bebb, Gould & Graham		
United States Post Office-Lyden Main	Lyden	1940		Louis A. Simon	(Note: Houses the New Deal mural Three Ages of Phoebe Goodell Judson by Mordi Gassner.)	
United States Post Office-Montesano Main	Montesano	1935		Louis A. Simon		
United States Post Office-Okanogan Main	Okanogan	1940		Louis A. Simon		
United States Post Office (Olympia, Washington)	Olympia	1914		James Knox Taylor, Oscar Wenderoth		
United States Post Office-Omak Main	Omak	1941		Louis A. Simon		
United States Post Office (Pasco, Washington)	Pasco	1934				
United States Post Office (Port Angeles, Washington)	Port Angeles	1931		James A. Wetmore		
United States Post Office – Port Townsend Main	Port Townsend	1889–1893		Mifflin E. Bell, Willoughby J. Edbrooke		
United States Post Office-Prosser Main	Prosser	1935		Louis A. Simon		
United States Post Office-Pullman	Pullman	1930		James A. Wetmore		
United States Post Office (Puyallup, Washington)	Puyallup	1935–1936		Lous A. Simon, Neal A. Melick, Thomas Harlan Ellett		
United States Post Office-Raymond Main	Raymond	1939–1940		Lous A. Simon, Neal A. Melick	(Note: Houses a New Deal artwork.)	
Queen Anne Post Office and Regional Headquarters	Seattle	1965		Thomas Albert Smith, John Stevenson		
University Station Post Office (Seattle, Washington)	Seattle	1937			(Note: Houses the New Deal murals Historical Review of Education and Present Day Education and Present Day Education by Jacob Elshin.)	
United States Post Office-Sedro Woolley Main	Sedro-Woolley	1939		Louis A. Simon	(Note: Houses the New Deal mural Loggers and Millworkers by Albert C. Runquist.)	
United States Post Office (Shelton, Washington)	Shelton	1938			(Note: Houses the New Deal mural Skid Row by Richard Haines.)	
Old Post Office, now Snohomish City Hall	Snohomish	1938			(Note: Houses the New Deal mural Construction of a Skid Road in the 80’s by Lance W. Hart.)	
United States Post Office, Courthouse, and Custom House (Spokane, Washington)	Spokane	1908–1909		James Knox Taylor		
United States Post Office-Sunnyside Main	Sunnyside	1937		Louis A. Simon		
United States Post Office-Tacoma Downtown Station-Federal Building	Tacoma	1910		James Knox Taylor		
United States Post Office-Toppenish Main	Toppenish	1937–1938		Louis A. Simon	(Note: Houses the New Deal mural Local Theme by Andrew McDuffie Vincent.)	
United States Post Office-Vancouver Main	Vancouver	1918		James A. Wetmore		
United States Post Office-Walla Walla Main	Walla Walla	1914		James Knox Taylor		
United States Post Office and Annex, now Wenatchee Valley Museum & Cultural Center	Wenatchee	1937–1938, 1918		James A. Wetmore, Louis A. Simon	(Note: Houses the New Deal mural The Saga of Wenatchee by Peggy Strong.)	
U.S. Post Office and Courthouse, now William O. Douglas Federal Building	Yakima	1912		James Knox Taylor		
