= Centralia Post Office =

NRHP-listed site in Washington, US

- U.S. National Register of Historic Places
- Washington State Heritage Register
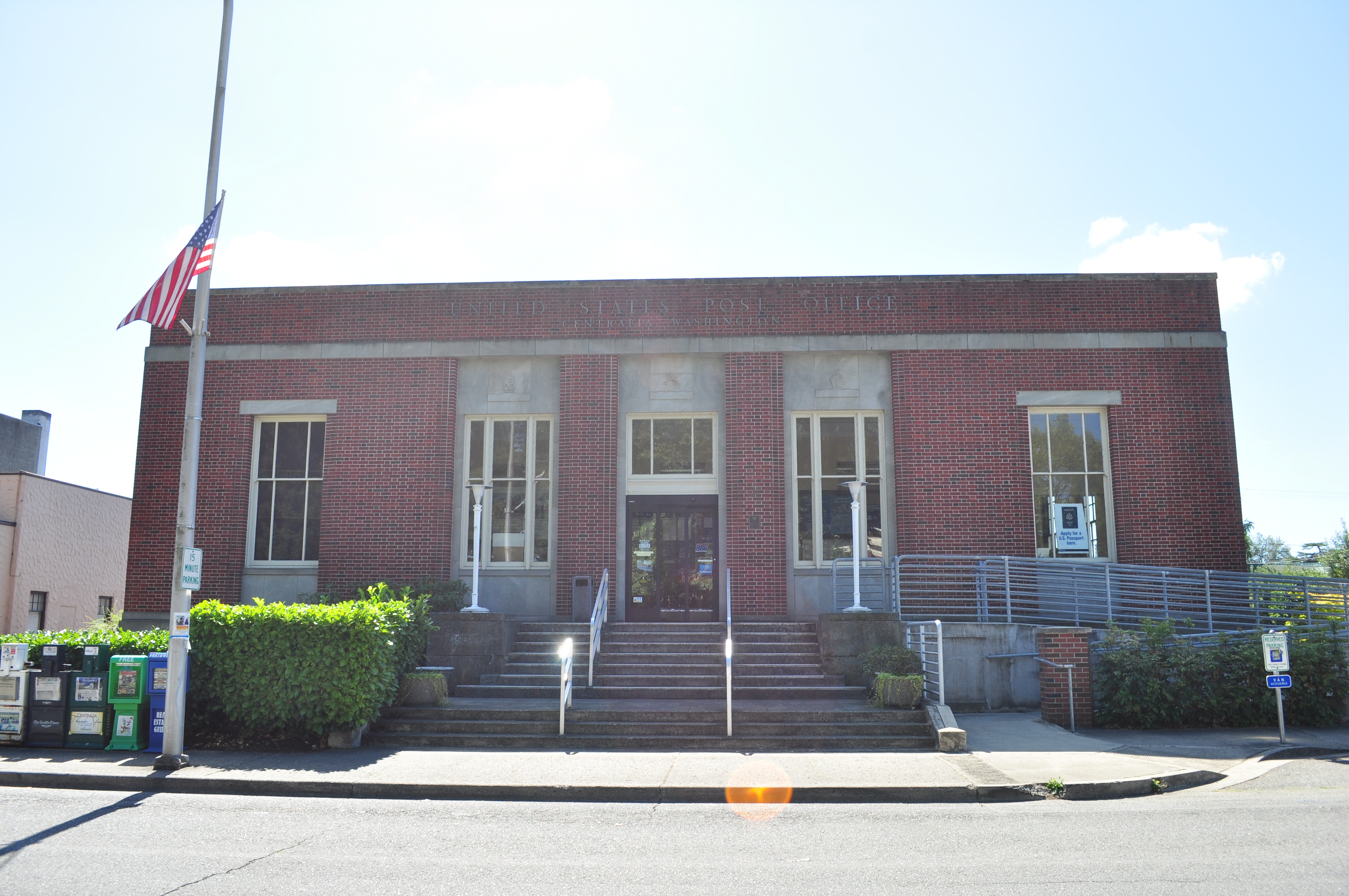
- The NRHP post office in Centralia, Washington

- Location within Washington (state)
- Location: 214 West Locust St., Centralia, Washington
- Coordinates: 46°42′56″N 122°57′20″W
- Area: 0.5 acres (0.20 ha)
- Built: 1937
- Built by: Harry Boyer and Sons
- Architect: Louis A. Simon
- Architectural style: Moderne
- Website: branch website
- MPS: Historic US Post Offices in Washington MPS
- NRHP reference No.: 91000640

Significant dates
- Added to NRHP: August 7, 1991
- Designated WSHR: August 7, 1991

The Centralia Post Office is a federal post office in Centralia, Washington. The building was added to the National Register of Historic Places (NRHP) in 1991.

Centralia's post office history began with delivered mail possibly as early as 1851, with an official post office created in 1857 that was located at Fords Prairie under the name, Skookumchuck. Before the federal post office was constructed, the mail center shifted locations more than a dozen times and often in just a year's time. As the city of Centralia was formed, post office locations became more stable but continued to relocate. With exception of a brief closure between 1865 and 1866, the Centralia post office system has operated continuously since October 1854.

The Centralia MPO, as it is listed in the NRHP form, was completed in 1937 after several attempts to provide a permanent post office building to the city. Featuring Tenino sandstone details, the $76,000 red brick structure's architecture is considered Moderne and Starved classical. The one-story building is noted for its sandstone relief panels featuring important modes of transportation of the time and a large granite stairway. The interior features a large mural, Industries of Lewis County, created by Kenneth Callahan. Outside of necessary upgrades and renovations for issues relating to age or lack of space, the post office is considered to be in a mostly unaltered state.

The federal building is located near two NRHP-listed sites, the Centralia Downtown Historic District and the sculpture, The Sentinel, located across from the post office in George Washington Park.

== History ==
=== Early post offices in Centralia ===
Settlers received their mail in the 1840s by traveling to Fort Vancouver. Mail delivery in the area before Centralia was officially created is reported as beginning as early as 1851 with delivery by mule noted in 1854. With road improvements in what was then known as the Cowlitz Corridor between Fort Vancouver and New Market, the first official post office was the Skookumchuck Post Office, formed on October 10, 1857 under postmaster Charles Van Wormer at Fords Prairie, serving the early community of Centralia and surrounding homesteads. (Note: An early Skookumchuck postmaster is reported to have included John Buchanan, a homesteader on the Vancouver-Tumwater stage line.)

Over the next decade, the post office moved numerous times under several postmasters. In 1863, the office was relocated around Fort Borst under postmaster William F. Donk, only for the location to move back to the Skookumchuck site three months later under Robert Huss. Another postmaster, Robert Brown, shifted the post office near the Thurston-Lewis county line in 1864, remaining at the location until the office was discontinued on September 29, 1865; the reasons for the closure have been lost. Centralia residents received their mail at Claquato after the closure with deliveries marked "in care of Grand Mound".

Postmaster James Frame reopened the post office in May 11, 1866, near Fort Borst once again. The post office moved to the home of James and Mary Tullis in July 1867, located at First Street and Euclid Way. (Note: The Tullis post office was also mentioned as being on the corner of K Street and known as "the Cochran place".) The Tullis family shifted the location of the post office several times under their stewardship. The mail service, under postmaster Isaac Wingard, was moved in 1873 to Main Street and Tower Avenue, then known as Front Street, only to be relocated by a new postal manager, Clanrick Crosby Jr., the next year to a different block on Tower Avenue. The 1874 location began using the Centralia name.

Centerville was officially platted in 1875, with the town officially changing its name to Centralia in 1883 due in part to mail delivery confusion as a Centerville existed in eastern Washington. After a change in postmaster duties to William Woodham in 1885, the location was changed to another Tower Avenue site in 1886 under David Fouts. (Note: Postmaster Woodham is sometimes reported under the name Woodbarn. Likewise, Postmaster Fouts is recorded as Fontz.) The remaining years in the 1880s saw postmaster duties change to John T. Shelton and Francis M. Rhodes, who oversaw the beginnings of money orders in the city; the first money order, totaling $6, was sold on August 12, 1890.

Up until 1890, the Centralia post offices were considered fourth class but graduated to third level status under Henry M. Ingraham. He moved the office once more to a building on West Pine Street. During the decade, postmaster appointments shifted to John Laraway and then Colonel John M. Benedict.

Benedict moved the office in February 1907 to the Gingrich store at Tower and Main, while overseeing expansion of delivery services and routes as well as accomplishing a postal ranking of second class in 1907. The increase in status allowed the post office to gain more funding, which was used for light fixtures and a "burglar and fire proof" safe. The additional funds also allowed free mail delivery to city residents. The office at the new location, known as the McNitt block, was divided in two, a section for mail operations and a lobby for customers. The larger venue allowed for additional post office boxes as well as the retention of boxes from the prior post office, increasing the number to 760. The new location was considered modern and boasted several amenities, costing approximately $3,000, that had not been available at the prior post office.

Benedict's son, John, succeeded his father's postmaster position in 1911 and began a postal savings accounts while continuing his father's efforts in the expansion of mail services. The lease at the Gingrich location expired in early 1912 and a postal inspector required a new location with additional floor space. The announcement for rental bids provided numerous details and demands, including furnishings, floorplans, and specifics on location that had to be both close to the Centralia depot and the downtown business section. A new building was constructed on West Main Street and the entire post office was transferred overnight, opening the new location without interruption on May 1, 1912. The $12,000 structure offered quicker services due to partitioned areas and boasted expensive oak details and furnishings. The post office was reported as a "dandy" and that the old post office would be quickly forgotten. An official dedication ceremony, part of the town's "Hub City Festival", was held at the end of the month.

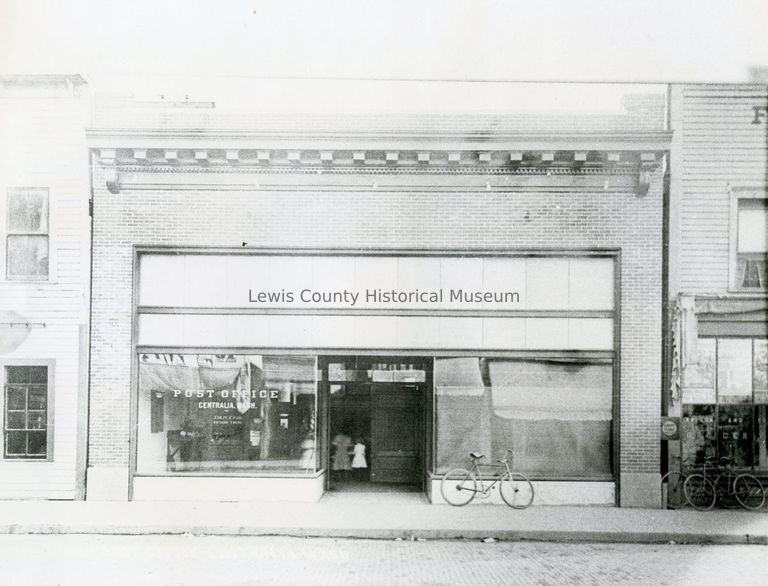
Centralia Post Office, ca. 1915-1916

Despite the new location, a bill was introduced in 1915 to procure $150,000 in funds for an official federal post office building in Centralia. The West Main Street building was not owned by the Centralia Post Office and in August 1916, ownership was traded by A.W. Caveness as part of package for a 200-acre (81 ha) farm in Independence, Oregon.

Delivery by truck was introduced in 1915 and John Benedict, Jr. passed postmaster responsibilities to T.H. McClenry who served until 1922. First class was achieved under the next postmaster, Harry L. Bras, who was succeeded by William F. Scales in 1926. Postmaster Al K. Filson was appointed in 1934.

The office, under a five-year lease, moved again in early 1922 to a "garage building" next to city hall on West Locust Street; the rental agreement renewed annually afterwards, under the condition that a permanent federal office would be built by 1934. With a lack of a government mail facility being erected by that time, the mail station was able to remain at the Locust Street location under a continuing yearly rental agreement, remaining optional per annum until the federal building was completed.

=== Centralia Post Office ===
Requests for the build of a federal post office began in 1931, with an allocation of $110,000. Legislation was introduced in 1933 by House Representative Martin F. Smith to call for official action, with specific concerns over local economic depression and civic pride.

A site for the structure was not chosen until 1935. The 140 ft × 160 ft (43 m × 49 m) lot cost $6,500 with architectural plans for the building being finalized by the end of that year. The supervising architect was Louis A. Simon, a federal employee. Sandstone from Tenino was specifically requested as the main material for the façade though the demand was scaled back; use of the sandstone was to be limited to detail work. In March 1936, the design was publicly announced, with the $100,000 structure to be made of red brick. It was deemed "handsome" and simple in design, and contained "no decorative flourishes or fancy gewgaws" that might "mar" the style of the post office exterior. The contractor, Olympia-based Harry Boyer and Sons, was the low bidder at $62,000 and construction began in July. The post office was one of several Works Progress Administration projects in the city at the time, including an armory, a college gymnasium, golf course, and a viaduct. Upwards of 30 men worked on the construction.

Construction was interrupted for brief periods, due to materials not yet approved by the government or weather-related issues, but work was restarted in February 1937. After an open house attended by approximately 1,500 people at the end of June, the Centralia Post Office was opened on July 1, 1937 under postmaster Al Filson. Built at a final cost of $96,000, the mail room was admittedly still incomplete, mostly due to a delay in the shipment of necessary furniture for mail processing. (Note: The NRHP nomination form lists the opening day of the Centralia Post Office as June 28, 1937.) The opening was considered an 80th anniversary of post offices in the community, coinciding with the original 1857 Skookumchuck office.

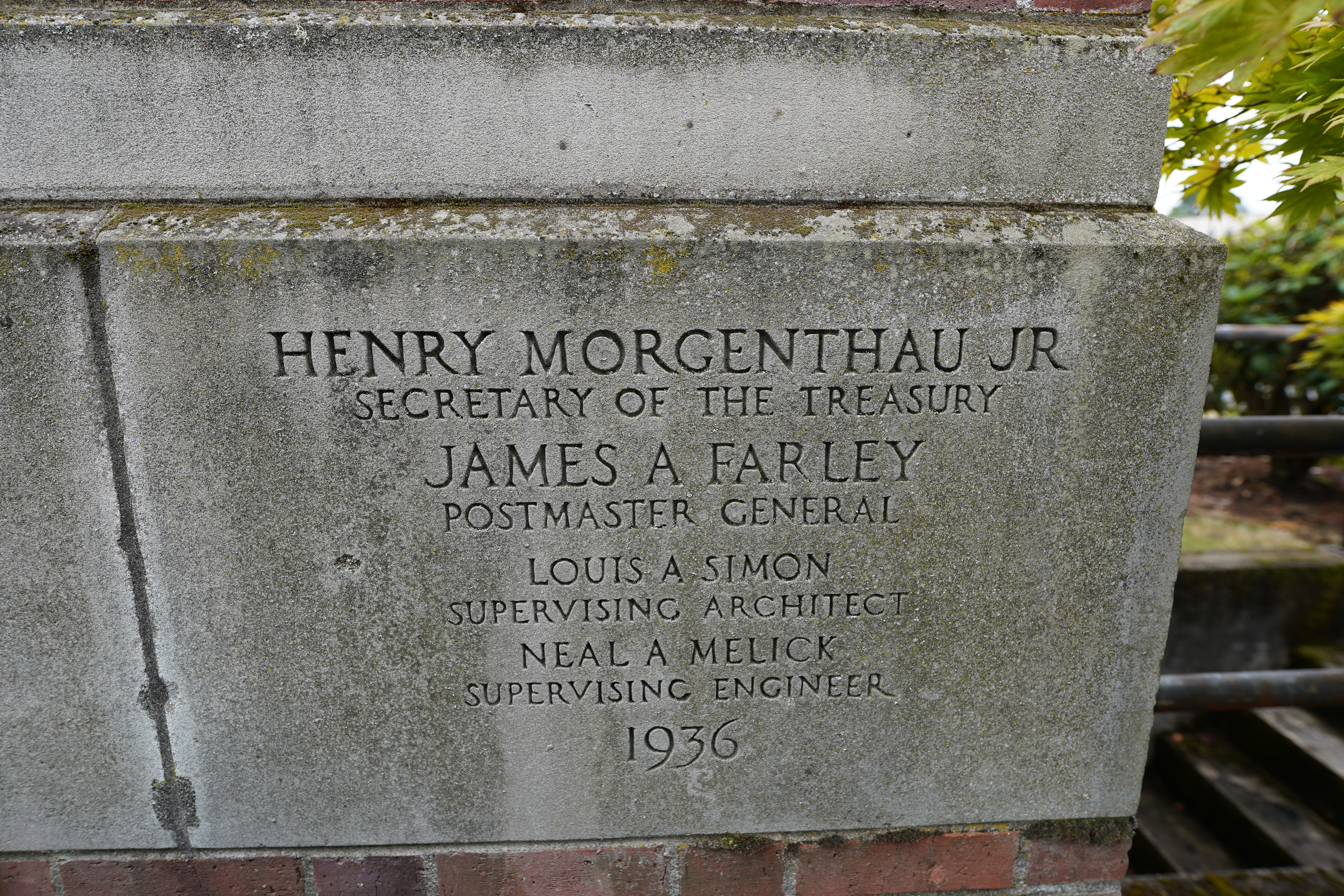
Dedication stone

A dedication ceremony was held on October 15, 1937 led by Postmaster General James A. Farley, whose address was broadcast live on radio station KVI. The postponement was due to the accommodation to Farley's schedule. Farley made remarks on Centralia's post office history, defended postal spending deficits and the high cost of federal post office construction projects, discussed communication competition due to the increasing use of the telephone, and spoke of the economic and social benefits that new post offices provided. United States House Representative Martin F. Smith and Senator Homer Bone were speakers and numerous heads of government agencies and local political leaders were in attendance. The construction costs, including furnishings and fixtures, were recorded at $76,377. The Centralia Post Office was the first, and only remaining, federal building constructed in the city as of the 1991 NRHP nomination.

Due to continuing issues of overcrowding and lack of space, mail operations and deliveries were shifted to an annex located at the Port of Centralia, which was completed in August 1999. Customer and retail services remained at the post office. A considered bonus of the move was the increase in parking due to the lack of delivery trucks at the office.

The United States Postal Service placed the Centralia Post Office for sale in September 2009 as part of a nationwide effort to offset losses from a poor economy in the leadup to the Great Recession, as well as competition from the internet. Several post offices in the state were also considered for sale. Had the transaction been completed, the post office was planned to either move into a store front with limited services or mail deliveries would have been contracted to another entity. The sale was reported as "quietly shelved" by August 2011.

== Postal services history ==
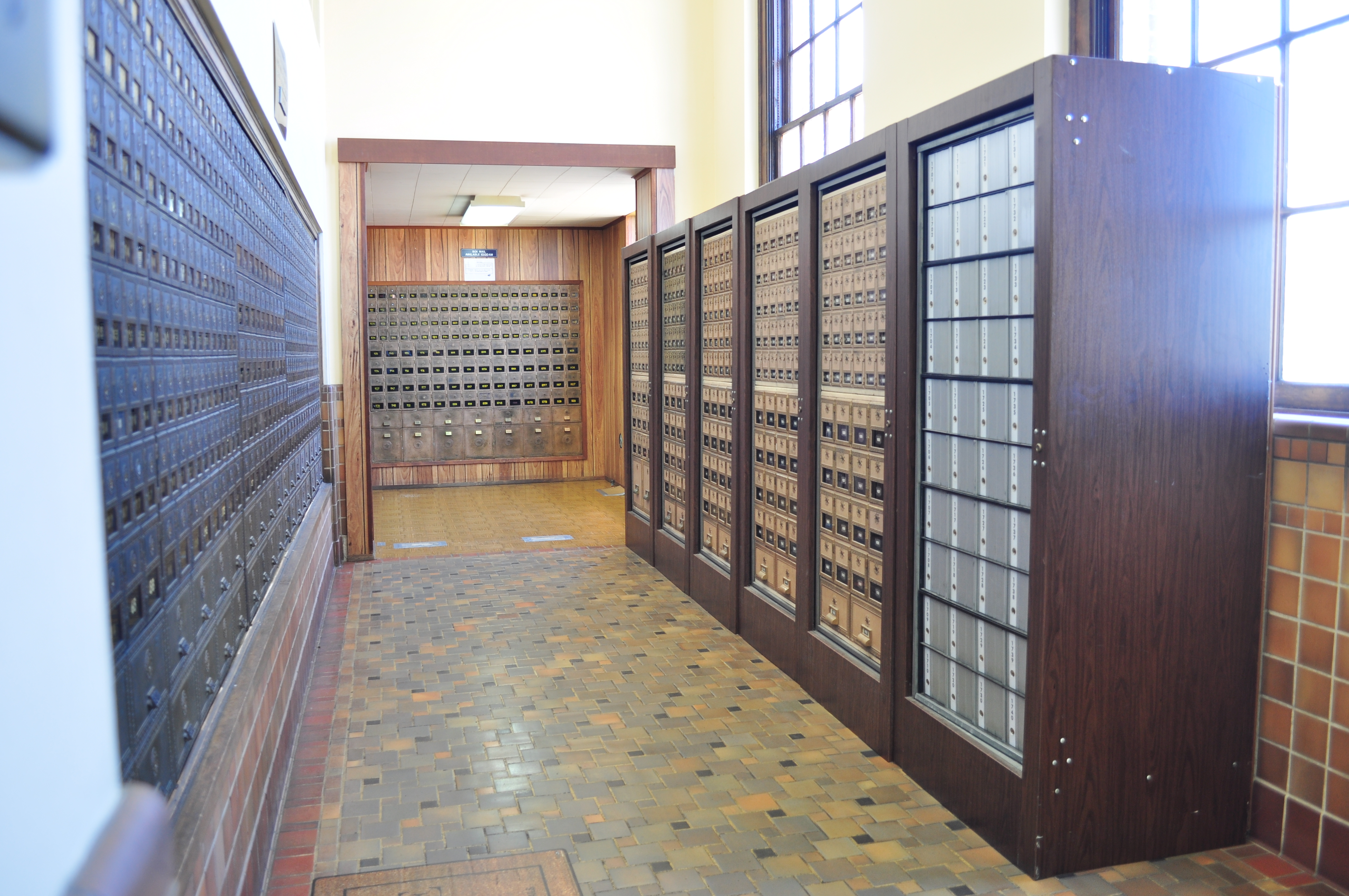
Interior, post office boxes

=== Class ===
Centralia post offices were listed as fourth class until achieving third class status in 1890. The post office graduated to second class by exceeding the $8,000 threshold in 1905. The Centralia MPO became the second post office in Lewis County to achieve the ranking, following the post office in Chehalis. In 1926, the Centralia post office reached $40,000 in receipts, surpassing the minimum mark to achieve first class status. The graduation was official in July 1927.

=== Delivery ===
The first free rural mail service route was begun on October 2, 1905; delivery for city residents started on May 15, 1908. Parcel post was introduced in 1913 and by 1931, the Centralia Post Office was responsible for three rural routes.

=== Notable events and incidents ===
Postmaster John Laraway, described during the time as lacking "good standing" with the federal post office department, was investigated by a special agent about an 1895 robbery of approximately $1,000 from the Chehalis post office. In August 1906, the post office safe was blown open during a robbery. The two thieves, who were captured, stole an unreported amount of money.

Post office boxes at Centralia and Chehalis were broken into by a trio of young teenagers in January 1923. The robberies took place at several different times over two or three days and the group stashed mail throughout Centralia, at times leaving a trail of dropped letters. When asked how they broke into the boxes that contained combination locks, one perpetrator stated, "That's easy."

A Diebold safe, thought to have been transported from one Centralia post office to another since the community's early postal beginnings, had contained a separate, combination-locked compartment thought to be for registered mail. A locksmith was hired in 1969 to open the section, drilling a small hole to reach the locking mechanism; only locks used for registered mail bags were found.

=== Postmarks and stamps ===
The first automated stamp machine was installed in 1960. At first appreciated, the "balky" machine often failed to deliver the correct amount of stamps, frequently providing more postage than payment required, or returning change when not necessary. "Out of order" signs were placed regularly and a postal employee referred to the machine as a "gutless wonder".

The Centralia Post Office was one of three in Washington state to offer a "Postmarks of the Century" stamp in 2000. Recognizing the new century and millennium, the cancellation postmark featured two pictorials denoting the dates of the new year in a digital clock format. Cancellation stamps celebrating the 20th and 25th anniversary of the 1980 Mt. St. Helens eruption were offered by the post office in 2000 and 2005 respectively, with the pictorial designed by an employee of the city's newspaper, The Chronicle.

A special cancellation postmark celebrating the Centralia Union Depot, an NRHP-listed site, was offered in May 2012. The stamp pictured an oncoming steam locomotive and the Centralia Downtown Association supplied postcards featuring historic scenes in the city. A commemorative postmark was offered in August and September 2018 after the unveiling of a bronze statue of Centralia's founders, George and Mary Jane Washington, in the park across from the post office.

=== Receipts ===
The post office began the 20th century by recording over $3,700 in business receipts in 1900, nearly tripling by 1910 to over $10,700. By 1914, receipts totaled just under $25,000. In 1929, the post office peaked with over $43,000 in postal receipts. However, a noticeable decline began in 1930 during the initial stages of the Great Depression, falling to a low of just under $29,000 by 1933. Postal receipts gained at a moderate rate, rebounding to over $40,000 once again in 1936, and reaching $48,000 by 1940. Annually, the Centralia post office came in second to the federal office in Chehalis during the 1930s.

== Geography ==
The Centralia Post Office and its main entrance is located on West Locust Street, also known as Centralia College Boulevard, in Centralia, Washington near the NRHP-listed Centralia Downtown Historic District. The building sits on a corner, bordered to the west by Silver Street and the college's Bob Peters Field. George Washington Park, which contains the NRHP-listed statue, The Sentinel, sits across the street from the main entrance. The eastern portion of the block contains the Pissel-Reynolds Mortuary Building and the old Elks Lodge. A residential area is situated to the south.

== Architecture and features ==
Unless otherwise noted, the details provided are based on the 1991 National Register of Historic Places (NRHP) nomination form and may not reflect updates or changes to the Centralia Post Office, listed as the Centralia MPO, in the interim.

The Centralia Post Office is a single-story structure with a basement, which is slightly exposed and cased in sandstone. The foundation is reinforced concrete supporting steel-framed walls. The roof is flat. The building is considered either under the style of Moderne architecture or Starved classical. Original plans for the building included a mezzanine and was to have a footprint of 68 ft × 65 ft (21 m × 20 m). A 70 foot (21 metres) flag pole is located near the front entrance.

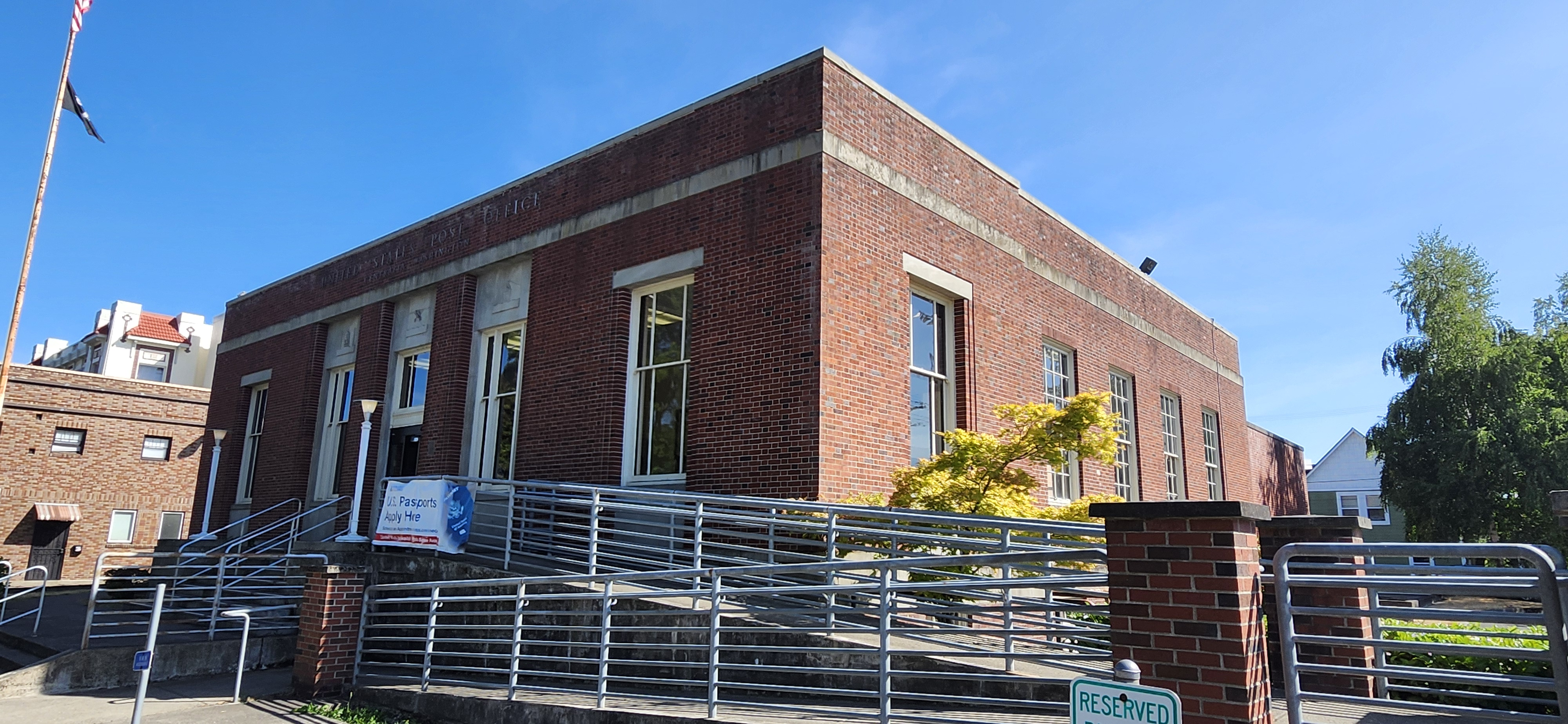
Main entrance, 2025

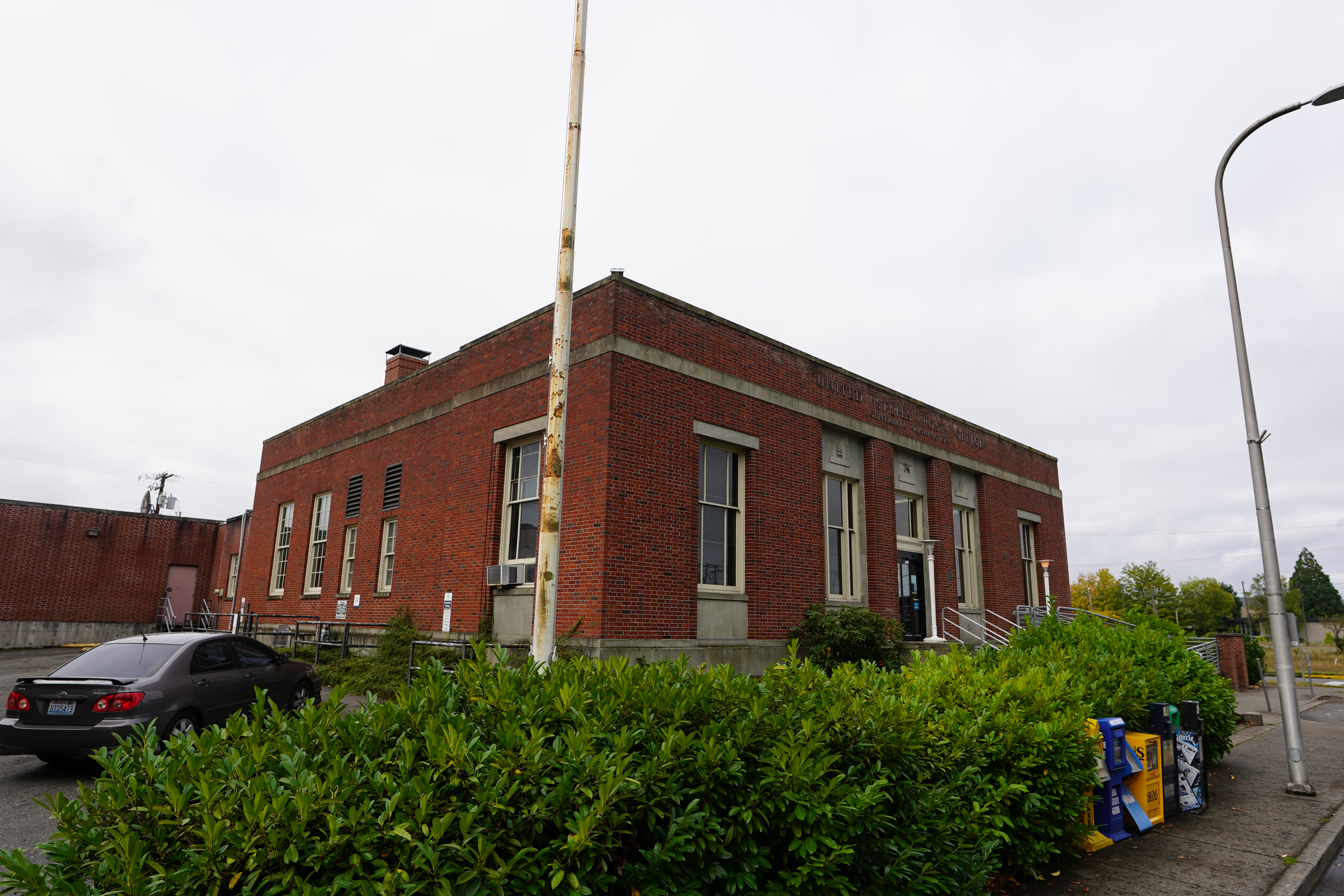
Northeast corner, 2020

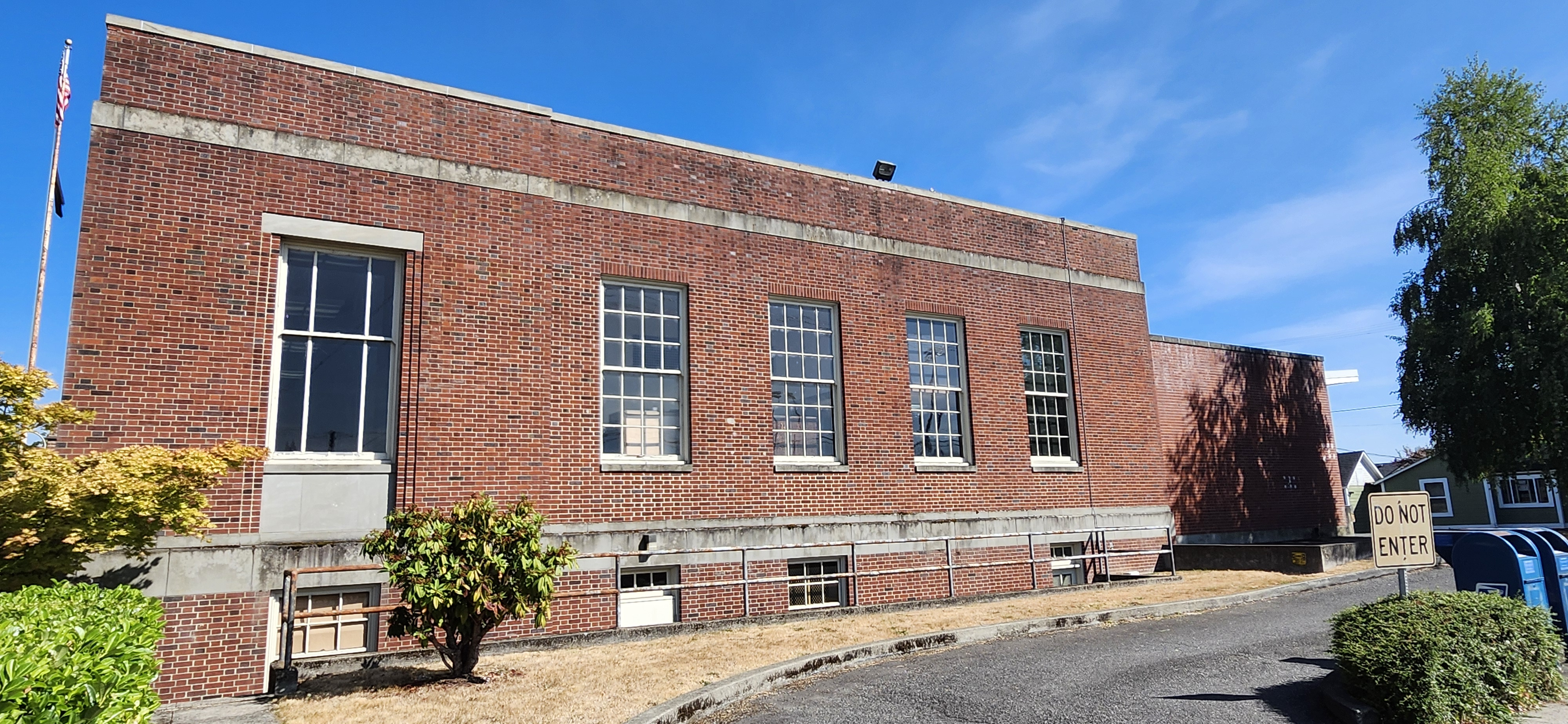
West side with drive thru, 2025

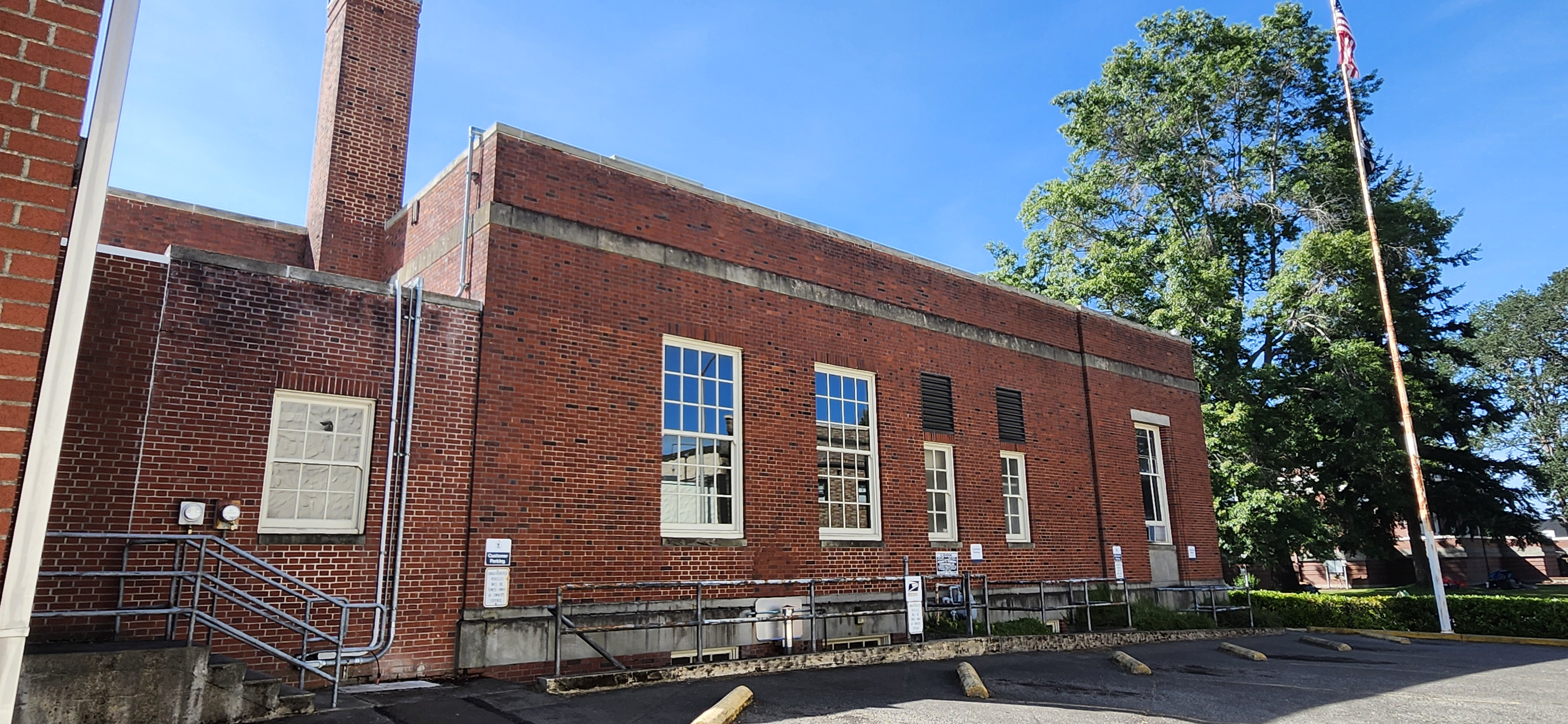
East side, 2025

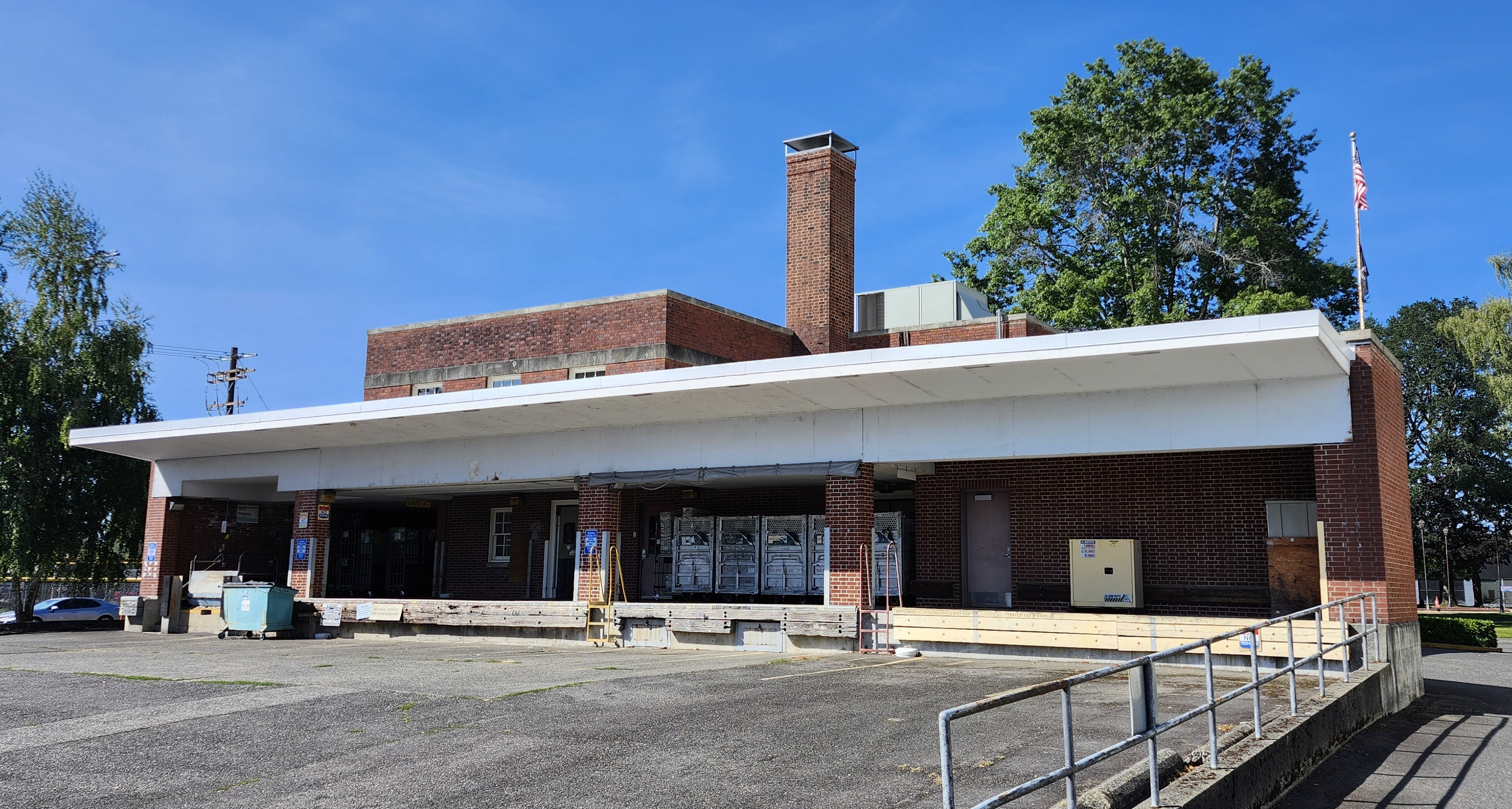
Loading dock, 2025

=== Exterior ===
The exterior of the building is composed of red brick and is considered flat and symmetrical, and mostly without detail, a common style of Moderne architecture. The main stairway and landing is granite, flanked by sandstone buttresses. Bronze light fixtures, styled as torches, sit atop the buttresses. Railings are aluminum. The NRHP form considers the front of the building to be five separate bays, based on the locations of the entrance and flanking windows. The landing and stairs expand between the middle three bays, which include the front door and two, flanking windows.

A total of four equally-sized, three-over-three double-hung windows are located on the front façade, each recessed and framed in sandstone. All windows contain plain, sandstone lintels, sills, and panels. In the sections above the windows that flank the front entrance, square low-relief panels contain a decorative motif. The west panel is that of a locomotive; the east panel contains an ocean steamer. The front double-doors contain a triple-panel transom window. The detail in the relief panel, also of sandstone, is that of an airplane.

A course of sandstone above the windows and entrance leads to a brick parapet capped with sandstone. The course and parapet wraps around the building.

The east and west walls are almost identical, including materials and details. Differences are mostly noted in window casements. Both façades contain matching recessed corner windows seen on the front of the building. The western side features four twelve-over-twelve double-hung wood windows, equally spaced. An extended brick wall, slightly lower and inset, hides the loading dock at the rear. The windows on the eastern side are not set equally, with two located in the center of the wall smaller than the two casements at the back end of the structure. The smaller windows are six-over-six and matching metal louvers are situated above.

The rear of the post office consists entirely of a loading dock with a concrete platform protected by protruding brick walls and a flat roof. Above the roofline sits three six-over-six double-hung windows spaced evenly apart.

The sandstone used on the exterior was quarried from Tenino, Washington.

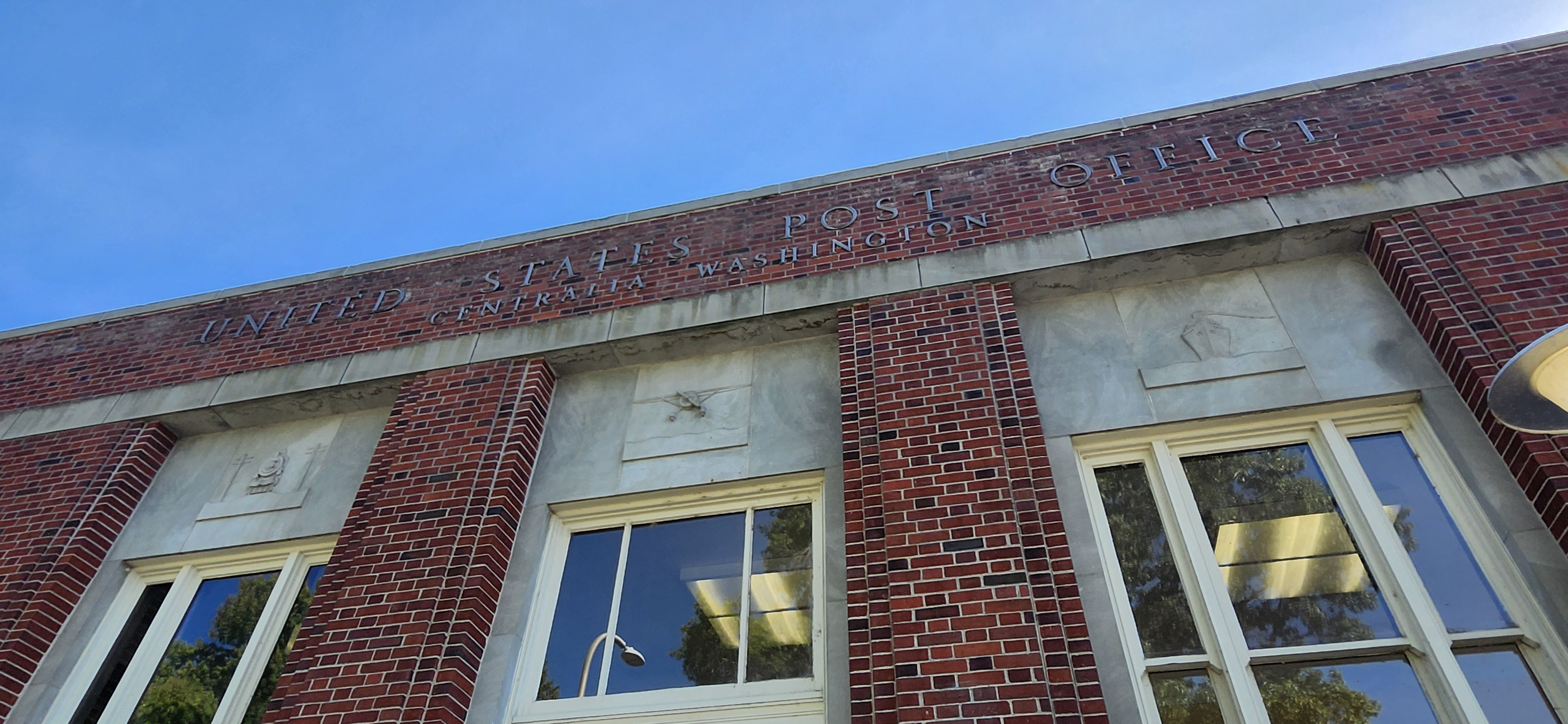
Main entrance, details, 2025

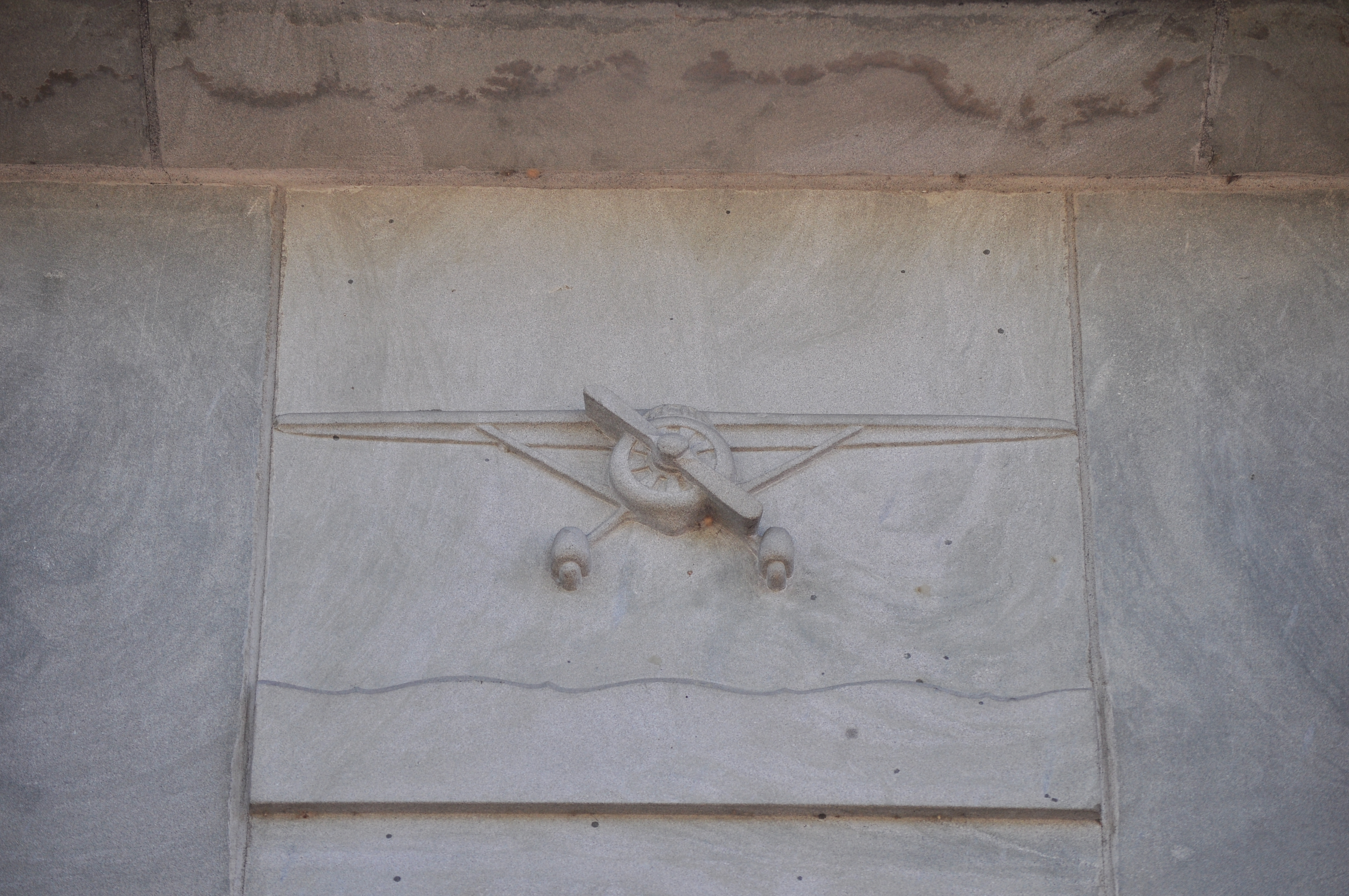
Relief, airplane

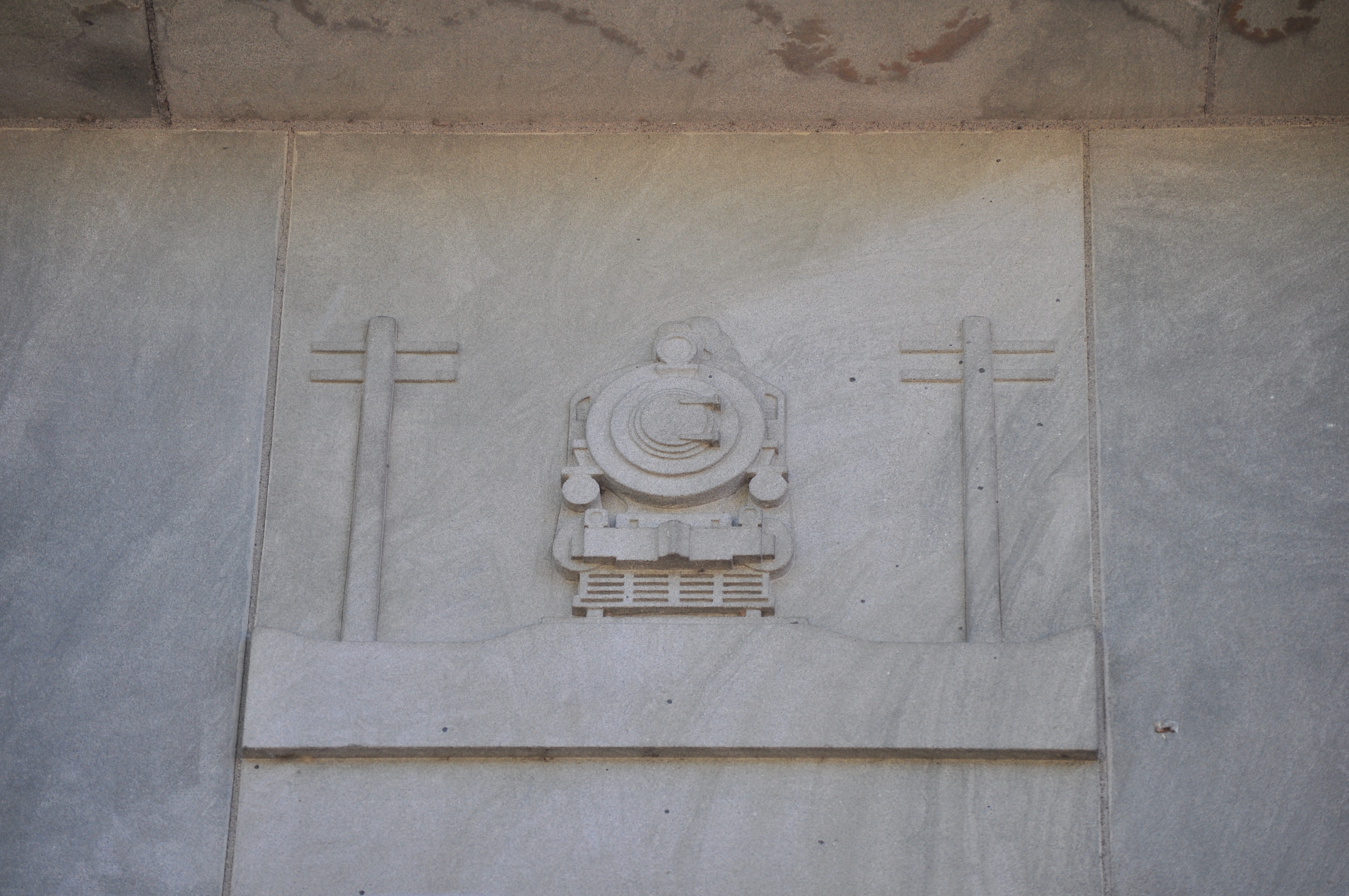
Relief, locomotive

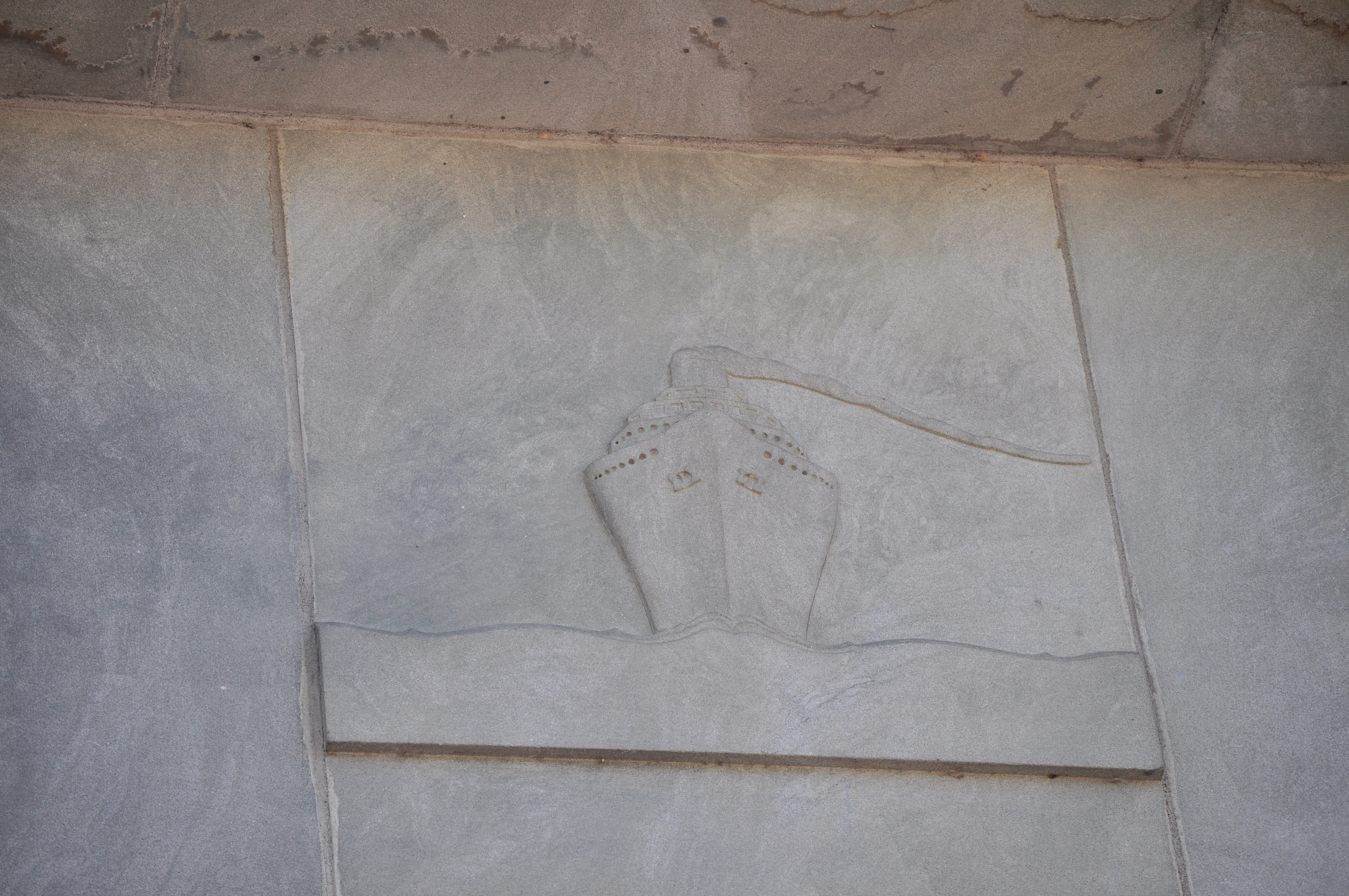
Relief, ocean steamer

=== Renovations and restorations ===
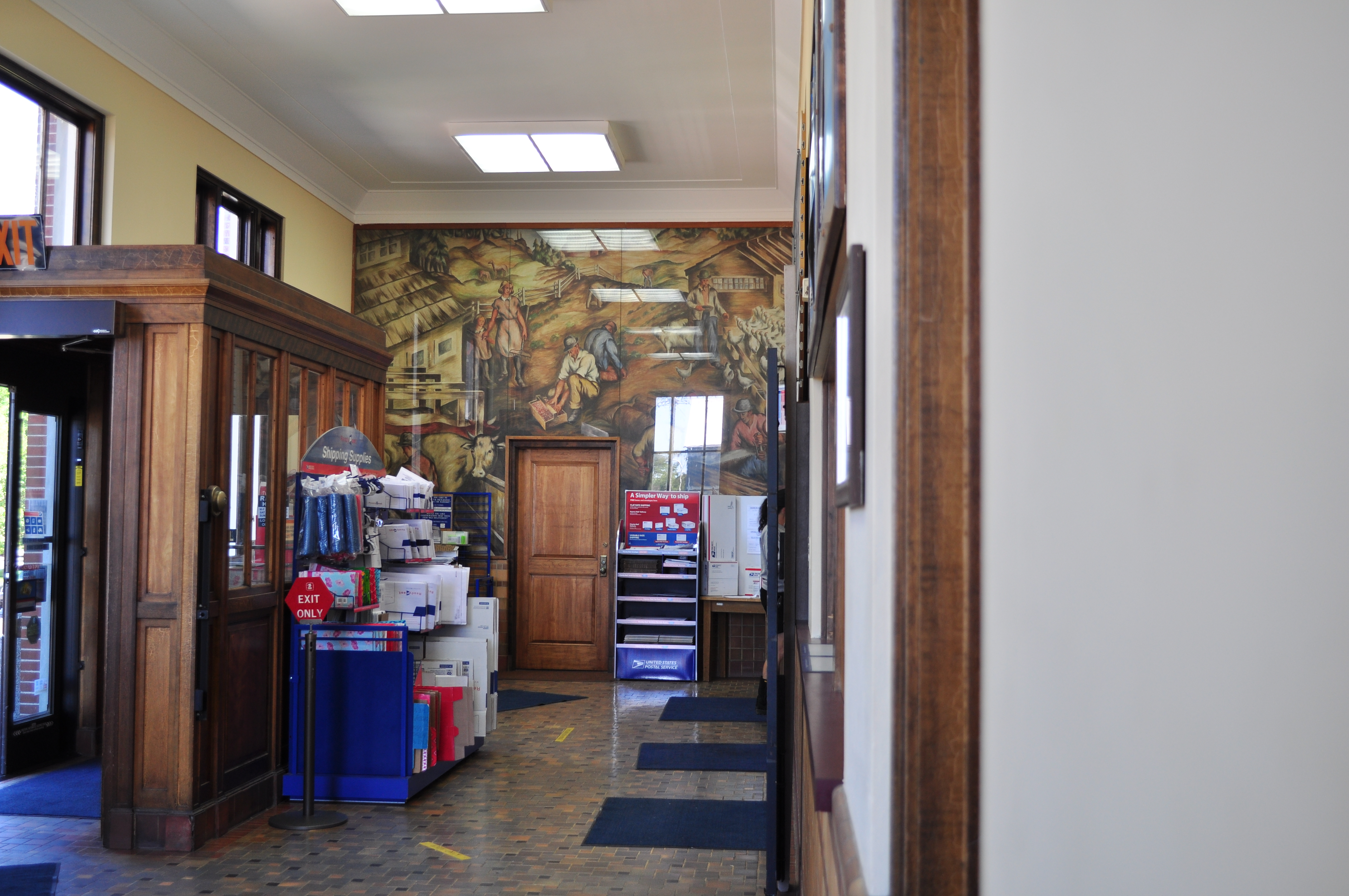
Interior, lobby and main entrance

A storage building was erected on the southeast corner of the site in 1954. The effort also included an improved driveway entrance to the loading dock area.

The first major expansion of the structure was planned in late-1960. Estimated to cost over $240,000, the project was to remodel and upgrade the existing building, including revamping the entrance and lobby. A 42 ft × 76 ft (13 m × 23 m) addition located east of the office was to be used to expand operations due to overcrowded conditions at the site. Planned to be completed by June 1961, the project was cancelled by December 1961 due to "extremely tight budgets" and the idea was ultimately considered unnecessary. Duties were shifted to the more expansive Chehalis Post Office to offset the increasing postal demands in the community.

An overall renovation began in 1962 focused on such interior projects as painting, skylight upgrades, and new flooring and countertops. Exterior work included the repointing of the brick façade, new railings for the stairway, and replacement of the roof. A remodeling project in 1969 was geared towards interior painting and new ceiling tiles, as well as a replacement of the building's steam heating system.

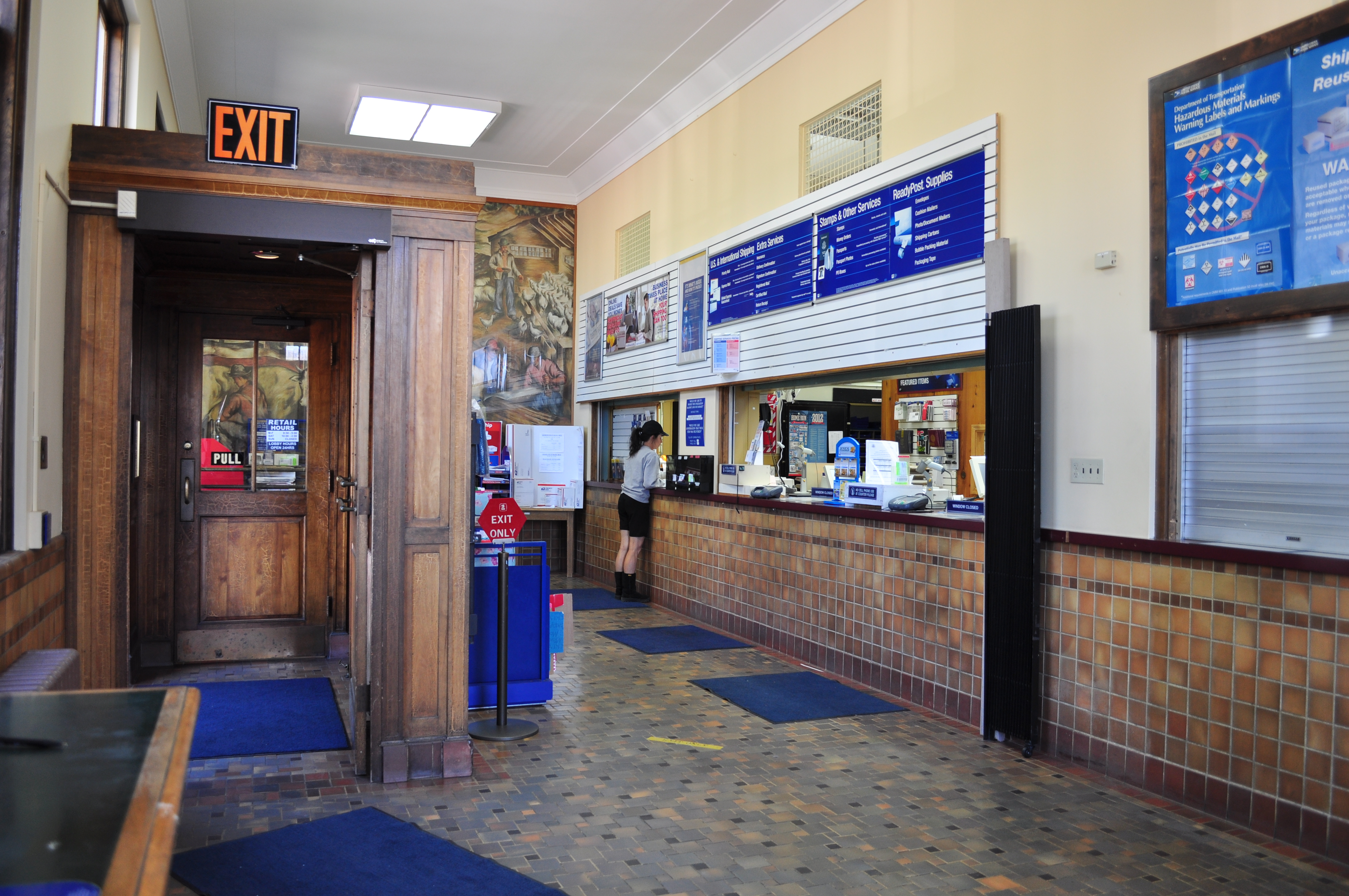
Interior, alternate view of lobby

Funding for a $125,000 renovation effort began in 1974. The work was necessary due to aging of the building, concerning enough that some consideration had been given to the build of a new post office at another location. However, the cost of construction reached estimates as high as $1 million and a remodel was thought more prudent, allowing the Centralia post office structure to remain for "at least the next 15 years". The interior, along with the basement, was remodeled. The parking lot was overhauled with a driveway and entrance for a drop box area and ten parking spaces were added. The work began in early 1975 and included an expanded roof deck over the loading dock and the installation of an elevator for use in mail handling by the staff. The cost was re-estimated at $100,000.

In October 2007, a renovation project was begun for a wheelchair ramp to the main entrance as well as the installation of automatic front doors. A new boiler was added, replacing one built in 1908, and the facility outfitted with modern air cooling and ventilation systems. The ramp, replacing a broken lift system, was built with matching brick to be analogous to the historic exterior of the post office. The efforts were hurried as federal postal laws required the postponement of remodeling work due to increased pressure on mail deliveries and efforts during the end of year holiday season.

== Artwork ==
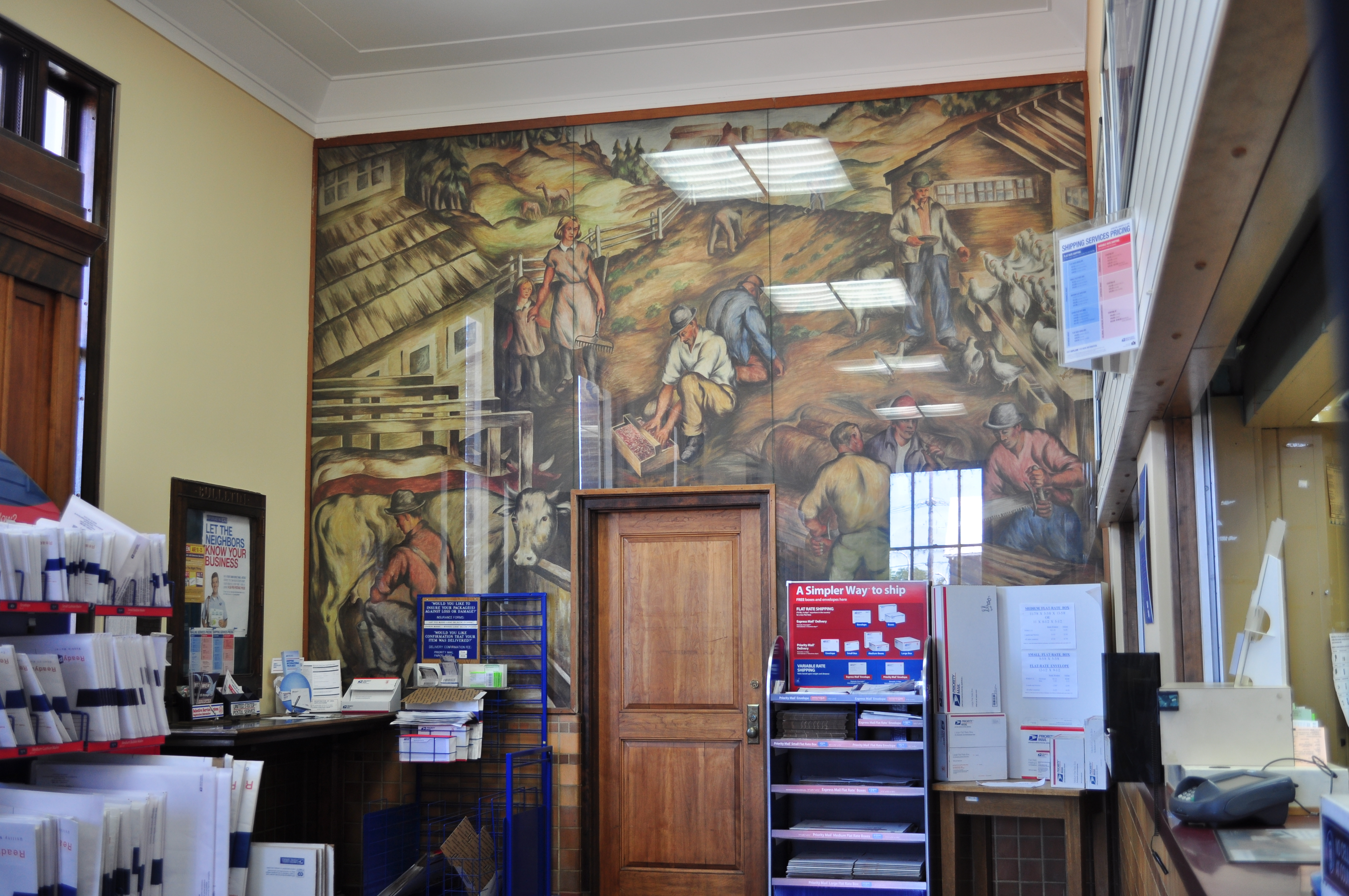
Industries of Lewis County mural

An original mural, Industries of Lewis County, is located on the east wall of the main lobby. The 12 ft × 6 ft (3.7 m × 1.8 m) artwork features scenes of various industries and daily life connected to Centralia during the 1930s, such as agriculture and timber production. The mural was created by Kenneth Callahan, a prominent artist in the state. The artwork was sponsored by the Federal Works Agency Section of Fine Arts, and the Centralia location was one of just 18 post offices in the nation to receive a mural under the program. Callahan retouched the mural in 1958, making no changes except repairing the artwork. Years of minor damage done by "thoughtless youths" since it was first installed mostly included scratching of initials.

== Significance ==
The Centralia Post Office was officially listed on the National Register of Historic Places and the Washington State Heritage Register on August 7, 1991. The NRHP nomination noted that the post office was of "good design integrity" that was often used in the western United States during the time. The connection and symbolism between the city's civic efforts, federal recognition of Centralia's geographic and economic importance, and the construction of the post office during the Great Depression were integral, determining factors towards the historic designation. Additionally, the Callahan mural was considered during the NRHP nomination for its connectivity to the New Deal art programs during the 1930s.

== See also ==
- List of United States post offices in Washington
- List of United States post office murals in Washington
