= List of United States post office murals in Washington =

Following is a list of United States post office murals created in Washington between 1934 and 1943.

Location	Mural title	Image	Artist	Date	Notes	NRHP-listed
Anacortes	Halibut Fishing		Kenneth Callahan	1940	oil on canvas	
Bremerton	Northwest Logging		Ernest Ralph Norling	1938	oil on canvas	
Camas	Beginning of a New World		Douglas Nicholson	1941	tempera	
Centralia Post Office, Centralia	Industries of Lewis County		Kenneth Callahan	1938	oil on canvas	
Colville	Hudson's Bay-The Pathfinders		Edmond J. Fitzgerald	1939	oil on canvas	
Kelso	Incidents in the Lives of Lewis and Clark		David McCosh	1938	oil on canvas	
Lynden	Three Ages of Phoebe Goodell Judson		Mordi Gassner	1942	oil on canvas	
Mount Vernon	Local Pursuits		Ambrose McCarthy	1938	oil on canvas	
Prosser	Mail Train in the '80s		Ernest Ralph Norling	1937	oil on canvas	
Renton	Miners at Work		Jacob Elshin	1937	oil on canvas	
University Station, Seattle	Historical View of Education		Jacob Elshin	1939	oil on canvas	
Sedro-Woolley	Loggers and Millworkers		Albert C. Runquist	1941	oil on canvas	
Shelton	Skid Road		Richard Haines	1940	tempera; winner of the 48-State Mural Competition	
Snohomish	Construction of a Skid Road in the '80s		Lance W. Hart	1940	oil on canvas	
Toppenish	Local Theme		Andrew McD. Vincent	1940	oil on canvas; the Toppenish post office is located entirely within the Yakama Indian Nation	1991
Wenatchee	The Saga of Wanatchee		Peggy Strong	1940	oil on canvas	
