= United States Post Office (Port Angeles, Washington) =

- U.S. Post Office
- U.S. National Register of Historic Places
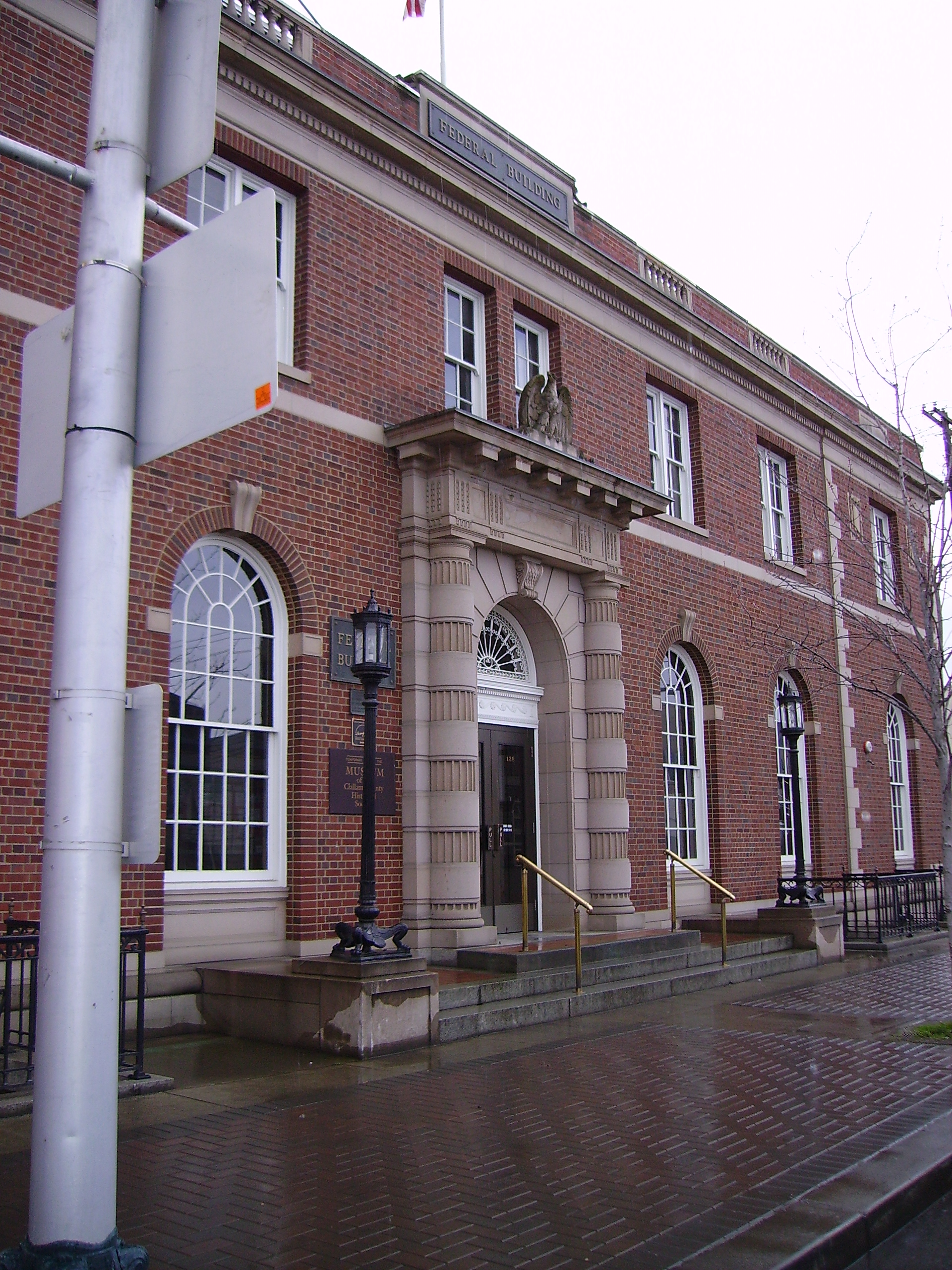
- The old Port Angeles Post Office

- Location within Washington (state) Location within the United States
- Location: 138 West 1st Street, Port Angeles, Washington
- Coordinates: 48°07′10″N 123°26′07″W
- Area: 0.34 acres (0.14 ha)
- Built: 1931
- Architect: J.A. Wetmore
- Architectural style: Georgian, Federal
- NRHP reference No.: 83003321
- Added to NRHP: September 1, 1983

The U.S Post Office, also known as the Federal Building and the Old Post Office, is a historic building located at 138 West 1st Street in Port Angeles, Washington which was built in 1931–1933.

A Post Office had been established in Port Angeles since 1860, but had no permanent home and moved several times. The land for the Post Office and Federal building was originally occupied by a squatter for whom the city raised funds to build a new house at a different location. The cost of the building was $124,807. In 1978 the growing community of Port Angeles constructed a new post office in which all mail operation were moved.

The building was added to the National Register of Historic Places in 1983.
