= Chehalis Post Office =

NRHP-listed site in Chehalis, Washington

- U.S. National Register of Historic Places
- Washington State Heritage Register
- Chehalis Historic Preservation Commission
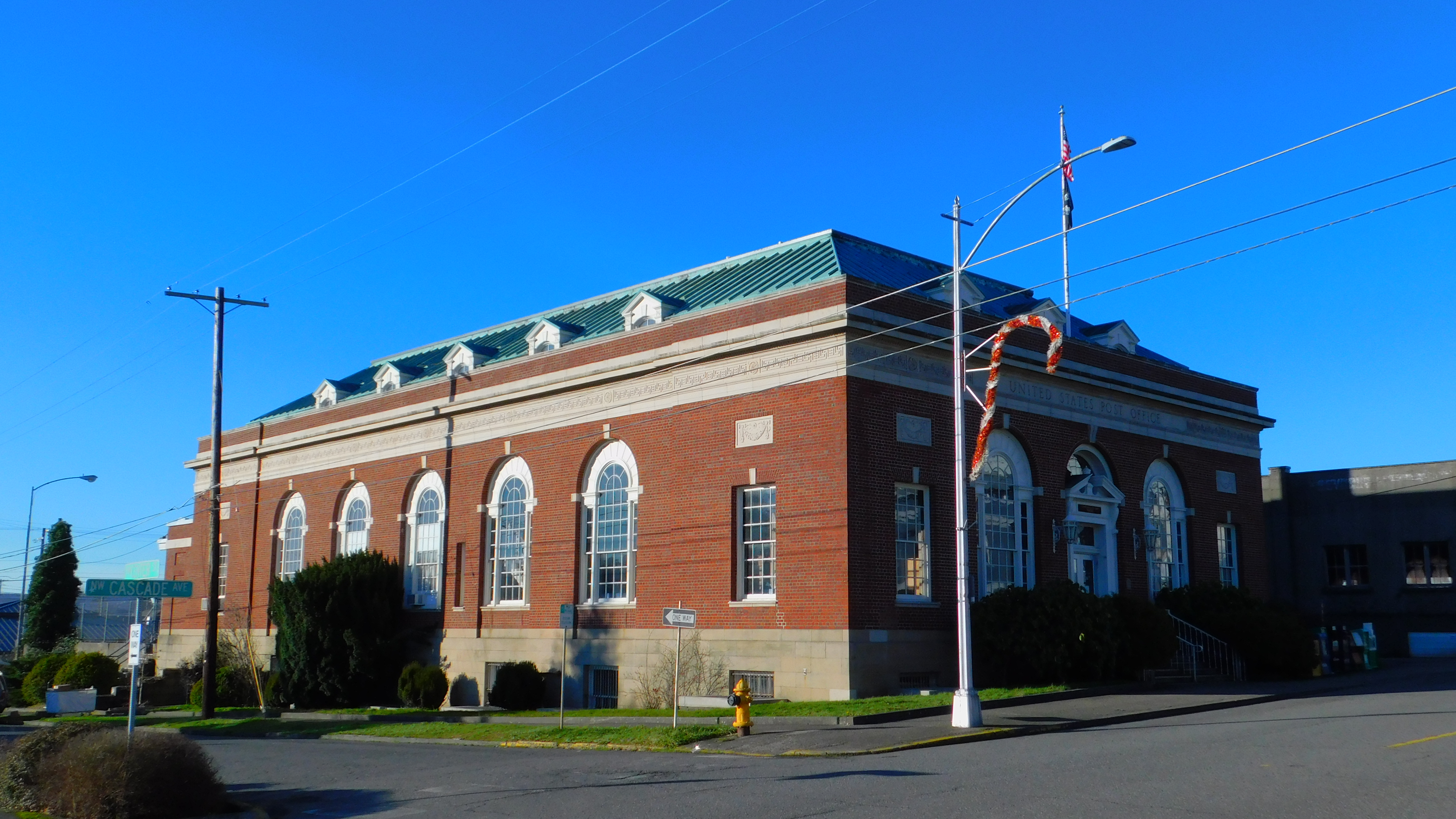
- The NRHP post office in Chehalis, Washington

- Location within Washington (state)
- Location: 1031 NW Cascade Avenue, Chehalis, Washington
- Coordinates: 46°39′47″N 122°57′59″W
- Area: 0.5 acres (0.20 ha)
- Built: 1934
- Architect: James A. Wetmore
- Architectural style: Colonial Revival, Georgian Revival
- Website: Chehalis Post Office
- MPS: Historic US Post Offices in Washington MPS
- NRHP reference No.: 91000641

Significant dates
- Added to NRHP: May 30, 1991
- Designated WSHR: August 31, 1984
- Designated CHPC: 1993

The Chehalis Post Office is a federal post office in Chehalis, Washington. The Georgian Revival building has been listed on the National Register of Historic Places (NRHP) since 1991. The site has been declared a historic building by the Chehalis Historic Preservation Commission.

The post office is the only federal building in the city and was completed and dedicated in 1934. The Chehalis MPO, as it is listed in the NRHP form, was the last post office constructed in Chehalis. The build ended a stretch of perhaps nine different postal locations in the community. The first office was established in 1858 at the homestead of Schuyler and Elizabeth Saunders, the founding family of what later became Chehalis.

The brick building was constructed for $97,400 during the Great Depression by the Works Progress Administration. Two stories tall, the structure was one of the last federal Beaux-Arts-style buildings erected and an example of 1930s architecture used by the United States government. The exterior contains several features of note, including numerous semi-circular windows, dormers, a front pediment entrance, as well as various terra cotta designs and motifs. Materials, which included sandstone, were mostly procured in the Pacific Northwest.

The interior was built with modern amenities of the time and many features, including flooring and millwork, remain in the present day. The first floor hosts the post office's public duties, and the building contains a basement, mezzanine, and a second floor used for office space. Outside of natural upgrades and maintenance, the Chehalis Post Office is considered to remain in a mostly unaltered state.

Located in between two other NRHP-listed sites, the Chehalis Downtown Historic District and the Lewis County Courthouse, the post office serves as a central hub for local mail deliveries and rural routes expanding across Lewis County. The Chehalis Post Office reached first class status in 1937 and mail service has operated continuously in the city since September 1870.

== History ==
=== Early post offices ===
The first post office in Chehalis was established in the log home of the city's founding family, Schuyler and Elizabeth Saunders, on May 8, 1858 (Note: Reports of the establishment date of the Saundersville post office vary by a day or two, often as May 6) and was located on Main Street. The town was known as Saundersville at the time, credited after Schuyler, although Elizabeth was recognized as the first postmaster in the community that came to be known as Chehalis. The post office, having moved to the corner of Chehalis Avenue and North Street during its brief existence, was discontinued on December 7, 1859. A new post office, located at the Madsen corner, was renewed on January 10, 1861, lasting until September 29, 1865, when the postmasters left Chehalis to begin a district on the Klickitat prairie. (Note: Other recollections of the 1861 post office report that it may have shuttered in December, rather than September, of 1865.)

The town's post office was reestablished on August 7, 1867, under postmaster Mary M. McFadden, wife of pioneer, Obadiah B. McFadden. Mary oversaw operations in their home, the O. B. McFadden House, also an NRHP-listed site and the oldest residence in the city. Discontinued again on January 31, 1870, Obadiah became the new postmaster when he restarted the office later in the year on September 23; the Chehalis post office system has been in continuous, uninterrupted service since.

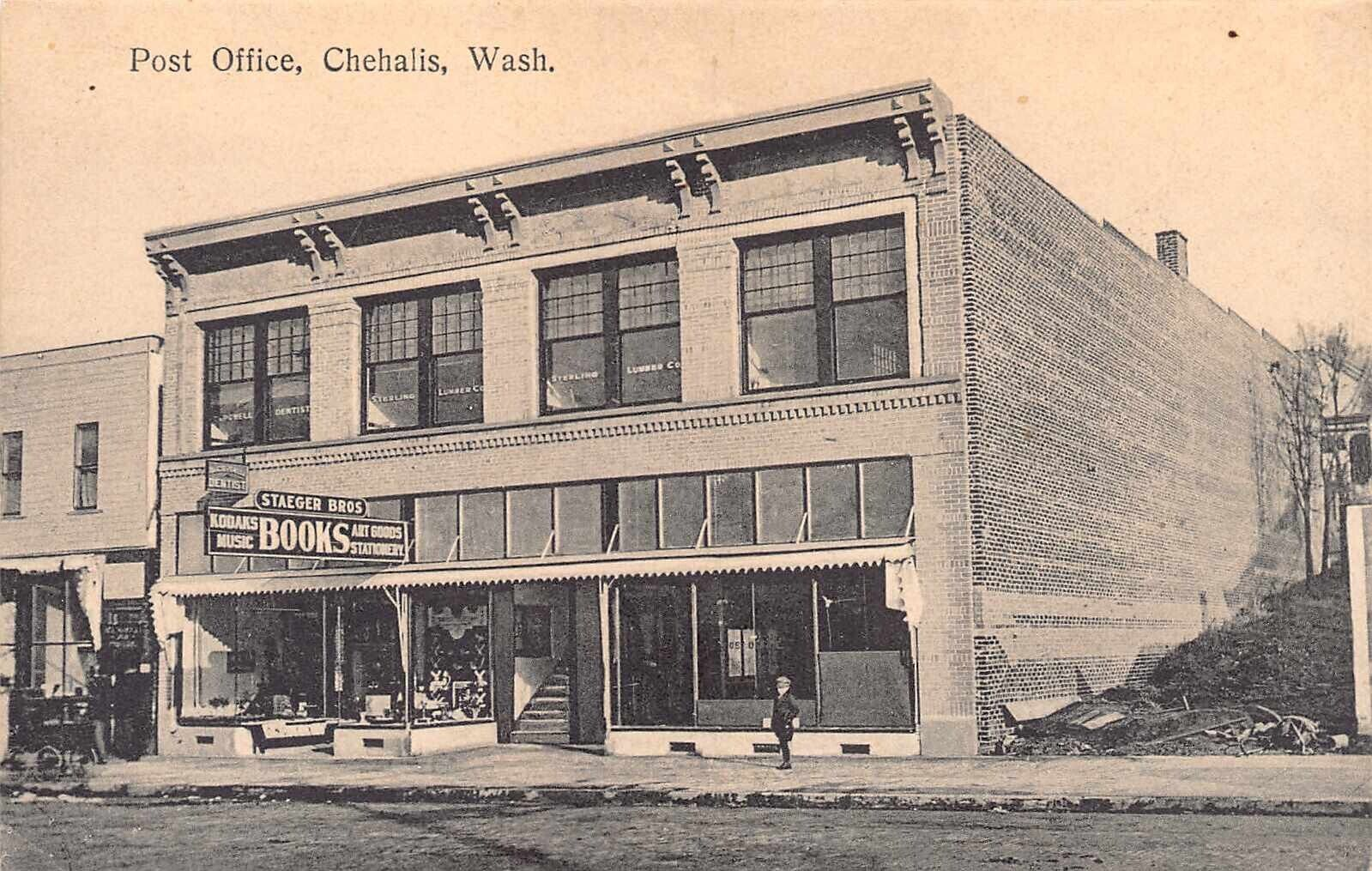
Chehalis Post Office, early 20th century

Officially known as Saunders Prairie at the time, McFadden changed the community's name to Chehalis where it was officially adopted by residents on January 5, 1874, and recognized by the state legislature on November 5, 1879. (Note: Dates on the official name change from Saundersville to Chehalis vary wildly in sourcing, ranging from 1870 to 1879. See various references within the article.) The reopened post office was a block west of the present-day Lewis County Courthouse. The first official "Chehalis" postmaster was Civil War veteran, Captain John T. Newland. The new office was moved in November 1875 to a store owned by George Hogue at the intersection of Prindle and State streets. In a January 1893 announcement, the Chehalis post office was designated as an international money order post office, able to offer and transact international money orders under the Universal Postal Union.

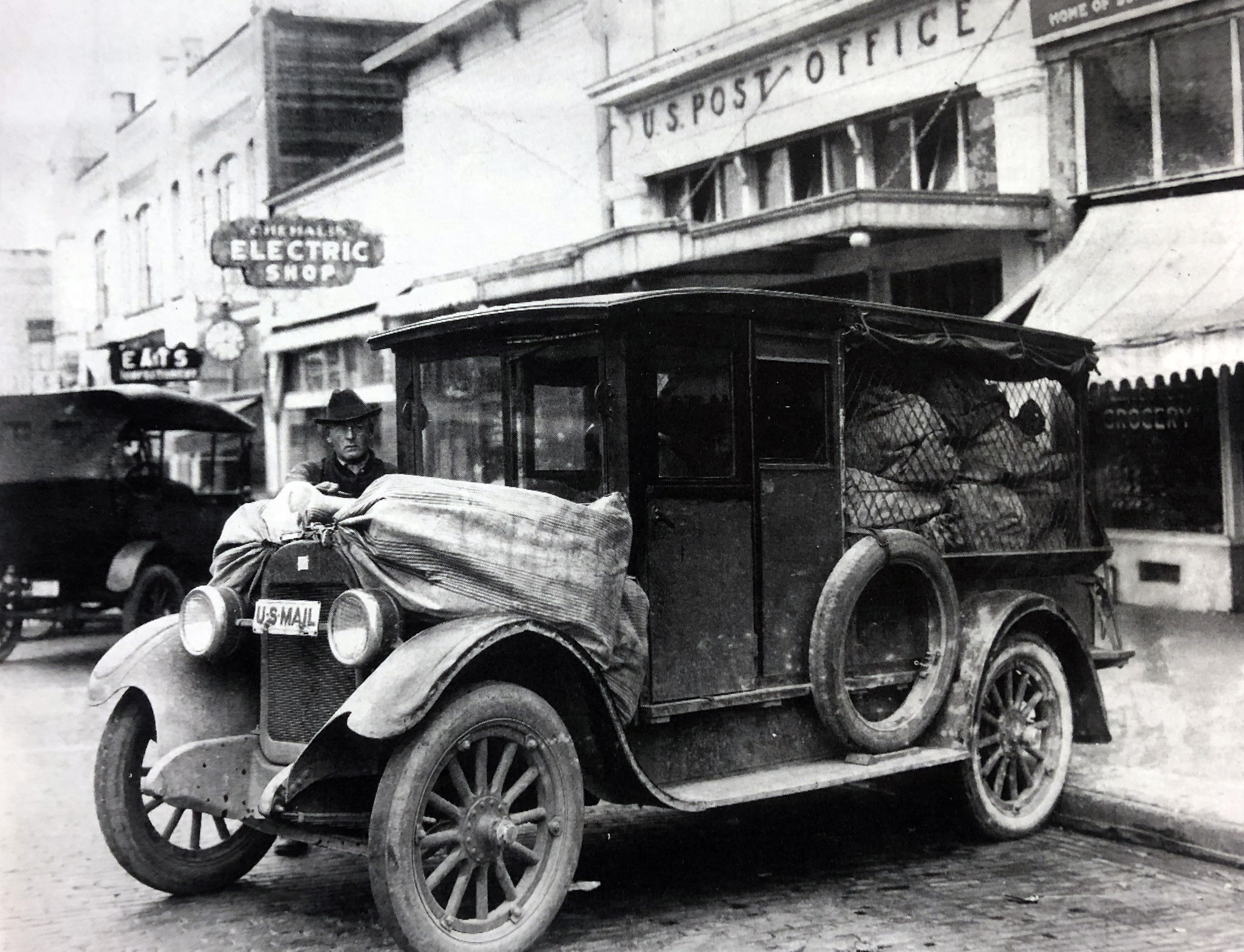
Chehalis Post Office, Market Street, 1910s to 1920s

Under the era of Postmaster Dan W. Bush, the post office was relocated officially in September 1908 to a building on Market Street owned by the Bush brothers; the post office signed a 10-year lease. The move to a larger building was necessitated by the postal demands, and subsequent increases in mail route activity, of the growing city. In October 1917, Chehalis was made the postal center in Lewis County where 48 other post offices, excluding Centralia, requested supplies and delivered monthly postal reports.

The post office moved once again in late-November 1919 to a more modern space also located in another Bush brothers-owned building. The following May, the office received their first electric stamping machine, a significant upgrade at the time.

The post office relocated a final time in December 1929 to a slightly smaller space in the Zopolos Block in the northern section of downtown. Signed to a 10-year lease, the rental agreement agreed to dissolve once the new federal post office building was completed.

=== Chehalis Post Office ===
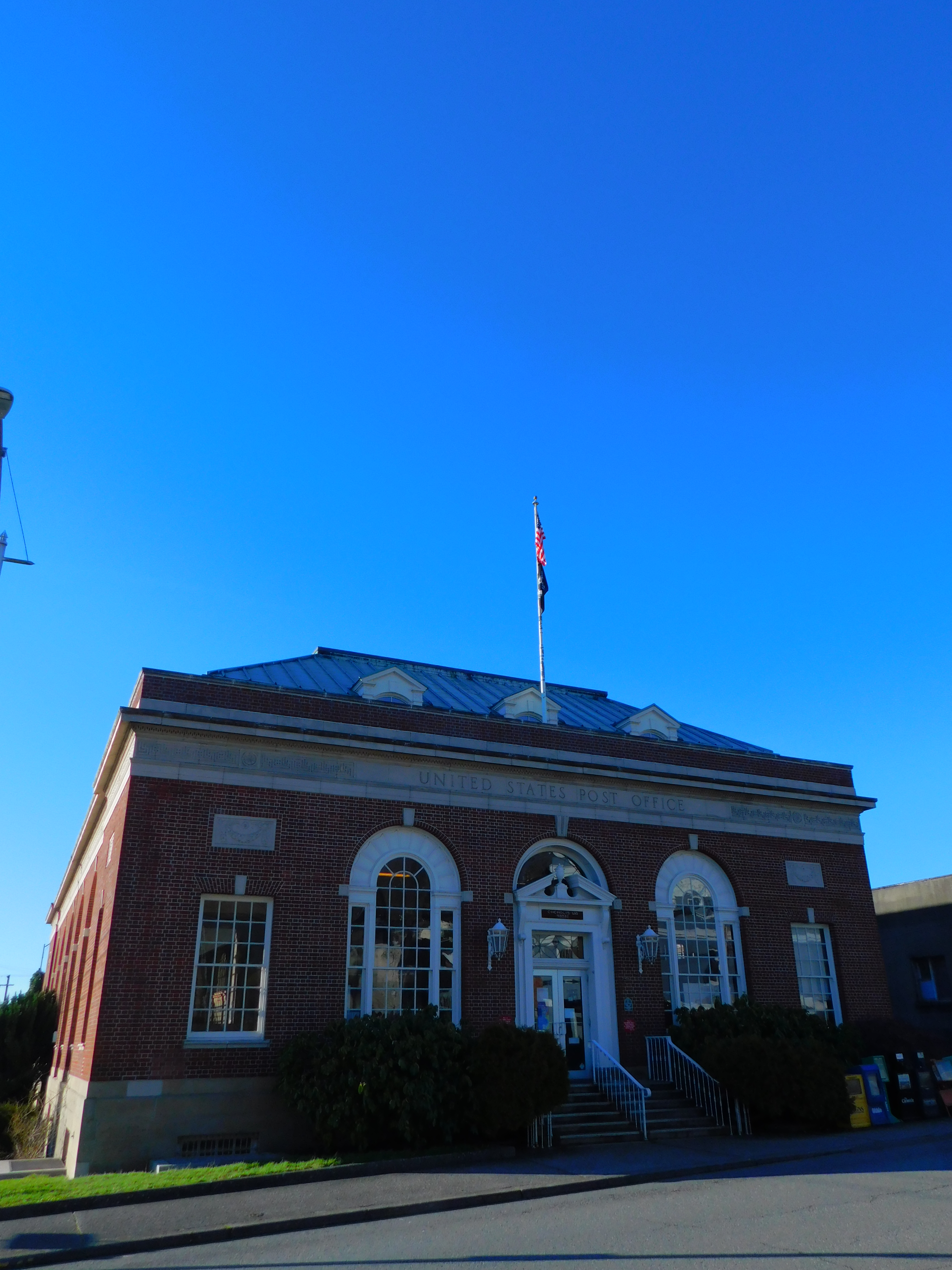
Main entrance, 2022

The beginnings of a federal Chehalis Post Office, also known via the National Register of Historic Places (NRHP) listing as the Chehalis MPO, was initiated by request from Washington state congressman, William Wallace McCredie, during the deliberations of the Act of June 25, 1910, a federal public buildings initiative. Funding of $95,000 was issued by the United States House of Representatives in February 1929 and finally granted at $150,000 in late-February 1931. The large appropriation for a small city, such as Chehalis at the time, was due to existing agreements during the several long-term attempts of a nationwide federal post office construction project. Previous pacts included a large postal facility footprint and a growing need to help offset unemployment in the community due to the Great Depression.

The location, at the intersection of Cascade Avenue and Center Street, and the architectural Colonial style, were announced as finalized by October 1932; the original plans were for the building to be one-story with an attic. The building was designed by James A. Wetmore and construction was undertaken by the Works Progress Administration. The finished cost of the project was reported as $97,400, approximately $100 under budget. The courthouse was dedicated on January 10, 1934. The event subsequently honored the 60th anniversary of the city's official 1874 Chehalis post office and postal employees from Centralia were invited.

Based on the Adjusted Compensation Payment Act, the Chehalis MPO was certified as a headquarters in June 1936 to handle the distribution of funds from veterans wishing to surrender their World War I bonus bonds.

Parking access to the post office was considered to have the most problematic parking of federal postal facilities between Portland and Seattle. A 5-minute parking strip was enlarged in 1952 allowing more time and space for mail trucks, which usually delivered mail via the front door due to difficulties in entering the rear loading dock. A plan to widen Cascade Avenue to provide better parking and access to the post office was withdrawn in September 1953 after local neighborhood opposition.

Chehalis received the zip code of 98532 in an announcement in June 1963 during the beginning rollout of the ZIP Code system. The post office during the 1960s was once home to a local IRS tax office that was opened to the public during tax season.

== Postal services history ==
=== Awards ===
The Chehalis MPO was given an Award of Merit by the United States Postal Service in 1970 in recognition for several ideas the Chehalis staff suggested for postal delivery improvements. Five ideas were implemented within the region, and one, protecting mail carrier bags with plastic covers, was adopted on a national level.

=== Class ===
The early post offices were listed as fourth class stations, advancing to third in June 1890. Second class qualifications were met in July 1906 and the post office briefly achieved first class in 1926, an unusual graduation for a small city post office. The first class designation was brief, ending in July 1933 due to deteriorating conditions of the Great Depression that caused a drop in revenue and therefore a reduction to second class. First class status was reestablished in 1937.

=== Delivery ===
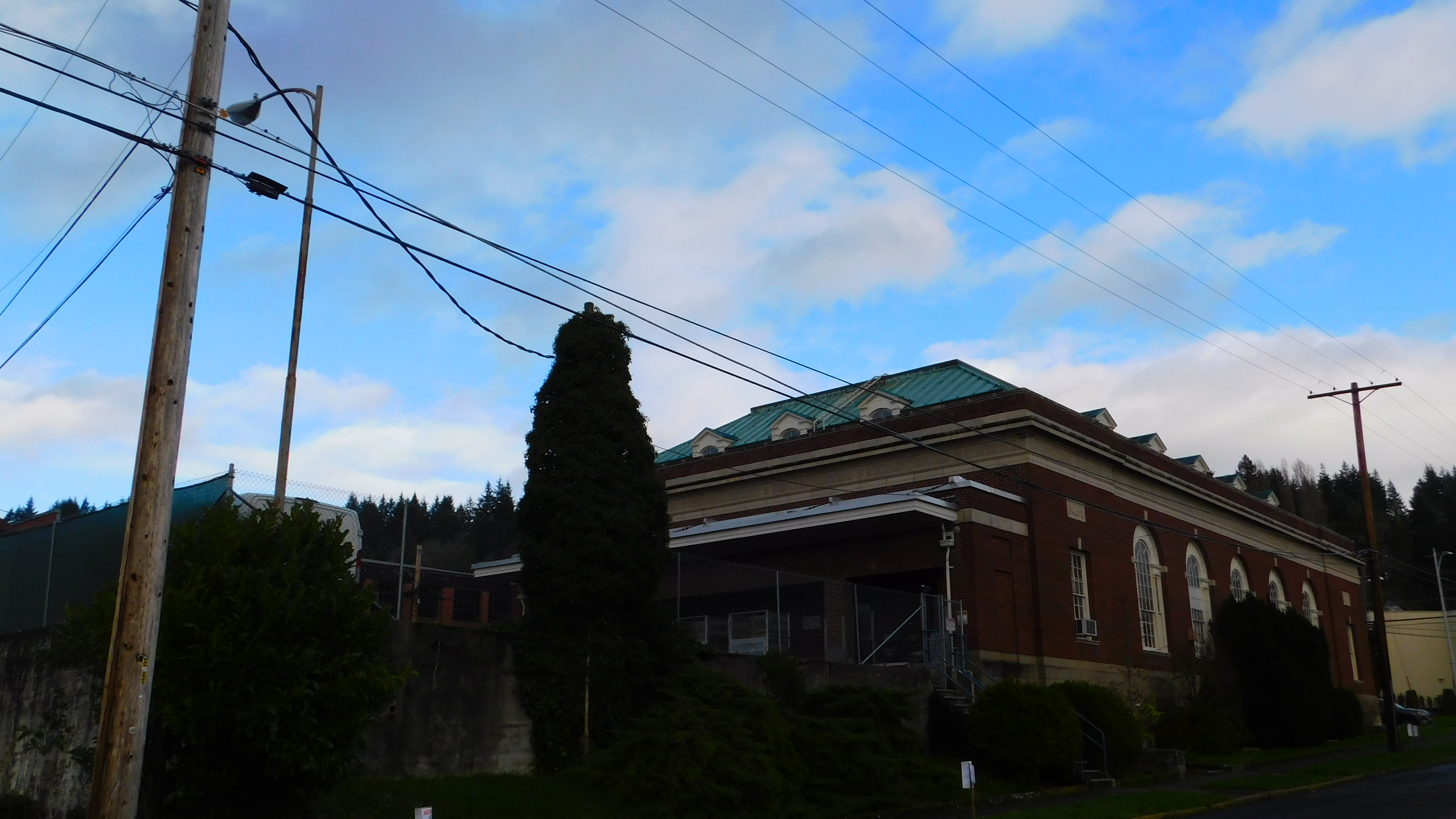
Rear, loading dock, 2025

Early mail delivery was often done on horseback, such as on the route from Chehalis to Randle which was handled by a Native American known as "Henry", or via buggy; pushcarts were used in the city. Mail carriers were not certified under a civil service entrance examination until 1909 and a postman could expect wages of 30 cents per hour. Official mail delivery within the city was not established until June 1909 though a rural route existed by 1905. Two additional carrier routes were added in 1913 and 1922, with a Rural Route No. 4 in 1922. A fifth route, made possible by road improvements in the county, was created in September 1924 and 3,822 people were record in 1925 as being served by the system. At the time of the dedication, Chehalis was part of a star route, connecting mail deliveries from Eastern Lewis County to South Bend, Washington, and had a postal district encompassing 1,725 square miles (4,470 km^{2}).

The Chehalis post office was used temporarily as the regional mail center beginning at the end of December 1961 after the post office in Centralia, which handled sorting duties, lost funding to modernize its location. With extra space in Chehalis, the efforts produced no delays or interruptions in service. The post office continued to have five rural routes in the mid-1960s, listing over 1,600 families on the lines. As part of a federal employee cutback during 1968, Saturday postal deposit box pickups were reduced to once a day and pauses were temporarily implemented on the creation of new routes or deliveries to newer residential areas.

Mail trucks were first used to deliver letters and parcels within the city, as well as rural routes emanating from Chehalis, in February 1973.

By 2006, the Chehalis MPO reported a daily handling between 35,000 and 40,000 pieces of mail by an operation of 34 employees.

=== Notable events and incidents ===
A robbery of approximately $1,000 took place in 1895 at the Chehalis MPO. A special agent investigated Centralia postmaster John Laraway about the crime; Laraway was described during the time as lacking "good standing" with the federal post office department.

Post office boxes at Centralia and Chehalis were broken into by a trio of young teenagers in January 1923. The robberies took place over two or three days and the group stashed mail throughout Centralia, at times leaving a trail of dropped letters. A check for $13,000 was taken from Chehalis. When asked how they broke into the boxes that contained combination locks, one perpetrator stated, "That's easy."

A viral phenomenon starting from a social media post in October 2020, led to the post office receiving hundreds of pieces of mail from across the nation for Jimmy Armfield. Armfield, who often waited at the post office multiple times per day to check his post office box, also received packages and international deliveries for several days; his favorite items were photos sent from a family member.

=== Postmarks and stamps ===
A pictorial cancellation stamp to celebrate the 100th anniversary of Washington state in 1989 was made available at the Chehalis Post Office. In early 1997, the Chehalis Post Office's official cancellation was no longer made available unless residents delivered their outgoing mail, or requested a stamp on already cancelled posts, in person. A recent change that year, sending mail to be sorted in Olympia where the machinery was faster, led to the loss of the cancellation stamp.

A special cancellation, in association with the dedication of Oregon Trail markers in Chehalis and Claquato, were made available in 2006. The Chehalis stamp included a likeness of a Conestoga wagon; the Adna post office offered a similar stamp during the event that featured the Claquato Church.

The post office issued a pictorial cancellation to commemorate the 100th anniversary of the city's Lewis County Historical Society and Museum, previously the Burlington Northern Depot, in June 2012. The museum offered two special envelopes that could be stamped during the celebration, one featuring the McKinley Stump and another with a railroad logo. A similar postmark was offered by the Centralia Union Depot the month prior.

=== Postmasters ===
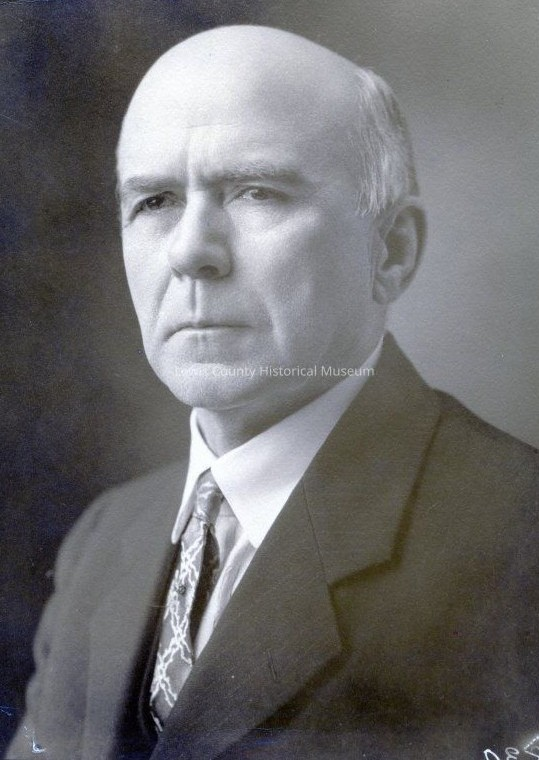
Dan Bush, postmaster, c. 1920s

Postmasters of the Chehalis post office since the oversight days of the Saunders family, McFaddens, and Captain Newland include a brief management run by Timothy Winston in 1861, with Evert Geiger (1875), Henry Miles (1876), and James Berry (1879) undertaking the task at times during the 1870s. Three members of the Urquhart family were successive postmasters, with John undertaking the task in September 1879, William in 1880, and Annie becoming the head of office in 1883. John Willis (1886) and William Mossman (1889) closed out the heavy turnover of the early days of the post office. Stability was established in the 1890s with management undertaken by C.E. Lillpop in 1894, handing off to a long-term postmaster reign by Dan W. Bush on November 1, 1898. (Note: In 1890, a Washington state representative was reported as nominating a W.H. Morgan for appointment to the postmaster position but no other sourcing mentions a postmaster under this name. It is possible that it was an error in an attempt to mention William H. Mossman, who began serving in 1889.)

The position remained in Bush's control until handed over to Elmer McBroom, owner of the Chehalis Advocate newspaper, on March 21, 1915; McBroom was succeeded by Judd C. Bush on October 1, 1923. In 1926, the postmaster title went to J.R. Imus, who was at the helm when the NRHP-listed Chehalis Post Office was constructed and dedicated. Lloyd Sullivan was postmaster from May 1935 until his death in September 1953 after being struck by a truck in the downtown district.

The post office had no acting postmaster until January 31, 1954, when John Nowadnick began serving as an interim head of the department. Nowadnick became the official postmaster in January 1955 but was not made permanent until October 1957 after pressure from the Eisenhower administration beginning in 1956. After Nowadnick's sudden retirement at the end of September 1964, Clifford Brock, previously the city's state-licensed liquor store owner, became acting postmaster. He was officially appointed during the Lyndon B. Johnson administration in June 1966.

After Brock, postmasters included Ronald Gates, H. Coleman Dokken, who retired in 1992, and Roxanne Vanderberg, who became postmaster on December 31, 1996. Frank DeRemer held the position beginning in 2003 followed by Jade Nevitt. As of 2024, the Chehalis MPO postmaster is Melissa Huffman.

=== Receipts ===
One of the earliest reports on postal receipts for Chehalis lists $3,628 in 1896, followed with a slight increase the next year to $3,787. Receipt reports in the 1900s saw steady increases, from $5,260 in 1902, to over $6,300 the next year, and heading over $7,000 in 1904. The post office recorded its first year above $10,000 in 1907. In just five years, in part due to a new nationwide parcel post system, the Chehalis post office registered over $20,000 in 1912. By 1922, it surpassed $30,000, the increase suggested due to a large home ownership population in the city that "naturally write more letters". The economic growth did not last, with a temporary decrease in revenue three months later forcing the curtailing of working hours and a decrease in delivery times. The setback was minor, with receipts exceeding over $34,000 and $35,000 respectively over the next two years.

When the Chehalis postal system broke $40,000 in 1925, it graduated to first class the following year, a distinction at the time usually reserved for post offices in larger cities. The increased workload created the need for a substation, which was opened in late-1927 at the Chehalis Grocery on Market Street.

The post office, between 1925 and the advent of the Great Depression, regularly achieved over $40,000 in postal receipts but fell below the mark during the difficult financial climate. The Chehalis MPO did not exceed the mark until 1935. The post office's first class status was restored in 1937 after achieving a record of over $45,000 in revenue the prior year.

By the mid-1960s, revenue was reported as around $500,000 annually, generated by shipping charges, sales of stamps, and various banking and money order transactions.

== Geography ==
The post office is situated at the intersection of Cascade Avenue and Center Street on a triangular block between the Chehalis Downtown Historic District and the government district, which includes the Lewis County Courthouse. It is located two blocks from the city hall and the Vernetta Smith Timberland Library and is surrounded by a mix of single-family homes and commercial property. Two churches are nearby, including the Church of the Apostolic Faith, dedicated in February 1954 and situated across the main entrance on Cascade.

== Architecture and features ==
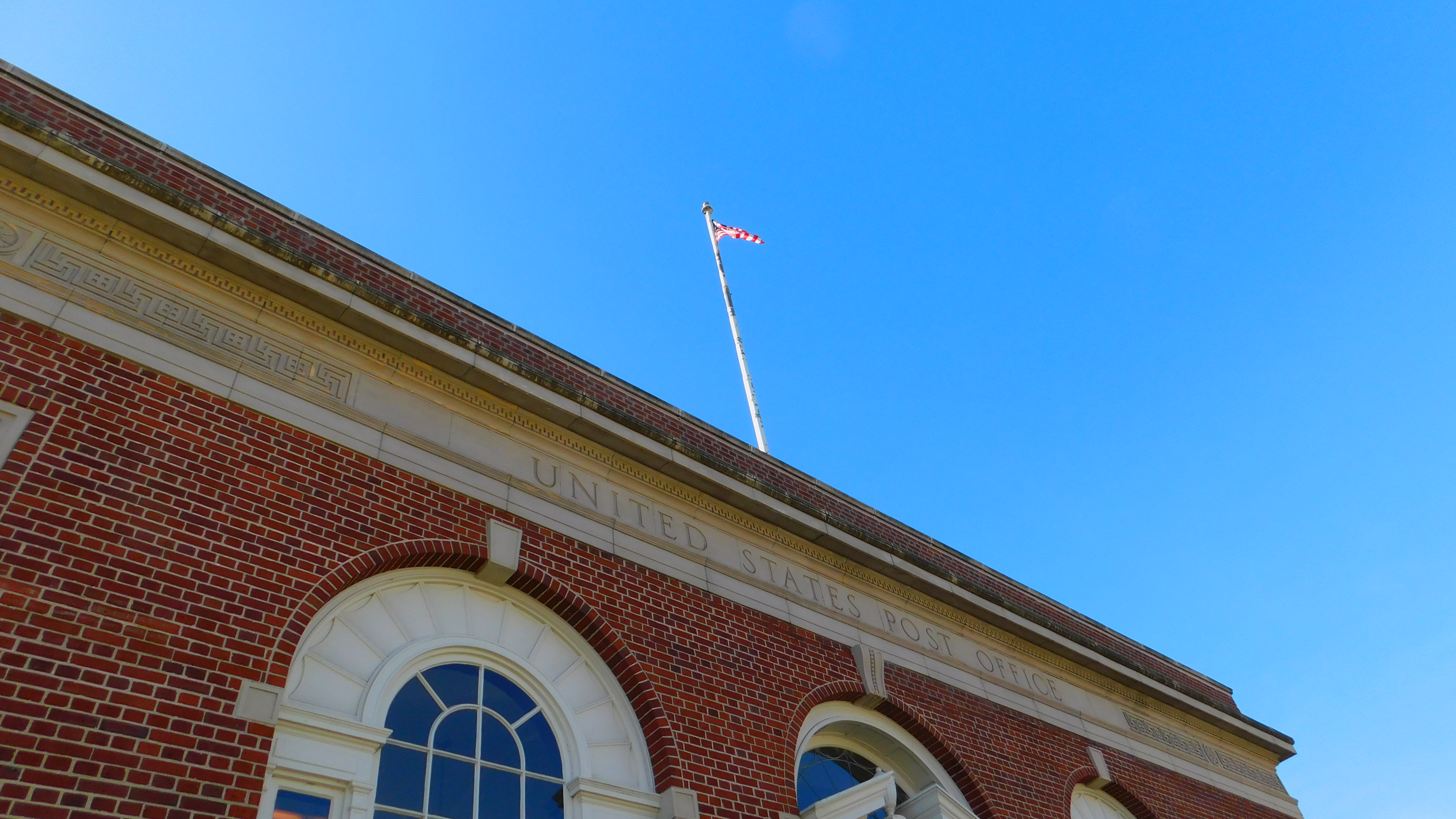
Exterior details, above main entrance, 2019

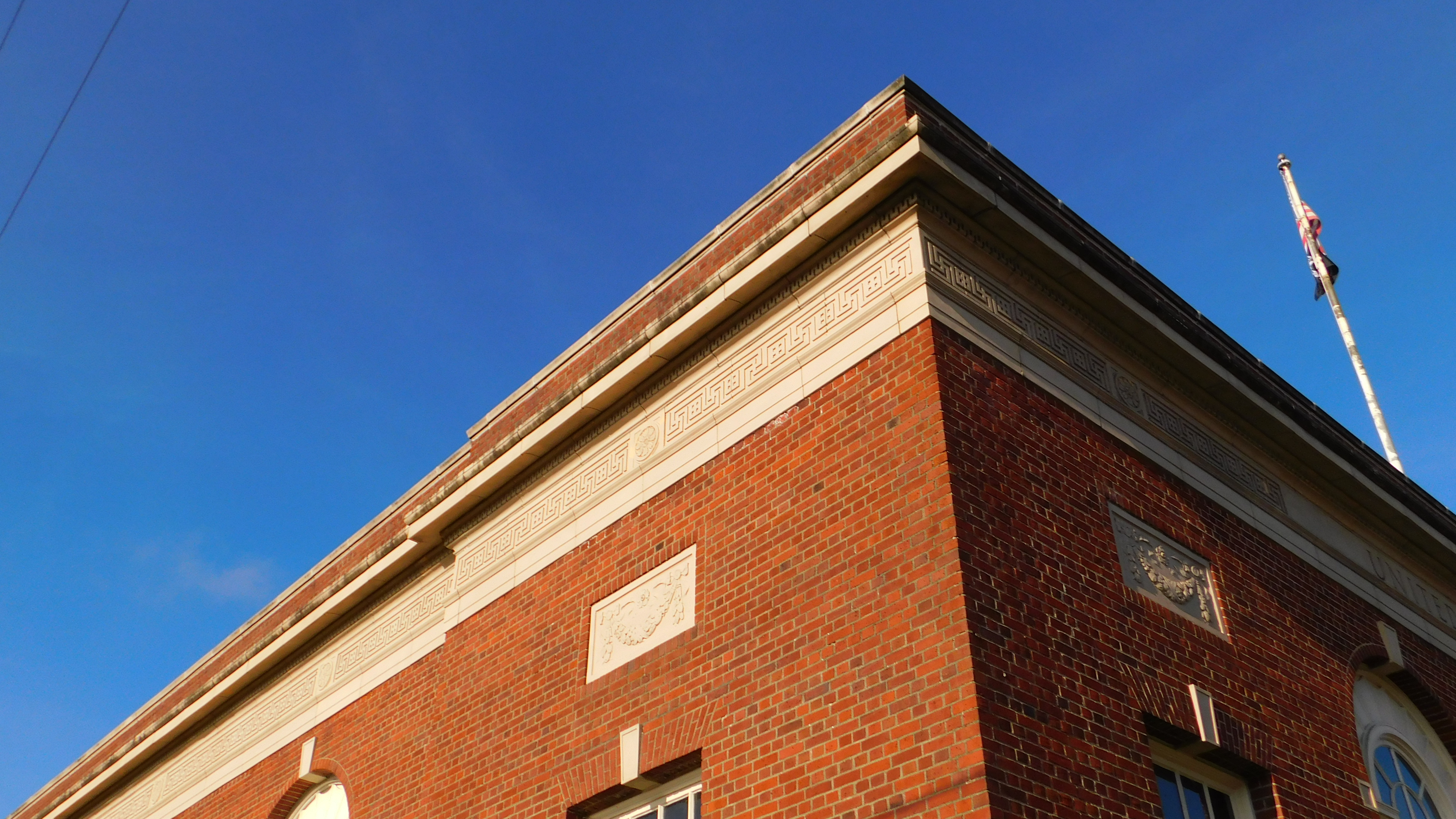
Exterior details, southeast corner, 2024

Unless otherwise noted, the details provided are based on the 1991 National Register of Historic Places (NRHP) nomination form and may not reflect updates or changes to the Chehalis Post Office in the interim.

The Chehalis Post Office is a 62 ft × 113.5 ft (18.9 m × 34.6 m) (Note: Reports immediately after the dedication list slightly different calculations, referring to frontage measurements of 63 ft × 124 ft (19 m × 38 m).) two-story red brick building constructed on a raised basement. The symmetrical architectural style is considered Georgian Revival and was designed at the end of the Beaux-Arts period. The Chehalis MPO was one of the last such builds of this type before a concentration on constructing automated facilities. The building is an example of classically-designed architecture under the United States government during the 1930s. Exterior features include a centered architrave entry that is flanked by Palladian, and semi-circular windows. Most details are terra cotta and include bas relief garlands situated in rectangular panels over the flat arched corner casements. The frieze contains projecting cornices and the entablature is molded terra cotta. A low brick parapet caps the exterior walls and the copper hipped roof contains multiple dormers.

Construction materials were supplied either locally or within the Pacific Northwest region, with brick coming from the city, terra cotta from Spokane, and stone quarried in Boise, Idaho. Marble was supplied from the state of Vermont.

The structure is supported by concrete foundations and steel beams, with a mostly brick exterior done in English bond; the interior is walled in terra cotta blocks. Additional exterior details, such as the cladding of the exposed basement walls, coping, and window sills are sandstone; granite is used for the stairs and landings. Windows are noted for a variety of details such prominent keystones, detailed scrollwork, and square springers.

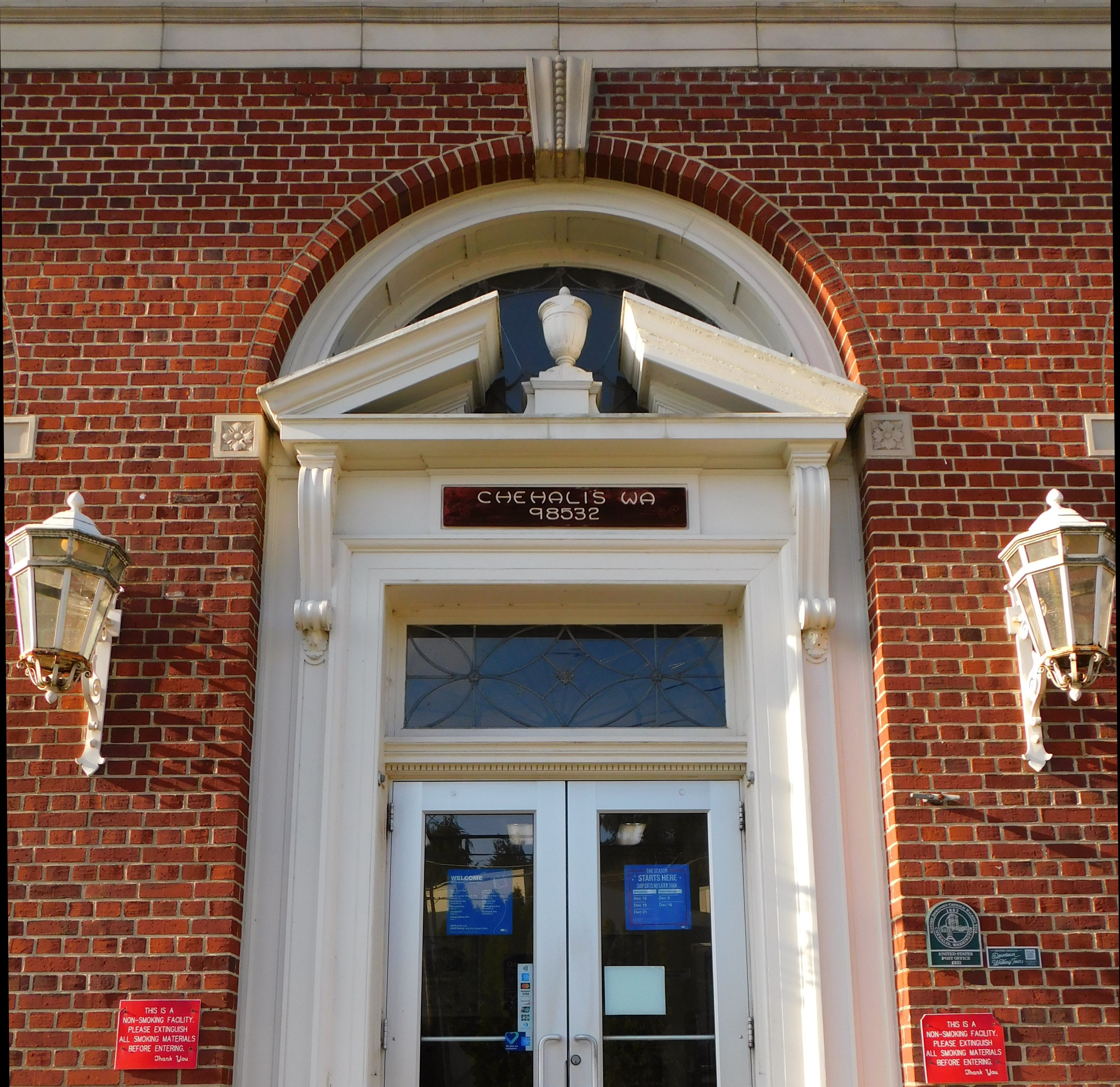
Main entrance, Chehalis Post Office, 2024

The entryway style is considered a broken pediment with bracket supports. A lead glass web motif and cast iron lanterns light the arch and the pediment which is adorned with a transom window, detailed in a curvilinear diamond pattern. Hardware was solid bronze.

The curved-arch glass windows are immediately next to the entry contain a 6-panel fan-shaped layout under the arches, which are pilaster supported with glass paneled sections. The double-hung windows are paneled as 16-over-12. Flat-arched windows are voussoir brick with keystones and are also double hung, 12-over-12.

The façade is capped by a slightly projecting cornice and entablature, with a frieze inscribed with "United States Post Office" and detailed with fretwork. Opposite sides mirror each other, maintaining a symmetrical appearance. The front and back of the post office contain 3 dormers while there are 5 such roof windows on the sides. The only noticeable lack of symmetry is on the back of the building. The area, used for shipping and receiving of the mail, contains a roof-covered platform that expands the width of the exterior.

=== Interior ===
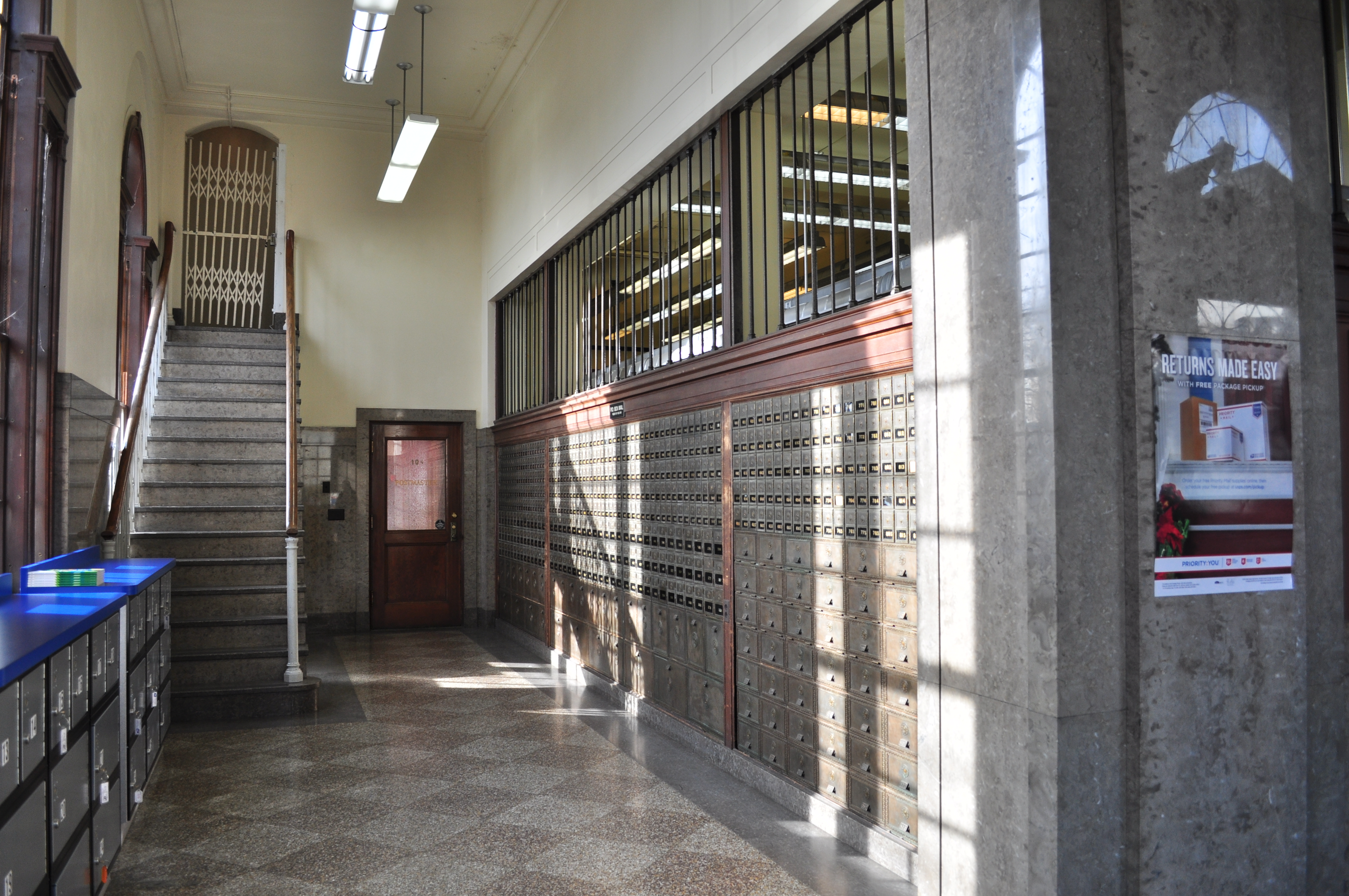
Interior of the post office

The Chehalis Post Office, after construction was completed, contained modern amenities of the time. Mechanical works included a coal-powered heat system, a smokeless boiler, water coolers on each floor, brass pipes, bronze-plated hardware, and Kohler Co. plumbing fixtures. The basement was a storage room for coal and contained an employee lounge room outfitted with a shower and toilet bathroom.

The first floor, as it remains in the present day, is the main post office floor. Details included wrought iron grillwork at the counters and mailboxes, woodblock floors, rubbed finishes on hardware, and was decorated with fir woodwork. The postmaster's office contained quarter sawn oak details. Terrazzo, containing marble chips from quarries in the state, was used in other areas with brass strips placed in between floors to highlight changes in colors. Walls were built of either glazed brick from the Chehalis Brick & Tile Company or marble from Tennessee, also used in the interior's borders. The area contained a mezzanine and a small office to store older postal records.

Mostly used for office space, the second floor contained similar woodwork and flooring, and each of the 11 offices contained a bathroom. The walls included picture rail and chair rail touches.

== Renovations and restorations ==
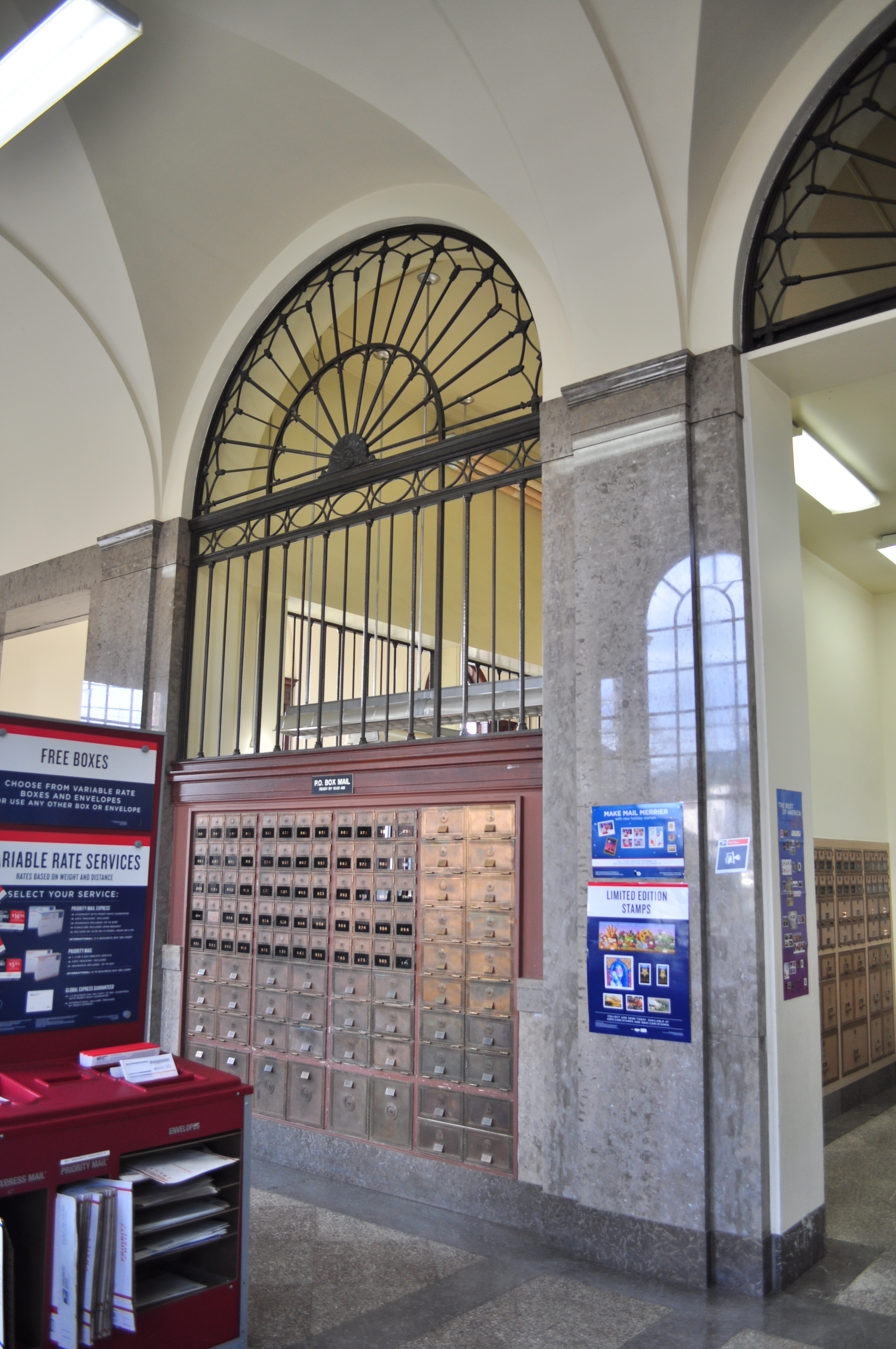
Post office boxes

The first noted repair and improvement project was in 1961 where exterior doors, including the front entrance, were replaced. Additional efforts included repointing, repairs to the roof, and a new sidewalk on Cascade, among other smaller maintenance issues. Upgrades to the electrical system, also encompassing the replacement of lighting and additional painting, was undertaken in 1965. The following year, over 100 post office boxes were added, bringing the total number available to 709.

In 2010, several exterior window frames were replaced due to rot which had led to some leaks inside the building. The interior of the first floor was painted.

== Significance ==
Along with the post office in Colfax, Washington, the Chehalis Post Office is one of two Georgian Revival style mail buildings in the state. At the time of the NRHP nomination, the Chehalis MPO was declared as "stately in character" and is "an unaltered and well-preserved example of a small town combined post office and federal office building". The nomination recorded the building as maintaining a rich, historical design and was the only building in Chehalis to contain the Georgian Revival style. The post office was added to the National Register of Historic Places on May 30, 1991.

Chehalis was awarded a post office before its larger, neighboring twin city, Centralia, which completed their federal post office in 1937 despite a census of over 8,000. Chehalis, with a population of over 4,900, also had a larger footprint. Two theories suggest that the outsized difference may be due to Congressman Albert Johnson preferring Chehalis over Centralia, or that the decision was made as Chehalis was the county seat. The site remains the only United States federal government post office or building constructed in the city and is considered an example of how citizens and government overcame financial struggles during the Great Depression.

Additional historic recognition of the post office includes a listing with the Washington State Heritage Register on August 31, 1984. The Chehalis Post Office was deemed a historic building by the city via its Chehalis Historic Preservation Commission. The accolade, given in 1993, lists the building as an "example of classical architecture and stone detailing.

== See also ==
- List of United States post offices in Washington
