= List of United States post offices in Wisconsin =

United States post offices operate under the authority of the United States Post Office Department (1792–1971) or the United States Postal Service (since 1971). Historically, post offices were usually placed in a prominent location and many were architecturally distinctive, including notable buildings featuring Beaux-Arts, Art Deco, and Vernacular architecture. However, modern U.S. post offices were generally designed for functionality rather than architectural style.

Following is a list of United States post offices in Wisconsin. Notable post offices include individual buildings, whether still in service or not, which have architectural, historical, or community-related significance. Many of these are listed on the National Register of Historic Places (NRHP) or state and local historic registers.

Post office	City	Date built	Image	Architect	Notes	Ref.
Antigo Post Office	Antigo	1916		James A. Wetmore	(Note: Listed on the National Register of Historic Places.)	
Old Ashland Post Office	Ashland	1892–1893		Willoughby J. Edbrooke, H. P. Padley	(Note: No longer used as a post office.)	
Berlin Post Office	Berlin	1936		Louis A. Simon, Neal A. Melick		
Chilton Post Office	Chilton	1938		Louis A. Simon, Neal A. Melick		
Clintonville Post Office	Clintonville	1935		Louis A. Simon, George O Vannerta		
Columbus Post Office	Columbus	1938		Louis A. Simon, Neal A. Melick		
Delavan Post Office	Delavan	1914		Oscar Wenderoth		
Edgerton Post Office	Edgerton	1939		Louis A. Simon. Neal A. Melick		
Elkhorn Post Office	Elkhorn	1936		Louis A. Simon		
United States Post Office and Courthouse (Eau Claire, Wisconsin)	Eau Claire	1907		James Knox Taylor,Louis A. Simon		
Former United States Post Office (Kaukauna, Wisconsin)	Kaukauna	1934		Louis A. Simon		
Kewaunee Post Office	Kewaunee	1940		Louis A. Simon, Neal A. Melick		
Lancaster Post Office	Lancaster	1938		Louis A. Simon, Neal A. Melick		
United States Post Office and Federal Courthouse (now the Madison Municipal Building)	Madison	1927–1929		James A. Wetmore		
Marshfield Post Office	Marshfield	1930		James A. Wetmore		
J. W. Benn Building	Medford	1912		unknown		
Medford Post Office	Medford	1937		Louis A. Simon, Neal A. Melick		
US Post Office-Menasha	Menasha	1931		James A. Wetmore, Vincent Chibai		
Merrill Post Office	Merrill	1915		James A. Wetmore, W. C. Lyon		
Neenah United States Post Office	Neenah	1916–1918		James A. Wetmore		
Neillsville Post Office	Neillsville	1937		Louis A. Simon, Neal A. Melick	(Note: Built from a standardized plan, also used for post offices in Stoughton and Hartford.)	
Oconto Main Post Office	Oconto	1922		James A. Wetmore		
Park Falls Post Office	Park Falls	1936		Louis A. Simon		
Plymouth Post Office	Plymouth	1941		Louis A. Simon, Neal A. Melick		
Prairie du Chien Post Office	Prairie du Chien	1938		Louis A. Simon		
US Post Office-Racine Main	Racine	1930		James A. Wetmore		
Reedsburg Post Office	Reedsburg	1940		Louis A. Simon, Neal A. Melick		
Shawano Post Office	Shawano	1937–1938		Louis A. Simon, Neal A. Melick		
Sheboygan Post Office	Sheboygan	1937		James A. Wetmore, E. A. Stubenmach		
South Milwaukee Post Office	South Milwaukee	1931		James A. Wetmore		
Sturgeon Bay Post Office	Sturgeon Bay	1937		Louis A. Simon		
Tomah Post Office	Tomah	1927		James A. Wetmore		
Two Rivers Post Office	Two Rivers	1933		James A. Wetmore, Perce G. Schley		
Waukesha Post Office	Waukesha			Oscar Wenderoth		
Waupaca Post Office	Waupaca	1937–1938		Louis A. Simon and Neal A. Melick		
Waupun Post Office	Waupun	1932		James A. Wetmore		
United States Post Office and Court House (Wausau, Wisconsin)	Wausau	1937–1938		Oppenhamer & Obel		
West Allis Post Office	West Allis	1939		Louis A. Simon, Neal A. Melick		
West Bend Post Office	West Bend	1935		Louis A. Simon, Neal A. Melick		
Whitewater Post Office	Whitewater	1936		Louis A. Simon, Neal A. Melick		
