= List of United States post office murals in Wisconsin =

Following is a list of United States post office murals created in Wisconsin between 1934 and 1943.

Location	Mural title	Image	Artist	Date	Notes	NRHP-listed
Berlin Post Office, Berlin	Gathering Cranberries		Raymond Redell	1938	oil on canvas	
Black River Falls	Lumbering-Black River Mill		Frank Buffmire	1939	oil on canvas	
Chilton Post Office, Chilton	Threshing Barley		Charles W. Thwaites	1940	tempera; winner of the 48-State Mural Competition	
Columbus Post Office, Columbus	One Hundredth Anniversary		Charles W. Thwaites	1940	oil on canvas	
De Pere	The Red Pieta		Lester W. Bentley	1942	tempera	
De Pere	Nicholas Perrot		Lester W. Bentley	1942	tempera	
De Pere	Give Us This Day		Lester W. Bentley	1942	tempera	
Edgerton	Tobacco Harvest		Vladimir Rousseff	1941	oil on canvas	
Elkhorn	Pioneer Postman		Tom Rost	1938	oil on canvas	
Hartford	Autumn Wisconsin Landscape		Ethel Spears	1940	oil on canvas	
Hayward	The Land of Woods and Lakes		Stella E. Harlos	1942	oil on canvas	
Hudson	Unloading a River Barge		Ruth Grotenrath	1943	tempera; on display at the Museum of Wisconsin Art in West Bend	
Kaukauna	A. Grignon Trading with the Indians		Vladimir Rousseff	1938	oil on canvas	
Kewaunee	Winter Sports		Paul Faulkner	1940	fresco	
Ladysmith	Development of the Land		Elsa Jemne	1938	tempera; mural has been painted over	
Lake Geneva	Winter Landscape		George Dietrich	1940	oil on canvas	
Lancaster Post Office, Lancaster	Farm Yard		Tom Rost	1940	oil on canvas	
Mayville	Wisconsin Rural Scene		Peter Rotier	1940	oil on canvas	
Neillsville	The Choosing of the County Seat		John Van Koert	1940	tempera	
Oconomowoc	Rabbit Hunters		Edward Morton	1938	oil on canvas	
Oconomowoc	Winter Sports		Edward Morton	1938	oil on canvas	
Park Falls	Lumberjack Fight on the Flambeau River		James Watrous	1938	tempera	
Plymouth Post Office, Plymouth	Making Cheese		Charles W. Thwaites	1942	tempera	
Prairie du Chien Post Office, Prairie du Chien	Discovery of Northern Waters of the Mississippi		Jefferson E. Greer	1938	plaster relief	
Reedsburg Post Office, Reedsburg	Dairy Farming		Richard Jansen	1940	oil on canvas	
Rice Lake	Rural Delivery		Forrest Flower	1938	oil on canvas	
Richland Center	Decorative Interpretation of Unification of America through the Post		Ricard Brooks	1937	oil on canvas	1989
Shawano Post Office, Shawano	The First Settlers		Eugene Higgins	1939	oil on canvas	
Sheboygan	Agriculture		Schomer Lichtner	1939		
Sheboygan	Indian Life		Schomer Lichtner	1939		
Sheboygan	The Lake		Schomer Lichtner	1939		
Sheboygan	The Pioneer		Schomer Lichtner	1939		
Sheboygan	Present City		Schomer Lichtner	1939		
Stoughton	Air Mail Service		Edmund Lewandowski	1940	oil on canvas	
Sturgeon Bay Post Office, Sturgeon Bay	Fruits of Sturgeon Bay		Santos Zingale	1940	egg tempera	
Viroqua	War Party		Forrest Flower	1942	oil on canvas	
Waupaca Post Office, Waupaca	Wisconsin Countryside		Raymond Redell	1940	oil on canvas	
Wausau	Lumbering		Gerrit V. Sinclair	1940	tempera	
Wausau	Rural Mail		Gerrit V. Sinclair	1940	tempera	
West Allis	Wisconsin Wild Flowers – Spring		Frances Foy	1943		
West Allis	Wisconsin Wild Flowers – Autumn		Frances Foy	1943		
West Bend	The Rural Mail Carrier		Peter Rotier	1937	oil on canvas	
