= National Register of Historic Places listings in Shawano County, Wisconsin =

Location of Shawano County in Wisconsin

This is a list of the National Register of Historic Places listings in Shawano County, Wisconsin. It is intended to provide a comprehensive listing of entries in the National Register of Historic Places that are located in Shawano County, Wisconsin. The locations of National Register properties for which the latitude and longitude coordinates are included below may be seen in a map.

There are 6 properties and districts listed on the National Register in the county.

This National Park Service list is complete through NPS recent listings posted August 8, 2025.

== Current listings ==
	Name on the Register	Image	Date listed	Location	City or town	Description
1	Laney School	Laney School	December 4, 1998 (#98001463)	N1675 Laney Rd. 44°38′36″N 88°17′34″W	Maple Grove	One-room schoolhouse built in 1928. Later served as town hall. Apparently burned in February 2011.
2	Lincoln School	Lincoln School	November 7, 2013 (#13000865)	237 S. Sawyer St. 44°46′44″N 88°36′28″W	Shawano	K-8 school designed by Parkinson & Dockendorff in Collegiate Gothic style and built in 1925. Progressive for its time, it contained manual training and domestic science rooms, a gym with showers, and an inviting kindergarten room with a fireplace and a bay window.
3	Lutheran Indian Mission	Lutheran Indian Mission	October 22, 1980 (#80000195)	NE of Gresham on WI G 44°52′39″N 88°45′35″W	Gresham	Mission church and school built in 1901 by Missouri Synod to serve Stockbridge Indians. The school operated until 1958 and the church continues today.
4	Shawano Main Street Historic District	Shawano Main Street Historic District	April 9, 1999 (#99000440)	Roughly including E. Division St. and S. Main St. 44°46′51″N 88°36′33″W	Shawano	Various brick commercial buildings as old as the late 1800s. Main Street lies on the old military road from Green Bay to Ontonagon.
5	Shawano Post Office	Shawano Post Office	October 24, 2000 (#00001241)	235 S. Main St. 44°46′44″N 88°36′34″W	Shawano	New Deal post office with mural by Eugene Higgins.
6	Tigerton Village Hall and Engine House	Tigerton Village Hall and Engine House	November 5, 2008 (#08001036)	215 Cedar St. 44°44′26″N 89°03′50″W	Tigerton	Municipal building and fire station, built in 1905 with support from Herman Swanke, partly to protect his nearby lumber mill.

== See also ==
- List of National Historic Landmarks in Wisconsin
- National Register of Historic Places listings in Wisconsin
- Listings in neighboring counties: Brown, Langlade, Marathon, Menominee, Oconto, Outagamie, Portage, Waupaca
