= National Register of Historic Places listings in Langlade County, Wisconsin =

Location of Langlade County in Wisconsin

This is a list of the National Register of Historic Places listings in Langlade County, Wisconsin. It is intended to provide a comprehensive listing of entries in the National Register of Historic Places that are located in Langlade County, Wisconsin. The locations of National Register properties for which the latitude and longitude coordinates are included below may be seen in a map.

There are 6 properties and districts listed on the National Register in the county.

This National Park Service list is complete through NPS recent listings posted September 25, 2026.

== Current listings ==
	Name on the Register	Image	Date listed	Location	City or town	Description
1	Antigo Depot	Antigo Depot	February 10, 1992 (#92000029)	522 Morse St. 45°08′24″N 89°09′27″W	Antigo	Former Chicago and North Western Railway depot, designed by Charles Sumner Frost in Classical Revival style and built in 1907 of locally-produced brick. Now renovated as apartments.
2	Antigo Opera House	Antigo Opera House	January 12, 1984 (#84003699)	1016 5th Ave. 45°08′27″N 89°09′31″W	Antigo	Theater built in Classical Revival style in 1905 to seat 1100. Served as an armory during World War I.
3	Antigo Post Office	Antigo Post Office	October 24, 2000 (#00001255)	501 ClermontSt. 45°08′22″N 89°09′15″W	Antigo	Classical Revival building with Beaux-Arts influences, built in 1916.
4	Antigo Public Library and Deleglise Cabin	Antigo Public Library and Deleglise Cabin	December 18, 1978 (#78000115)	404 Superior St. 45°08′17″N 89°09′10″W	Antigo	The Deleglise cabin was the first house in Antigo, built in 1878. The former Carnegie library, built 1903-1905 and styled Colonial Revival, is now the Langlade County Historical Society Museum.
5	Langlade County Courthouse	Langlade County Courthouse	July 25, 1977 (#77000034)	800 Clermont St. 45°08′39″N 89°09′19″W	Antigo	Classical Revival courthouse built in 1905, with murals by Swedish artist Axel Soderberg.
6	Modern Woodmen of America Lodge	Modern Woodmen of America Lodge	June 10, 2024 (#100010443)	W10555 County Highway K 45°26′08″N 89°10′50″W	Elcho	Meeting hall built by Modern Woodmen of America in 1913. The building was used by Elcho's Grange from 1932 to 1966. As of 2026 the building houses a local history museum.

== See also ==
- List of National Historic Landmarks in Wisconsin
- National Register of Historic Places listings in Wisconsin
- Listings in neighboring counties: Forest, Lincoln, Marathon, Menominee, Oconto, Oneida, Shawano
