= King Weeman =

American politician

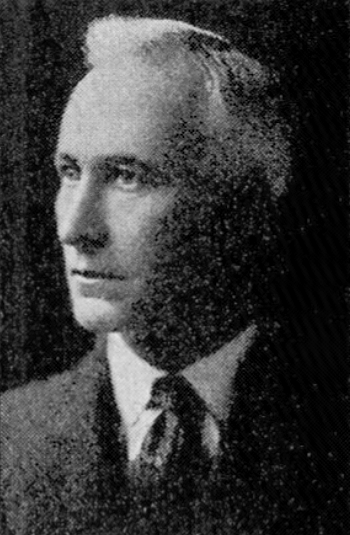

Member of the Wisconsin State Assembly
- In office 1919

Mayor of Shawano, Wisconsin
- In office 1910–1918

Personal details
- Born: March 26, 1872 Branch, Wisconsin, US
- Died: December 23, 1955 (aged 83) Shawano, Wisconsin, US
- Party: Republican
- Occupation: Businessman, politician

King Weeman (March 26, 1872 – December 23, 1955) was an American businessman and politician.

== Biography ==
Born in Branch, Manitowoc County, Wisconsin, Weeman was a telegraph operator for the Lake Shore Western Railroad and Western Road. Later, Weeman was secretary and office manager of Raddant Brewery Company and helped start the Shawano Canning Company. The Shawano Canning Company was incorporated in 1915 with an initial capital of $25,000, with Weeman serving as one of its original directors alongside president A. C. Weber and secretary Albert Trathen. The plant originally packed only green and wax beans, later adding cream style corn. By 1921, Weeman had risen to vice president of the company, and when manager George Greb departed in 1928, Weeman took over as manager. He was elected vice president of the Wisconsin Canners Association in 1933 and 1934, and its president in 1935, subsequently serving as a director of the National Canners Association beginning in 1936. The Shawano Canning Company eventually absorbed the Clintonville Canning Company in 1939 and the Antigo Canning Company in 1947. He lived in Shawano, Wisconsin, and served as its mayor from 1910 to 1918. In 1919, Weeman served in the Wisconsin State Assembly and was a Republican. During World War I, Weeman served on the Shawano Defense Council. Weeman died at his home in Shawano on December 23, 1955.
