= National Association of Towns and Townships =

The National Association of Towns and Townships (NATaT) is an American lobbying or advocacy group of local government from more than 10,000 communities across the United States.

The Washington, DC–based organization was established 1976, with its founding executive director as Barton Russell. Russell served in this capacity until 1985 at which time he was appointed President of the National Center for Small Communities – NATaT's policy development and training arm. Mr. Russell left NATaT in 1994 to launch the Barton Russell Group, a consultancy specializing in the small town America market, it's 34,000 communities and the 140 million people who live in them.

NATaT's purpose today, as it was in 1976, is to champion fair-share federal funding decisions and to promote legislative and regulatory policies designed to strengthen grassroots local government. For more than 40 years NATaT's staff and members have strived to educate lawmakers and other federal officials about the unique nature of small community government operations as well as the need for policies that meet the special needs of suburban and non-metro communities.

NATaT is known in the Nation's Capital as the strong voice of #smalltown America.

== State associations ==
State associations (with website links, when known) include:

- Connecticut Council of Small Towns – website
- Township Officials of Illinois – website
- Indiana Township Association – website
- Michigan Townships Association – website
- Minnesota Association of Townships – website
- Association of Towns of New York – website
- North Dakota Township Officers Association – website
- Ohio Township Association – web pages
- Pennsylvania Association of Township Supervisors – website
- South Dakota Association of Towns and Townships
- Wisconsin Towns Association – website

There are other state level education and advocacy groups for small local-government units. This list contains only those affiliated with the NATaT.
