= Winslow Lake =

Lake in the state of Wisconsin, United States

- Location within Wisconsin Location within the United States
- Location: Oconto County, Wisconsin
- Coordinates: 45°16′8″N 88°30′55″W
- Type: lake
- Primary outflows: First South Branch Oconto River → South Branch Oconto River → Oconto River
- Basin countries: United States
- Surface area: 36 acres (15 ha)
- Max. depth: 33 ft (10 m)
- Surface elevation: 1,168 ft (356 m)
- Settlements: Shawano, Wisconsin

Winslow Lake, also known as Long Lake, is a lake near Shawano, Wisconsin in Oconto County, Wisconsin within the watershed of Green Bay of Lake Michigan. Its outflow is the First South Branch Oconto River by which it is connected to the Camp Five Lake. The outline of the Winslow Lake is formed like an H and it reaches from the southwest to the northeast.
