= Henry Albert Brauer =

American politician

Henry Albert Brauer (1854–1918) was a member of the Wisconsin State Assembly.

== Biography ==
Brauer was born on April 28, 1854, in Bitterfeld, then in the Kingdom of Prussia, to Gottlieb Brauer and Amelia Kramer. Later that year, he moved with his parents to Oshkosh, Wisconsin. In 1871, Brauer moved to Shawano, Wisconsin. He was a barber by trade. Brauer died March 9, 1918, in Chicago, Illinois.

== Political career ==
Brauer was elected to the Assembly in 1892. Other positions he held include Sheriff of Shawano County, Wisconsin. He was a Democrat.
