= Antone Kuckuk =

American politician

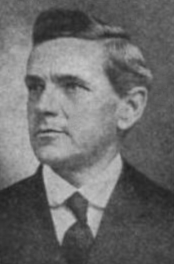

Member of the Wisconsin State Senate
- In office 1917–1925

Member of the Wisconsin State Assembly
- In office 1907

Personal details
- Born: February 10, 1863 Schleisingerville, Wisconsin, US
- Died: October 4, 1946 (aged 83) Shawano, Wisconsin, US
- Party: Republican
- Spouse: Mary E. Pulcifer (m. 1885)
- Children: 2
- Occupation: Banker

Antone Kuckuk (February 10, 1863 – October 4, 1946) was a member of the Wisconsin State Assembly and the Wisconsin State Senate.

== Biography ==
Kuckuk was born to German immigrants on February 10, 1863, in Schleisingerville, Wisconsin. He relocated to Shawano, Wisconsin, in 1882. He married Mary E. Pulcifer on October 20, 1885, and they had two children. He died in Shawano on October 4, 1946. At the time, he was vice-president of the Four Wheel Drive Auto Company.

== Career ==
Kuckuk was a member of the Shawano, Wisconsin School Board and was elected to the Shawano County, Wisconsin Board in 1893. He was elected to the state assembly in 1907. Kuckuk was elected to the state senate in 1916 and re-elected in 1920. He was a Republican.
