= John David Kast =

American politician

John David Kast (December 28, 1824 - February 10, 1900) was a member of the Wisconsin State Assembly.

== Biography ==
Kast was born on December 28, 1824, in Rosenberg, German Empire. He served in the German Federal Army, at least at one point, as an orderly sergeant. Later, Kast settled in Waupaca County, Wisconsin, in 1861 and Shawano, Wisconsin, in 1874. Kast was an Episcopalian and worked as a miller. He died on February 10, 1900.

== Assembly career ==
Kast was elected to the Assembly in 1876. He was a Republican.
