= Charles W. Thwaites =

American painter (1904–2002)

Charles Winstanley Thwaites
- Born: March 21, 1904; Milwaukee, Wisconsin, U.S.
- Died: November 21, 2002 (aged 98); Santa Fe, New Mexico, U.S.
- Resting place: Rosario Cemetery, Santa Fe, New Mexico, U.S.
- Education: University of Wisconsin; Layton School of Art
- Occupation: Painter
- Spouse: Antoinette Thwaites

Charles Winstanley Thwaites (March 21, 1904 – November 21, 2002) was an American painter. He painted murals for the Section of Painting and Sculpture in Wisconsin in the 1930s, and he later became an oil and watercolor painter in New Mexico.

== Life ==
Thwaites was born on March 21, 1904, in Milwaukee, Wisconsin. He graduated from the University of Wisconsin and the Layton School of Art.

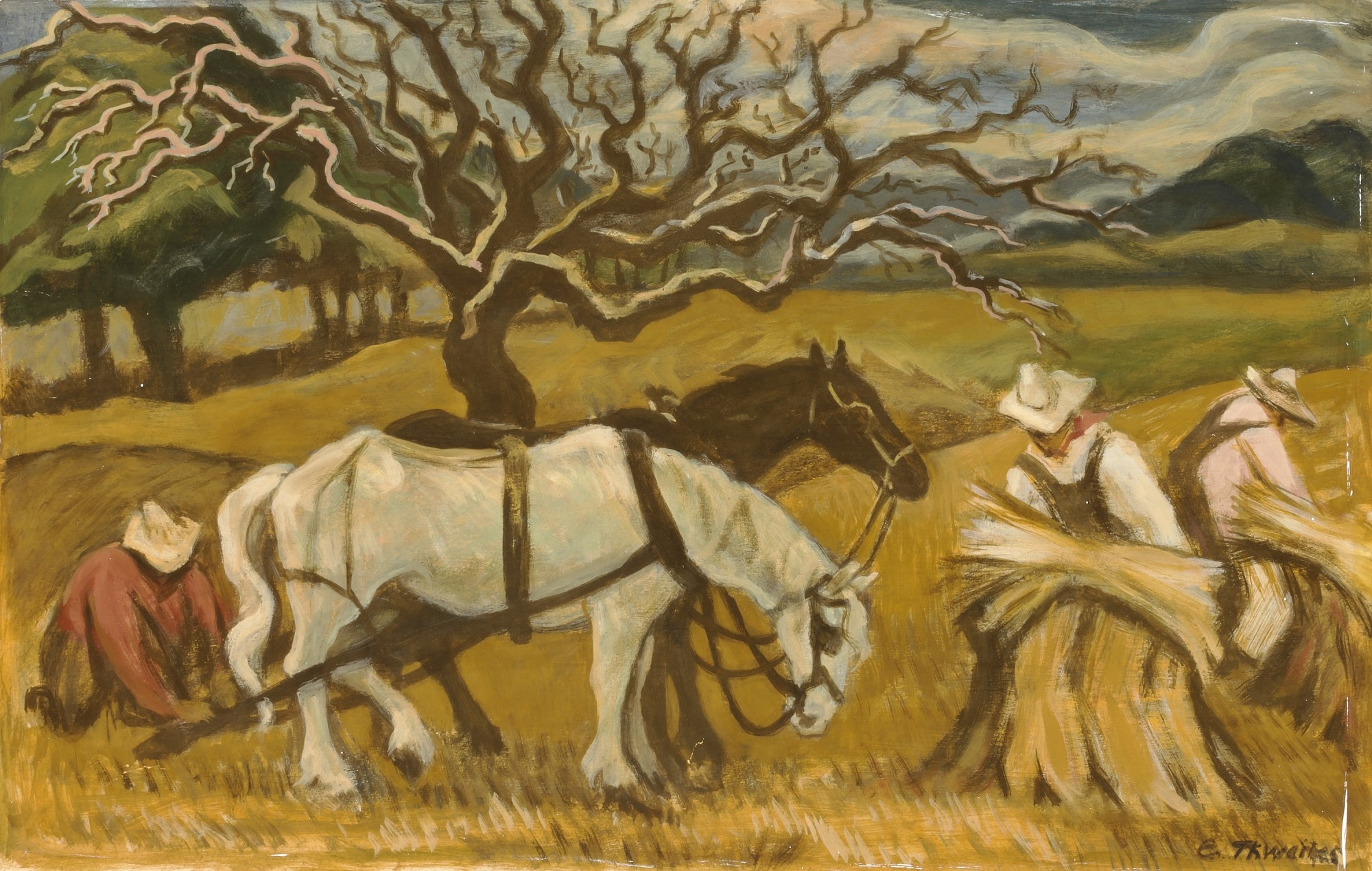
Shocking Grain (1940), in the collection of the Smithsonian American Art Museum.

Thwaites began his career as a muralist for the Treasury Department's Section of Painting and Sculpture from 1936 to 1939. He painted murals in post offices like the NRHP-listed Chilton Post Office and Plymouth Post Office. Thwaites became an oil and watercolor painter in New Mexico, where he settled in Taos in the 1940s and relocated to Santa Fe in the 1960s. He was an artist-in-residence at St. John's College in Santa Fe in 1973.

Thwaites had a wife, Antoinette. He died on November 21, 2002, in Santa Fe, New Mexico, where he was buried in the Rosario Cemetery. His work is in the permanent collection of the Smithsonian American Art Museum.
