= National Register of Historic Places listings in Menominee County, Wisconsin =

Location of Menominee County in Wisconsin

This is a list of the National Register of Historic Places listings in Menominee County, Wisconsin. It is intended to provide a comprehensive listing of entries in the National Register of Historic Places in Menominee County, Wisconsin. The locations of National Register properties for which the latitude and longitude coordinates are included below may be seen on a map.

There is one property listed on the county's National Register.

This National Park Service list is complete through NPS recent listings posted August 1, 2025.

== Current listings ==
	Name on the Register	Image	Date listed	Location	City or town	Description
1	Saint Joseph of the Lake Church and Cemetery	Saint Joseph of the Lake Church and Cemetery	June 2, 2000 (#00000602)	In South Branch, 16 miles from Keshena; 45°01′52″N 88°30′48″W	Menominee Reservation	The cemetery was established around 1876, and the Catholic church building was built in 1891. Some Menominee culture was preserved at South Branch because of its distance from supervision at Keshena.

== See also ==
- List of National Historic Landmarks in Wisconsin
- National Register of Historic Places listings in Wisconsin
- Listings in neighboring counties: Langlade, Oconto, Shawano
