= Samanta Roy Institute of Science and Technology =

Fundamentalist Christian sect

The Samanta Roy Institute of Science and Technology, known also simply as SIST and unofficially as the Ramas, is a secretive fundamentalist Christian-like group based in Shawano, Wisconsin. The group was founded by Rama Behera, a Hindu who converted to Christianity, who later changed his name to Dr. Rama Chandra Samanta Roy and later again to Avraham Cohen. The group has existed in Shawano since the 1970s and was once known as The Disciples of the Lord Jesus Christ. In a 2012 article for the Southern Poverty Law Center's Intelligence Report magazine, many former members spoke out against SIST for alleged abuses ranging from beatings, torture, starvation, child abuse, and neglect from their leader and their followers.

The Southern Poverty Law Center labeled SIST as a "general" hate group for its anti-Catholic beliefs. According to the SPLC, its "general hate" designation covers groups that "...espouse a variety of rather unique hateful doctrines and beliefs that are not easily categorized."

== History ==
The group was formed sometime in the 1970s by Rama Behera, now known as Avraham Cohen, a Hindu-born Christian from India. According to some sources, Cohen received a vision from "God" telling him to spread his word after his conversion to Christianity. He attended college in India and immigrated to the United States to study nuclear engineering at Columbia University in New York City. He moved to Wisconsin to evangelize in places like Green Bay, eventually settling down in the small city of Shawano where he purchased a piece of property that later formed the current compound located on Highway 47/55. He named his followers "The Disciples of the Lord Jesus Christ". In the 1980s, the group's actions led to kidnappings in and around the Shawano area, perpetrated by "deprogrammers". The group was the source of many lawsuits, spreading fear throughout the town.

In 1978, shots were fired at Rama's former house and a pipe bomb exploded in a field near their compound. Nobody was injured, and nobody was charged. Behera's followers claimed it to be a "Vatican Conspiracy" and "White Supremacist attack" against their group.

In 1990, Rama changed his name to Samanta Roy and renamed his group the Samanta Roy Institute of Science and Technology, for he planned to build a college to spread his beliefs. Rama-turned-Roy eventually changed his name again, this time to Avraham Cohen, after "having drifted theologically toward Judaism", and has allegedly never spoken to media since 1982. Cohen still lives in Shawano.

In the 2000s, the group purchased businesses all throughout the Shawano area including a gas station, a hotel, a motorsports complex, multiple restaurants and, a gift shop. Most of them have gone bankrupt and closed down. The group blamed its financial issues on the mayor and the officials of Shawano, referring to them as "Catholic beasts" and "Neo-Nazis", alleging that the mayor of Shawano was planning to destroy SIST. In 2009, the FBI found a hit list allegedly authored by members of the group, with 60 people listed, including the mayor herself. The FBI warned city officials about the list, which caused them to evacuate the town.

SIST came to police attention again on June 9, 2010, following an assault in Pikesville, Maryland, on a house owned by Avraham Cohen. SIST denies this had anything to do with the group and the case has since gone cold.

In recent times, the group has been subject to controversy over this mismanagement of local businesses and unpaid taxes. The group's current executive director, Naomi Issacson, claims SIST "is not a religious organization" and has nothing to do with the Disciples of the Lord Jesus Christ. SIST also claims that those who say that they are a religious hate group are just part of a "Vatican Conspiracy by [former Shawano] Mayor Lorna Marquardt and her followers".

Many former members spoke out against the group and their alleged abuses, including beatings, tortures, forced labor, and various other incidents. A woman claimed that she was "zapped" by a cattle prod for disobeying Cohen. Cohen has been accused by former members of the Disciples of the Lord Jesus Christ and SIST of controlling his group through mental and physical abuse, from forcing children to cut grass with scissors to having their heads shaved for disobeying him, and suffering neglect and physical punishment.
