= Michael J. Wallrich =

American politician

Michael Jefferson Wallrich (March 25, 1857 – March 2, 1941) was a member of the Wisconsin State Assembly.

== Biography ==
Wallrich was born on March 25, 1857, in Brighton, Kenosha County, Wisconsin. He attended the University of Wisconsin-Madison and the University of Wisconsin Law School. He died on March 2, 1941.

== Career ==
Wallrich was elected to the Assembly in 1902. Additionally, he served as City Attorney of Shawano, Wisconsin, District Attorney of Shawano County, Wisconsin, Chairman of the Shawano County Republican Committee, a member of the Shawano County Board and Mayor of Shawano. He was also a delegate to the Republican State Convention of Wisconsin in 1886, 1888, 1890 1892, 1894, 1896, 1900 and 1902.
