= South Milwaukee Post Office =

- U.S. National Register of Historic Places
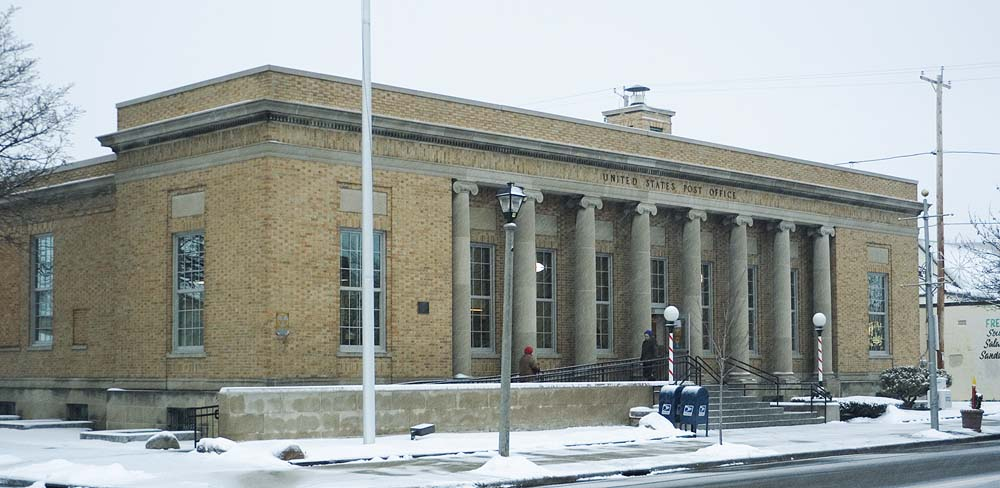
- South Milwaukee Post Office
- Location: 2210 10th Ave. South Milwaukee, Wisconsin
- Coordinates: 42.90914°N 87.86122°W
- Built: 1931
- Architect: James A. Wetmore
- Architectural style: Classical Revival
- NRHP reference No.: 00001251
- Added to NRHP: October 24, 2000

The South Milwaukee Post Office is a Neoclassical-styled U.S. Post office built in South Milwaukee, Wisconsin in 1931. It was added to the National Register of Historic Places in 2000.

== History ==
This is the first federally-owned post office in South Milwaukee. Designed under James A. Wetmore, the building has brick walls sitting on a limestone foundation. The front entrance passes through a colonnade of eight Ionic columns. Despite interior remodeling and an addition to the rear of the building around 1960, the original Terrazzo Floor and marble wainscotting remain, as does the cove molding with a dentil trim at the ceiling. A fallout shelter was built inside it.
