= Paul Faulkner =

American artist

Paul W. Faulkner (April 2, 1913 – January 5, 1997) was an American artist.

== Early life ==
Born in North Platte, Nebraska, Faulkner received a bachelor's degree from the University of Nebraska and a master's degree from the Chicago Art Institute.

== Career ==
Faulkner was an instructor at the Layton School of Art in Milwaukee, Wisconsin and at the Norwich Free Academy in Norwich, Connecticut. He also worked at the Smithsonian Institution in Washington, DC.

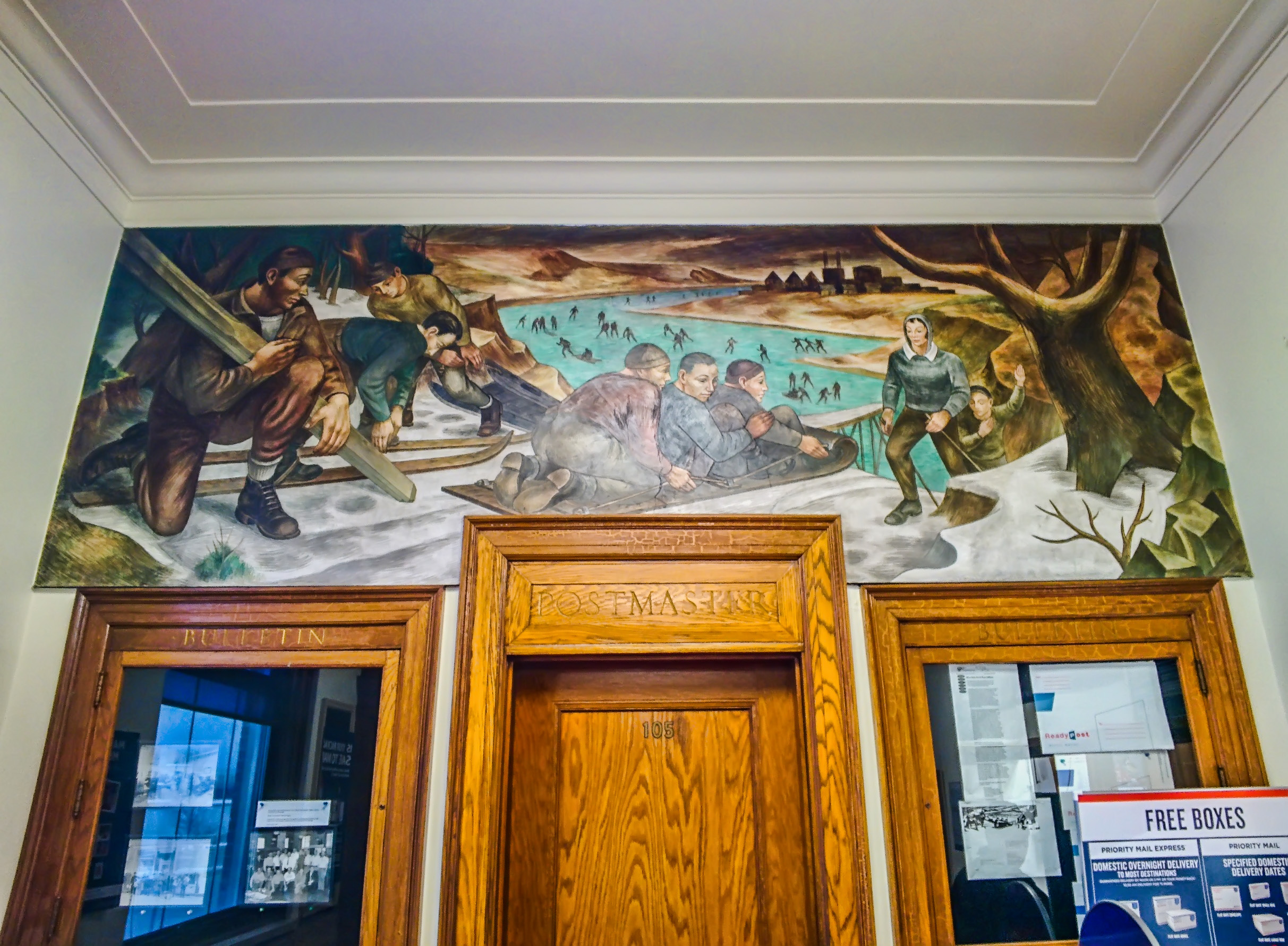
"Winter Sports" in the Kewaunee, Wisconsin post office

Faulkner painted post office murals as part of the New Deal. In 1940 he painted the fresco Winter Sports at the post office in Kewaunee, Wisconsin. It was based on an earlier design of his, with a local factory added to indicate its location. In 1943 he painted the a mural "Farm Scene" at the Clarion, Iowa post office.

Faulkner lived in Uncasville, Connecticut and died in Montville, Connecticut.
