= Kewaunee Post Office =

- U.S. National Register of Historic Places
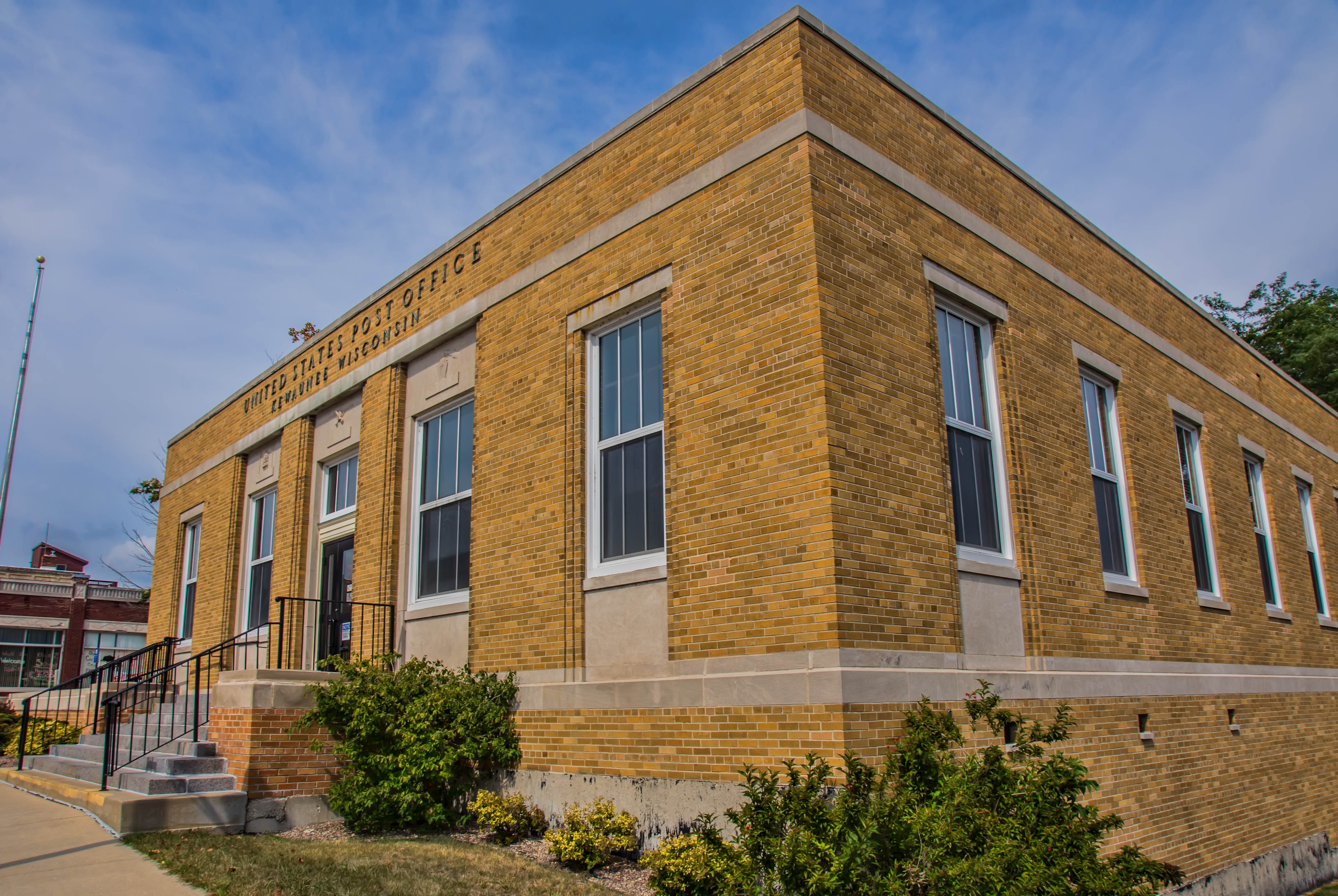
- Location: 119 Ellis St., Kewaunee, Wisconsin
- Coordinates: 44°27′30″N 87°30′3″W
- Area: less than one acre
- Built: 1940
- Built by: Melick, Neal A.
- Architect: Simon, Louis A.
- Architectural style: Modern Movement
- MPS: United States Post Office Construction in Wisconsin MPS
- NRHP reference No.: 00001247
- Added to NRHP: October 24, 2000

The Kewaunee Post Office is located in Kewaunee, Wisconsin at 119 Ellis Street. The building was designed Louis A. Simon and built by Neal A. Melick. It is listed on the National Register of Historic Places. The building contains the mural "Winter Sports", painted by Paul Faulkner in 1940, and funded as part of the New Deal.

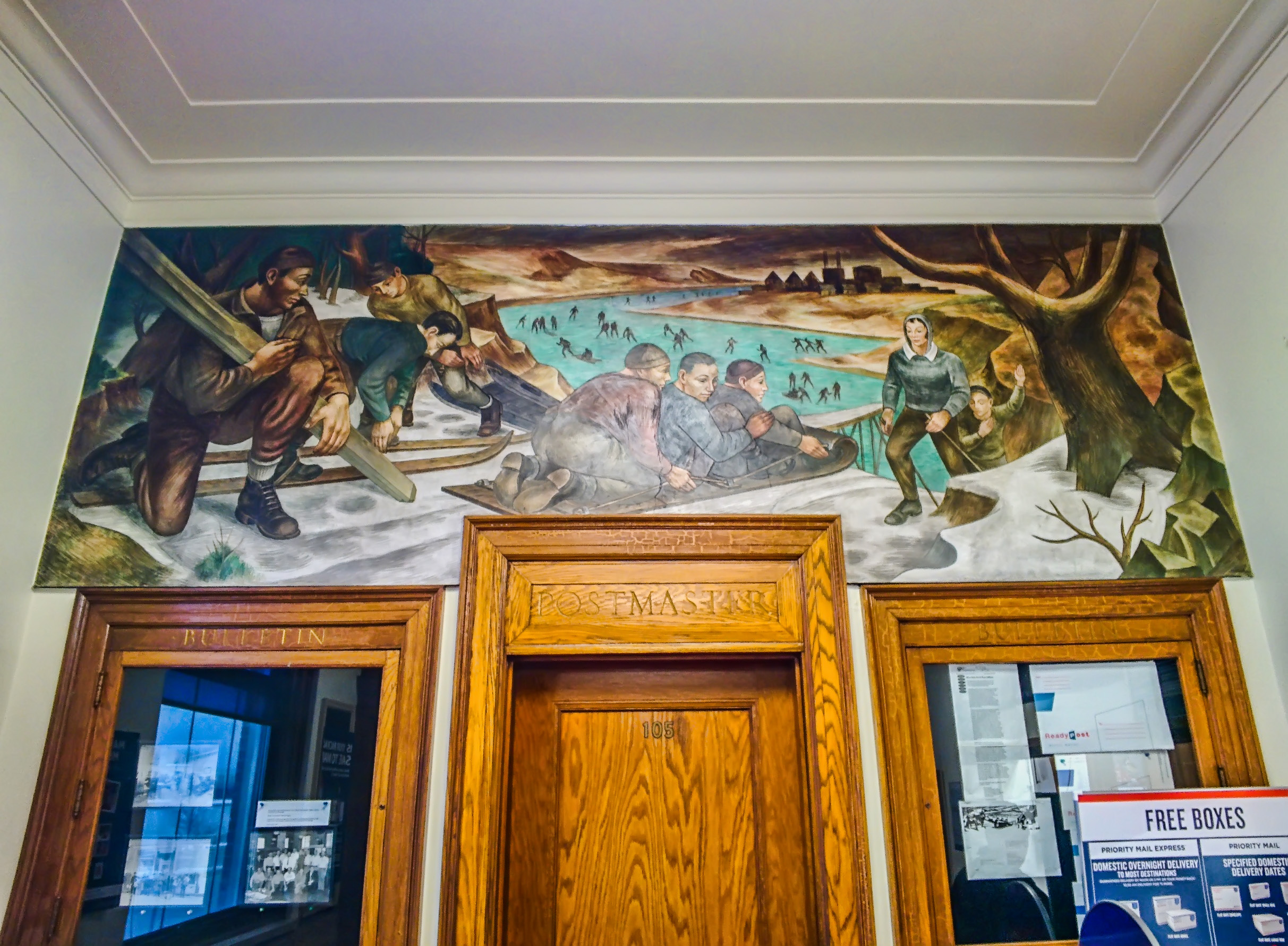
Door to the Postmasters office, above which is the mural "Winter Sports", painted by Paul Faulkner in 1940, and funded as part of the New Deal.
