= Neillsville Post Office =

- U.S. National Register of Historic Places
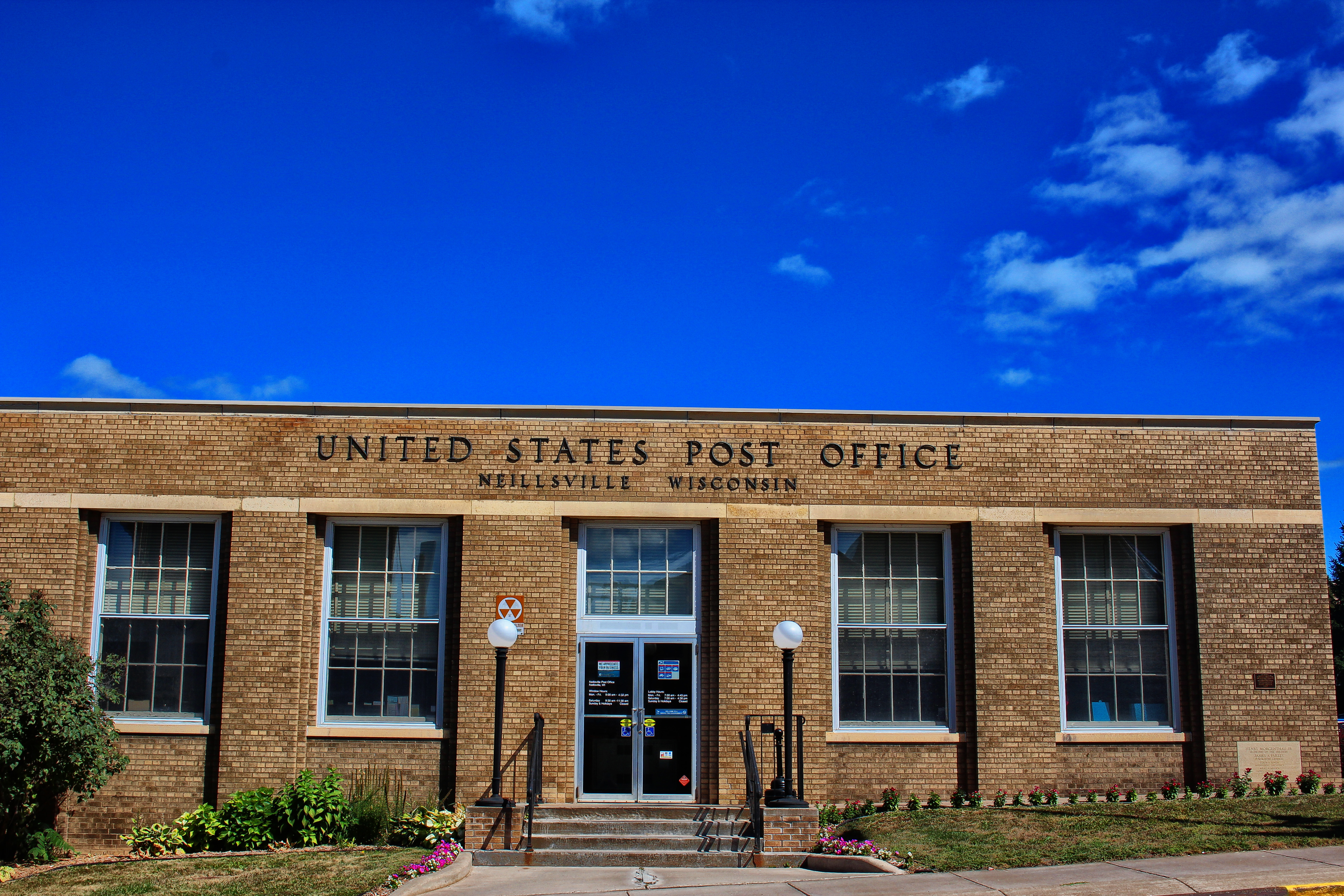
- Mural located inside the Neillsville Post Office.
- Location: 619 Hewett St. Neillsville, Wisconsin
- Coordinates: 44.56101°N 90.59603°W
- Architectural style: Modern Movement
- NRHP reference No.: 00001257
- Added to NRHP: October 24, 2000

The Neillsville Post Office is a historic building added to the National Register of Historic Places in 2000.

This building is the first federally owned post office in Neillsville. Before that, postal services were provided from a private location chosen by the postmaster at the time. From 1890 to 1938, that was from a site just to the north of this building.

In 1937 the Public Works Administration built the current building from a standardized plan, the same used for post offices in Stoughton and Hartford.

== Mural ==
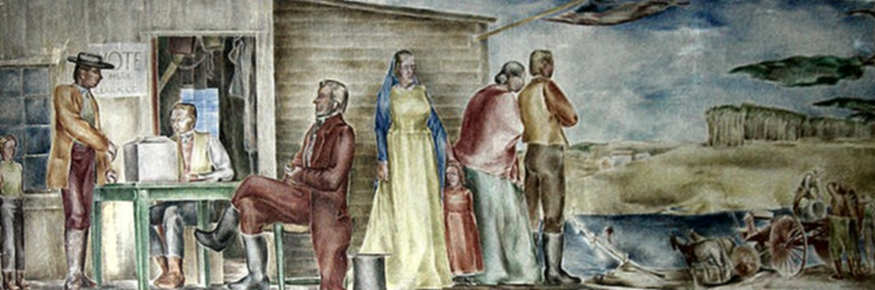
The Choosing of the County Seat, by John Van Koert, 1940

The post office features a mural painted during a US Interior Department's Federal Art Project that designated 1% of the building's cost of construction for art work. In the 1940 mural, artist John Van Koert depicts the 1854 vote in which Clark County's citizens chose O'Neill's Mills (later Neillsville) as the county seat over Weston Rapids, a little mill town three miles up the Black River. Supposedly James O'Neill provided free whiskey, so that many voters from Weston Rapids were too tipsy to traverse the boom across O'Neill Creek, and didn't make it to the polls, tipping the vote toward O'Neill's Mills.
