= Neenah United States Post Office =

- U.S. National Register of Historic Places
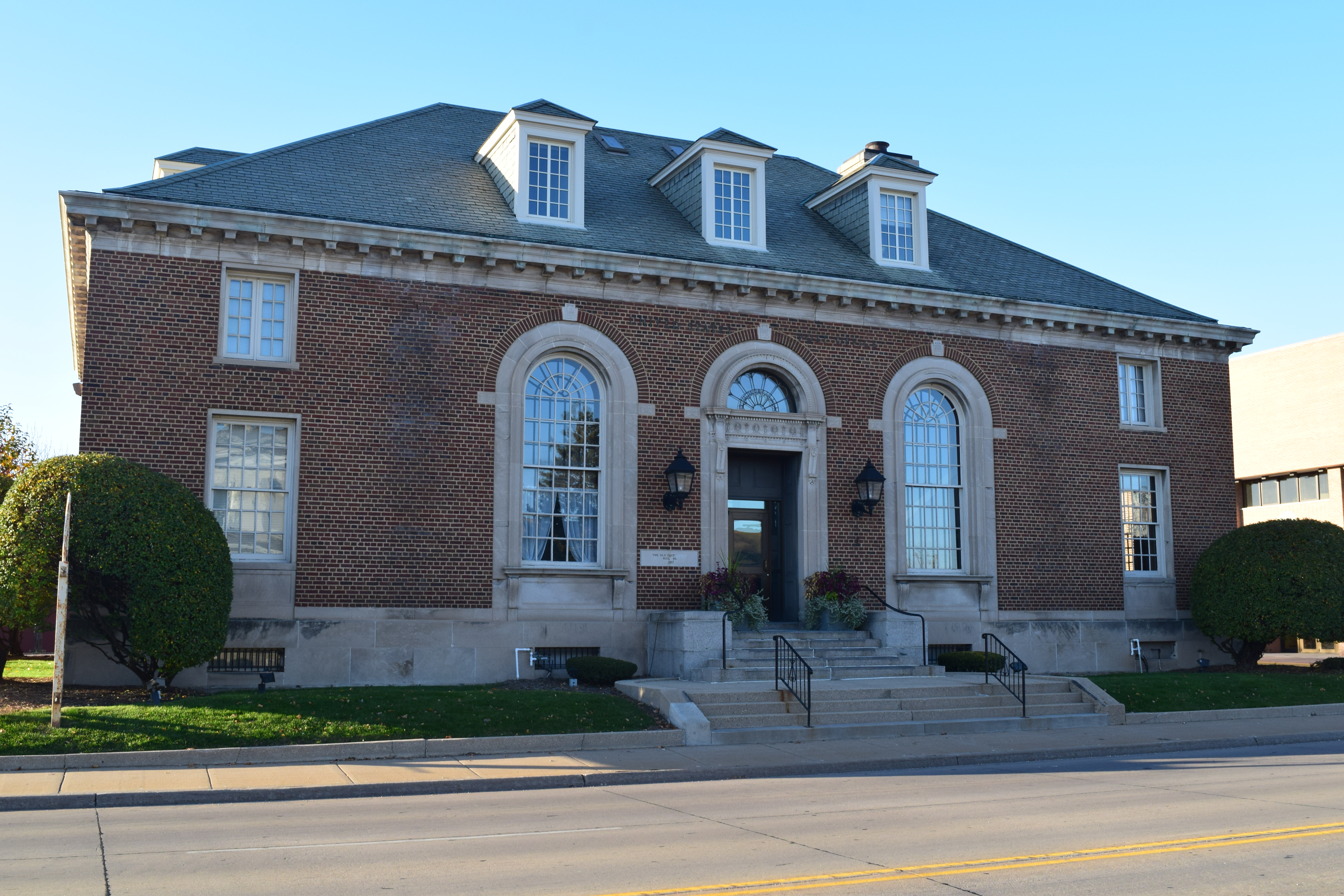
- Neenah United States Post Office

- Location within Wisconsin
- Location: 307 S. Commercial St., Neenah, Wisconsin
- Coordinates: 44°11′05″N 88°27′48″W
- Area: 0.8 acres (0.32 ha)
- Built: 1916-1918
- Architect: James A. Wetmore/William Sample/C.W. Grindele Co.
- Architectural style: Colonial Revival, Georgian Revival
- NRHP reference No.: 90001743
- Added to NRHP: November 8, 1990

The Neenah United States Post Office is located in Neenah, Wisconsin.

== Description and history ==
Among the features of the building are a fanlight and a palladian window. Postal operations have since been moved to a different location, and this building has been converted into offices. It was added to the State and the National Register of Historic Places in 1990.

It is a Georgian Revival post office with fanlight and palladian window, built 1916-18. The building’s construction was authorized by the U.S. Treasury Department in 1916 and it served as Neenah’s main post office until operations moved to a newer facility in 1967.
