= Wisconsin Towns Association =

The Wisconsin Towns Association (WTA) is an organization of Wisconsin's 1,259 towns. Founded in 1947, it is a non-profit and non-partisan association. It is based out of Shawano, Wisconsin.

The WTA lobbies for various issues for the benefit for Wisconsin towns and municipalities. Including but not limited to Fire/EMS, land use, agriculture, and/or transportation.

The WTA also has lobbyist inside the Wisconsin State Legislature.

WTA is separated into six districts. WTA provides education, legal information, and grassroots legislative advocacy for towns statewide.
