= Antigo Opera House =

- U.S. National Register of Historic Places
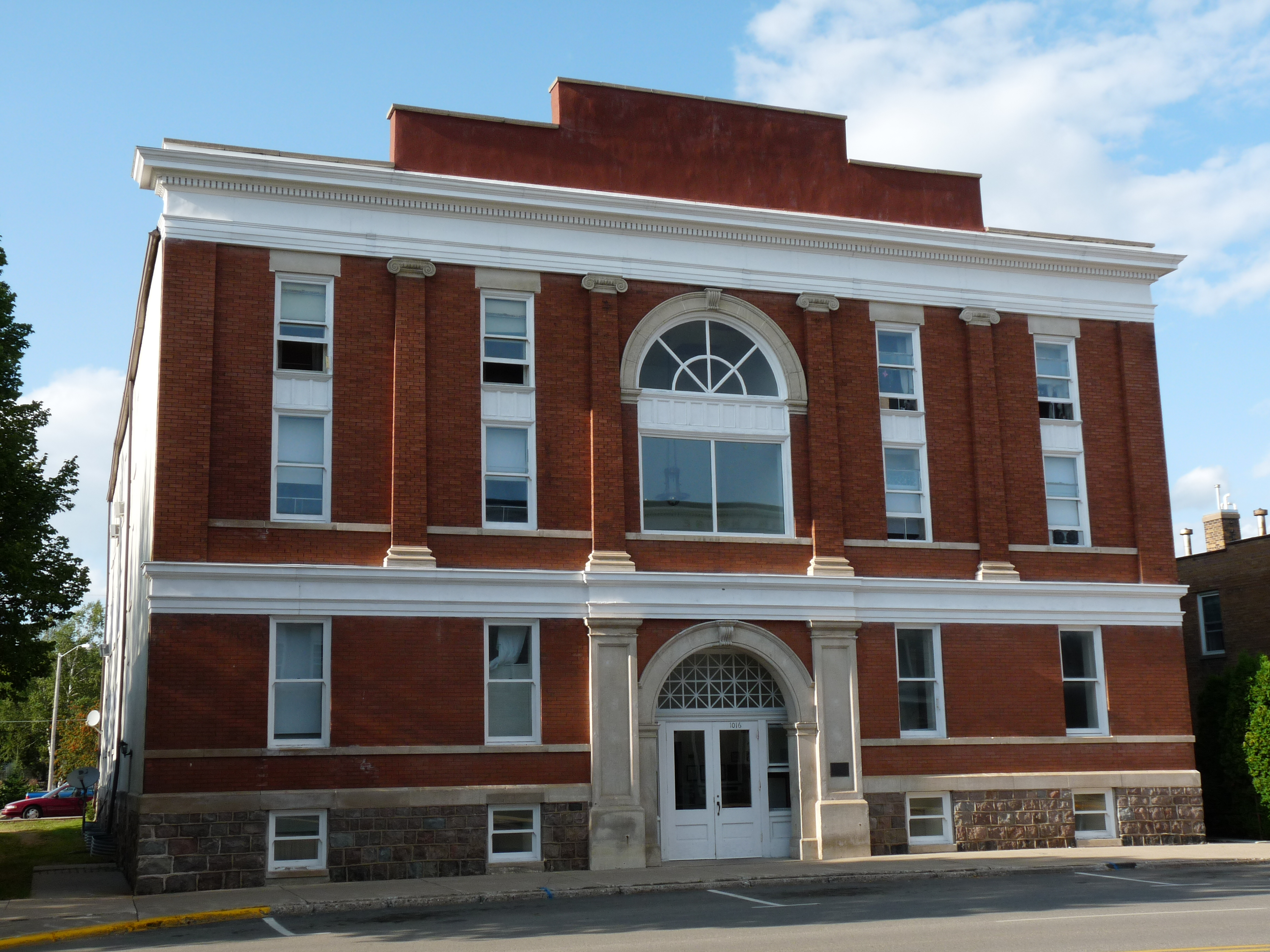

- Location within Wisconsin Location within the United States
- Location: 1016 5th Ave., Antigo, Wisconsin
- Coordinates: 45°8′27″N 89°9′31″W
- Area: less than one acre
- Built: 1904
- Architect: Jeffers, J. H., & Co.
- Architectural style: Classical Revival
- NRHP reference No.: 84003699
- Added to NRHP: January 12, 1984

The Antigo Opera House is a historic opera house and concert hall in Antigo, Wisconsin, United States. The brick building was built in 1904 by architect J.H. Jeffers in the Classical Revival style. The opera house could seat 1100 people. In addition to its use for entertainment, the building served as an armory during World War I and is now an apartment building. The opera house was added to the National Register of Historic Places on January 12, 1984.
