= West Allis Post Office =

- U.S. National Register of Historic Places
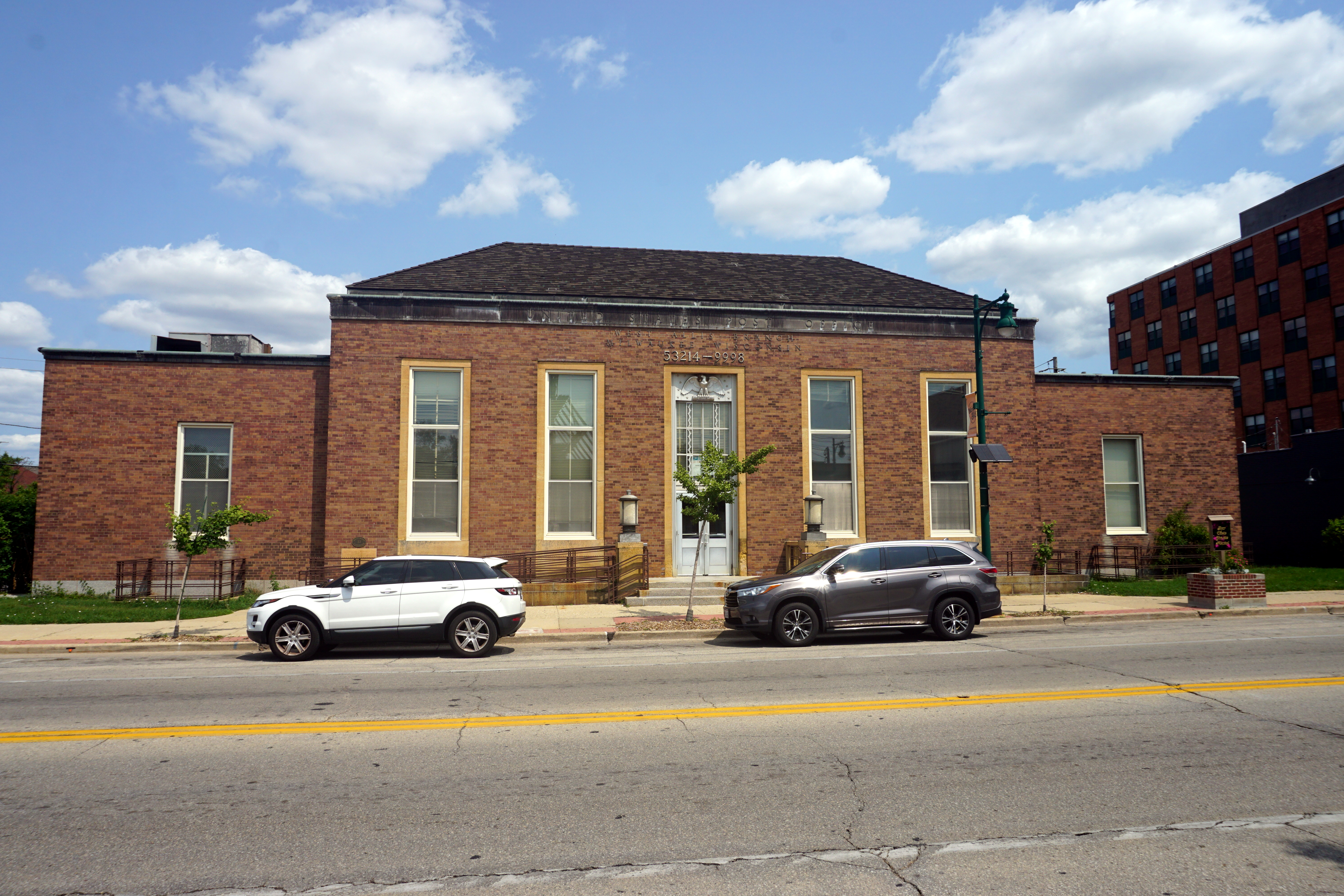
- West Allis Post Office
- Location: 7440 W. Greenfield Ave. West Allis, Wisconsin
- Coordinates: 43.01688°N 88.00567°W
- Built: 1939
- Architect: Neal A. Melick/Louis A. Simon
- Architectural style: Modern Movement
- NRHP reference No.: 01000174
- Added to NRHP: February 23, 2001

The West Allis Post Office is a historic U.S. Post Office built in West Allis, Wisconsin in 1939. It was added to the National Register of Historic Places in 2001.

The post office was built by the Public Works Administration of the New Deal from 1939-40. The style is Stripped Classical, combining the massing and symmetry of Neoclassical style with some of the simplicity and anonymity of Moderne style. The building is two stories, brown brick walls sitting on a granite base, with a minimal cornice and a low hip roof. The front door and window openings are large, two stories tall, and arranged symmetrically, to perhaps suggest the grand portico of a Greek temple. Centered above the door is a sculpted eagle surrounded by stars. Inside, the walls are finished in marble wainscot and plaster. The lobby floor is beige terrazzo tiles with a red terrazzo border.

In the lobby are two large murals painted by Frances Foy in 1942: Wisconsin Wild Flowers - Spring and Wisconsin Wild Flowers - Autumn. Foy painted the murals for the Section of Fine Arts, a New Deal project. One percent of the cost of the public building was reserved for art in the building, aiming to provide work for artists and to decorate the building with art that was locally relevant and that would raise the morale of the viewing public.
