= Branch, Wisconsin =

- Unincorporated community
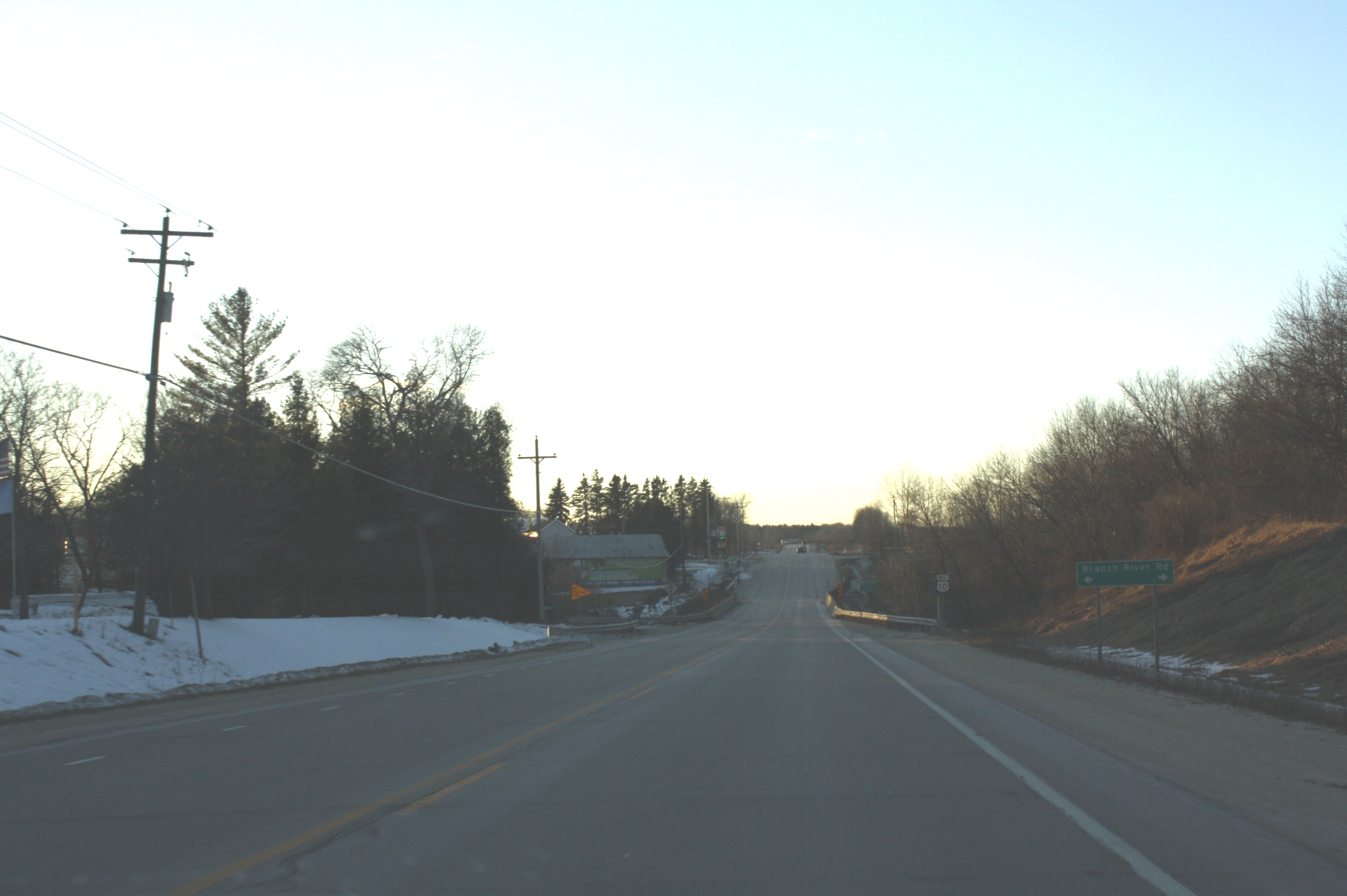
- Looking west at Branch

- Location within Wisconsin Location within the United States
- Coordinates: 44°08′45″N 87°45′40″W
- Country: United States
- State: Wisconsin
- County: Manitowoc
- Elevation: 751 ft (229 m)
- Time zone: UTC-6 (Central (CST))
  - Summer (DST): UTC-5 (CDT)
- Area code: 920
- GNIS feature ID: 1562140

Branch is an unincorporated community located in the Town of Manitowoc Rapids, in Manitowoc County, Wisconsin, United States. Branch is located on U.S. Route 10, east of Whitelaw.

Branch was named for the nearby Branch River, which flows into the Manitowoc River.
