= Antigo Post Office =

- U.S. National Register of Historic Places
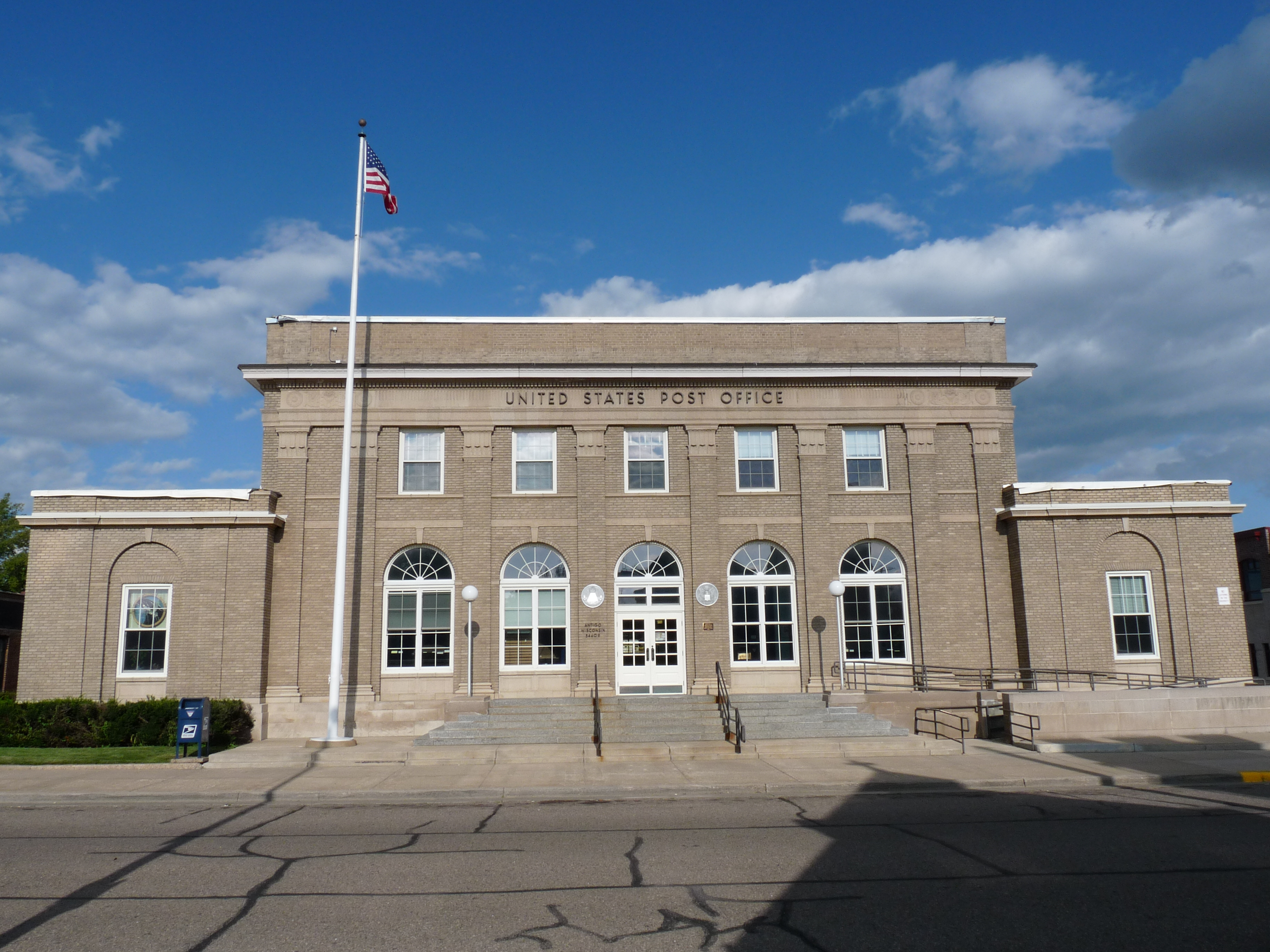

- Location within Wisconsin Location within the United States
- Interactive map showing the location of Antigo Post Office
- Location: 501 Clermont St., Antigo, Wisconsin
- Coordinates: 45°8′20″N 89°9′16″W
- Area: less than one acre
- Built: 1916
- Architect: Wetmore, James
- Architectural style: Classical Revival
- MPS: United States Post Office Construction in Wisconsin MPS
- NRHP reference No.: 00001255
- Added to NRHP: October 24, 2000

The Antigo Post Office is the post office serving the city of Antigo, Wisconsin. The post office was built in 1916 in the Classical Revival style using brick, with limestone and granite features; at the time, it cost $60,000 to build. Antigo has had a post office since 1879; however, this post office was the first owned by the federal government. The post office was added to the National Register of Historic Places on October 24, 2000; it is one of 27 post offices on the National Register in Wisconsin.
