= Plymouth Post Office =

- U.S. National Register of Historic Places
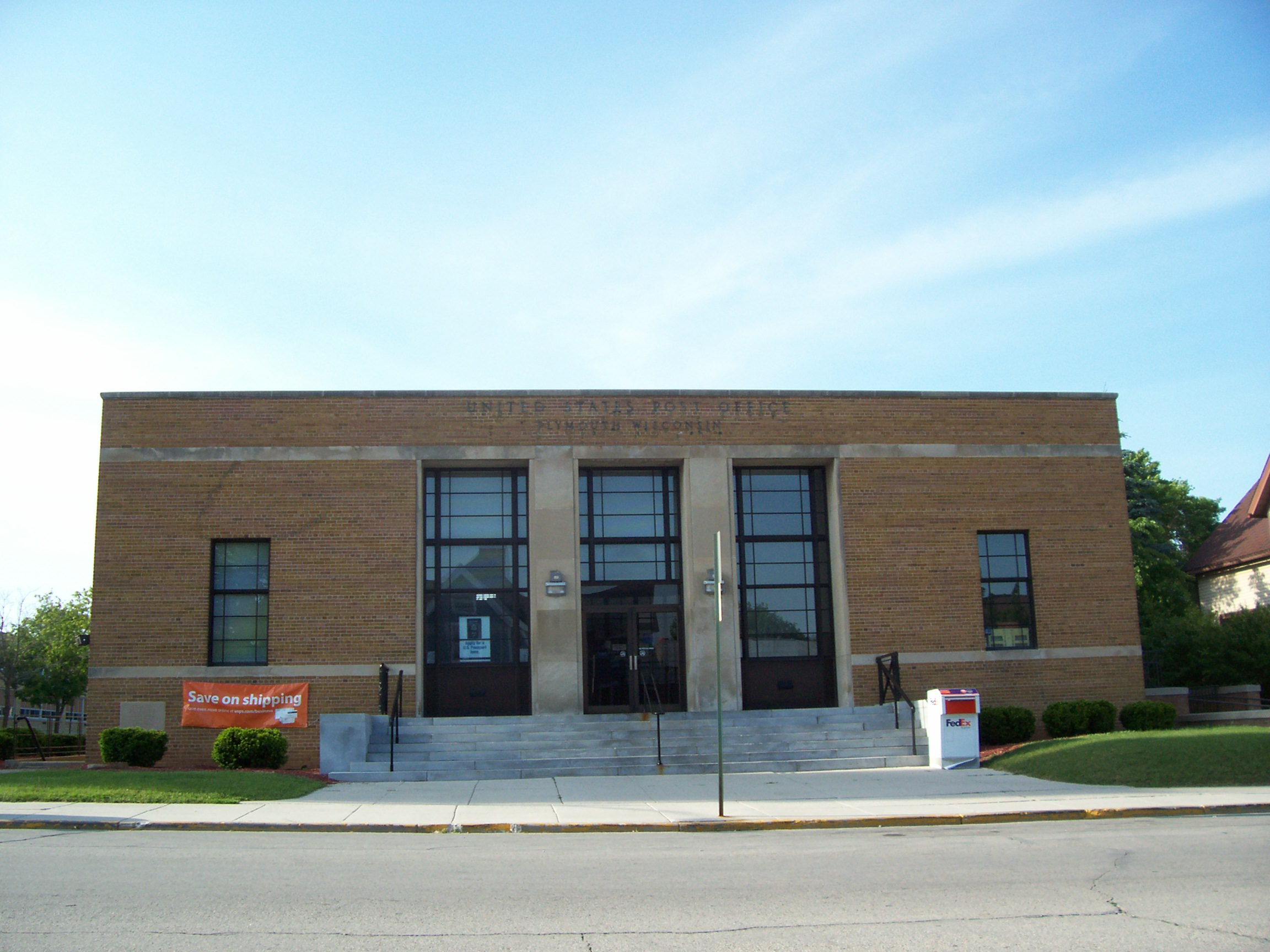
- The Plymouth Post Office in 2008

- Location within Wisconsin
- Interactive map showing the location of the Plymouth Post Office
- Location: 302 East Main Street, Plymouth, Wisconsin
- Coordinates: 43°44′57″N 87°58′37″W
- Area: less than one acre
- Built: 1941
- Architect: Louis A. Simon
- Architectural style: PWA Moderne
- MPS: United States Post Office Construction in Wisconsin MPS
- NRHP reference No.: 00001242
- Added to NRHP: October 24, 2000

The Plymouth Post Office is a historic one-story building in Plymouth, Wisconsin. It was designed in the PWA Moderne by supervising architect Louis A. Simon, and built in 1941. Inside, there is a mural by Charles W. Thwaites depicting cheese making, the main industry in Plymouth. The building has been listed on the National Register of Historic Places since October 24, 2000.
