= Reedsburg Post Office =

- U.S. National Register of Historic Places
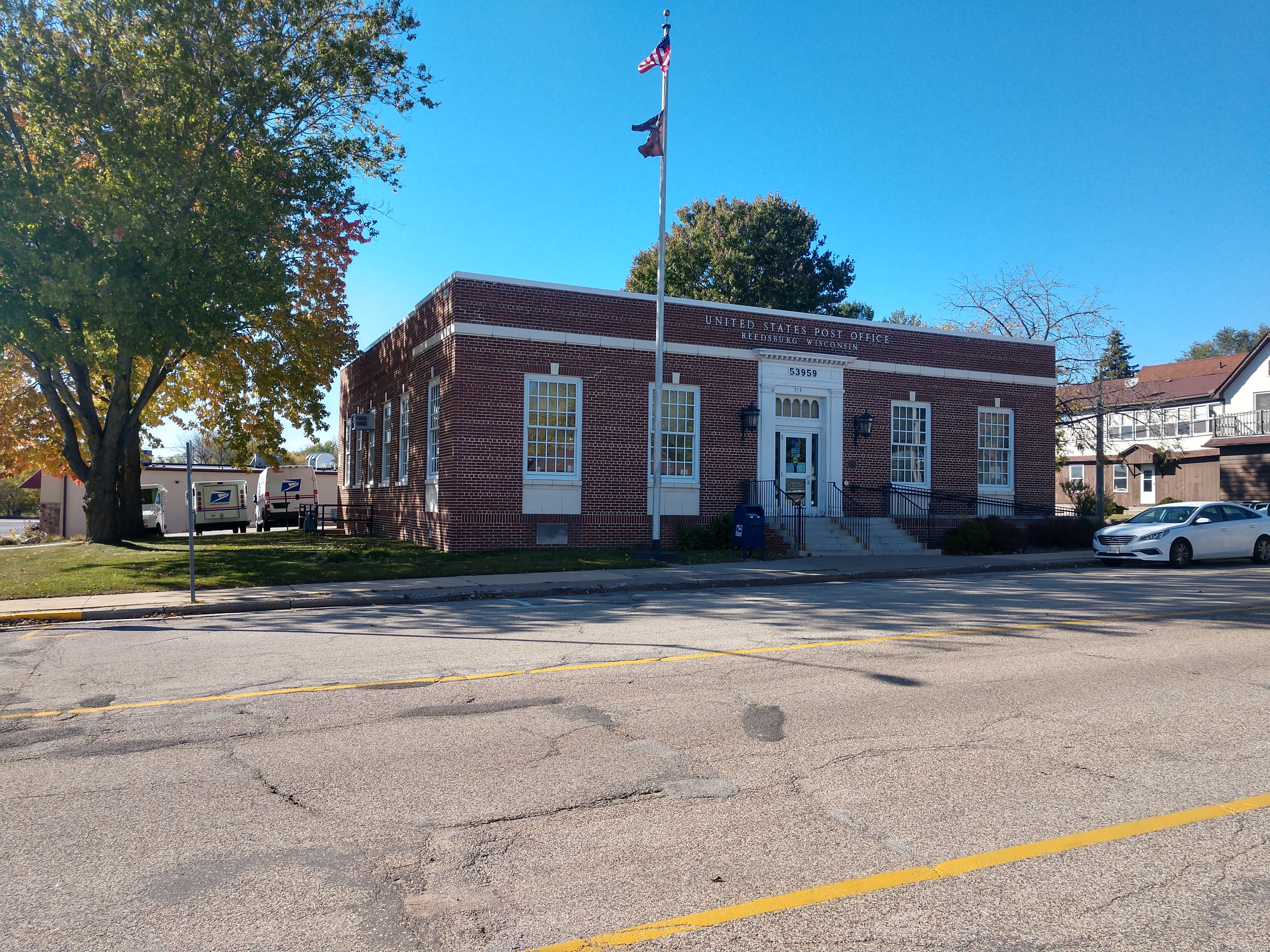
- Location: 215 N. Walnut St., Reedsburg, Wisconsin
- Coordinates: 43°32′01″N 90°00′30″W
- Area: less than one acre
- Built: 1940
- Architect: Jansen, Richard; Simon, Louis and Melick, Neal A.
- Architectural style: Colonial Revival
- MPS: United States Post Office Construction in Wisconsin MPS
- NRHP reference No.: 00001240
- Added to NRHP: October 24, 2000

The Reedsburg Post Office is a historic post office located in Reedsburg, Wisconsin. In 2000 it was added to the National Register of Historic Places. The building still serves as the post office for the 53959 ZIP Code.

== History ==
In 1872, mail service came to Reedsburg, with the opening of the Chicago and North Western Depot. The post office was held in various locations on Main Street, until 1936. With the help of local senators, a new building was going to be built solely for the Post Office. The location on North Walnut Street was picked, and construction started in 1938. The building was listed on the National Register of Historic Places in 2000.
