= Shawano Post Office =

- U.S. National Register of Historic Places
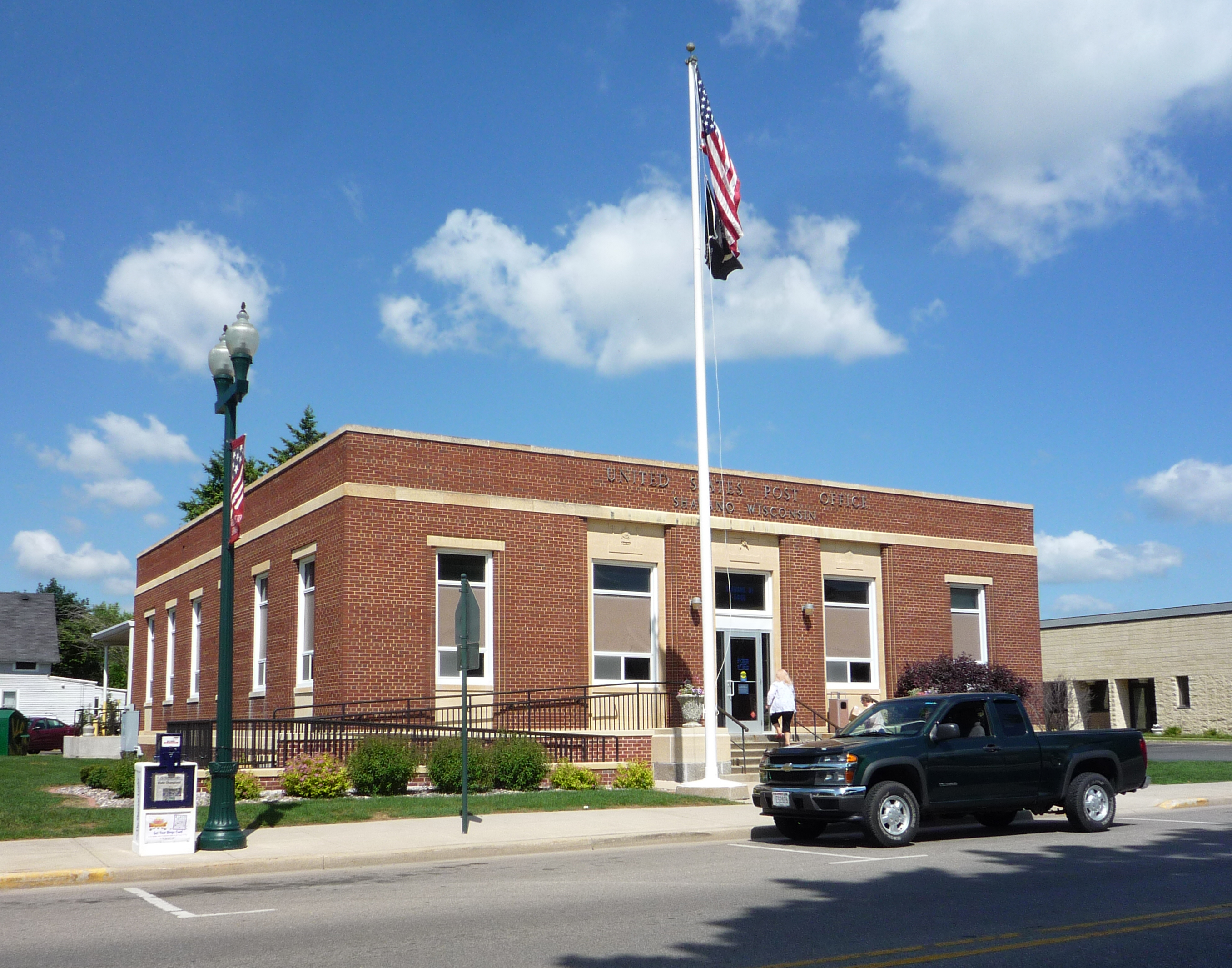
- Shawano Post Office
- Location: 235 S. Main St., Shawano, Wisconsin
- Coordinates: 44°46′44″N 88°36′34″W
- Area: less than one acre
- Built: 1937-1938
- Architect: Louis A. Simon
- Architectural style: Art Moderne/Commercial Vernacular
- MPS: United States Post Office Construction in Wisconsin MPS
- NRHP reference No.: 00001241
- Added to NRHP: October 24, 2000

The Shawano Post Office is located in Shawano, Wisconsin.

== History ==
The post office was built by the Public Works Administration as part of the New Deal. Its interior features a mural by artist Eugene Higgins entitled 'Early Settlers', completed in 1939.
