= Chilton Post Office =

- U.S. National Register of Historic Places
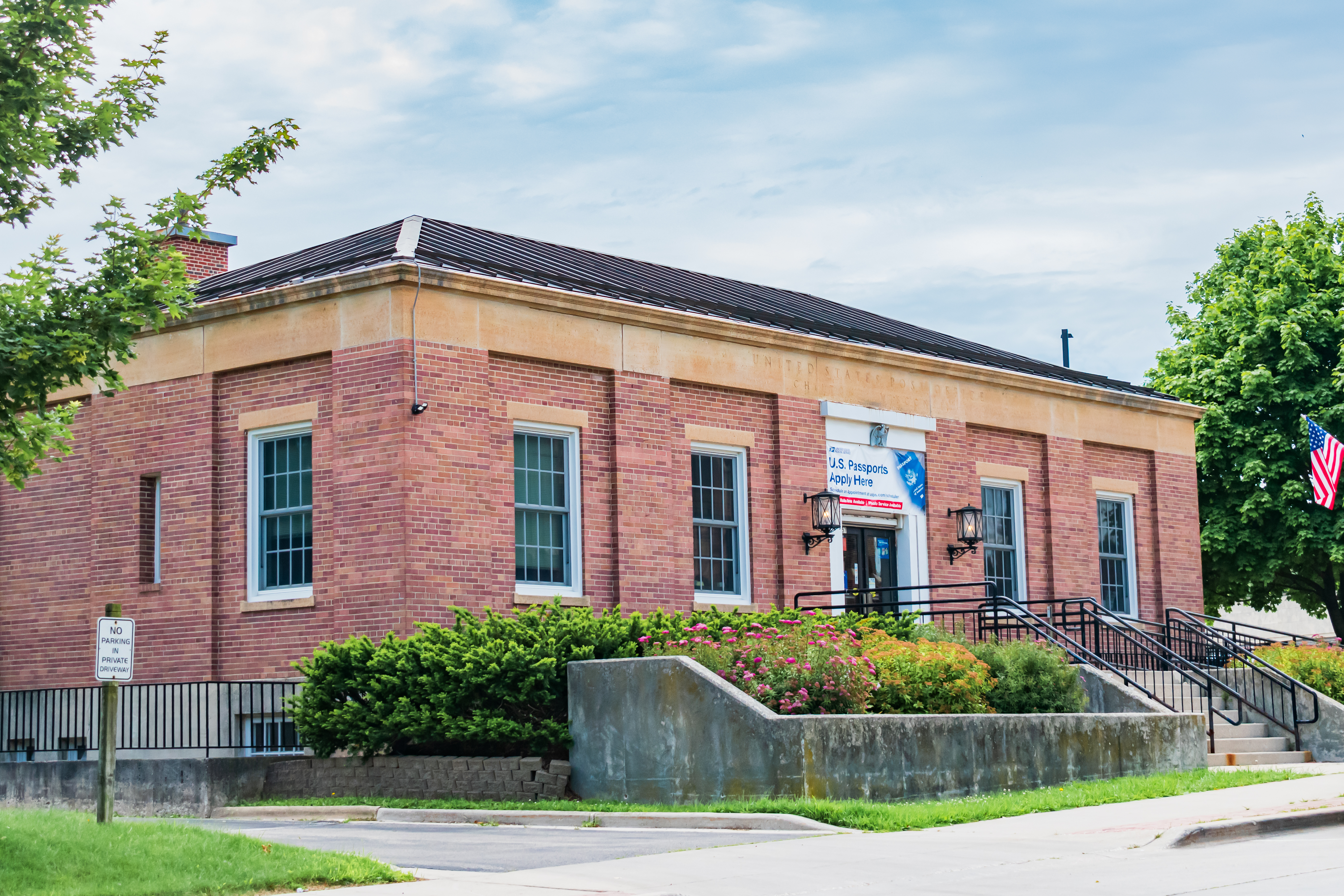

- Location within Wisconsin Location within the United States
- Location: 57 E. Main St., Chilton, Wisconsin
- Coordinates: 44°1′45″N 88°9′41″W
- Area: less than one acre
- Built: 1938
- Architect: Thwaites, Charles W.; Simon, Louis A. and Melick, Neal A.
- Architectural style: Georgian Revival
- MPS: United States Post Office Construction in Wisconsin MPS
- NRHP reference No.: 00001249
- Added to NRHP: October 24, 2000

The Chilton Post Office is a historic post office located at 57 E. Main St. in Chilton, Wisconsin, United States. The post office was built in 1938 and designed in the Georgian Revival style. The red brick building has a metal hip roof in the front and a flat roof in the back. The front entrance has a pair of bronze aluminum doors with white trim topped by a metal eagle. A Works Progress Administration mural by Charles Winstanley Thwaites, titled "Threshing Barley", is painted on a wall in the lobby.

The post office was added to the National Register of Historic Places on October 24, 2000.
