= Shawano, Wisconsin =

- City
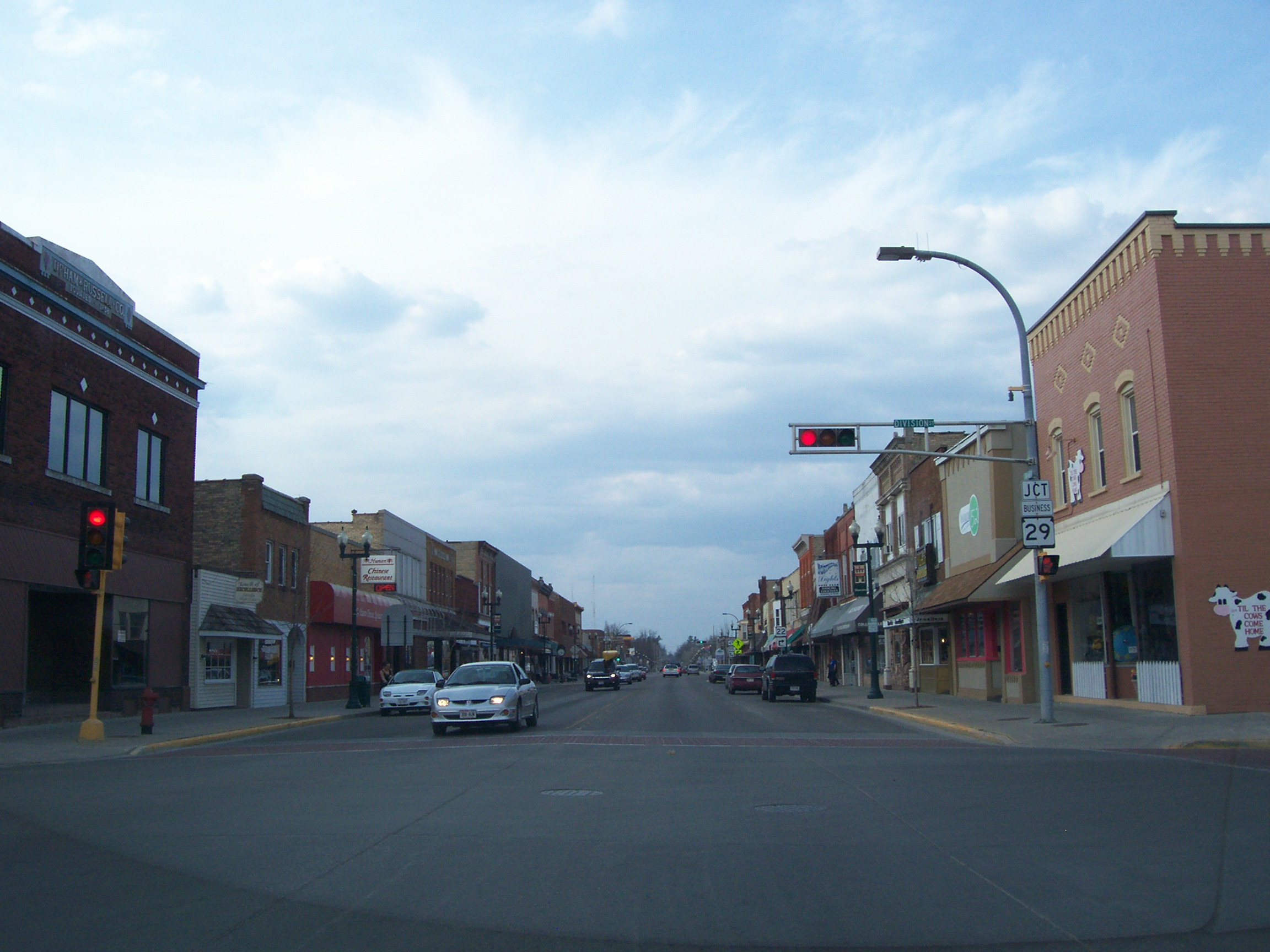
- Main Street

- Location of Shawano in Shawano County, Wisconsin

- Location within Wisconsin Location within the United States
- Coordinates: 44°46′36″N 88°36′7″W
- Country: United States
- State: Wisconsin
- County: Shawano

Area
  - Total: 6.93 sq mi (17.96 km^{2})
  - Land: 6.70 sq mi (17.35 km^{2})
  - Water: 0.24 sq mi (0.62 km^{2})
- Elevation: 817 ft (249 m)

Population (2020)
  - Total: 9,243
  - Density: 1,334.1/sq mi (515.09/km^{2})
- Time zone: UTC-6 (Central (CST))
  - Summer (DST): UTC-5 (CDT)
- Zip Code: 54166
- Area codes: 715 & 534
- FIPS code: 55-72925
- GNIS feature ID: 1573978
- Website: cityofshawano.com

Shawano (/ˈʃɔːnoʊ/ SHAW-noh) is a city and the county seat of Shawano County, Wisconsin, United States. The population was 9,243 at the 2020 census.

== Geography ==
According to the United States Census Bureau, the city has a total area of 6.67 square miles (17.28 km^{2}), of which 6.57 square miles (17.02 km^{2}) is land and 0.10 square miles (0.26 km^{2}) is water.

=== Climate ===
Climate data for Shawano, Wisconsin (1991–2020 normals, extremes 1893–present)
Month	Jan	Feb	Mar	Apr	May	Jun	Jul	Aug	Sep	Oct	Nov	Dec	Year
Record high °F (°C)	53 (12)	71 (22)	82 (28)	93 (34)	95 (35)	101 (38)	109 (43)	104 (40)	100 (38)	88 (31)	75 (24)	62 (17)	109 (43)
Mean daily maximum °F (°C)	24.1 (−4.4)	28.4 (−2.0)	40.3 (4.6)	54.1 (12.3)	67.3 (19.6)	76.8 (24.9)	81.2 (27.3)	79.1 (26.2)	71.5 (21.9)	57.5 (14.2)	42.2 (5.7)	29.4 (−1.4)	54.3 (12.4)
Daily mean °F (°C)	15.1 (−9.4)	18.4 (−7.6)	29.9 (−1.2)	43.0 (6.1)	55.8 (13.2)	65.6 (18.7)	69.7 (20.9)	67.7 (19.8)	59.7 (15.4)	46.8 (8.2)	33.7 (0.9)	21.5 (−5.8)	43.9 (6.6)
Mean daily minimum °F (°C)	6.2 (−14.3)	8.5 (−13.1)	19.6 (−6.9)	32.0 (0.0)	44.2 (6.8)	54.3 (12.4)	58.1 (14.5)	56.3 (13.5)	47.9 (8.8)	36.2 (2.3)	25.2 (−3.8)	13.6 (−10.2)	33.5 (0.8)
Record low °F (°C)	−35 (−37)	−39 (−39)	−28 (−33)	2 (−17)	19 (−7)	28 (−2)	33 (1)	32 (0)	20 (−7)	6 (−14)	−14 (−26)	−26 (−32)	−39 (−39)
Average precipitation inches (mm)	1.30 (33)	1.07 (27)	1.82 (46)	3.03 (77)	3.80 (97)	4.34 (110)	3.89 (99)	3.60 (91)	3.63 (92)	3.03 (77)	2.05 (52)	1.58 (40)	33.14 (842)
Average snowfall inches (cm)	11.8 (30)	10.8 (27)	7.4 (19)	4.3 (11)	0.0 (0.0)	0.0 (0.0)	0.0 (0.0)	0.0 (0.0)	0.0 (0.0)	0.3 (0.76)	3.5 (8.9)	9.8 (25)	47.9 (122)
Average precipitation days (≥ 0.01 in)	9.6	6.6	8.3	10.4	12.3	11.8	11.1	10.2	10.1	10.4	8.4	9.2	118.4
Average snowy days (≥ 0.1 in)	7.8	5.5	4.2	1.8	0.0	0.0	0.0	0.0	0.0	0.3	2.3	6.5	28.4
Source: NOAA

== Demographics ==
Historical population
Census	Pop.	Note	%±
1880	890		—
1890	1,505		69.1%
1900	1,863		23.8%
1910	2,923		56.9%
1920	3,544		21.2%
1930	4,188		18.2%
1940	5,565		32.9%
1950	5,894		5.9%
1960	6,013		2.0%
1970	6,488		7.9%
1980	7,013		8.1%
1990	7,598		8.3%
2000	8,298		9.2%
2010	9,305		12.1%
2020	9,243		−0.7%
U.S. Decennial Census

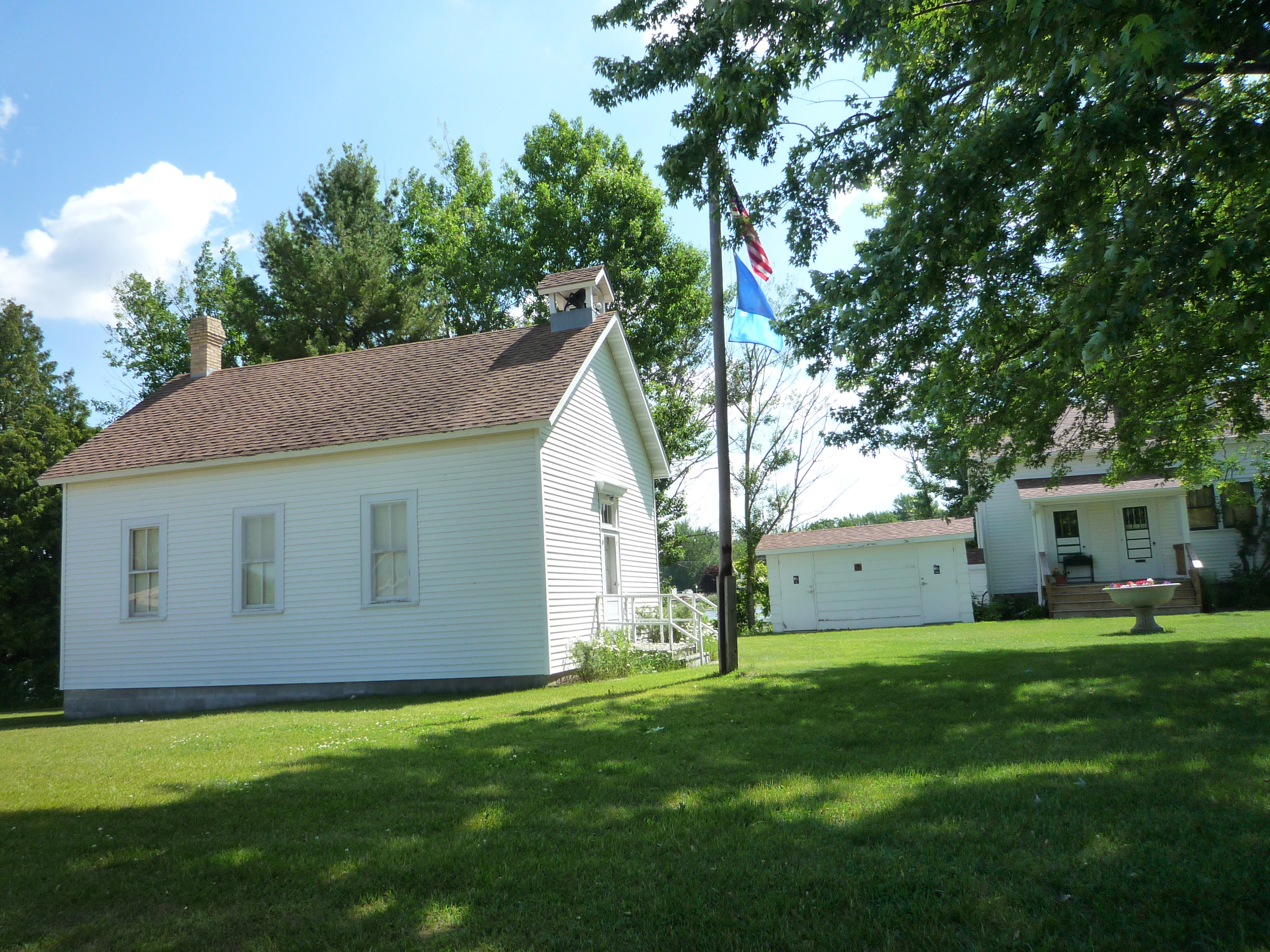
The Shawano County Historical Society operates a museum with several restored, historic buildings.

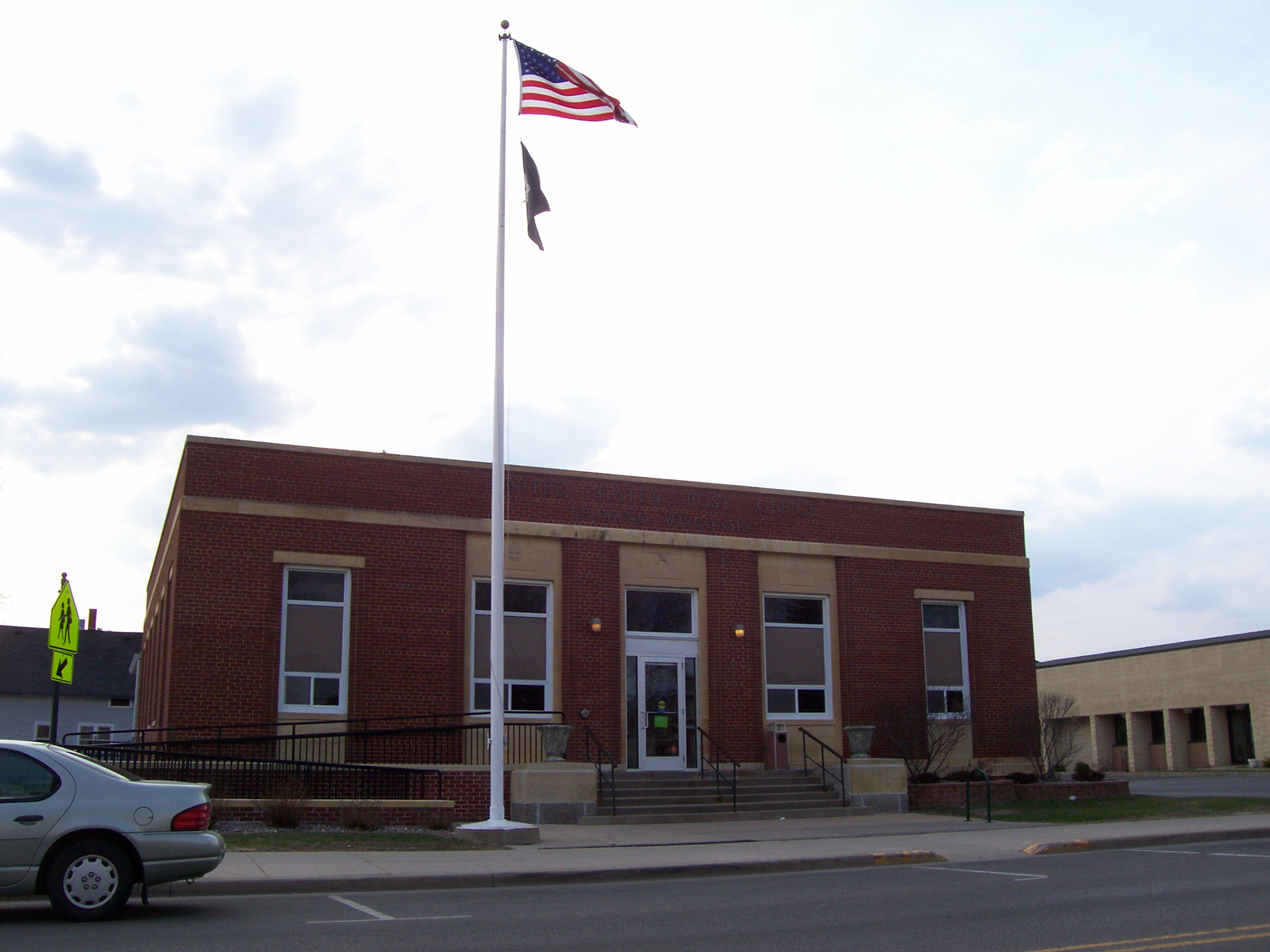
Shawano Post Office, listed on the National Register of Historic Places

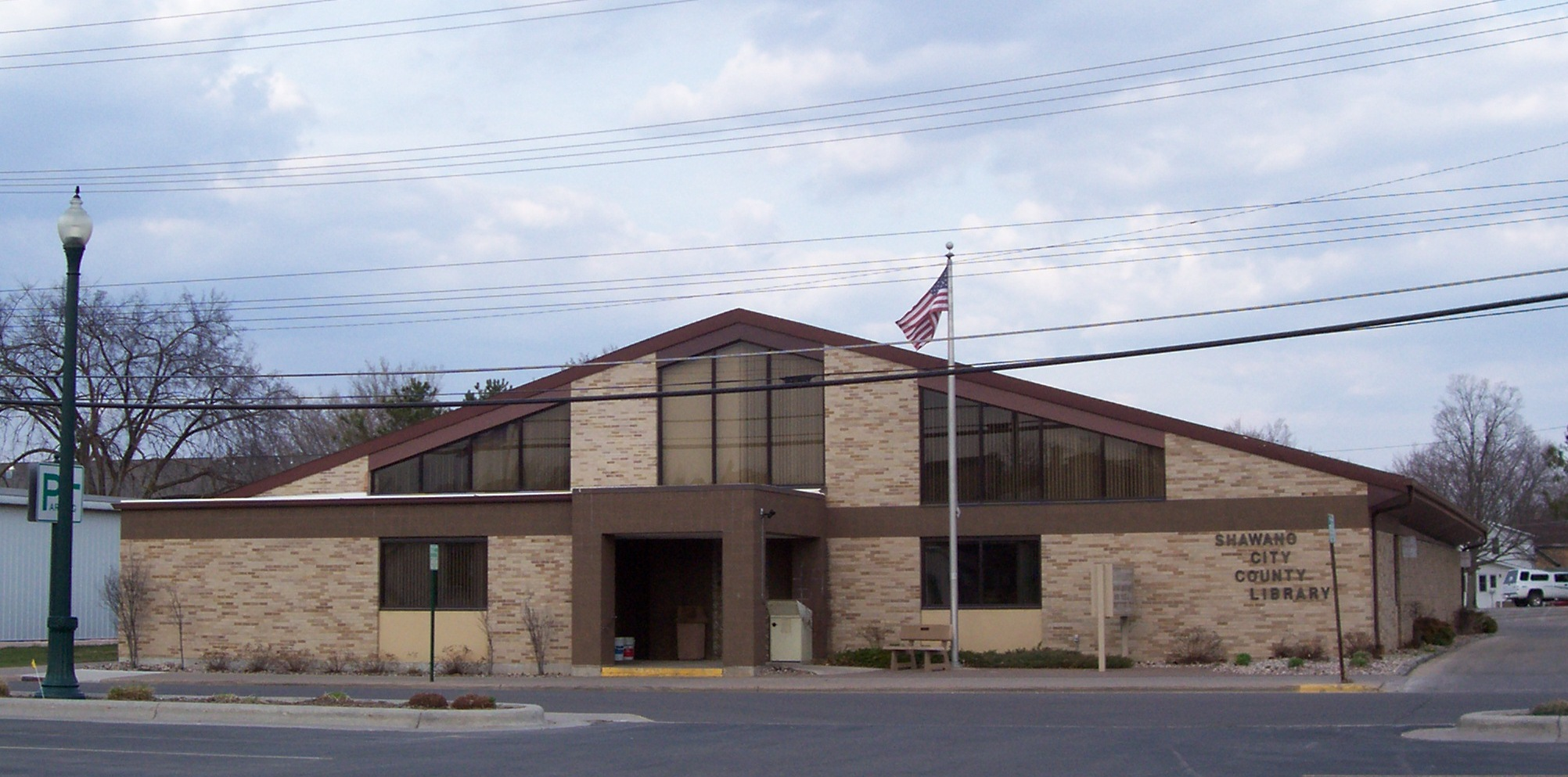
Shawano City County Library

=== 2010 census ===
As of the census of 2010, there were 9,305 people, 3,960 households, and 2,299 families residing in the city. The population density was 1,416.3 inhabitants per square mile (546.8/km^{2}). There were 4,309 housing units at an average density of 655.9 per square mile (253.2/km^{2}). The racial makeup of the city was 82.4% White, 0.7% African American, 12.3% Native American, 0.4% Asian, 0.1% Pacific Islander, 1.2% from other races, and 2.8% from two or more races. Hispanic or Latino people of any race were 3.1% of the population.

There were 3,960 households, of which 28.9% had children under the age of 18 living with them, 40.7% were married couples living together, 12.6% had a female householder with no husband present, 4.8% had a male householder with no wife present, and 41.9% were non-families. 35.6% of all households were made up of individuals, and 17% had someone living alone who was 65 years of age or older. The average household size was 2.24 and the average family size was 2.89.

The median age in the city was 39.8 years. 23% of residents were under the age of 18; 8.1% were between the ages of 18 and 24; 25.3% were from 25 to 44; 23.8% were from 45 to 64; and 19.8% were 65 years of age or older. The gender makeup of the city was 47.2% male and 52.8% female.

=== 2000 census ===
As of the census of 2000, there were 8,298 people, 3,432 households, and 2,076 families residing in the city. The population density was 1,389.9 per square mile (536.6/km^{2}). There were 3,587 housing units at an average density of 600.8 per square mile (232.0/km^{2}). The racial makeup of the city was 89.03% White, 0.33% African American, 7.88% Native American, 0.54% Asian, 0.12% Pacific Islander, 0.55% from other races, and 1.54% from two or more races. Hispanic or Latino people of any race were 1.61% of the population.

There were 3,432 households, out of which 29.0% had children under the age of 18 living with them, 45.8% were married couples living together, 11.2% had a female householder with no husband present, and 39.5% were non-families. 34.7% of all households were made up of individuals, and 18.2% had someone living alone who was 65 years of age or older. The average household size was 2.27 and the average family size was 2.91.

24.0% of the population was under the age of 18, 7.9% from 18 to 24, 27.7% from 25 to 44, 19.8% from 45 to 64, and 20.5% who were 65 years of age or older. The median age was 38 years. For every 100 females, there were 91.0 males. For every 100 females age 18 and over, there were 86.9 males.

The median income for a household in the city was $31,546, and the median income for a family was $41,241. Males had a median income of $30,709 versus $19,905 for females. The per capita income for the city was $17,380. About 8.9% of families and 9.9% of the population were below the poverty line, including 11.4% of those under age 18 and 12.1% of those age 65 or over.

== Economy ==
The Wisconsin Towns Association has its headquarters in Shawano.

Shawano is a member of Shawano County Economic Progress, a countywide economic development organization.

== Infrastructure ==
=== Major highways ===
WIS 22 travels north to Gillett and south to Clintonville.
WIS 29 Eastbound WIS 29 routes to Green Bay. Westbound, WIS 29 routes to Wausau.
WIS 47 travels north concurrent with WIS 55 to Keshena and south 8 miles (13 km) east on WIS 29 at Bonduel to Appleton.
WIS 55 travels south concurrent with WIS 29 before it splits off towards Seymour 16 miles (26 km) to the east.

=== Airport ===
The city and county jointly operate the Shawano Municipal Airport (KEZS), which is located on Shawano Lake.

== Education ==
Public education is provided by the Shawano School District. The District includes Hillcrest Primary School, Olga Brener Intermediate School, Shawano Community Middle School, and Shawano Community High School.

== Notable people ==
- Douglas Anderson — Wisconsin State Representative; born in Shawano
- George E. Beedle — Wisconsin State Representative; born in Shawano
- Rama Behera — founder of fundamentalist Christian-like cult Samanta Roy Institute of Science and Technology
- Henry Albert Brauer — Wisconsin State Representative; lived in Shawano
- Robert W. Cone — Army general; lived in Shawano
- Walter J. Dolan — Wisconsin State Representative; lived in Shawano
- Billie Frechette — partner and accomplice of John Dillinger; lived in Shawano
- George Grimmer — Wisconsin State Senator; lived in Shawano
- William Horvath — Wisconsin State Representative and conservationist; born in Shawano
- Frank W. Humphrey — Wisconsin State Representative; lived in Shawano
- John David Kast — Wisconsin State Representative; lived in Shawano
- Antone Kuckuk — Wisconsin State Senator, member of the Shawano School Board
- George W. Latta — Wisconsin State Representative and lawyer; lived in Shawano
- Daniel P. Leaf — U.S. Air Force lieutenant general, former Commander of United States Pacific Command
- Louis Leroy — MLB player; lived in Shawano
- Joseph McCarthy, lawyer in Shawano in the 1930s; circuit court judge
- Myron Hawley McCord — U.S. Representative; lived in Shawano
- Herman Naber — Wisconsin State Representative; lived in and was mayor of Shawano
- Dan Neumeier — MLB player; born in Shawano
- Daniel H. Pulcifer — Wisconsin State Representative, lived in and was mayor of Shawano
- Billy Reed — MLB player; born in Shawano
- Lee Remmel — NFL historian; born and raised in Shawano
- Michael J. Wallrich — Wisconsin State Representative; lived in and was mayor of Shawano
- King Weeman — Wisconsin State Representative; lived in and was mayor of Shawano
- Otto Oscar Wiegand — Wisconsin State Representative; lived in Shawano
