= List of United States federal courthouses =

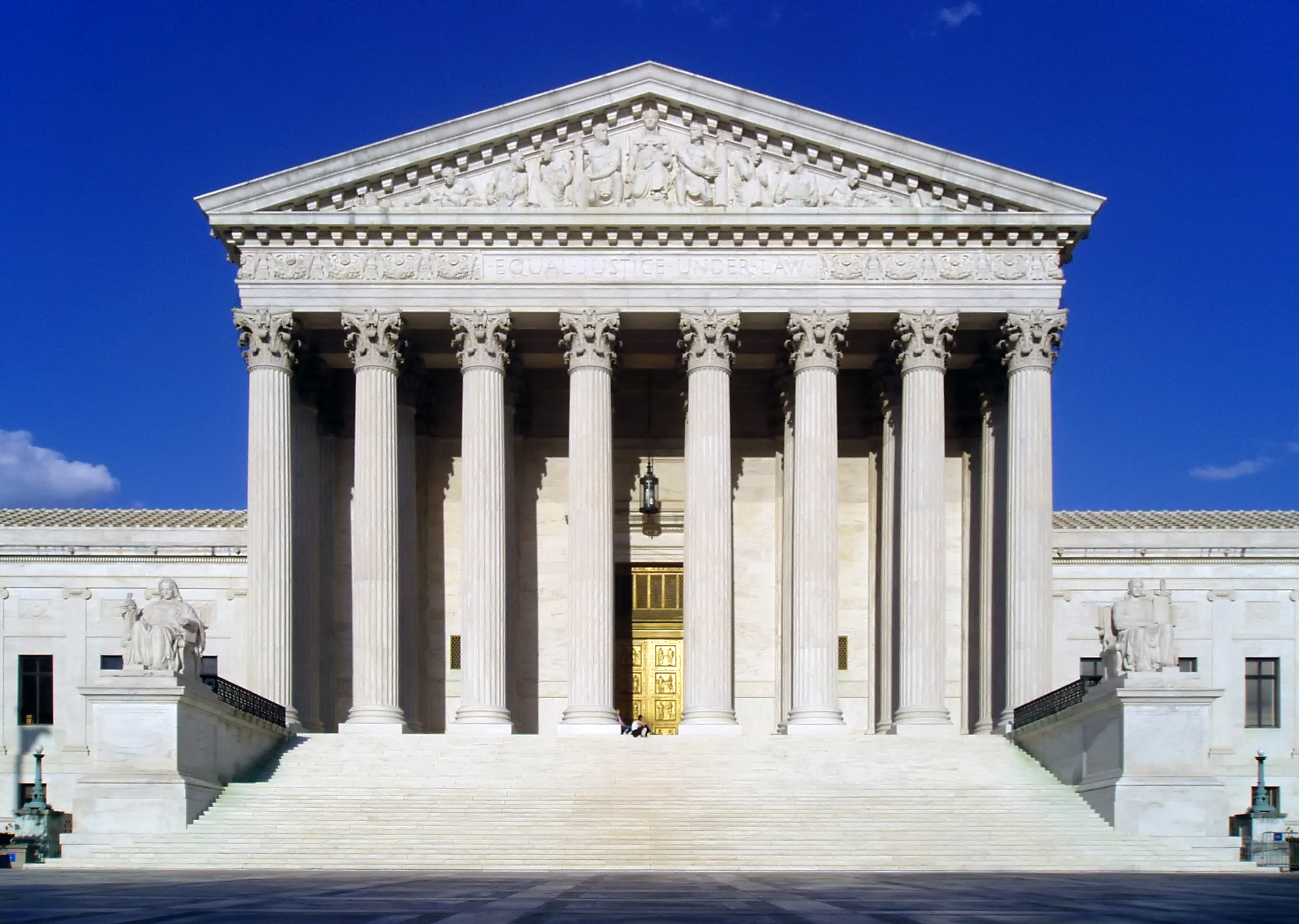

Following is a list of United States federal courthouses, which will comprise all courthouses currently or formerly in use for the housing of United States federal courts. Each entry indicates the name of the building along with an image, if available, its location and the jurisdiction it covers, the dates during which it was used for each such jurisdiction, and, if applicable the person for whom it was named, and the date of renaming. Dates of use will not necessarily correspond with the dates of construction or demolition of a building, as pre-existing structures may be adapted or court use, and former court buildings may later be put to other uses. Also, the official name of the building may be changed at some point after its use as a federal court building has been initiated.

The list contains approximately 687 courthouses.

Map of Courts of Appeals and District Courts

== Alabama ==
Courthouse	City	Image	Street address	Jurisdiction	First used	Last used	Notes
Federal Building and U.S. Courthouse^{†}	Anniston		1129 Noble Street	N.D. Ala.	1906	present	
U.S. Court House & Post Office	Birmingham		Second Avenue North and 18th Street	N.D. Ala.	1893	1921	Razed in the early 20th century.
Robert S. Vance Federal Building & U.S. Courthouse^{†}	Birmingham		1800 5th Avenue North	N.D. Ala.	1921	present	Named after Court of Appeals judge Robert Smith Vance in 1990.
Hugo L. Black U.S. Courthouse	Birmingham		1729 Fifth Avenue North	N.D. Ala.	1987	present	Named after U.S. Senator and Supreme Court Justice Hugo Black in 1987.
Seybourn H. Lynne U.S. Courthouse & Post Office	Decatur		400 Well Street	N.D. Ala.	1961	present	Named after District Court judge Seybourn Harris Lynne in 1995.
Federal Building and U.S. Courthouse^{†}	Dothan		100 West Troy Street	M.D. Ala.	1911	present	
John McKinley Federal Building	Florence		210 North Seminary Street	N.D. Ala.	1913	present	Named after U.S. Senator and Supreme Court Justice John McKinley in 1998.
Federal Building & U.S. Courthouse^{†}	Gadsden		600 Broad Street	N.D. Ala.	1910	2012	
U.S. Courthouse and Post Office	Huntsville		Corner of Eustis Avenue and Greene Street	N.D. Ala.	1890	1936	Razed in 1954.
U.S. Courthouse and Post Office^{†}	Huntsville		101 East Holmes Avenue	N.D. Ala.	1936	present	
U.S. Custom House & Post Office	Mobile		107 St. Francis St	S.D. Ala.	1856	1934	Razed in 1963; now the site of the RSA–BankTrust Building.
John Archibald Campbell U.S. Courthouse	Mobile		113 St. Joseph Street	U. S. Bankruptcy	1934	present	Named after Supreme Court Justice John Archibald Campbell in 1981. Housed the Southern District until 2020, then the Bankruptcy court since 2020.
Mobile Federal Courthouse	Mobile		155 St. Joseph Street	S.D. Ala.	2020	present	
U.S. Court House & Post Office	Montgomery		2 South Lawrence Street	M.D. Ala. 5th Circuit	1885	1933	
Frank M. Johnson, Jr. Federal Bldg & U.S. Courthouse^{†}	Montgomery		15 Lee Street	M.D. Ala.	1932	present	Named after District Court judge Frank Minis Johnson in 1992.
G.W. Andrews Federal Building and U.S. Courthouse^{†}	Opelika		701 Avenue A	M.D. Ala.	1918	present	Named after U.S. Rep. George W. Andrews in 1968.
Federal Building & U.S. Courthouse^{†}	Selma		908 Alabama Avenue	S.D. Ala.	1909	present	
U.S. Post Office & Court House	Tuscaloosa		2201 University Boulevard	M.D. Ala.	1910	1968	
Federal Building & U.S. Courthouse	Tuscaloosa		1118 Greensboro Avenue	N.D. Ala.	c. 1968	2011	
U.S. Federal Building and Courthouse	Tuscaloosa		2005 University Boulevard	N.D. Ala.	2011	present	

== Alaska ==
Courthouse	City	Image	Street address	Jurisdiction	First used	Last used	Notes
U.S. Federal Building and Courthouse†	Anchorage		605 West Fourth Avenue	D. Alaska	1940	present	Most court functions moved to the newly built federal building on West Seventh Avenue ca. 1979. The U.S. Bankruptcy Court has occupied the building's courtrooms since that time.
James M. Fitzgerald United States Courthouse	Anchorage		222 West Seventh Avenue	D. Alaska	ca. 1979	present	Named after James Martin Fitzgerald.
U.S. Post Office and Courthouse†	Fairbanks		250 Cushman Street	D. Alaska	1958	1977	Now privately owned.
U.S. Federal Building and Courthouse	Fairbanks		101 Twelfth Avenue	D. Alaska	1977	present	
Federal and Territorial Building	Juneau		120 Fourth Street	D. Alaska	1931	ca. 1960	
Hurff Ackerman Saunders Federal Building and Robert Boochever US Courthouse	Juneau		709 West Ninth Street	D. Alaska	1966	present	Named after Hurff Ackerman Saunders and Robert Boochever
Ketchikan Federal Building†	Ketchikan		648 Mission Street	D. Alaska	1938	present	
U.S. Post Office & Court House	Nome		?	D. Alaska	1938	1958	Now privately owned.
Post Office Building	Nome		113 Front Street	D. Alaska	?	present	
U.S. Post Office and Courthouse†	Sitka		100 Lincoln Street	D. Alaska	1938	?	

== Arizona ==
Courthouse	City	Image	Street address	Jurisdiction	First used	Last used	Notes
U.S. Post Office & Courthouse†	Globe		101 South Hill Street	D. Ariz.	1928	?	Still in use as a post office.
U.S. Post Office & Courthouse	Phoenix		1st Avenue and Van Buren Street	D. Ariz.	1913	1961	Razed in 1961.
Federal Building	Phoenix		230 North First Avenue	D. Ariz.	1961	present	
Sandra Day O'Connor U.S. Courthouse	Phoenix		401 West Washington Street	D. Ariz.	2000	present	Named after Supreme Court justice Sandra Day O'Connor.
U.S. Post Office & Courthouse^{†}	Prescott		101 West Goodwin Street	D. Ariz.	1931	present	
James A. Walsh U.S. Courthouse	Tucson		55 East Broadway	D. Ariz.	1930	present	Named after District Court judge James Augustine Walsh in 1985.
Evo A. DeConcini U.S. Courthouse	Tucson		405 West Congress Street	D. Ariz.	2000	present	Named after Arizona Supreme Court justice Evo Anton DeConcini.
United States Court House	Yuma		315 West 19th Street	D. Ariz.	?	2014	
John M. Roll U.S. Courthouse	Yuma		98 West 1st Street Yuma, AZ	D. Ariz.	2014	present	Named after District Chief judge John Roll.

== Arkansas ==
Courthouse	City	Image	Street address	Jurisdiction	First used	Last used	Named for
U.S. Post Office and Courthouse	Batesville		368 East Main Street	E.D. Ark.	1907	?	Now the Independence County Library.
U.S. Post Office & Courthouse	El Dorado		101 South Jackson Avenue	W.D. Ark.	1931	present	
John Paul Hammerschmidt Federal Building	Fayetteville		35 East Mountain Street	W.D. Ark.	?	present	Named after U.S. Rep. John Paul Hammerschmidt.
U.S. Post Office & Court House	Fort Smith		Rogers Avenue and Sixth Street	W.D. Ark.	1897	1936	Building completed in 1889; razed in 1936.
Judge Isaac C. Parker Federal Building^{†}	Fort Smith		30 South 6th Street	W.D. Ark.	1937	present	Named after District Court judge Isaac C. Parker.
U.S. Post Office & Courthouse	Harrison		201 North Main Street	W.D. Ark.	1906	?	Now in use by Boone County.
J. Smith Henley Federal Building	Harrison		402 North Walnut Street	W.D. Ark.	?	present	Named after District Court and Court of Appeals judge Jesse Smith Henley. (2001)
U.S. Post Office & Court House	Helena		Northeast corner Porter & Cherry Sts.	E.D. Ark.	1893	1961	Fate of building unknown.
Jacob Trieber Federal Building, U.S. Post Office, and U.S. Court House	Helena–West Helena		617 Walnut Street	E.D. Ark.	1961	present	Named after Jacob Trieber.
U.S. Courthouse^{†}	Hot Springs		100 Reserve Street	W.D. Ark.	?	present	
E.C. Gathings Federal Building and United States Courthouse	Jonesboro		615 South Main Street	E.D. Ark.	1960	present	Named after Arkansas Congressman Ezekiel C. Gathings.
Old U.S. Post Office & Courthouse^{†}	Little Rock		300 West 2nd Street	E.D. Ark. W.D. Ark.	1881	present	
Richard Sheppard Arnold U.S. Courthouse†	Little Rock		600 West Capitol Avenue	E.D. Ark.	1932	present	Named after Court of Appeals judge Richard S. Arnold in 2003.
George Howard Jr. Federal Building & U.S. Courthouse	Pine Bluff		100 East 8th Avenue	E.D. Ark.	1966	present	Named after District Court judge George Howard Jr.
U.S. Courthouse and Post Office	Texarkana		State Line, Olive, Fifth, Elm	E.D. Tex. W.D. Ark.	1892	1930	Straddled the line between Texas and Arkansas, with facilities for both jurisdictions. Razed in 1930.
U.S. Post Office & Courthouse^{†}	Texarkana		500 North State Line Avenue	E.D. Tex. W.D. Ark.	1933	present	This building straddles the state line between Arkansas and Texas; it is the only U.S. federal building to occupy two states.

== California ==
Courthouse	City	Image	Street address	Jurisdiction	First used	Last used	Notes
U.S. Courthouse	Bakersfield		510 19th Street	E.D. Cal.	2012	present	
U.S. Courthouse	El Centro		2003 West Adams Avenue	S.D. Cal.	?	present	
U.S. Post Office & Courthouse^{†}	Eureka		514 H Street	N.D. Cal.	1912	c. 2014	Still in use as a post office.
U.S. Post Office & Court House	Fresno		Van Ness Avenue and Tulare Street	S.D. Cal.	1908	1940	Razed in 1940.
U.S. Post Office & Court House	Fresno		2309 Tulare Street	S.D. Cal.	1940	1966	Still in use as a post office and by the Fresno Unified School District.
Robert E. Coyle U.S. Courthouse	Fresno		2500 Tulare Street	E.D. Cal.	2005	present	Named after District Court Judge Robert Everett Coyle.
U.S. Post Office & Courthouse	Los Angeles		Main and Winston Streets	S.D. Cal.	1892	1901	Court was at Tajo Building at Broadway & 1st from 1901 to 1910
U.S. Post Office & Courthouse	Los Angeles		312 North Spring Street	S.D. Cal.	1910	1937	Razed, new courthouse built on same site
U.S. Courthouse^{†}	Los Angeles		312 North Spring Street	S.D. Cal. C.D. Cal.	1940	present	
Edward R. Roybal Federal Building & U.S. Courthouse	Los Angeles		255 East Temple Street	S.D. Cal. C.D. Cal.	1992	present	Named after U.S. Rep. Edward R. Roybal.
U.S. Courthouse	Los Angeles		350 West 1st Street	C.D. Cal.	2016	present	
U.S. Courthouse	McKinleyville		3140 Boeing Avenue	N.D. Cal.	c. 2014	present	
Ronald V. Dellums Federal Building	Oakland		1301 Clay Street	N.D. Cal.	1994	present	Named after U.S. Rep. and Oakland Mayor Ron Dellums.
Richard H. Chambers U.S. Court of Appeals^{†}	Pasadena		125 South Grand Avenue	9th Cir.	1985	present	Formerly the Vista del Arroyo Hotel. Named after Court of Appeals Judge Richard H. Chambers in 1992.
U.S. District Court	Redding		2986 Bechelli Lane	E.D. Cal.	?	present	
George E. Brown, Jr. Federal Building and U.S. Courthouse (U.S. District Court and U.S. Bankruptcy Court)	Riverside		3420–3470 12th Street	C.D. Cal.	?	present	
U.S. Post Office and Courthouse	Sacramento		7th and K Streets	N.D. Cal.	1919	1933	Demolished in 1966.
U.S. Post Office and Courthouse^{†}	Sacramento		801 I Street	N.D. Cal. E.D. Cal.	1933	?	Still used by federal offices.
Robert T. Matsui U.S. Courthouse	Sacramento		501 I Street	E.D. Cal.	1999	present	Named after U.S. Rep. Robert T. Matsui.
Jacob Weinberger U.S. Courthouse^{†}	San Diego		325 West F Street	S.D. Cal.	1913	present	Named after U.S. District Court Judge Jacob Weinberger in 1986.
Edward J. Schwartz Courthouse	San Diego		221 West Broadway	S.D. Cal.	1975	present	Named after District Court Judge Edward Joseph Schwartz.
James M. Carter and Judith N. Keep U.S. Courthouse	San Diego		333 West Broadway	S.D. Cal.	2013	present	Named after District Court Judges James M. Carter and Judith N. Keep.
U.S. Courthouse	San Francisco			D. Cal. N.D. Cal.	1879	1905	Appraiser's Building on Sansome Street. Razed in 1940.
James R. Browning U.S. Courthouse	San Francisco		95 7th Street	N.D. Cal. 9th Cir.	1905	present	Named after Court of Appeals Judge James R. Browning in 2004.
Phillip Burton Federal Building and U.S. Courthouse	San Francisco		450 Golden Gate Avenue	N.D. Cal.	1959	present	Named after U.S. Rep. Phillip Burton in 1983.
Robert F. Peckham Federal Building	San Jose		280 South 1st Street	N.D. Cal.	1980s	present	Named after District Court Judge Robert Francis Peckham.
Ronald Reagan Federal Building and Courthouse	Santa Ana		411 West Fourth Street	C.D. Cal.	1999	present	Named after President Ronald Reagan in 1992.
U.S. Bankruptcy Court	Santa Barbara		1415 State Street	C.D. Cal.	?	present	
U.S. Bankruptcy Court	Santa Rosa		99 South E Street	N.D. Cal.	?	present	
U.S. Bankruptcy Court	Woodland Hills		21041 Burbank Boulevard	C.D. Cal.	?	present	
U.S. District Court	Yosemite		9004 Castle Cliff Court	E.D. Cal.	1987	present	

== Colorado ==
Courthouse	City	Image	Street address	Jurisdiction	First used	Last used	Notes
U.S. Post Office and Federal Courthouse†	Colorado Springs		201 East Pikes Peak Avenue	D. Col.	?	?	
U.S. Court House and Post Office	Denver		?	D. Col.	1892	1916	Razed in the early 1960s.
Alfred A. Arraj U.S. Courthouse	Denver		901 19th Street	D. Col.	?	present	Named after District Court judge Alfred A. Arraj.
U.S. Customhouse†	Denver		721 19th Street	D. Col.	1931	present	
Byron Rogers Federal Building and U.S. Courthouse†	Denver		1961 Stout Street	D. Col.	1965	present	Named after U.S. Rep. Byron G. Rogers in 1984.
Byron White U.S. Courthouse†	Denver		1823 Stout Street	10th Cir.	?	present	Named after Supreme Court Justice Byron White in 1994.
U.S. Post Office	Durango		1060 Main Avenue	D. Col.	1929	?	
Wayne N. Aspinall Federal Building†	Grand Junction		400 Rood Avenue	D. Col.	1918	present	Named after U.S. Rep. Wayne N. Aspinall in 1972.
Pueblo Federal Building†	Pueblo		421 North Main Street	D. Col.	1898	2002	
U.S. Post Office and Land Office†	Sterling		306 Poplar Street	D. Col.	1931	?	

== Connecticut ==
Courthouse	City	Image	Street address	Jurisdiction	First used	Last used	Notes
Brien McMahon Federal Building	Bridgeport		915 Lafayette Boulevard	D. Conn.	?	present	Named after U.S. Sen. Brien McMahon.
U.S. Post Office & Customhouse	Hartford		?	D. Conn.	1882	1933	Razed in 1934.
William R. Cotter Federal Building	Hartford		135 High Street	D. Conn.	1933	1963	Now used for other federal government offices. Named after U.S. Rep. William R. Cotter in 1982.
Abraham A. Ribicoff Federal Building	Hartford		450 Main Street	D. Conn.	1963	present	Named after Conn. Gov. and U.S. Rep. Abraham A. Ribicoff in 1980.
Richard C. Lee U.S. Courthouse	New Haven		141 Church Street	D. Conn.	1919	present	Named after New Haven mayor Richard C. Lee in 1998.
U.S. Post Office & Customhouse	New Haven		Church & Gregson Streets	D.Conn.	1860	1919	Razed in 1952.
John S. Monagan Federal Building	Waterbury		14 Cottage Place	D. Conn.	?	present	

== Delaware ==
Courthouse	City	Image	Street address	Jurisdiction	First used	Last used	Notes
Old Court House†	New Castle		211 Delaware Street	D. Del.	1789	1855	Now in use as a museum, mayoral office, and shops.
Old Customshouse†	Wilmington		516 North King Street	D. Del.	1856	1897	Now used by Wilmington University.
U.S. Post Office and Courthouse	Wilmington		Ninth St. between Shipley & Orange Sts.	D. Del.	1897	1937	Sold in 1940.
U.S. Post Office, Court House, and Custom House†	Wilmington		1100 North Market Street	D. Del.	1937	1973	Now privately owned.
J. Caleb Boggs Federal Building	Wilmington		844 King Street	D. Del.	?	present	Named after U.S. Senator J. Caleb Boggs.

== District of Columbia ==
Courthouse	Image	Street address	Jurisdiction	First used	Last used	Notes
District of Columbia City Hall^{††}		451 Indiana Avenue NW	Various	1823	1952	Now in use by local government.
U.S. Supreme Court Bldg^{††}		1 First Street NE	U.S. Supreme Court (nationwide)	1935	present	
Howard T. Markey National Courts Bldg		717 Madison Place NW	Fed. Cir. (nationwide); Fed. Claims (nationwide)	1967	present	Named after Court of Appeals judge Howard Thomas Markey. Formerly known as the National Courts Building.
U.S. Tax Court Bldg		400 Second Street NW	U.S. Tax Court (nationwide)	1972	present	
E. Barrett Prettyman U.S. Courthouse		333 Constitution Avenue NW	D.D.C. D.C. Cir.	1952	present	Named after Court of Appeals judge E. Barrett Prettyman.
U.S. Court of Appeals for the Armed Forces bldg		450 E Street NW	C.A.A.F. (nationwide); D.C. Cir. (former)	1910	present	Utilized by the D.C. Cir. until it became the location of the C.A.A.F. in 1952.

== Florida ==
Courthouse	City	Image	Street address	Jurisdiction	Dates of use	Named for
U.S. Post Office, Custom House, and Courthouse	Fernandina		401 Centre Street	S.D. Fla. M.D. Fla.	1912–1962; 1962–? Still in use as a post office.	n/a
U.S. Federal Bldg & Courthouse	Fort Lauderdale		299 East Broward Boulevard, Suite 312	S.D. Fla.	1979–present	n/a
U.S. Courthouse & Federal Building	Fort Myers		2110 First Street	M.D. Fla.	1998–present	n/a
George Whitehurst U.S. Courthouse	Fort Myers		2301 First Street	S.D. Fla. M.D. Fla.	1952–1962; 1962–1998; Construction completed in 1933; now used as an arts center.	George William Whitehurst
Old Fort Pierce Post Office	Fort Pierce		500 Orange Avenue	S.D. Fla.	1935–?	n/a
U.S. Courthouse^{†}	Gainesville		25 Southeast 2nd Place	N.D. Fla.	1911–1964; Now in use as the Hippodrome State Theatre.	n/a
U.S. Courthouse	Gainesville		401 SE First Avenue, Room 243	N.D. Fla.	1964–present	n/a
U.S. Post Office & Courthouse	Jacksonville		Hogan & Forsyth Sts.	S.D. Fla.	1895–1933; Razed in 1948	n/a
Ed Austin Building	Jacksonville		311 West Monroe Street	S.D. Fla. M.D. Fla. 5th Cir.	1933–1962; 1962–2003; 1948–1981; Now offices of the State Attorney General	Ed Austin
Bryan Simpson United States Courthouse	Jacksonville		300 North Hogan Street	M.D. Fla. Also a satellite office of the 11th Cir.	2002–present	Court of Appeals Judge John Milton Bryan Simpson
Old Post Office & Customshouse^{†}	Key West		281 Front Street	S.D. Fla.	1891–1932; Now the Key West Museum of Art & History.	n/a
Sidney M. Aronovitz U.S. Courthouse	Key West		301 Simonton Street	S.D. Fla.	1933–present	District Court judge Sidney M. Aronovitz (2009)
U.S. Post Office & Courthouse	Marianna		4396 Lafayette Street	N.D. Fla.	1928–? Still in use as a post office.	n/a
U.S. Post Office, Courthouse, & Customhouse	Miami		100 NE 1st Avenue	S.D. Fla.	1914–1932; Now privately owned.	n/a
David W. Dyer Federal Building & U.S. Courthouse	Miami		300 Northeast 1st Avenue	S.D. Fla.	1933–2008	District court judge David W. Dyer
C. Clyde Atkins U.S. Courthouse	Miami		301 North Miami Avenue	S.D. Fla.	?–present	C. Clyde Atkins
Wilkie D. Ferguson, Jr. U.S. Courthouse	Miami		400 North Miami Avenue	S.D. Fla.	2005–present	Wilkie D. Ferguson
James L. King Federal Justice Building	Miami		99 Northeast 4th Street	S.D. Fla.	1996–present	James Lawrence King
Golden-Collum Memorial Federal Building & U.S. Courthouse	Ocala		207 NW Second Street	M.D. Fla.	?–present	Harold Golden and William Edward Collum, the first and last service members from Ocala to die in the Vietnam War
U.S. Post Office & Courthouse	Ocala		?	S.D. Fla.	1909–1956; Razed ca. 1956	n/a
U.S. Post Office & Court House	Orlando		51 East Jefferson Street	S.D. Fla. M.D. Fla.	1941–1962; 1962-1974; Still in use as a post office.	n/a
George C. Young Federal Building & Courthouse	Orlando		80 North Hughey Avenue	M.D. Fla.	1975–present	George C. Young
U.S. Courthouse	Orlando		401 West Central Boulevard	M.D. Fla.	2007–present	n/a
U.S. Courthouse	Panama City		30 West Government Street	N.D. Fla.	?–present	n/a
U.S. Courthouse^{†}	Pensacola		223 South Palafox Street	N.D. Fla.	1887–1939; Now owned by Escambia County	n/a
Winston E. Arnow Federal Building†	Pensacola		100 North Palafox Street	N.D. Fla.	1939–present Now in use by the U.S. Bankruptcy Court for the Northern District of Florida.	District Court judge Winston E. Arnow (2004)
U.S. Courthouse	Pensacola		1 North Palafox Street	N.D. Fla.	1998–present	n/a
Government House†	Saint Augustine		48 King Street	D. Fla. N.D. Fla	1845–1847; 1847-1868; Original building from the Spanish colonial period; now the Government House Museum.	n/a
U.S. Courthouse	Tallahassee		Southeast corner McCarthy & Adams Sts.	N.D. Fla.	1895–1936; Razed in 1964	n/a
U.S. Courthouse	Tallahassee		110 East Park Avenue	N.D. Fla.	1936–? Now in use by the U.S. Bankruptcy Court for the Northern District of Florida.	n/a
Joseph Hatchett United States Courthouse	Tallahassee		111 North Adams Street	N.D. Fla.	1999–present	n/a
U.S. Courthouse Building & Downtown Postal Station^{†}	Tampa		601 North Florida Avenue	S.D. Fla. M.D. Fla.	1905–1962; 1962-2001; Now Meridian Hotel	n/a
Sam M. Gibbons U.S. Courthouse	Tampa		801 North Florida Avenue	M.D. Fla.	1996–present	U.S. Rep. Sam Gibbons
Paul G. Rogers Federal Building & Courthouse	West Palm Beach		701 Clematis Street	S.D. Fla.	1973–present	Paul Grant Rogers

== Georgia ==
Courthouse	City	Image	Street address	Jurisdiction	Dates of use	Named for
C. B. King U.S. Courthouse	Albany		201 West Broad Avenue	M.D. Ga.	?-present	Pioneering African American lawyer C. B. King
U.S. Post Office and Courthouse^{†}	Athens		?	S.D. Ga. M.D. Ga.	1906-1926; 1926-1942	n/a
U.S. Post Office and Courthouse	Athens		115 Hancock Avenue	M.D. Ga.	1942-present	n/a
Elbert P. Tuttle U.S. Court of Appeals Bldg^{††}	Atlanta		56 Forsyth Street NW	11th Cir.	?-present	Court of Appeals judge Elbert Tuttle (1989)
Richard B. Russell Federal Building	Atlanta		75 Spring Street SW	N.D. Ga.	?-present	Governor and U.S. Senator Richard Russell, Jr.
U.S. Post Office and Courthouse	Augusta		500 Ford Street	S.D. Ga.	?-present	n/a
Frank M. Scarlett Federal Building	Brunswick		805 Gloucester Street	S.D. Ga.	?-present	District Court judge Francis Muir Scarlett
U.S. Post Office and Courthouse^{†}	Columbus		120 12th Street	M.D. Ga.	1933-present	n/a
J. Roy Rowland Federal Courthouse	Dublin		100 North Franklin Street	S.D. Ga.	1935-present	U.S. Rep. J. Roy Rowland
United States Courthouse & Federal Building	Gainesville		121 Spring Street SE Room 201	N.D. Ga.	?-present	n/a
William Augustus Bootle Federal Building & U.S. Courthouse	Macon		475 Mulberry Street	M.D. Ga.	?-present	District Court judge William Augustus Bootle (1998)
Lewis R. Morgan Federal Building & U.S. Courthouse	Newnan		18 Greenville Street	N.D. Ga.	?-present	Court of Appeals judge Lewis Render Morgan
United States Courthouse	Rome		600 East First Street	N.D. Ga.	?-present	n/a
Tomochichi Federal Building & U.S. Courthouse^{†}	Savannah		125 Bull Street	S.D. Ga.	1899-present	Creek leader Tomochichi (2005)
Prince H. Preston Federal Building	Statesboro		52 Main Street	S.D. Ga.	?-present	U.S. Rep. Prince Hulon Preston, Jr.
U.S. Courthouse & Post Office	Thomasville		404 North Broad Street	M.D. Ga.	1962-present	n/a
U.S. Post Office and Courthouse	Valdosta		401 N. Patterson Street	M.D. Ga.	?-present	n/a
U.S. Courthouse	Waycross		601 Tebeau Street	S.D. Ga.	1926-1975; Built in 1913; currently vacant.	n/a

== Hawaii ==
Courthouse	City	Image	Street address	Jurisdiction	Dates of use	Named for
Federal Building, U.S. Post Office and Courthouse^{†}	Hilo		154 Waianuenue Avenue	D. Haw.	1959–1979	n/a
King David Kalakaua Building^{†}	Honolulu		335 Merchant Street	D. Haw.	1959–1978	King Kalākaua (2003; renamed after end of federal use)
Prince Kūhiō Federal Building	Honolulu		300 Ala Moana Boulevard	D. Haw.	1977–present	Prince Jonah Kūhiō Kalanianaʻole

== Idaho ==
Courthouse	City	Image	Street address	Jurisdiction	Dates of use	Named for
Federal Bldg & U.S. Courthouse	Boise		750 West Bannock Street	D. Idaho	1905–1967; Still a U.S. Post Office and federal offices. Location of Bankruptcy Court through 1995.	n/a
James A. McClure Federal Bldg & U.S. Courthouse^{†}	Boise		550 West Fort Street	D. Idaho	1967–present	U.S. Senator James A. McClure
Coeur d'Alene Federal Building^{†}	Coeur d'Alene		221 North 4th Street	D. Idaho	1928–2009; Now Kootenai County Juvenile Justice Center.	n/a
U.S. Courthouse	Coeur d'Alene		6450 North Mineral Drive	D. Idaho	2009–present	n/a
Moscow City Hall^{†} (Formerly Moscow Post Office & Courthouse and Moscow Federal Building)	Moscow		206 East 3rd Street	D. Idaho	1911–1973; Now Moscow City Hall.	n/a
Moscow Federal Building	Moscow		220 East 5th Street	D. Idaho	1973–present Purchased by local hospital in 2012.	n/a
Pocatello Federal Building^{†}	Pocatello		150 South Arthur Avenue	D. Idaho	1916–1977; Now private office space.	n/a
U.S. Courthouse	Pocatello		801 East Sherman Street	D. Idaho	1999–present	n/a

== Illinois ==
Courthouse	City	Image	Street address	Jurisdiction	Dates of use	Named for
William L. Beatty Federal Building & U.S. Courthouse	Alton		501 Belle Street	S.D. Ill.	?	William L. Beatty (2002)
Federal Building and U.S. Courthouse	Benton		301 West Main Street	E.D. Ill. S.D. Ill.	1959–1978; 1978–present	n/a
U.S. Custom House & Post Office†	Cairo		1400 Washington Avenue	S.D. Ill. E.D. Ill.	1872–1905; 1905–1942; Now the Cairo Custom House Museum.	n/a
U.S. Post Office & Courthouse	Cairo		1500 Washington Avenue	E.D. Ill. S.D. Ill.	1942–1978; 1978–? Still in use as a post office	n/a
U.S. Custom House, Court House, & Post Office	Chicago		?	N.D. Ill. 7th Cir.	1879–1894; 1891–1894; Razed in 1896; replaced by Chicago Federal Building at same site.	n/a
U.S. Appellate Court Bldg	Chicago		1212 N. Lake Shore Drive	7th Cir.	1938–1965; Fate of building unknown.	n/a
Chicago Federal Building	Chicago		218 S. Dearborn Street	N.D. Ill.	1905–1965; Structure replaced by the Kluczynski Federal Building; court relocated.	n/a
Everett McKinley Dirksen U.S. Courthouse	Chicago		219 South Dearborn Street	N.D. Ill. 7th Cir.	1964–present	U.S. Senator Everett Dirksen
U.S. Post Office & Courthouse	Danville		?	S.D. Ill. E.D. Ill.	1894–1905; 1905–1911; Razed in 1911 or 1912.	n/a
U.S. Post Office & Courthouse†	Danville		201 North Vermilion Street	E.D. Ill.	1911–1978; Now in use by the U.S. Bankruptcy Court, C.D. Ill.	n/a
Melvin Price Federal Bldg & U.S. Courthouse†	East Saint Louis		750 Missouri Avenue	E.D. Ill. S.D. Ill.	1910–1978; 1978–present	U.S. Rep. Charles Melvin Price (1990)
U.S. Post Office	Freeport		103 North Chicago Avenue	N.D. Ill.	1905–1977; Still in use as a post office.	n/a
U.S. Post Office & Court House	Peoria		?	N.D. Ill. S.D. Ill.	1889–1905; 1905–1937; Razed in 1937.	n/a
Central District of Illinois Courthouse†	Peoria		100 N.E. Monroe	E.D. Ill. C.D. Ill.	1938–1978; 1978-present	n/a
U.S. Post Office & Court House^{†}	Quincy		?	S.D. Ill. C.D. Ill.	1887–1978; 1978–? Still in use as a post office.	n/a
U.S. Post Office & Court House	Rock Island		211 19th Street	S.D. Ill. C.D. Ill.	1957–1978; 1978–present	n/a
Winnebago County Juvenile Justice Center	Rockford		211 South Court Street	N.D. Ill.	?–2011	n/a
Stanley J. Roszkowski U.S. Courthouse	Rockford		327 South Church Street	N.D. Ill.	2011–present	District Court judge Stanley Julian Roszkowski
U.S. Court House & Post Office	Springfield		?	S.D. Ill.	1869–1929; Razed in 1929.	n/a
Paul Findley Federal Bldg & U.S. Courthouse	Springfield		600 East Monroe Street	S.D. Ill. C.D. Ill.	1930–1978; 1978-present	U.S. Rep. Paul Findley
U.S. Courthouse	Urbana		201 South Vine Street	C.D. Ill.	1994–present	n/a

== Indiana ==
Courthouse	City	Image	Street address	Jurisdiction	Dates of use	Named for
U.S. Custom House and Post Office†	Evansville		100 Northwest 2nd Street	D. Ind. S.D. Ind.	1879–1928; 1928–1969; Now privately owned.	n/a
Winfield K. Denton Federal Building & U.S. Courthouse	Evansville		101 Northwest Martin Luther King Boulevard	S.D. Ind.	?–present	U.S. Representative Winfield K. Denton
U.S. Court House & Post Office	Fort Wayne		Southeast corner Berry & Clinton Sts.	D. Ind. N.D. Ind.	1889–1928; 1928–1932; Razed in the 1930s.	n/a
E. Ross Adair Federal Building & U.S. Courthouse^{†}	Fort Wayne		1300 South Harrison Street	N.D. Ind.	1932–present	E. Ross Adair
U.S. Post Office & Court House	Hammond		507 East State Street	D. Ind. N.D. Ind.	1907–1928; 1928–2002; Still standing but not presently in use.	n/a
U.S. Courthouse	Hammond		5400 Federal Plaza	N.D. Ind.	2002–present	n/a
U.S. Court House and Post Office	Indianapolis		Market & Pennsylvania Streets	D. Ind.	1861–1905; Razed in 1963.	n/a
Birch Bayh Federal Building & U.S. Courthouse^{†}	Indianapolis		46 East Ohio Street	S.D. Ind.	1905–present	U.S. Sen. Birch Bayh (2003)
Charles A. Halleck Federal Building	Lafayette		230 North Fourth Street	N.D. Ind.	1931–present	Charles A. Halleck
U.S. Court House & Post Office	New Albany		?	D. Ind. S.D. Ind.	1879–1928; 1928-1966; Building razed.	n/a
Lee H. Hamilton Federal Building & U.S. Courthouse	New Albany		121 West Spring Street	S.D. Ind.	1966–present	Congressman Lee H. Hamilton (2001)
Robert A. Grant Federal Building and U.S. Courthouse†	South Bend		204 South Main Street	N.D. Ind.	1933–present	District Court judge Robert A. Grant (1992)
Terre Haute Post Office and Federal Building†	Terre Haute		30 North 7th Street	S.D. Ind.	1935–2009	n/a
U.S. Courthouse	Terre Haute		921 Ohio Street	S.D. Ind.	2009–present	n/a

== Iowa ==
Courthouse	City	Image	Street address	Jurisdiction	Dates of use	Named for
U.S. Post Office & Court House	Cedar Rapids		305 2nd Avenue Southeast.	N.D. Iowa	1900–1908; Built in 1895; razed in 1908; successor courthouse built at same location.	n/a
U.S. Post Office & Court House^{†}	Cedar Rapids		305 2nd Avenue Southeast.	N.D. Iowa	1910–1933; Now owned by Linn County and renamed the Witwer Building.	n/a
U.S. Post Office & Court House	Cedar Rapids		101 1st Street Southeast	N.D. Iowa	1933–2012; Now used as the City Hall	n/a
U.S. Court House	Cedar Rapids		111 Seventh Avenue Southeast	N.D. Iowa	2012–present	n/a
U.S. Post Office & Court House	Council Bluffs		?	S.D. Iowa	1888–? Fate of building unknown.	n/a
U.S. Post Office & Court House	Council Bluffs		8 South 6th Street	S.D. Iowa	1959–present	n/a
U.S. Post Office & Court House†	Creston		222 Maple Street	S.D. Iowa	1903–? Now owned by the state.	n/a
U.S. Post Office	Davenport		131 East 4th Street	S.D. Iowa	1896–1932; Razed in 1932; successor courthouse built at same location.	n/a
Davenport U.S. Courthouse^{†}	Davenport		131 East 4th Street	S.D. Iowa	1933–present	n/a
U.S. Court House & Post Office	Des Moines		Fifth Street & Court Avenue	D. Iowa; S.D. Iowa	1871–1882; 1882–1929; Razed in 1968.	n/a
Des Moines U.S. Courthouse^{†}	Des Moines		123 East Walnut Street	S.D. Iowa	1929–present	n/a
U.S. Bankruptcy Court	Des Moines		110 East Court Avenue	S.D. Iowa	?–present	n/a
U.S. Custom House & Post Office	Dubuque		?	D. Iowa; N.D. Iowa	1866–1882; 1882–1934; Razed in 1947.	n/a
U.S. Post Office & Courthouse^{†}	Dubuque		350 West 6th Street	N.D. Iowa	1934–present	n/a
U.S. Post Office	Fort Dodge		?	N.D. Iowa	1895–1911; Fate of building unknown.	n/a
U.S. Post Office	Fort Dodge		?	N.D. Iowa	1911–? Fate of building unknown.	n/a
U.S. Post Office & Court House^{†}	Keokuk		25 North 7th Street	S.D. Iowa	1890–1957; Now the Lee County Courthouse.	n/a
U.S. Post Office & Courthouse	Mason City		211 North Delaware Avenue	N.D. Iowa	1932–? Still in use as a post office.	n/a
U.S. Post Office & Court House^{†}	Ottumwa		105 3rd Street East	S.D. Iowa	1912–? Now Ottumwa City Hall.	n/a
U.S. Post Office & Court House	Sioux City		405 6th Street	N.D. Iowa	1897–1932; Partially demolished in 1995; remnants incorporated into new city hall.	n/a
Federal Building & U.S. Court House^{†}	Sioux City		316 6th Street	N.D. Iowa	1934–present	n/a
U.S. Post Office & Court House	Waterloo		?	N.D. Iowa	1905–1937; Razed in 1937.	n/a
U.S. Post Office & Court House	Waterloo		415 Commercial Street	N.D. Iowa	1938–? Now the Waterloo Public Library.	n/a

== Kansas ==
Courthouse	City	Image	Street address	Jurisdiction	Dates of use	Named for
U.S. Court House & Post Office	Fort Scott		First Street & Scott Avenue	D. Kan.	1890–1936; Razed in 1946	n/a
U.S. Post Office & Court House	Fort Scott		120 South National Avenue	D. Kan.	1936–? Still in use as a post office.	n/a
U.S. Post Office	Kansas City		7th & Minnesota	D. Kan. United States Circuit Court	1902–1959; 1948–1959; Razed in 1962.	n/a
Wyandotte County Court Services Building	Kansas City		812 North 7th Street	D. Kan.	1959–1994; Now in use by Wyandotte County.	n/a
Robert J. Dole U.S. Court House	Kansas City		500 State Avenue	D. Kan.	1994–present	U.S. Sen. Bob Dole
U.S. Court House & Post Office	Leavenworth		Northeast corner Shawnee & 4th Sts.	D. Kan. United States Circuit Court	1890–1859; 1890–1912; Razed ca. 1959.	n/a
U.S. Post Office & Court House	Salina		7th & Iron Sts.	D. Kan.	1896–1938; Razed in 1962.	n/a
U.S. Post Office & Court House	Salina		211 West Iron Avenue	D. Kan.	1938–? Now the Smoky Hill Museum.	n/a
U.S. Court House & Post Office	Topeka		5th & Kansas Ave.	D. Kan. United States Circuit Court	1884–1932; 1884–1912; Razed in 1933.	n/a
U.S. Post Office and Court House^{†}	Topeka		424 Kansas Street	D. Kan.	1933–1977; Still in use as a post office.	n/a
Frank Carlson Federal Building & U.S. Courthouse	Topeka		444 Southeast Quincy Street	D. Kan.	1977–present	Governor Frank Carlson
U.S. Post Office & Court House	Wichita		Market & William Sts.	D. Kan.	1890–1932; Razed in 1936.	n/a
U.S. Post Office and Federal Building†	Wichita		401 North Market Street	D. Kan.	1932–present	n/a

== Kentucky ==
Courthouse	City	Image	Street address	Jurisdiction	Dates of use	Named for
Carl D. Perkins Federal Building	Ashland		1405 Greenup Avenue	E.D. Ky.	1984–present	U.S. Rep. Carl D. Perkins
William H. Natcher Federal Bldg & U.S. Courthouse	Bowling Green		241 East Main Avenue	W.D. Ky.	1912–present	U.S. Rep. William Huston Natcher (1994)
U.S. Post Office & Court House	Catlettsburg		?	E.D. Ky.	1911–1984; Now privately owned.	n/a
U.S. Courthouse and Post Office	Covington		Between Scott Boulevard, Court Avenue, 3rd Street, and Park Place	E.D. Ky.	1876–1946; Demolished in 1968	n/a
Covington Post Office	Covington		700 Scott Boulevard	E.D. Ky.	1946–1999; Still used by the Post Office	n/a
U.S. District Court House	Covington		35 West 5th Street	E.D. Ky.	1999–present	n/a
Old U.S. Courthouse & Post Office	Frankfort		305 Wapping Street	D. Ky. E.D. Ky.	1887–1901; 1901–? Now in use as a public library.	n/a
John C. Watts Federal Building	Frankfort		330 Broadway	E.D. Ky.	?–present	U.S. Rep. John C. Watts
U.S. Post Office and Courthouse†	Jackson		359 Broadway Street	E.D. Ky.	1916–? Now used as apartments	n/a
U.S. Post Office & Court House†	Lexington		101 Barr Street	E.D. Ky.	1934–present	n/a
Federal Building-Courthouse†	London		300 South Main Street	E.D. Ky.	1911–present	n/a
U.S. Courthouse Annex	London		310 South Main Street	E.D. Ky.	2002–present	n/a
U.S. Customshouse and Post Office†	Louisville		300 West Liberty Street	D. Ky.	1858–1896	n/a
U.S. Post Office, Court House & Custom House	Louisville		4th & Chestnut Sts.	D. Ky. W.D. Ky.	1893–1901; 1901–1932; Razed in 1943.	n/a
Gene Snyder U.S. Courthouse†	Louisville		601 West Broadway	W.D. Ky.	1932–present	U.S. Rep. Gene Snyder (1986)
U.S. Post Office	Owensboro		?	D. Ky. W.D. Ky.	1889–1911; Demolished	n/a
U.S. District Court House†	Owensboro		423 Frederica Street	W.D. Ky.	1911–present	n/a
U.S. Post Office and Court House	Paducah		?	D. Ky. W.D. Ky.	1883–1938; Demolished	n/a
Federal Building & U.S. Courthouse	Paducah		501 Broadway	W.D. Ky.	1938–present	n/a
U.S. District Court House	Pikeville		110 Main Street	E.D. Ky.	1932–present	n/a
U.S. Post Office	Richmond		351 West Main Street	E.D. Ky.	1897–1912; Now used by the Kentucky District Court for Madison County.	n/a

== Louisiana ==
Courthouse	City	Image	Street address	Jurisdiction	Dates of use	Named for
U.S. Post Office & Court House	Alexandria		Johnson Street, between 3rd & 4th	W.D.La.	1896–1933; Razed in 1933	n/a
U.S. Post Office & Court House^{†}	Alexandria		515 Murray Street	W.D.La.	1933–present	n/a
U.S. Post Office & Court House†	Baton Rouge		355 North Boulevard	E.D.La.	1897–1933; Now the City Club of Baton Rouge.	n/a
U.S. Post Office & Court House^{†}	Baton Rouge		707 Florida Street	E.D.La. M.D.La.	1933–present	n/a
Russell B. Long Federal Building and Courthouse	Baton Rouge		777 Florida Street	M.D.La.	1993–present	Russell B. Long
U.S. Post Office & Court House	Lake Charles		501 Broad Street	W.D.La.	1912–c. 1960; Now privately owned.	n/a
U.S. Post Office & Federal Bldg	Lake Charles		921 Moss Street	?	1960–1994; Still in use as a post office.	n/a
Edwin F. Hunter, Jr. U.S. Courthouse and Federal Building	Lake Charles		611 Broad Street	W.D.La.	?–present	District Court judge Edwin F. Hunter, Jr.
Federal Building and U.S. Courthouse	Lafayette		705 Jefferson Street	W.D.La.	1958–?	n/a
John M. Shaw U.S. Courthouse	Lafayette		800 Lafayette Street	W.D.La.	?–present	John Malach Shaw
U.S. Court House & Post Office	Monroe		St. John & Grammond Sts.	W.D.La.	1892–1933; Razed in 1965.	n/a
U.S. Post Office & Court House	Monroe		201 Jackson Street	W.D.La.	1934–present	n/a
U.S. Custom House†	New Orleans		423 Canal Street	E.D.La. 5th Cir.	1860–1915; 1891–1915 2008–2020 Audubon Insectarium (An Audubon Nature Institute museum). Now offices of U.S. Department of Homeland Security.	n/a
John Minor Wisdom U.S. Courthouse†	New Orleans		600 Camp Street	E.D.La. 5th Cir.	1915–1963; 1915–present	Court of Appeals judge John Minor Wisdom (1994)
Hale Boggs Federal Building and U.S. Courthouse	New Orleans		500 Poydras Street	E.D.La.	1962–present	Hale Boggs
U.S. Court House & Post Office†	Opelousas		162 South Court Street	W.D.La.	1891–1967; Now privately owned.	n/a
U.S. Post Office & Court House	Shreveport		NE corner Texas & Marshall	W.D.La.	1887–1910; Razed in 1910.	n/a
U.S. Post Office & Court House^{†}	Shreveport		424 Texas Street	W.D.La.	1912–1974; Now a branch of the Shreve Memorial Library.	n/a
Joe D. Waggoner Federal Building	Shreveport		500 Fannin Street	W.D.La.	1974–1994	Joe Waggonner
Tom Stagg Federal Building and U.S. Courthouse	Shreveport		300 Fannin Street	W.D.La.	1993–present	Tom Stagg

== Maine ==
Courthouse	City	Image	Street address	Jurisdiction	Dates of use	Named for
Olde Federal Building†	Augusta		295 Water Street	D. Maine	1886–? Still houses a Post Office	n/a
U.S. Custom House and Post Office	Bangor		Central Street Bridge & State Street	D. Maine	1855–1911; Destroyed in the Great Fire of 1911.	n/a
U.S. Post Office	Bangor		73 Harlow Street	D. Maine	1915–1968; Currently in use as Bangor City Hall.	n/a
Margaret Chase Smith Federal Building and United States Courthouse	Bangor		202 Harlow Street	D. Maine	1968–present	Senator Margaret Chase Smith
U.S. Court House and Post Office	Portland	U.S. Custom House, Portland, ME - 1873-1905	Middle & Exchange Sts.	D. Maine	1873–1905; Razed in 1965	n/a
Edward T. Gignoux United States Courthouse†	Portland		156 Federal Street	D. Maine	1911–present	District Court judge Edward Thaxter Gignoux

== Maryland ==
Courthouse	City	Image	Street address	Jurisdiction	Dates of use	Named for
U.S. Courthouse (Masonic Hall)	Baltimore		St. Paul Street and Courthouse Lane	D. Md.	1822–1864; Razed in 1895	n/a
U.S. Courthouse	Baltimore		North St. and Fayette St.	D. Md.	1865–c. 1890; Razed in 1930	n/a
U.S. Post Office & Courthouse	Baltimore		101–125 Calvert St.	D. Md.	1890–1930; Razed in 1930.	n/a
U.S. Post Office & Courthouse	Baltimore		111 N. Calvert Street	D. Md.	1932–1976; Now in use by the Baltimore city courts and known as Courthouse East.	n/a
Edward A. Garmatz U.S. Court House	Baltimore		101 West Lombard Street	D. Md.	1976–present	Edward Garmatz
U.S. Courthouse and Post Office†	Cumberland		Frederick Street	D. Md.	1904–1933; Now in use by the city and known as the Public Safety Building.	n/a
U.S. Post Office & Courthouse now the William Donald Schaefer Building	Cumberland		3 Pershing Street	D. Md.	1933–? Now in use by the Maryland state courts.	Governor William Donald Schaefer
U.S. Courthouse	Greenbelt		6500 Cherrywood Lane	D. Md.	1994–present	n/a
Maude R. Toulson Federal Building†	Salisbury		129 East Main Street	D. Md.	?–present	Maude R. Toulson

== Massachusetts ==
Courthouse	City	Image	Street address	Jurisdiction	Dates of use	Named for
U.S. Post Office and Subtreasury	Boston		5 Post Office Square	D. Mass.	1883–1929; Razed in 1929	n/a
John W. McCormack U.S. Post Office and Courthouse†	Boston		5 Post Office Square	D. Mass.	1933–present	John William McCormack
John Joseph Moakley U.S. Courthouse	Boston		1 Courthouse Way	D. Mass., 1st Cir.	1999–present	U.S. Rep. Joe Moakley
U.S. Post Office and Court House	Springfield		436 Dwight Street	D. Mass.	1932–1983; Now in use by the state government.	n/a
1550 Main	Springfield		1550 Main Street	D. Mass.	1981–2008	n/a
U.S. Court House	Springfield		300 State Street	D. Mass.	2008–present	n/a
U.S. States Post Office	Worcester		?	D. Mass.	1926–1930; Razed ca. 1930	n/a
Harold D. Donohue Federal Building and United States Courthouse†	Worcester		595 Main Street	D. Mass.	1932–present	U.S. Rep. Harold Donohue (1987)

== Michigan ==
Courthouse	City	Image	Street address	Jurisdiction	Dates of use	Named for
Federal Building	Ann Arbor		200 East Liberty Street	E.D. Mich.	?–present	n/a
U.S. Court House, Post Office, and Custom House	Bay City		Washington Ave. between 3rd & 4th	E.D. Mich.	1893–1931; Razed in 1931.	n/a
U.S. Post Office Building	Bay City		1000 Washington Avenue	E.D. Mich.	1932–present	n/a
Custom House	Detroit		NW Corner of Griswold and Larned Streets	E.D. Mich.	1861–1897	n/a
Post Office, Courthouse and Custom House	Detroit		231 West Lafayette Boulevard	E.D. Mich.	1897–1934	n/a
Theodore Levin United States Courthouse	Detroit		231 West Lafayette Boulevard	E.D. Mich.	1934–present	District Court judge Theodore Levin
Federal Building and U.S. Courthouse†	Flint		600 Church Street	E.D. Mich.	?–present	n/a
U.S. Courthouse and Post Office	Grand Rapids		Ionia Street	W.D. Mich.	1879–1909; Demolished in 1909	n/a
Woodbridge N. Ferris Building†	Grand Rapids		17 Pearl Street Northwest	W.D. Mich.	1911–? Now used by the Kendall College of Art and Design	n/a
Gerald R. Ford Federal Building & U.S. Courthouse	Grand Rapids		110 Michigan Street Northwest	W.D. Mich.	1971–present	President Gerald Ford
Federal Bldg, U.S. Post Office & Courthouse†	Kalamazoo		410 West Michigan Avenue	W.D. Mich.	1939–present	n/a
Charles E. Chamberlain Federal Building & Post Office†	Lansing		315 West Allegan Street	W.D. Mich.	1934–present	U.S. Rep. Charles E. Chamberlain
U.S. Post Office and Courthouse	Marquette		202 West Washington Street	W.D. Mich.	1937–present	n/a
Federal Building†	Port Huron		526 Water Street	E.D. Mich.	1877–present	n/a
United States Post Office†	Sault Sainte Marie		209 East Portage Avenue	W.D. Mich.	1912–1941; Now being converted to the City Hall.	n/a

== Minnesota ==
Courthouse	City	Image	Street address	Jurisdiction	Dates of use	Named for
U.S. Court House, Custom House, & Post Office	Duluth		?	D. Minn	1894–c.1929 Razed in 1929 or 1930.	n/a
Gerald W. Heaney Federal Building, U.S. Courthouse & Custom House^{†}	Duluth		515 West First Street	D. Minn	1930–present	Court of Appeals judge Gerald Heaney (2007)
Edward J. Devitt U.S. Courthouse and Federal Building†	Fergus Falls		118 South Mill Street	D. Minn.	1904–present	Edward Devitt
Federal Courthouse and Post Office^{†}	Mankato		South Second and East Jackson Streets	D. Minn	1896–?	n/a
Federal Office Building & Custom House	Minneapolis		3rd Street & Marquette Avenue	D. Minn	1890–c.1961 Razed in 1961.	n/a
U.S. Court House & Federal Office Building	Minneapolis		100–116 South 4th Street	D. Minn	Construction completed 1960. Now Hennepin County Family Justice Center.	n/a
Diana E. Murphy U.S. Courthouse	Minneapolis		300 South Fourth Street	D. Minn	1997–present	Diana E. Murphy
Federal Court House & Post Office^{†}	Moorhead		521 Main Avenue	D. Minn	1915–? Now the Rourke Art Museum.	n/a
U.S. Post Office, Court House, & Custom House^{†}	Saint Paul		75 West Fifth Street	D. Minn	1902–1960; Now the Landmark Center, a cultural center containing museums.	n/a
Warren E. Burger Federal Building & U.S. Courthouse	Saint Paul		316 Robert Street North	D. Minn	1966–present	Chief Justice Warren E. Burger
U.S. Courthouse & Post Office	Winona		4th and Main Streets	D. Minn.	1891–1963; Demolished.	n/a

== Mississippi ==
Courthouse	City	Image	Street address	Jurisdiction	Dates of use	Named for
U.S. Post Office and Court House^{†}	Aberdeen		201 W. Commerce St.	N.D. Miss.	1888–1974; Now the Monroe County Chancery Court.	n/a
Thomas G. Abernethy Federal Building	Aberdeen		301 West Commerce Street	N.D. Miss.	1971–present	U.S. Rep. Thomas Abernethy
U.S. Post Office, Court House, & Custom House†	Biloxi		140 Lameuse Street	S.D. Miss.	1908–1959; Now Biloxi City Hall.	n/a
Federal Building and Post Office	Biloxi		135 Main Street	S.D. Miss.	1959–? Still in use as a Post Office	n/a
U.S. Post Office	Clarksdale		?	N.D. Miss.	1916–1964; Razed in 1968.	n/a
Federal Building	Clarksdale		236 Sharkey Avenue	N.D. Miss.	1964–1997; Still in use by the Post Office and other government offices	n/a
Federal Building	Greenville		305 Main Street	N.D. Miss.	1960–present	n/a
Dan M. Russell Jr. Federal Bldg & U.S. Courthouse	Gulfport		2012 15th Street	S.D. Miss.	2003–present	District Court judge Dan Monroe Russell, Jr.
U.S. Court House†	Hattiesburg		200 West Pine Street	S.D. Miss.	1939–? Completed in 1910; now the Hattiesburg Municipal Court	n/a
William M. Colmer Federal Building & U.S. Courthouse	Hattiesburg		701 Main Street	S.D. Miss.	?–present	U.S. Rep. William M. Colmer
U.S. Court House & Post Office	Jackson		Capital & West streets	S.D. Miss.	1885–1933; Demolished in 1933	n/a
James Eastland Federal Building	Jackson		245 East Capitol Street	S.D. Miss. 5th Cir.	1934–2011	U.S. Sen. James Eastland (1984)
Thad Cochran U.S. Courthouse	Jackson		501 East Court Street	S.D. Miss.	2011–present	U.S. Sen. Thad Cochran
U.S. Post Office & Courthouse	Meridian		8th Street and 22nd Avenue	S.D. Miss.	1898–1933; Razed in the 1950s.	n/a
U.S. Post Office & Courthouse^{†}	Meridian		2100 9th Street	S.D. Miss.	1933–2012	n/a
U.S. Courthouse†	Natchez		109 Pearl Street	S.D. Miss.	2007–present Built in 1853	n/a
U.S. Court House & Post Office	Oxford		107 Courthouse Square	N.D. Miss.	1887–ca. 1974; Now Oxford City Hall.	n/a
Federal Building, Post Office, and Courthouse	Oxford		911 Jackson Avenue East	N.D. Miss.	1973–present	n/a
U.S. Court House, Post Office & Custom House	Vicksburg		1400 Walnut Street	S.D. Miss.	1892–1937; Now in use by the Mississippi River Commission.	n/a
U.S. Post Office & Court House	Vicksburg		820 Crawford Street	S.D. Miss.	1937–? Now privately owned.	n/a

== Missouri ==
Courthouse	City	Image	Street address	Jurisdiction	Dates of use	Named for
U.S. Post Office	Cape Girardeau		339 Broadway Street	E.D. Mo.	1910–1967; Demolished in 1967.	n/a
Federal Building and U.S. Courthouse	Cape Girardeau		339 Broadway Street	E.D. Mo.	1967–2008; Now privately owned.	n/a
Rush Hudson Limbaugh, Sr. U.S. Courthouse	Cape Girardeau		599 Independence Street	E.D. Mo.	2008–present	Attorney Rush Limbaugh Sr. (2007)
U.S. Post Office & Courthouse	Chillicothe		450 Locust Street	W.D. Mo.	1917–1962; Now the Livingston County Library.	n/a
U.S. Post Office†	Hannibal		600 Broadway	E.D. Mo.	1888–1960	n/a
Federal Building, Post Office, and Court House	Hannibal		801 Broadway	E.D. Mo.	1966–present	n/a
U.S. Court House & Post Office	Jefferson City		High Street	W.D. Mo.	1889–1934; Razed in 1972.	
U.S. Post Office & Court House	Jefferson City		131 West High Street	W.D. Mo.	1934–2011; Still in use as Post Office.	n/a
Christopher S. Bond U.S. Courthouse	Jefferson City		80 Lafayette Street	W.D. Mo.	2011–present	U.S. Senator Kit Bond
Durward G. Hall Federal Building & U.S. Courthouse	Joplin		302 South Joplin Avenue	W.D. Mo.	1904–1999; Now a public office building.	U.S. Rep. Durward Gorham Hall
U.S. Post Office & Court House	Kansas City		909 Walnut Street	W.D. Mo.	1885–1900; Razed in 1930.	n/a
U.S. Post Office & Court House	Kansas City		811 Grand Boulevard	W.D. Mo.	1900–1938; Razed in 1938.	n/a
U.S. Courthouse & Post Office†	Kansas City		811 Grand Boulevard	W.D. Mo.	1939–1998; Converted to apartments.	n/a
Richard Bolling Federal Building	Kansas City		601 East Twelfth Street	W.D. Mo.	1965–?	U.S. Rep. Richard Walker Bolling
Charles Evans Whittaker U.S. Courthouse	Kansas City		400 East 9th Street	W.D. Mo.	2000–present	Charles Evans Whittaker
U.S. Post Office	Saint Joseph		Southeast corner 8th & Edmond Sts.	W.D. Mo.	1891–1939; Razed in 1939.	n/a
U.S. Post Office and Court House	Saint Joseph		201 South 8th Street	W.D. Mo.	1940–1998; Still in use as a post office.	n/a
Old Courthouse	St. Louis		11 North 4th Street	D. Mo. E.D. Mo.	c. 1839–c. 1872	n/a
U.S. Customhouse and Post Office†	St. Louis		815 Olive Street	E.D. Mo. 8th Cir.	1873–1935; Still in use for other purposes.	n/a
Carnahan Courthouse	St. Louis		1114 Market Street	E.D. Mo. 8th Cir.	1935–2001; Now used by Missouri state courts.	Mel Carnahan
Thomas F. Eagleton U.S. Courthouse (Largest single courthouse in the U.S.)	St. Louis		111 South 10th Street	E.D. Mo.	2000–present	U.S. Senator Thomas Eagleton (1994)
U.S. Customhouse and Post Office†	Springfield		830 North Boonville Avenue	W.D. Mo.	1894–1938; Now in use by city agencies.	n/a
U.S. Post Office & Court House	Springfield		840 North Boonville Avenue	W.D. Mo.	1938–1988; Now Springfield City Hall.	n/a
U.S. Courthouse	Springfield		222 N. John Q. Hammons Parkway	W.D. Mo.	?–present	n/a

== Montana ==
Courthouse	City	Image	Street address	Jurisdiction	Dates of use	Named for
U.S. Post Office and Courthouse^{†}	Billings		2602 1st Avenue North	D.Mont	1914–?	n/a
Stillwater Building (Formerly known as the James F. Battin Federal Courthouse)	Billings		316 North 26th Street	D.Mont	1963–2012	n/a
James F. Battin Federal Courthouse	Billings		2601 2nd Avenue North	D.Mont	2012–present	U.S. Rep. and District Court judge James F. Battin (H.R. 158, 1996)
Mike Mansfield Federal Bldg & U.S. Courthouse†	Butte		400 North Main Street	D.Mont	1904–present	U.S. Sen. Mike Mansfield (2002)
U.S. Post Office†	Glasgow		605 2nd Avenue South	D.Mont	1939–? Still in use as a post office.	n/a
U.S. Post Office and Courthouse†	Great Falls		215 1st Avenue North	D.Mont	1912–2009; Still in use as a Post Office	n/a
Missouri River Courthouse	Great Falls		125 Central Avenue West	D.Mont	2009–present	Location; adjacent to the Missouri River
U.S. Post Office†	Havre		306 3rd Avenue	D.Mont	1932–?	n/a
Federal Building and United States Post Office	Helena		316 N. Park Avenue	D.Mont	1904–1970s Renamed City-County Building, still in use by the city and county governments.	n/a
Federal Building	Helena		301 S. Park Avenue	D.Mont	1970s–2002 Renamed Park Avenue Building, still in use by the State of Montana.	n/a
Paul G. Hatfield Courthouse	Helena		901 Front Street	D.Mont	2002–present	U.S. Senator and District Court judge Paul G. Hatfield
Federal Building, U.S. Post Office and Courthouse†	Missoula		200 East Broadway	D.Mont	1929–1974; Constructed in 1913. Still in use by various government agencies	n/a
Russell Smith Courthouse	Missoula		201 East Broadway	D.Mont	?–present	U.S. District Court judge Russell Evans Smith

== Nebraska ==
Courthouse	City	Image	Street address	Jurisdiction	Dates of use	Named for
U.S. Post Office	Chadron		278 Main Street	D. Neb.	1919–1955; Still in use as a post office.	n/a
U.S. Post Office & Courthouse^{†}	Grand Island		203 West Second Street	D. Neb.	1910–?	n/a
U.S. Post Office	Hastings		?	D. Neb.	1907–1955; Completed in 1905. Razed in the 1970s.	n/a
Old City Hall†	Lincoln		920 East O Street	D. Neb.	1879–1906; Now in use by city agencies.	n/a
U.S. Courthouse & Post Office	Lincoln		129 North 10th Street	D. Neb.	1906–1969; Now a mixed-use facility.	n/a
Robert V. Denney Federal Building	Lincoln		100 Centennial Mall North	D. Neb.	1975–present	U.S. Rep. Robert Vernon Denney
U.S. Post Office & Courthouse	McCook		401 Norris Avenue	D. Neb.	1916–1955; Now privately owned.	n/a
U.S. Post Office & Courthouse^{†}	Norfolk		125 South 4th Street	D. Neb.	1904–1955; Now privately owned.	n/a
U.S. Post Office & Courthouse†	North Platte		416 North Jeffers Street	D. Neb.	1913–? Now the Prairie Arts Center	n/a
North Platte Federal Building	North Platte		300 East Third Street	D. Neb.	?–2014; Still in use by the federal government.	n/a
Lincoln County Courthouse†	North Platte		301 North Jeffers Street	D. Neb.	?–present Occasionally used by the federal court	n/a
U.S. Courthouse, Custom House & Post Office	Omaha		?	D. Neb.	1899–? Razed in the mid-1960s	n/a
Federal Office Building†	Omaha		106 South 15th Street	D. Neb.	1933–c. 1960s Still in use by the federal government.	n/a
Edward Zorinsky Federal Building	Omaha		1616 Capital Avenue	D. Neb.	1960s–2000 Still in use by the federal government.	U.S. Senator Edward Zorinsky
Roman L. Hruska Federal Courthouse	Omaha		111 South 18th Plaza	D. Neb.	2000–present	U.S. Senator Roman Hruska

== Nevada ==
Courthouse	City	Image	Street address	Jurisdiction	Dates of use	Named for
Paul Laxalt State Building† (formerly the U.S. Court House & Post Office)	Carson City		401 North Carson Street	D. Nev.	1891–1965; Now in use by the Nevada Commission on Tourism	Governor Paul Laxalt (1999)
Las Vegas Post Office and Courthouse†	Las Vegas		300 East Stewart Avenue	D. Nev.	1933–1983	n/a
Foley Federal Building and United States Courthouse	Las Vegas		300 Las Vegas Boulevard South	D. Nev.	?–present	The Foley family of Nevada. (1984)
Lloyd D. George Federal Courthouse	Las Vegas		333 Las Vegas Boulevard	D. Nev.	2002–present	District Court judge Lloyd D. George
C. Clifton Young Federal Building and United States Courthouse†	Reno		300 Booth Street	D. Nev.	1965–present Used by the U.S. Bankruptcy Court	U.S. Rep. Clarence Clifton Young (1988)
Bruce R. Thompson U.S. Courthouse and Federal Building	Reno		400 South Virginia Street	D. Nev.	1995–present	District Court judge Bruce Rutherford Thompson

== New Hampshire ==
Courthouse	City	Image	Street address	Jurisdiction	Dates of use	Named for
U.S. Post Office & Court House†	Concord		33 North State Street	D.N.H.	1889–1967; Now the state's Legislative Office Building.	n/a
James C. Cleveland Federal Building and Courthouse	Concord		53 Pleasant Street	D.N.H.	1968–1997	U.S. Representative James C. Cleveland
Warren B. Rudman U.S. Courthouse	Concord		55 Pleasant Street	D.N.H.	1997–present	U.S. Senator Warren Rudman
U.S. Post Office & Court House^{†}	Littleton		134 Main St.	D.N.H.	1935–1982; Still in use as a post office.	n/a
U.S. Custom House & Post Office	Portsmouth		40 Pleasant Street	D.N.H.	1860–1926; Now privately owned.	n/a

== New Jersey ==
Courthouse	City	Image	Street address	Jurisdiction	Dates of use	Named for
United States Post Office and Courthouse†	Camden		401 Market Street	D.N.J.	1932–present	n/a
Mitchell H. Cohen Building & U.S. Courthouse	Camden		4th & Cooper Streets	D.N.J.	1994–present	Judge Mitchell H. Cohen
U.S. Custom House & Post Office	Newark		Government Center	D.N.J.	1896–1936; Razed in 1937	n/a
Frank R. Lautenberg Post Office & Courthouse	Newark		2 Federal Square; Government Center	D.N.J.	1936–present	U.S. Sen. Frank Lautenberg
Martin Luther King Building & U.S. Courthouse	Newark		50 Walnut Street; Government Center	D.N.J.	1992–present	Civil rights movement leader Martin Luther King Jr.
U.S. Court House & Post Office	Trenton		?	D.N.J.	1878–1932; Razed in the 1960s	n/a
Clarkson S. Fisher Federal Building and United States Courthouse†	Trenton		402 East State Street	D.N.J.	1932–present	District Court judge Clarkson Sherman Fisher

== New Mexico ==
Courthouse	City	Image	Street address	Jurisdiction	Dates of use	Named for
Old Post Office†	Albuquerque		123 4th Street	D.N.M.	1924–1930	n/a
Federal Building and U.S. Courthouse^{†}	Albuquerque		421 Gold Avenue SW	D.N.M.	1930–present	n/a
Dennis Chavez Federal Building	Albuquerque		500 Gold Avenue SW	D.N.M.	1972–1998	U.S. Senator Dennis Chavez
Pete V. Domenici U.S. Courthouse	Albuquerque		333 Lomas Boulevard NW	D.N.M.	1998–present	U.S. Senator Pete Domenici (2004)
Las Cruces Judicial Complex	Las Cruces		135 East Griggs Avenue	D.N.M.	1924–1974; Now the Las Cruces Judicial Complex, Municipal Court	n/a
Harold Runnels Federal Building	Las Cruces		200 East Griggs Avenue	D.N.M.	?–2010; Still in use by federal government offices	Harold Lowell Runnels (1983)
U.S. Courthouse	Las Cruces		100 North Church Street	D.N.M.	2010–present	n/a
U.S. Post Office & Courthouse†	Las Vegas		901 Douglas Avenue	D.N.M.	1928–? Now the Las Vegas City Schools Administration Building.	n/a
U.S. Post Office & Courthouse	Roswell		300 North Richardson Avenue	D.N.M.	1924–1961; Completed in 1913; razed in 1971	n/a
Federal Building and U.S. Courthouse	Roswell		500 North Richardson Avenue	D.N.M.	?–present	n/a
Santiago E. Campos U.S. Courthouse†	Santa Fe		106 South Federal Place	D.N.M.	1889–present	District Court judge Santiago E. Campos (2004)

== New York ==
Courthouse	City	Image	Street address	Jurisdiction	Dates of use	Named for
U.S. Custom House & Post Office†	Albany		Broadway and State St.	N.D.N.Y.	1884–1935; Now part of SUNY State University Plaza.	n/a
James T. Foley U.S. Courthouse	Albany		445 Broadway	N.D.N.Y.	1933–present	U.S. District Judge James T. Foley
Old Post Office and Courthouse†	Auburn		157 Genesee Street	N.D.N.Y.	1888–c. 1980; Now owned by Cayuga County.	n/a
U.S. Post Office & Court House	Binghamton			N.D.N.Y.	1891–1935; Razed in 1942.	n/a
Federal Building and U.S. Courthouse	Binghamton		15 Henry Street	N.D.N.Y.	1935–present	n/a
Conrad B. Duberstein U.S. Bankruptcy Courthouse†	Brooklyn		271 Cadman Plaza East	E.D.N.Y.	1892–present Still in use as a bankruptcy courthouse. Also houses a post office on lower levels.	Bankruptcy judge Conrad B. Duberstein (2009)
Emanuel Celler Federal Building	Brooklyn		225 Cadman Plaza East	E.D.N.Y.	1963–present	U.S. Representative Emanuel Celler (1972)
Theodore Roosevelt U.S. Courthouse	Brooklyn		225 Cadman Plaza East	E.D.N.Y.	2006–present	President Theodore Roosevelt (2008)
U.S. Custom House	Buffalo		Washington & Seneca Streets	N.D.N.Y. W.D.N.Y.	1856–1903; Razed in 1965.	n/a
U.S. Post Office†	Buffalo		121 Ellicott Street	W.D.N.Y.	1901–1936; Now owned by Erie Community College.	n/a
Michael J. Dillon Memorial U.S. Courthouse	Buffalo		68 Court Street	W.D.N.Y.	1936–2011	Murdered IRS agent Michael J. Dillon (1986)
Robert H. Jackson United States Courthouse	Buffalo		Niagara Square	W.D.N.Y.	2011–present Upon completion, the building was the most expensive government building in the history of Western New York	Robert H. Jackson United States Attorney General and Associate Justice of the United States Supreme Court
Ontario County Court House (space leased by the U.S. gov't)	Canandaigua		27 North Main Street	N.D.N.Y. W.D.N.Y.	1860–c. 1912; Still in use as the Ontario County Courthouse.	n/a
U.S. Post Office†	Canandaigua		28 North Main Street	W.D.N.Y.	1912–? Now part of the Canandaigua YMCA.	n/a
U.S. Post Office & Court House	Elmira		200 East Church Street	W.D.N.Y.	1903–? Now owned by the city.	n/a
U.S. Courthouse	Fort Drum		Lewis Avenue and First Street East	N.D.N.Y.		n/a
Alfonse M. D'Amato U.S. Courthouse	Central Islip		100 Federal Plaza	E.D.N.Y.	2002–present	U.S. Senator Al D'Amato
U.S. Post Office	Jamestown		West 3rd and Washington Streets	W.D.N.Y.	1904–1960; Razed in May, 1963.	n/a
U.S. Post Office	Jamestown		300 East 3rd Street	W.D.N.Y.	1960–? Now an office building partially leased by the Post Office.	n/a
U.S. Post Office†	Lockport		1 East Avenue	W.D.N.Y.	1904–1916; Still in use as a post office.	n/a
City Hall Post Office and Courthouse	Manhattan		Broadway at Park Row	S.D.N.Y. 2d Cir.	1875–1939; Construction began 1869; completed in 1880; demolished in 1939.	n/a
Thurgood Marshall U.S. Courthouse†	Manhattan		40 Centre Street (in Foley Square)	S.D.N.Y., 2d Cir.	1936–present	Associate Justice Thurgood Marshall (2001)
James L. Watson Court of International Trade Building	Manhattan		1 Federal Plaza (in Foley Square)	C.I.T.	1967–present	Customs Court judge James L. Watson
Daniel Patrick Moynihan U.S. Courthouse	Manhattan		500 Pearl Street (in Foley Square)	S.D.N.Y.	1994–present	U.S. Senator Daniel Patrick Moynihan (2000)
U.S. Post Office & Court House	Rochester		30 Church Street	N.D.N.Y. W.D.N.Y.	1891–1972; Now Rochester City Hall.	n/a
Kenneth B. Keating Federal Building	Rochester		100 State Street	W.D.N.Y.	1973–present	U.S. Sen. Kenneth Keating
U.S. Court House & Post Office	Syracuse			N.D.N.Y.	1900–1928; Completed in 1889; razed in 1949.	n/a
Clinton Exchange	Syracuse		Clinton Square	N.D.N.Y.	1928–?	n/a
James M. Hanley Federal Building	Syracuse		100 South Clinton Street	N.D.N.Y.	1976–present	U.S. Rep. James M. Hanley
U.S. Court House & Post Office	Utica		258 Genesee Street	N.D.N.Y.	1882–1929	n/a
Alexander Pirnie Federal Building†	Utica		258 Genesee Street	N.D.N.Y.	1929–present	U.S. Rep. Alexander Pirnie (1984)
Charles L. Brieant, Jr. Federal Building and Courthouse	White Plains		300 Quarropas Street	S.D.N.Y.	1983–present	District Court judge Charles L. Brieant (2008)

== North Carolina ==
Courthouse	City	Image	Street address	Jurisdiction	Dates of use	Named for
U.S. Post Office and Court House	Asheville		?	W.D.N.C. 4th Cir.	1892–ca. 1930; Razed ca. 1930.	n/a
Federal Building and U.S. Courthouse	Asheville		100 Otis Street	W.D.N.C. 4th Cir.	1930–present	n/a
Federal Building	Bryson City		50 Main Street	W.D.N.C.	1963–? Still in use as a federal office building.	n/a
U.S. Court House & Post Office	Charlotte		West Trade St.	W.D.N.C.	1891–1913; Razed in 1913.	n/a
Charles R. Jonas Federal Building†	Charlotte		401 West Trade Street	W.D.N.C.	1915–present Sold to the city in 2005; leased thereafter.	U.S. Rep. Charles R. Jonas
John Hervey Wheeler U.S. Courthouse	Durham		323 East Chapel Hill Street	M.D.N.C.	1936–present	John Hervey Wheeler
J. Herbert W. Small Federal Building and U.S. Courthouse	Elizabeth City		306 East Main Street	E.D.N.C.	1906–present	J. Herbert W. Small (2009)
Federal Building, U.S. Post Office and Courthouse	Fayetteville		301 Green Street	E.D.N.C.	1966–present	n/a
U.S. Court House & Post Office	Greensboro		101 S. Elm St.	W.D.N.C. M.D.N.C.	1887–1933; Razed ca. 1938.	n/a
L. Richardson Preyer Federal Building†	Greensboro		324 West Market Street	M.D.N.C.	1933–present	U.S. Rep. and District Court judge L. Richardson Preyer (1988)
U.S. Courthouse	Greenville		201 Evans Street	E.D.N.C.	?–present	n/a
Federal Building†	Greenville		215 Evans Street	E.D.N.C.	?–present Completed in 1914.	n/a
U.S. Bankruptcy Court	Greenville		150 Reade Circle	E.D.N.C.	?–present	n/a
U.S. Post Office, Courthouse, & Custom House†	New Bern		300 Pollock Street	E.D.N.C.	1897–1935; Now New Bern City Hall.	n/a
U.S. Post Office & Courthouse	New Bern		413 Middle Street	E.D.N.C.	1935–present	n/a
Federal Building & Post Office Century Station†	Raleigh		314 Fayetteville Street Mall	E.D.N.C.	1912–present Construction completed in 1879.	n/a
Terry Sanford Federal Building and Courthouse	Raleigh		310 New Bern Avenue	E.D.N.C.	?–present	U.S. Senator Terry Sanford
U.S. Post Office and Federal Building†	Rockingham		125 South Hancock Street	M.D.N.C.	1935–1980; Now owned by Richmond County.	n/a
U.S. Post Office	Salisbury		130 West Innes Street	W.D.N.C. M.D.N.C.	1911–1980; Now Rowan County administrative offices.	n/a
U.S. Court House & Post Office†	Statesville		227 South Center Street	W.D.N.C.	1891–1939; Now Statesville City Hall.	n/a
U.S. Post Office and Courthouse	Statesville		200 West Broad Street	W.D.N.C.	1939–present	n/a
U.S. Post Office & Court House	Washington		102 East 2nd Street	E.D.N.C.	1913–1992; Now the Municipal Building.	n/a
U.S. Post Office & Court House†	Wilkesboro		201 West Main Street	W.D.N.C. M.D.N.C.	1917–1980; Now an office building.	n/a
Johnson J. Hayes Federal Building	Wilkesboro		207 West Main Street	M.D.N.C.	1969–ca. 2012	Johnson Jay Hayes
U.S. Custom House	Wilmington		N. Water between Princess & Market	D.N.C. E.D.N.C.	1846–1891; Razed ca. 1914.	n/a
U.S. Post Office & Custom House	Wilmington		Front & Chestnut Sts.	E.D.N.C.	1891–1919; Razed in 1936.	n/a
Alton Lennon Federal Building and Courthouse†	Wilmington		2 Princess Street	E.D.N.C.	1919–present	U.S. Senator Alton Asa Lennon
U.S. Post Office and Courthouse	Wilson		224 East Nash Street	E.D.N.C.	1928–? Now the Imagination Station Science Museum.	n/a
U.S. Post Office	Winston-Salem		101 West 5th Street	W.D.N.C. M.D.N.C.	1926–1976; Now the Millennium Center.	n/a
Hiram H. Ward Federal Building and U.S. Courthouse	Winston-Salem		251 North Main Street	M.D.N.C.	1976–present	District Court judge Hiram Hamilton Ward

== North Dakota ==
Courthouse	City	Image	Street address	Jurisdiction	Dates of use	Named for
U.S. Post Office and Court House^{†}	Bismarck		304 E. Broadway Ave.	D.N.D.	1913–1964; Still in use as a federal office building.	n/a
William L. Guy Federal Building	Bismarck		220 East Rosser Avenue	D.N.D.	1964–present	Governor William L. Guy (1999)
U.S. Post Office and Court House^{†}	Devil's Lake		?	D.N.D.	1913–1948; Now the Lake Region Heritage Center.	n/a
U.S. Post Office and Court House	Fargo		?	D.N.D.	1897–c. 1931; Razed.	n/a
Quentin N. Burdick U.S. Courthouse	Fargo		655 First Avenue North	D.N.D.	1931–present Expanded in 1998	U.S. Senator Quentin N. Burdick
Ronald N. Davies Federal Bldg & U.S. Courthouse^{†}	Grand Forks		102 North Fourth Street	D.N.D.	1906–present	District Court judge Ronald N. Davies (2002)
U.S. Post Office and Court House	Jamestown		222 1st Avenue South	D.N.D.	1930–1948; Completed in 1929; now used as apartments.	n/a
Bruce M. Van Sickle Federal Building and U.S. Courthouse†	Minot		100 First Street SW	D.N.D.	1915–present	District Court judge Bruce Van Sickle (2002)

== Ohio ==
Courthouse	City	Image	Street address	Jurisdiction	Dates of use	Named for
John F. Seiberling Federal Building & U.S. Courthouse	Akron		2 South Main Street	N.D. Ohio	1974–present	U.S. Rep. John F. Seiberling
Frank T. Bow Federal Building & U.S. Courthouse	Canton		201 Cleveland Avenue South	N.D. Ohio	1933–2010	U.S. Rep. Frank T. Bow
Ralph Regula Federal Building & U.S. Courthouse	Canton		401 McKinley Avenue SW	N.D. Ohio	2010–present	U.S. Rep. Ralph Regula
U.S. Custom House and Post Office	Cincinnati		100 East Fifth Street	S.D. Ohio; 6th Cir.	1885–1936; Razed in 1936.	n/a
Potter Stewart U.S. Courthouse^{†}	Cincinnati		100 East Fifth Street	S.D. Ohio	1938–present	Supreme Court Justice Potter Stewart (1994)
Howard M. Metzenbaum U.S. Courthouse†	Cleveland		201 Superior Avenue	N.D. Ohio	1911–present	U.S. Sen. Howard Metzenbaum
Carl B. Stokes Federal Court House Building	Cleveland		801 West Superior Avenue	N.D. Ohio	2002–present	Cleveland mayor Carl Stokes
U.S. Court House and Post Office^{†}	Columbus		121 East State Street	S.D. Ohio	1887–1934	n/a
Joseph P. Kinneary U.S. Courthouse	Columbus		85 Marconi Boulevard	S.D. Ohio	1934–present	District Court judge Joseph Peter Kinneary (1998)
U.S. Post Office	Dayton		?	S.D. Ohio	1907–? Demolished.	n/a
U.S. Post Office and Courthouse†	Dayton		120 West 3rd Street	S.D. Ohio	1915–ca. 1976; 1995–present	n/a
Walter H. Rice Federal Building and United States Courthouse	Dayton		200 West Second Street	S.D. Ohio	1976–present	Walter Herbert Rice
U.S. Post Office and Courthouse	Steubenville		North 4th and Washington Streets	S.D. Ohio	1925–?	n/a
U.S. Custom House and Post Office	Toledo		?	N.D. Ohio	1888–1932; Demolished in 1964.	n/a
James M. Ashley & Thomas W.L. Ashley U.S. Courthouse^{†}	Toledo		1716 Spielbusch	N.D. Ohio	1932–present	U.S. Rep. James Mitchell Ashley and U.S. Rep. Thomas W. L. Ashley
U.S. Post Office and Courthouse†	Youngstown		9 West Front Street	N.D. Ohio	1933–? Now used by the city.	n/a
Thomas D. Lambros Federal Building & U.S. Courthouse	Youngstown		125 Market Street	N.D. Ohio	1995–present	District Court judge Thomas Demetrios Lambros
Nathaniel R. Jones Federal Building & U.S. Courthouse	Youngstown		10 East Commerce Street	N.D. Ohio	2002–present	Court of Appeals judge Nathaniel R. Jones
U.S. Post Office & Federal Building†	Zanesville		65 South Fifth Street	S.D. Ohio	1904–? Still in use as a post office.	n/a

== Oklahoma ==
Courthouse	City	Image	Street address	Jurisdiction	Dates of use	Named for
U.S. Post Office and Courthouse	Ada		131 East 12th Street	E.D. Ok.	1934–? Still in use as a post office.	n/a
U.S. Post Office and Courthouse	Ardmore		39 North Washington Street	E.D. Ok.	1916–? Still in use as a federal building.	n/a
U.S. Post Office and Courthouse	Bartlesville		420 South Johnstone Avenue	N.D. Ok.	1932–? Now the Washington County Courthouse.	n/a
U.S. Post Office and Courthouse†	Chickasha		117 North 4th Street	E.D. Ok. W.D. Ok.	1919–? Now the city hall.	n/a
Wheeler Federal Building	Durant		224 West Evergreen Street	E.D. Ok.	1929–? Built 1919; now owned by the city.	n/a
U.S. Post Office and Courthouse	Enid		?	W.D. Ok.	1912–1941; Razed in the early 1960s.	n/a
U.S. Post Office and Courthouse	Enid		115 West Broadway Avenue	W.D. Ok.	1941–? Still in use as a post office.	n/a
U.S. Post Office and Courthouse	Guthrie		201 West Oklahoma Avenue	W.D. Ok.	1906–c. 1996; Still in use as a post office.	n/a
Federal Building and U.S. Courthouse^{†}	Lawton		410 Southwest 5th Street	W.D. Ok. U.S. Probation Office	1917–present	n/a
U.S. Post Office	Mangum		101 South Pennsylvania Avenue	W.D. Ok.	1936–? Still in use as a post office.	n/a
Carl Albert Federal Building†	McAlester		301 East Carl Albert Parkway	E.D. Ok.	1914–2013; Now owned by the city.	U.S. Rep. Carl Albert (1984)
U.S. Post Office and Courthouse	Miami		34 A Street Northeast	N.D. Ok.	1933–? Still in use as a post office.	n/a
Ed Edmondson U.S. Courthouse^{†}	Muskogee		101 North Fifth Street	E.D. Okla.	1915–present	U.S. Rep. Ed Edmondson (2003)
U.S. Post Office, Courthouse, and Federal Office Building^{†}	Oklahoma City		215 Dean A. McGee Avenue	8th Cir. 10th Cir.	1926–present	n/a
William J. Holloway, Jr. U.S. Courthouse	Oklahoma City		200 Northwest 4th Street	W.D. Ok. 10th Cir.	1962–present	William Judson Holloway Jr. (2016)
U.S. Post Office and Courthouse	Okmulgee		111 West 4th Street	E.D. Ok. Bankruptcy Court	1933–present	n/a
U.S. Post Office and Courthouse	Ponca City		402 East Grand Avenue	W.D. Ok.	1934–? Still in use as a post office.	n/a
U.S. Post Office and Courthouse^{†}	Tulsa		224 South Boulder Avenue	E.D. Ok. N.D. Ok.	1917–present	n/a
U.S. Post Office and Courthouse	Vinita		120 East Illinois Avenue	N.D. Ok.	1939–1966; Still in use as a post office.	n/a
U.S. Post Office and Courthouse^{†}	Woodward		1023 10th Street	W.D. Ok.	1921–1966; Now the Woodward Public Schools Administration Building.	n/a

== Oregon ==
Courthouse	City	Image	Street address	Jurisdiction	Dates of use	Named for
Federal Building and United States Courthouse	Eugene		211 East 7th Avenue	D. Ore.	1975–?	n/a
Wayne L. Morse U.S. Courthouse	Eugene		405 East 8th Avenue	D. Ore. 9th Cir.	2006–present	U.S. Senator Wayne Morse
James A. Redden Federal Courthouse^{†}	Medford		310 West Sixth Street	D. Ore.	1916–present	District Court judge James A. Redden (1996)
John F. Kilkenny U.S. Post Office and Courthouse^{†}	Pendleton		104 Southwest Dorion	D. Ore.	1916–present	Court of Appeals judge John Kilkenny
Gus J. Solomon U.S. Courthouse^{†}	Portland		Main Street & 6th Avenue SW	D. Ore.	1933–1997	District Court judge Gus J. Solomon
Pioneer Courthouse^{††}	Portland		555 Southwest Yamhill Street	D. Ore. 9th Cir.	1875–1933; 1973–present	American pioneers to the Northwest Territory (1969)
Mark O. Hatfield U.S. Courthouse	Portland		1000 Southwest Third Avenue	D. Ore.	1997–present	U.S. Senator Mark Hatfield

== Pennsylvania ==
Courthouse	City	Image	Street address	Jurisdiction	Dates of use	Status	Named for
Edward N. Cahn U.S. Courthouse and Federal Building	Allentown		504 West Hamilton Street	E.D. Pa.	1995–present	Current	Edward N. Cahn (1999)
U.S. Post Office	Easton		201 Ferry Street	E.D. Pa.	1930–1970; 1987–1990; Completed in 1913; still in use as a post office.	Current (Post Office only)	n/a
U.S. Court House & Post Office	Erie		17 South Park Row	W.D. Pa.	1887–ca. 1938; Razed ca. 1938.	Lapsed	n/a
Erie Federal Courthouse and Post Office†	Erie		617 State Street	W.D. Pa.	1938–present	Current	n/a
U.S. Post Office and Courthouse	Harrisburg		North 3rd and Walnut Streets	M.D. Pa.	1901–c. 1964; Completed in 1882; razed in 1965	Lapsed	n/a
Ronald Reagan Federal Building and Courthouse	Harrisburg		228 Walnut Street	M.D. Pa.	1966–present	Current	President Ronald Reagan (2004)
U.S. Post Office & Courthouse	Lewisburg		301 Market Street	M.D. Pa.	1933–? Still in use as a post office.	Current (Post Office only)	n/a
Old City Hall	Philadelphia		Chestnut Street and Fifth Street	U.S.	1791-1800; Continued as Philadelphia City Hall until 1854. Now part of the Independence Hall complex of Independence National Historical Park in Center City, Philadelphia.	Historical	n/a
U.S. Post Office & Courthouse	Philadelphia		Chestnut Street	E.D. Pa. 3d Cir.	1884–1937; Razed ca. 1942.	Lapsed	n/a
Robert N. C. Nix, Sr., Federal Building†	Philadelphia		900 Market Street	3d Cir. E.D. Pa.	1941–present Completed in 1939	Current	U.S. Rep. Robert N. C. Nix, Sr. (1985)
James A. Byrne Courthouse	Philadelphia		601 Market Street	E.D. Pa.	1975–present	Current	U.S. Rep. James A. Byrne
U.S. Court House & Post Office	Pittsburgh		Smithfield Street	W.D. Pa.	1891–1934; Razed in 1934.	Lapsed	n/a
Joseph F. Weis, Jr. U.S. Courthouse^{†}	Pittsburgh		700 Grant Street	W.D. Pa.	1934–present	Current	Joseph F. Weis Jr. (2015)
Lackawanna County Courthouse†	Scranton		200 North Washington Avenue	W.D. Pa.	1886–c. 1894; Completed in 1884; still in use as the County Courthouse.	Current	n/a
U.S. Post Office (aka Old Post Office)	Scranton		?	W.D. Pa. M.D. Pa.	1894–1930; Razed in 1930.	Lapsed	n/a
William J. Nealon Federal Building and U.S. Courthouse†	Scranton		235 North Washington Avenue	M.D. Pa.	1931–present	Current	District Court judge William Joseph Nealon, Jr. (1996)
Max Rosenn U.S. Courthouse Luzerne County Courthouse	Wilkes-Barre		197 South Main Street	M.D. Pa.	1934–present	Current	Circuit Court judge Max Rosenn
U.S. Courthouse and Post Office†	Williamsport		245 West 4th Street	W.D. Pa. M.D. Pa.	1891–? Now Williamsport City Hall.	Current (City Hall and Historical only)	n/a
Herman T. Schneebeli Federal Building and Courthouse	Williamsport		240 West Third Street	M.D. Pa.	1977–present	Current	U.S. Rep. Herman T. Schneebeli (1976)

== Rhode Island ==
Courthouse	City	Image	Street address	Jurisdiction	Dates of use	Named for
John E. Fogarty Judicial Annex	Providence†		24 Weybosset Street	D.R.I.	1857–1908; Now in use by Rhode Island state courts.	U.S. Rep. John E. Fogarty (renamed after federal usage ceased)
Federal Building^{†}	Providence		1 Exchange Terrace	D.R.I.	1908–present	n/a
John O. Pastore Federal Building	Providence		2 Exchange Terrace	D.R.I.	1940–present	Governor John O. Pastore (1977)

== South Carolina ==
Courthouse	City	Image	Street address	Jurisdiction	Dates of use	Named for
Charles E. Simons, Jr. Federal Court House	Aiken		223 Park Avenue SW	E.D.S.C. D.S.C.	1935–present	District Court judge Charles Earl Simons, Jr. (1986)
U.S. Post Office and Courthouse	Anderson		401 North Main Street	W.D.S.C.	1916–1938; Built in 1910, now privately owned.	n/a
G. Ross Anderson, Jr. Federal Building and U.S. Courthouse†	Anderson		315 South McDuffie Street	W.D.S.C. D.S.C.	1938–present	District Court judge G. Ross Anderson (2001)
Beaufort Federal Courthouse	Beaufort		1501 Bay Street	D.S.C.	1994–2015; Built in 1883, formerly used as the County Courthouse; now a museum.	n/a
John Rutledge House^{††}	Charleston		116 Broad Street	E.D.S.C.	1866–1868; Built in 1763, now the John Rutledge House Inn.	Supreme Court Chief Justice and Governor John Rutledge
U.S. Custom House^{†}	Charleston		200 East Bay Street	E.D.S.C.	1884–1896; Built in 1879, still in use as a custom house.	n/a
U.S. Post Office and Courthouse^{†}	Charleston		85 Broad Street	E.D.S.C. D.S.C.	1896–1988; Still in use as a federal office building.	n/a
J. Waties Waring Judicial Center (formerly the Hollings Judicial Center)	Charleston		83 Meeting Street	D.S.C.	1988–present	Julius Waties Waring (2015); Governor and U.S. Senator Ernest Hollings
U.S. Courthouse and Post Office^{†}	Columbia		1737 Main Street	E.D.S.C. D.S.C.	1874–1936; Now Columbia City Hall.	n/a
J. Bratton Davis U.S. Bankruptcy Courthouse^{†}	Columbia		1100 Laurel Street	E.D.S.C. D.S.C.	1936–present	District Bankruptcy Court judge J. Bratton Davis (2000)
Strom Thurmond Federal Building and U.S. Courthouse†	Columbia		1835 Assembly Street	D.S.C.	1979–2003; Still in use by other federal agencies.	Governor and U.S. Senator Strom Thurmond
Matthew J. Perry, Jr. U.S. Courthouse	Columbia		901 Richland Street	D.S.C.	2003–present	District Court judge Matthew James Perry (2004)
U.S. Post Office and Courthouse^{†}	Florence		201 West Evans Street	D.S.C. E.D.S.C.	1906–1975; Now privately owned.	n/a
McMillan Federal Building	Florence		401 West Evans Street	D.S.C.	1975–present	U.S. Representative John L. McMillan
U.S. Courthouse and Post Office^{*}	Greenville		Main and Broad Streets	W.D.S.C. D.S.C.	1892–1937; Later used as City Hall; razed in 1973.	n/a
Clement F. Haynsworth Jr. Federal Building†	Greenville		300 East Washington Street	W.D.S.C. D.S.C.	1937–present	Court of Appeals judge Clement Haynsworth (1982)
U.S. Post Office and Courthouse	Greenwood		120 Main Street	W.D.S.C. D.S.C.	1915–1968; Now an arts center.	n/a
U.S. Post Office and Courthouse^{†}	Rock Hill		102 Main Street	W.D.S.C. D.S.C.	1932–1983; Now owned by the city.	n/a
Donald S. Russell Federal Building and U.S. Courthouse†	Spartanburg		201 Magnolia Street	W.D.S.C. D.S.C.	1931–present	Governor and U.S. Senator Donald Stuart Russell

== South Dakota ==
Courthouse	City	Image	Street address	Jurisdiction	Dates of use	Named for
U.S. Post Office	Aberdeen		4th Avenue Southeast & South Lincoln Street	D.S.D.	1904–1937; Demolished.	n/a
U.S. Post Office & Court House^{†}	Aberdeen		102 4th Avenue Southeast	D.S.D.	1937–present	n/a
U.S. Post Office & Court House	Deadwood		68 Sherman Street	D.S.D.	1907–? Still in use as a post office.	n/a
U.S. Post Office & Court House	Pierre		118 West Capitol Avenue	D.S.D.	1906–1965; Now in use by various state agencies.	n/a
Pierre Federal Building, U.S. Post Office and Courthouse	Pierre		225 South Pierre Street	D.S.D.	1965–present	n/a
Andrew W. Bogue Federal Building & U.S. Courthouse	Rapid City		515 Ninth Street	D.S.D.	1973–present	District Court judge Andrew Wendell Bogue (2011)
Federal Building & U.S. Courthouse^{†}	Sioux Falls		400 South Phillips Avenue	D.S.D.	1895–present	n/a

== Tennessee ==
Courthouse	City	Image	Street address	Jurisdiction	Dates of use	Named for
U.S. Post Office†	Bristol		620 Shelby Street	E.D. Tenn.	?	n/a
U.S. Post Office & Courthouse†	Chattanooga		East 11th and Lindsay Streets	E.D. Tenn.	1893–1933; 1991–present	n/a
Joel W. Solomon Federal Building and U.S. Courthouse†	Chattanooga		900 Georgia Avenue	E.D. Tenn.	1933–present	Administrator of the General Services Administration Joel W. Solomon (1981)
U.S. Post Office & Courthouse†	Columbia		815 South Garden Street	M.D. Tenn.	1941–present	n/a
L. Clure Morton U.S. Post Office and Courthouse†	Cookeville		9 East Broad Street	M.D. Tenn.	1916–present	District Court judge Leland Clure Morton (1996)
U.S. Post Office & Courthouse	Greeneville		101 West Summer Street	E.D. Tenn.	1905–? Now the Greeneville Federal Bank.	n/a
James H. Quillen U.S. Courthouse	Greeneville		220 West Depot Street	E.D. Tenn.	2001–present	U.S. Rep. James H. Quillen
U.S. Court House & Post Office	Jackson		Baltimore St.	W.D. Tenn.	1888–1934; Building razed.	n/a
Ed Jones Federal Building and U.S. Courthouse†	Jackson	109 South Highland Avenue	W.D. Tenn.	1934–present	U.S. Rep. Ed Jones (1988)	
U.S. Court House & Post Office†	Knoxville		600 Market Street	E.D. Tenn.	1874–1933; Later used by the Tennessee Valley Authority; now the East Tennessee Historical Center.	n/a
U.S. Post Office & Courthouse†	Knoxville		501 Main Street	E.D. Tenn.	1934–1998; Now in use by the Tennessee state courts and a post office.	n/a
Howard H. Baker, Jr. U.S. Courthouse	Knoxville		800 Market Street	E.D. Tenn.	?–present Completed in 1991.	U.S. Sen. Howard H. Baker, Jr.
U.S. Custom House, Courthouse, and Post Office†	Memphis		1 North Front Street	W.D. Tenn.	1885–? Expanded in 1930; Now the Cecil C. Humphreys School of Law.	n/a
Odell Horton Federal Building	Memphis		167 North Main Street	W.D. Tenn.	ca. 1963–present	Odell Horton (2007)
U.S. Customs House†	Nashville		701 Broadway	M.D. Tenn.	1882–1952; 1992–present Now privately owned and leased by the government.	n/a
Estes Kefauver Federal Bldg. and U.S. Courthouse†	Nashville		801 Broadway	M.D. Tenn.	1952–present	U.S. Sen. Estes Kefauver
Fred D. Thompson U.S. Courthouse and Federal Building	Nashville		719 Church Street	M.D. Tenn.	2022–present	U.S. Sen. and actor Fred Thompson
U.S. Post Office & Courthouse	Winchester		200 South Jefferson Street	E.D. Tenn.	?–present	n/a

== Texas ==
Courthouse	City	Image	Street address	Jurisdiction	Dates of use	Named for
U.S. Post Office and Courthouse	Abilene		?	N.D. Tex.	1903–1935; Razed August 22, 1962.	n/a
Federal Building, U.S. Post Office and Courthouse†	Abilene		341 Pine Street	N.D. Tex.	1936–present	n/a
U.S. Courthouse	Alpine		2450 N. State Highway 118	W.D. Tex.	?–present	n/a
U.S. Post Office & Courthouse	Amarillo		620 South Taylor Street	N.D. Tex.	1916–1938; Now FirstCapital Bank of Texas.	n/a
J. Marvin Jones Federal Building and U.S. Courthouse^{†}	Amarillo		205 Southeast Fifth Avenue	N.D. Tex.	1938–present	U.S. Court of Claims judge John Marvin Jones (1980)
Court House & Post Office†	Austin		601 Colorado Street	W.D. Tex.	1881–1936; Now offices of the Texas State University System	n/a
U.S. Courthouse†	Austin		200 West 8th Street	W.D. Tex.	1936–2012	n/a
Homer Thornberry Judicial Building	Austin		903 San Jacinto Boulevard	W.D. Tex.	?–present Completed in 1965.	Homer Thornberry
U.S. Courthouse	Austin		501 West 5th Street	W.D. Tex.	2012–present	n/a
U.S. Post Office & Court House	Beaumont		?	E.D. Tex.	1902–1933; Razed in 1933.	n/a
Jack Brooks Federal Building	Beaumont		300 Willow Street	E.D. Tex.	1933–present	U.S. Rep. Jack Brooks (1978)
U.S. Court House, Custom House, & Post Office	Brownsville		?	W.D. Tex. S.D. Tex.	1892–1931; Building razed.	n/a
U.S. Court House, Custom House, & Post Office	Brownsville		1001 East Elizabeth Street	S.D. Tex.	1931–1999; Now Brownsville City Hall as well as a post office	n/a
Reynaldo G. Garza-Filemon B. Vela U.S. Courthouse	Brownsville		600 East Harrison Street	S.D. Tex.	1999–present	Judges Reynaldo Garza and Filemon Vela, Sr.
1915 Corpus Christi Federal Courthouse	Corpus Christi		521 Starr Street	?	?–2001; Originally Customs House; Now a law firm	n/a
Corpus Christi Federal Courthouse	Corpus Christi		1133 North Shoreline Boulevard	S.D. Tex.	2001–present Built for newly created Corpus Christi Division.	n/a
U.S. Courthouse and Post Office	Dallas		?	N.D. Tex.	1888–1930; Razed in 1939.	n/a
U.S. Post Office and Courthouse	Dallas		400 North Ervay Street	N.D. Tex.	1930–1971; Still in use as a post office.	n/a
Santa Fe Office Building†	Dallas		1114 Commerce Street	N.D. Tex.	1945–1971; Built in 1926; Now serves as annex to Earle Cabell Federal Building.	n/a
Earle Cabell Federal Bldg & Courthouse	Dallas		1100 Commerce Street	N.D. Tex.	1971–present	Dallas Mayor Earle Cabell
U.S. Post Office and Courthouse	Del Rio		100 East Broadway	W.D. Tex.	1914–? Now owned by the county.	n/a
Federal Building	Del Rio		111 East Broadway	W.D. Tex.	?–present	n/a
U.S. Customs House, Post Office, & Court House	El Paso		?	W.D. Tex.	1892–1936; Razed in 1936.	n/a
U.S. Courthouse†	El Paso		511 East San Antonio Avenue	W.D. Tex.	1936–present	n/a
Albert Armendariz, Sr. U.S. Courthouse	El Paso		525 Magoffin Avenue	W.D. Tex.	2009–present	n/a
Post Office and Federal Building	Fort Worth		914 Jennings Avenue	N.D. Tex. 5th Cir.	1896–1934; Demolished in 1963.	n/a
Eldon B. Mahon United States Courthouse†	Fort Worth		501 West Tenth Street	N.D. Tex. 5th Cir.	1934–present	District Court judge Eldon Brooks Mahon (2003)
U.S. Customs House and Courthouse†	Galveston		1918 Postoffice Street	E.D. Tex. S.D. Tex.	1861–1891; 1917–1937; Now leased by GSA to the Galveston Historical Foundation.	n/a
U.S. Post Office, Court House & Customs Building	Galveston		601 25th Street	E.D. Tex. S.D. Tex.	1891–1917; Razed in 1935 to make way for current Federal Court building.	n/a
U.S. Post Office, Custom House and Courthouse	Galveston		601 25th Street	S.D. Tex.	1937–present	n/a
U.S. Post Office	Houston		?	S.D. Tex.	1891–1911; Building razed.	n/a
U.S. Post Office and Courthouse†	Houston		701 San Jacinto Street	S.D. Tex.	1911–1962; Still in use by various federal agencies.	n/a
Bob Casey U.S. Courthouse	Houston		515 Rusk Street	S.D. Tex.	1961–present	U.S. Rep. Robert R. Casey
U.S. Court House & Post Office^{†}	Jefferson		223 West Austin	E.D. Tex.	1890–1961; Now the Jefferson Historical Society Museum.	n/a
U.S. Post Office, Courthouse and Custom House†	Laredo		1300 Matamoros Street	S.D. Tex.	1907–2004; Still in use as a post office.	n/a
George P. Kazen Federal Building and United States Courthouse	Laredo		1300 Victoria Street	S.D. Tex.	2004–present	George P. Kazen
Lubbock Post Office and Federal Building^{†}	Lubbock		800 Broadway Avenue	N.D. Tex.	1932–1968; Now privately owned	n/a
George H. Mahon Federal Building and U.S. Courthouse	Lubbock		1205 Texas Avenue	N.D. Tex.	1971–present	U.S. Rep. George H. Mahon
Ward R. Burke U.S. Courthouse†	Lufkin		104 North Third Street	E.D. Tex.	1980–present Completed in 1936.	Lufkin attorney Ward R. Burke (1987)
Sam B. Hall Jr. Federal Building and U.S. Courthouse†	Marshall		100 East Houston Street	E.D. Tex.	1915–present	U.S. Rep. & District Court judge Sam B. Hall
George H.W. Bush and George W. Bush United States Courthouse and George Mahon Federal Building	Midland		200 East Wall Street	W.D. Tex.	?–present	President George H. W. Bush (2013); President George W. Bush (2013); U.S. Rep. George H. Mahon
U.S. Court House & Post Office	Paris		Northeast corner of Church St. & Lamar Ave.	E.D. Tex.	1902–1916; Destroyed by fire in 1916.	n/a
U.S. Post Office & Court House	Paris		231 Lamar Avenue	E.D. Tex.	1925–2002; Building now owned by Lamar County.	n/a
U.S. Post Office and Courthouse	Pecos		106 West 4th Street	W.D. Tex.	1936–1995; Still in use as a post office.	n/a
Lucius D. Bunton III U.S. Courthouse	Pecos		410 South Cedar Street	W.D. Tex.	1995–present	Lucius Desha Bunton III (2016)
United States Courthouse	Plano		7940 Preston Road	E.D. Tex.	2008–present	n/a
O.C. Fisher Federal Building and U.S. Courthouse	San Angelo		33 East Twohig Avenue	N.D. Tex.	1911–present	U.S. Rep. O. C. Fisher (1980)
U.S. Court House & Post Office	San Antonio		?	W.D. Tex.	1890–1935; Razed in 1935.	n/a
Hipolito F. Garcia Federal Building and U.S. Courthouse^{†}	San Antonio		615 East Houston Street	W.D. Tex.	1936–present	District Court judge Hipolito Frank Garcia (2004)
John H. Wood Jr. U.S. Courthouse	San Antonio		655 East César Chávez Boulevard	W.D. Tex.	?–present Completed in 1968	John H. Wood Jr.
Paul Brown Federal Building and U.S. Courthouse^{†}	Sherman		101 East Pecan Street	E.D. Tex.	1907–present	Paul Neeley Brown (2014)
U.S. Courthouse and Post Office	Texarkana		?	E.D. Tex.	1892–1911; Razed in 1930.	n/a
U.S. Court House	Texarkana		321 West 4th Street	E.D. Tex.	1911–1933; Now the Texarkana Regional Arts Center.	n/a
U.S. Post Office and Courthouse†	Texarkana		500 North State Line Avenue	E.D. Tex.	1933–present	n/a
U.S. Court House & Post Office	Tyler		Bois D'Arc & West Ferguson	E.D. Tex.	1889–1933; Razed in 1933.	n/a
William M. Steger Federal Building and U.S. Courthouse^{†}	Tyler		211 West Ferguson Street	E.D. Tex.	1934–present	District Court judge William Steger (2006)
U.S. Post Office and Courthouse†	Victoria		210 East Constitution	S.D. Tex.	1913–1960; Now privately owned.	n/a
Martin Luther King Jr. Federal Building	Victoria		312 South Main	S.D. Tex.	1960–present	Martin Luther King Jr. (since c. 1993)
U.S. Court House & Post Office	Waco		Southwest corner of Franklin & 4th	N.D. Tex. W.D. Tex.	1889–1937; Sold in 1939.	n/a
Universal City Municipal Court	Bexar		2150 Universal City Blvd, Universal City, TX 78148	W.D. Tex.	1932–present	n/a
Graham B. Purcell Jr., Post Office and Federal Building	Wichita Falls		1000 Lamar Street	N.D. Tex.	1933–present	Graham B. Purcell Jr. (1993)

== Utah ==
Courthouse	City	Image	Street address	Jurisdiction	Dates of use	Named for
U.S. Post Office and Courthouse^{†}	Ogden		298 East 24th Street	D. Utah	1909–1965; Now privately owned.	n/a
James V. Hansen Federal Building	Ogden		324 East 25th Street	D. Utah	1965–?	U.S. Rep. James V. Hansen (2004)
Frank E. Moss U.S. Courthouse	Salt Lake City		350 South Main Street	D. Utah	1905–present	U.S. Sen. Frank E. Moss (1990)
Orrin G. Hatch U.S. Courthouse	Salt Lake City		351 South West Temple Street	D. Utah	2014–present	U.S. Sen. Orrin Hatch (2020)

== Vermont ==
Courthouse	City	Image	Street address	Jurisdiction	Dates of use	Named for
U.S. Post Office and Court House	Brattleboro		204 Main Street	D. Vt.	1917–2017; Still in use as a post office.	n/a
U.S. Post Office and Courthouse	Burlington		180 Church Street	D. Vt.	1870–? Later used as the county courthouse; destroyed by fire in 1982.	n/a
U.S. Post Office and Custom House†	Burlington		175 Main Street	D. Vt.	? Now the Chittenden County Superior Courthouse.	n/a
Federal Building, Post Office and Courthouse	Burlington		11 Elmwood Avenue	D. Vt.	1958–present	n/a
U.S. Post Office and Courthouse	Montpelier		87 State St	D. Vt.	1894–1948 razed ca. 1963	n/a
Federal Building, U.S. Post Office and Courthouse	Montpelier		87 State Street	D. Vt.	1964–1996; Still in use as a post office.	n/a
U.S. Courthouse, Post Office, and Custom House^{†}	Newport		217 Main Street	D. Vt.	1904–1948; Now the Orleans County District Court.	n/a
U.S. Court House and Post Office	Rutland		10 Court Street	D. Vt.	1859–1933; Now the Rutland Free Library.	n/a
U.S. Post Office and Courthouse	Rutland		151 West Street	D. Vt.	1933–present	n/a
U.S. Courthouse and Post Office	Windsor		57 Main St.	D. Vt.	1858–1976; Still in use as a post office.	n/a

== Virginia ==
Courthouse	City	Image	Street address	Jurisdiction	Dates of use	Named for
U.S. Post Office and Courthouse	Abingdon		?	W.D. Va.	1890–?	n/a
U.S. Courthouse	Abingdon		180 West Main Street	W.D. Va.	1960–present	n/a
U.S. Custom House and Post Office	Alexandria		?	E.D. Va.	1871–1930; Razed in 1930.	n/a
Martin V.B. Bostetter, Jr. U.S. Courthouse	Alexandria		200 South Washington Street	E.D. Va.	1931–present	Martin V.B. Bostetter
Albert V. Bryan U.S. Courthouse	Alexandria		401 Courthouse Square	E.D. Va.	1995–present	District Court judge Albert V. Bryan
C. Bascom Slemp Federal Building^{†}	Big Stone Gap		401 East Wood Avenue	W.D. Va.	1913–1950; 1978–present	U.S. Rep. C. Bascom Slemp (1978)
U.S. Post Office and Courthouse	Charlottesville		201 East Market Street	W.D. Va.	1907–1980; Now the Jefferson-Madison Regional Library.	n/a
Federal Building and U.S. Courthouse	Charlottesville		255 West Main Street	W.D. Va.	1980–present	n/a
U.S. Courthouse and Post Office	Danville		?	W.D. Va.	1883–1934; Razed in the 1930s.	n/a
U.S. Post Office and Courthouse	Danville		700 East Main Street	W.D. Va.	1934–present	n/a
U.S. Courthouse and Post Office	Harrisonburg		?	W.D. Va.	1889–c. 1930; Razed in the 1930s.	n/a
U.S. Courthouse	Harrisonburg		116 N. Main Street	W.D. Va.	1940–present	n/a
U.S. Courthouse and Post Office	Lynchburg		?	W.D. Va.	1888–1912; Razed in 1912.	n/a
U.S. Post Office and Courthouse	Lynchburg		901 Church Street	W.D. Va.	1912–1933; Now the Monument Terrace Building	n/a
U.S. Post Office and Courthouse	Lynchburg		900 Church Street	W.D. Va.	1933–1980; Now Lynchburg City Hall.	n/a
U.S. Courthouse	Lynchburg		1101 Court Street	W.D. Va.	?–present	n/a
U.S. Post Office, Courthouse and Custom House	Newport News		101 25th Street	E.D. Va.	1938–2007	n/a
U.S. Courthouse	Newport News		2400 West Avenue	E.D. Va.	2007–present	n/a
Owen B. Pickett U.S. Custom House†	Norfolk		101 East Main Street	E.D. Va. D. Va.	1859–1900; Still in use as a custom house.	U.S. Rep. Owen B. Pickett
U.S. Courthouse and Post Office†	Norfolk		235 East Plume Street	E.D. Va.	1900–1934; Later used as City Hall; now part of the Slover Library	n/a
Walter E. Hoffman U.S. Courthouse^{†}	Norfolk		600 Granby Street	E.D. Va.	1934–present	District Court judge Walter Edward Hoffman
U.S. Custom House and Post Office†	Petersburg	Custom House & Post Office, Petersburg, VA	135 North Union Street	E.D. Va.	1858–1938; Now Petersburg City Hall.	n/a
Lewis F. Powell, Jr. U.S. Courthouse^{†}	Richmond		1000 East Main Street	E.D. Va. D. Va. 4th Cir.	1858–1861; 1865–present	Supreme Court Justice Lewis F. Powell, Jr.
Spottswood W. Robinson III and Robert R. Merhige, Jr., Federal Courthouse	Richmond		701 East Broad Street	E.D. Va.	2008–present	Court of Appeals judge Spottswood W. Robinson III and District Court judge Robert R. Merhige, Jr.
U.S. Post Office and Courthouse	Roanoke		?	W.D. Va.	1902–1931; Completed in 1897; building razed.	n/a
U.S. Post Office and Courthouse	Roanoke		210 Church Avenue Southwest	W.D. Va.	1931–? Now privately owned and leased to the Bankruptcy Court for the Western District of Virginia.	n/a
Richard H. Poff Federal Building	Roanoke		210 Franklin Road Southwest	W.D. Va.	?–present Completed in 1975.	Richard Harding Poff
U.S. Custom House†	Wheeling (now West Virginia)		1528 Market Street	W.D. Va. D.W.V. N.D.W.V.	1860–1907; Now a museum, renamed West Virginia Independence Hall.	n/a

== Washington ==
Courthouse	City	Image	Street address	Jurisdiction	Dates of use	Named for
U.S. Post Office & Court House^{†}	Bellingham		104 West Magnolia Street	W.D. Wash.	1913–? Now owned by the city, and still used as a post office	n/a
U.S. Courthouse and Federal Building	Richland		825 Jadwin Avenue	E.D. Wash.	1965–present	n/a
U.S. Courthouse, Custom House and Post Office	Seattle		3rd Avenue and Union Street	W.D. Wash.	1914–? Demolished in 1958.	n/a
Federal Office Building†	Seattle		909 1st Avenue	W.D. Wash.	1932–2004	n/a
William Kenzo Nakamura U.S. Courthouse†	Seattle		1010 Fifth Avenue	W.D. Wash. 9th Cir.	1940–present	Medal of Honor recipient William K. Nakamura (2000)
U.S. Courthouse	Seattle		700 Stewart Street	W.D. Wash.	2004–present	n/a
U.S. Post Office, Courthouse, & Custom House^{†}	Spokane		904 West Riverside Avenue	E.D. Wash.	1909–present	n/a
Thomas S. Foley U.S. Courthouse	Spokane		920 West Riverside Avenue	E.D. Wash.	1967–present	House Speaker Tom Foley
U.S. Post Office, Courthouse, and Custom House†	Tacoma		1102 A Street	W.D. Wash.	1910–1992; Still in use as a post office.	n/a
Tacoma Union Station^{†}	Tacoma		1713 Pacific Avenue	W.D. Wash.	1992–present Constructed in 1911.	NP Railroad Station
Federal Building	Vancouver		500 West 12th Street	W.D. Wash.	1966–present	n/a
U.S. Post Office and Courthouse	Walla Walla		128 North 2nd Avenue	E.D. Wash.	1914–? Still in use as a post office.	n/a
William O. Douglas Federal Building^{†}	Yakima		25 South 3rd Street	E.D. Wash.	1912–present	Supreme Court Justice William O. Douglas

== West Virginia ==
Courthouse	City	Image	Street address	Jurisdiction	Dates of use	Named for
U.S. Courthouse and Federal Building	Beckley		400 Neville Street	S.D.W.Va.	1961–1999; Completed in 1933.	n/a
Robert C. Byrd Federal Building and U.S. Courthouse	Beckley		110 North Heber Street	S.D.W.Va.	1999–present	U.S. Senator Robert Byrd
Elizabeth Kee Federal Building	Bluefield		601 Federal Street	S.D.W.Va.	1911–present	U.S. Rep. Elizabeth Kee (1976)
U.S. Post Office & Court House	Charleston		?	D.W.V. S.D.W.V.	1883–1910; Razed in 1910.	n/a
U.S. Post Office & Court House	Charleston		123 Capitol Street	S.D.W.V.	1911–1965; Now the Kanawha County Public Library.	n/a
U.S. Courthouse and Federal Office Building	Charleston		500 Quarrier Street	S.D.W.V.	1965–1997; Completed in 1961; now privately owned.	n/a
Robert C. Byrd U.S. Courthouse	Charleston		300 Virginia Street East	S.D.W.V.	1997–present	U.S. Senator Robert Byrd
U.S. Courthouse and Post Office	Clarksburg		227 West Pike Street	D.W.V. N.D.W.V.	1888–1932; Later used as the Municipal Building and since demolished.	n/a
U.S. Post Office & Court House	Clarksburg		500 West Pike Street	N.D.W.V.	1932–present	n/a
U.S. Post Office	Elkins		401 Davis Avenue	N.D.W.V.	1918–1970s Now Elkins City Hall.	n/a
Jennings Randolph Federal Center	Elkins		300 3rd Street	N.D.W.V.	?–present	U.S. Sen. Jennings Randolph
Sidney L. Christie Federal Building^{†}	Huntington		845 Fifth Avenue	S.D.W.Va.	1907–present	District Court judge Sidney Lee Christie (1980)
U.S. Courthouse and Post Office†	Martinsburg		300 West King Street	D.W.V. N.D.W.V.	1895–1961; Now The Arts Centre.	n/a
W. Craig Broadwater Federal Building and U.S. Courthouse	Martinsburg		217 West King Street	N.D.W.V.	?–present	District Court judge W. Craig Broadwater (2011)
U.S. Court House & Post Office	Parkersburg		?	D.W.V. N.D.W.V.	1878–1901; 1907–1960s Razed in the 1960s.	n/a
U.S. Courthouse and Federal Building	Parkersburg		425 Juliana Street	S.D.W.Va.	1961–2013	n/a
U.S. Custom House†	Wheeling		1528 Market Street	W.D. Va. D.W.V. N.D.W.V.	1860–1907; Now a museum, renamed West Virginia Independence Hall.	n/a
Federal Building and U.S. Courthouse^{†}	Wheeling		1125 Chapline Street	N.D.W.Va.	1907–present	n/a
U.S. Post Office & Court House	Williamson		2 West 2nd Avenue	S.D.W.Va.	1928–1936; Still in use as a post office.	n/a

== Wisconsin ==
Courthouse	City	Image	Street address	Jurisdiction	Dates of use	Named for
U.S. Post Office & Courthouse^{†}	Eau Claire		500 South Barstow Street	W.D. Wis.	1909–present	n/a
U.S. Post Office & Courthouse	Green Bay		300 East Walnut Street	E.D. Wis.	1909–1950s Now the Brown County Law Enforcement Center.	n/a
U.S. Court House & Post Office	La Crosse		425 State Street	W.D. Wis.	1890–1933; Razed in the 1970s.	n/a
U.S. Court House & Post Office	Madison		?	W.D. Wis.	1871–1929; Razed in 1929.	n/a
Robert M. La Follette, Sr. Post Office Building^{†}	Madison		215 Martin Luther King Jr. Boulevard	W.D. Wis.	1929–? Also known as the Madison Municipal Building.	Robert M. La Follette
Robert W. Kastenmeier U.S. Courthouse	Madison		120 North Henry Street	W.D. Wis.	1984–present	U.S. Rep. Robert Kastenmeier
Federal Building^{†}	Milwaukee		515 East Wisconsin Avenue	E.D. Wis.	1899–present	n/a
U.S. Court House & Post Office	Oshkosh		?	E.D. Wis.	1890–1907; Razed in 1939.	n/a
Old Post Office, Court House, and Custom House	Superior		1401 Tower Avenue	W.D. Wis.	1908–? Now privately owned.	n/a
U.S. Post Office & Courthouse	Wausau		317 1st Street	W.D. Wis.	1938–2000; Now used as apartments.	n/a

== Wyoming ==
Courthouse	City	Image	Street address	Jurisdiction	Dates of use	Named for
Ewing T. Kerr Federal Building and U.S. Courthouse^{†}	Casper		111 South Wolcott Street	D. Wyo.	1932–present	District Court judge Ewing Thomas Kerr (1992)
Public Building	Cheyenne		?	D. Wyo. 8th Cir.	1905–1933; Razed ca. 1966	n/a
Federal Office Building†	Cheyenne		308 West 21st Street	D. Wyo.	1933–1965; Still in use by various federal agencies.	n/a
Joseph C. O'Mahoney Federal Center†	Cheyenne		2120 Capitol Avenue	D. Wyo.	1965-present	U.S. Senator Joseph C. O'Mahoney
Evanston Main Post Office^{†}	Evanston		221 10th Street	D. Wyo.	1908–ca. 1980	n/a
Clifford P. Hansen Federal Courthouse	Jackson		145 East Simpson Street	D. Wyo.	?–2014; Now owned by Teton County	Governor and U.S. Sen. Clifford Hansen
U.S. Post Office and Courthouse^{†}	Lander		177 North 3rd Street	D. Wyo.	1912–early 1990s Now privately owned.	n/a
U.S. Post Office and Court House	Sheridan		45 East Loucks Street	D. Wyo.	1924–? Now privately owned.	n/a
Yellowstone Justice Center	Yellowstone National Park		105 Mammoth Street	D. Wyo.	2008–present	Yellowstone National Park

== United States territories ==
=== Guam ===
Courthouse	City	Image	Street address	Jurisdiction	Dates of use	Named for
District Court of Guam	Hagatna		520 West Soledad Avenue	D. Guam	2000–present	n/a

=== Northern Mariana Islands ===
Courthouse	City	Image	Street address	Jurisdiction	Dates of use	Named for
District Court for the Northern Mariana Islands	Saipan		1671 Gualo Rai Road	D. N. Mar. I.	?	n/a

=== Puerto Rico ===
Courthouse	City	Image	Street address	Jurisdiction	Dates of use	Named for
Clemente Ruiz-Nazario U.S. Courthouse	Hato Rey		150 Carlos Chardon Street	D.P.R.	?–present	First Puerto Rico-born District Court judge Clemente Ruiz Nazario
Miguel Angel García Méndez Post Office Bldg^{†}	Mayagüez		McKinley and Pilar DeFillo Sts	D.P.R.	1937–present	Puerto Rican legislator Miguel A. García Méndez (2007)
Luis A. Ferre U.S. Courthouse & Post Office Bldg	Ponce		Atocha and Guadalupe Streets	D.P.R.	1933–2012	Governor Luis A. Ferré (2003)
Jose V. Toledo Federal Bldg & U.S. Courthouse^{†}	Old San Juan		Plaza de la Marina	D.P.R.	1914–present	District Court judge Jose Victor Toledo (1999)
Luis A. Ferré Courtroom - Southwestern Divisional Office	Ponce		AMCS Building, Suite 222 A 880 Tito Castro Avenue	D.P.R.	2013–present	Governor Luis A. Ferré (2013)

=== Virgin Islands ===
Courthouse	City	Image	Street address	Jurisdiction	Dates of use	Named for
Almeric L. Christian Federal Building	Christiansted		3013 Estate Golden Rock	D.V.I.	?-present	Judge Almeric L. Christian
Ron de Lugo Federal Building and U.S. Courthouse	Charlotte Amalie		5500 Veterans Drive	D.V.I.	?-present	Delegate Ron de Lugo
United States District Courts Building, also known as Hamburg-America Shipping Line Administrative Offices	Charlotte Amalie			D.V.I.	?	

== Key ==
^{†}	Listed on the National Register of Historic Places (NRHP)
^{††}	NRHP-listed and also designated as a National Historic Landmark
^{*}	Formerly listed on the National Register of Historic Places (NRHP)

== See also ==
- List of United States district and territorial courts
- Federal buildings in the United States
