= John F. Seiberling Federal Building and United States Courthouse =

Federal building in Akron, Ohio, United States

- Interactive map of the John F. Seiberling Federal Building and United States Courthouse area

General information
- Status: Completed
- Type: Federal courthouse
- Architectural style: Brutalist
- Location: 2 South Main Street, Akron, Ohio, United States
- Coordinates: 41°05′06″N 81°31′04″W
- Construction started: 1970
- Completed: 1974
- Owner: General Services Administration

Technical details
- Floor count: 6

The John F. Seiberling Federal Building and United States Courthouse is a building located in downtown Akron, Ohio. The building is named after John F. Seiberling, a United States representative from Ohio who helped create the Cuyahoga Valley National Park and served on the House Judiciary Committee that led the impeachment process against Richard Nixon.

The building was constructed in 1974, and is an example of Brutalist architecture. It stands six stories tall. At the urging Congressman William Ayres, the cornerstone for the building was placed during the Nixon Administration, 1970.

The main tenants of the building are the United States District and Bankruptcy Courts, the Sixth Circuit Court of Appeals, the United States Attorney, United States Probation and Pretrial Services, United States Marshals, Internal Revenue Service, Social Security Administration, Veterans Affairs, and the Department of Labor.

== See also ==
- List of United States federal courthouses
