= Hamburg-America Shipping Line Administrative Offices =

- U.S. National Register of Historic Places
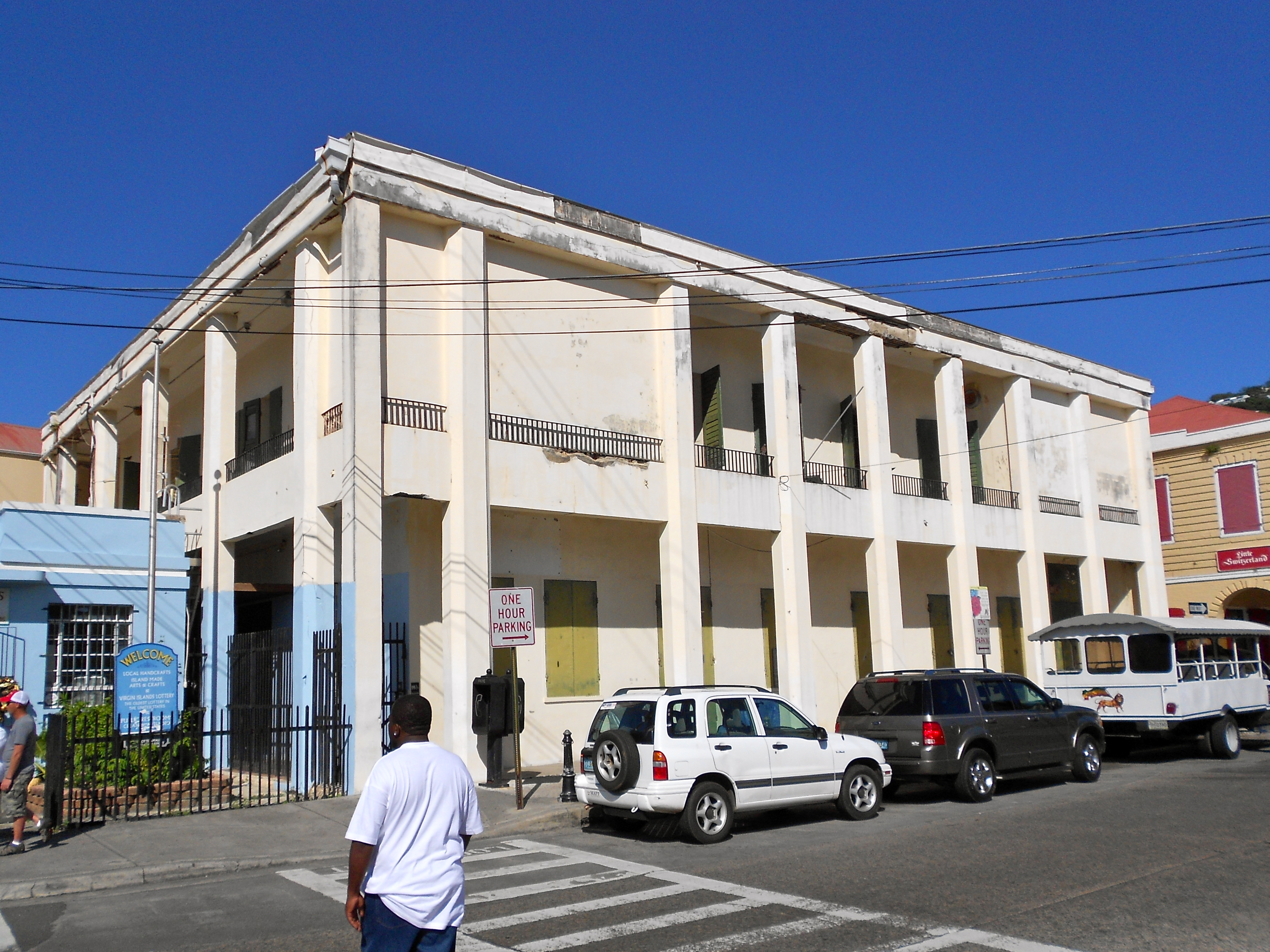

- Location within the U.S. Virgin Islands
- Location: 48B Tolbod Gade, Charlotte Amalie, Virgin Islands
- Coordinates: 18.341667°N 64.931389°W
- Area: 0.2 acres (0.081 ha)
- Built: 1913-1914
- Architect: Fritz Klein
- NRHP reference No.: 78002731
- Added to NRHP: October 10, 1978

The Hamburg-America Shipping Line Administrative Offices, also known as United States District Courts Building, in Charlotte Amalie in Saint Thomas, U.S. Virgin Islands, was built in 1914. It was listed on the National Register of Historic Places in 1978.

It was built for the Hamburg-Amerikanische Packetfahrt Aktien Gesellschaft and held offices for the Superintendent Counsul and also for the Imperial German Consulate. The German connection was lost when the U.S. purchased the Virgin Islands from Denmark just prior to joining World War I against Germany.

It is a two-story reinforced concrete building about 82 by 75 feet (25 m × 23 m) in plan, with eight bays on its east and west facades and six on its south facade.

Designed by German architect Fritz Klein, it is one of the United States' earlier examples of Modern architecture.

In 1978 it housed the U.S. Immigration and Naturalization Service, the U.S. Marshal Service, and the U.S. District Court.
