= Jackson Post Office =

- U.S. National Register of Historic Places
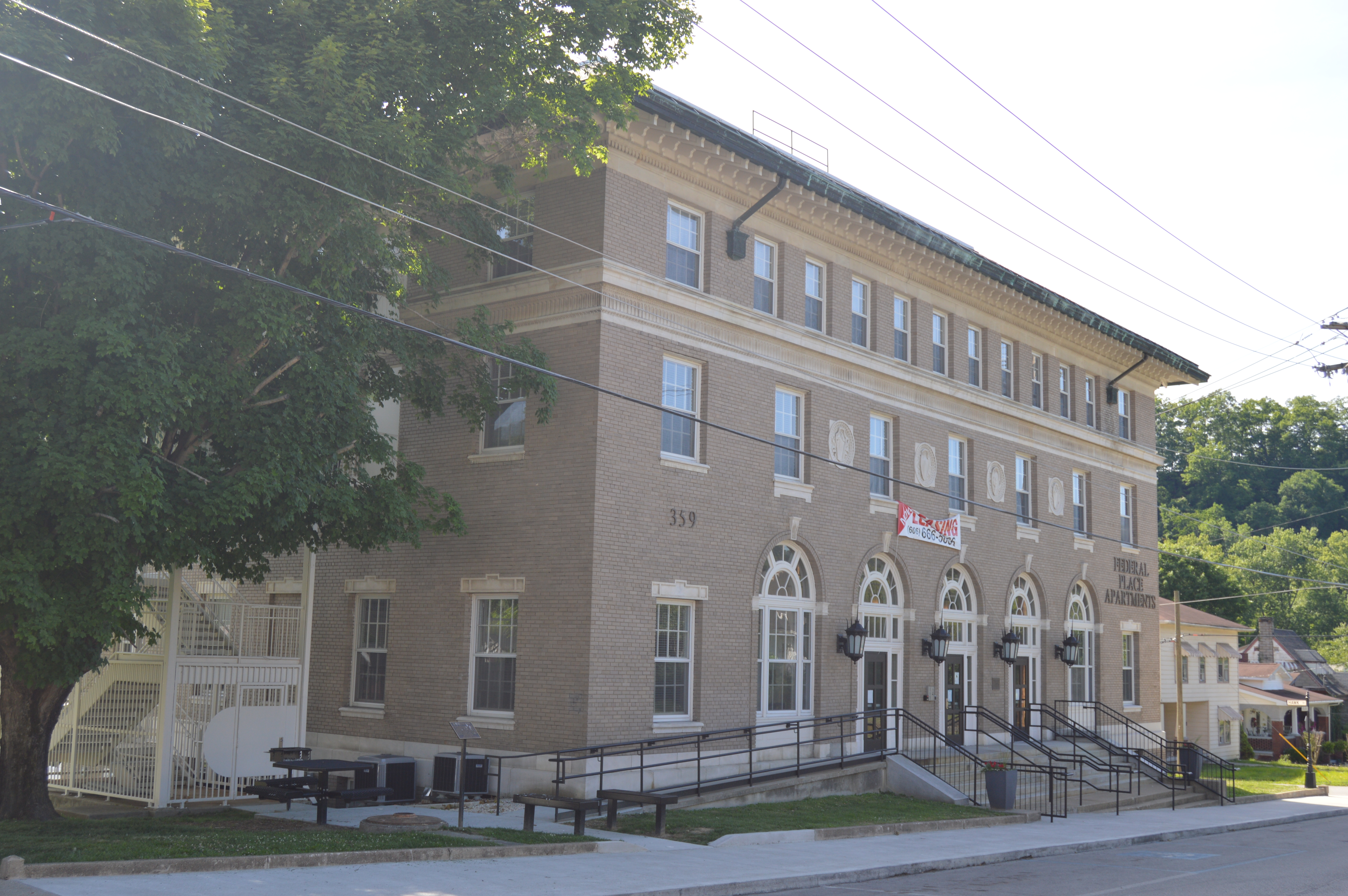

- Location within Kentucky Location within the United States
- Location: 359 Broadway Street, at corner of Hawk and Broadway, Jackson, Kentucky
- Coordinates: 37°33′13″N 83°23′12″W
- Area: less than one acre
- Built: 1916
- Built by: J.S. Rogers Construction Company
- Architect: Oscar Wenderoth
- Architectural style: Late 19th and 20th Century Revivals
- MPS: Jackson MRA
- NRHP reference No.: 90001087
- Added to NRHP: July 23, 1990

The Jackson Post Office in Jackson, Kentucky, at the intersection of Hawk and Broadway, was built in 1916. It was listed on the National Register of Historic Places in 1990.

It is a three-story rectangular light brown brick building. The building, whose design is credited to Oscar Wenderoth, cost $85,000 to build. Besides the post office, it housed a federal courthouse, an Army Recruiting Station, and a county health board. The post office and federal court offices have since relocated away.

The building is now used for apartments.
