= Imagination Station Science Museum =

Imagination Station Science & History Museum
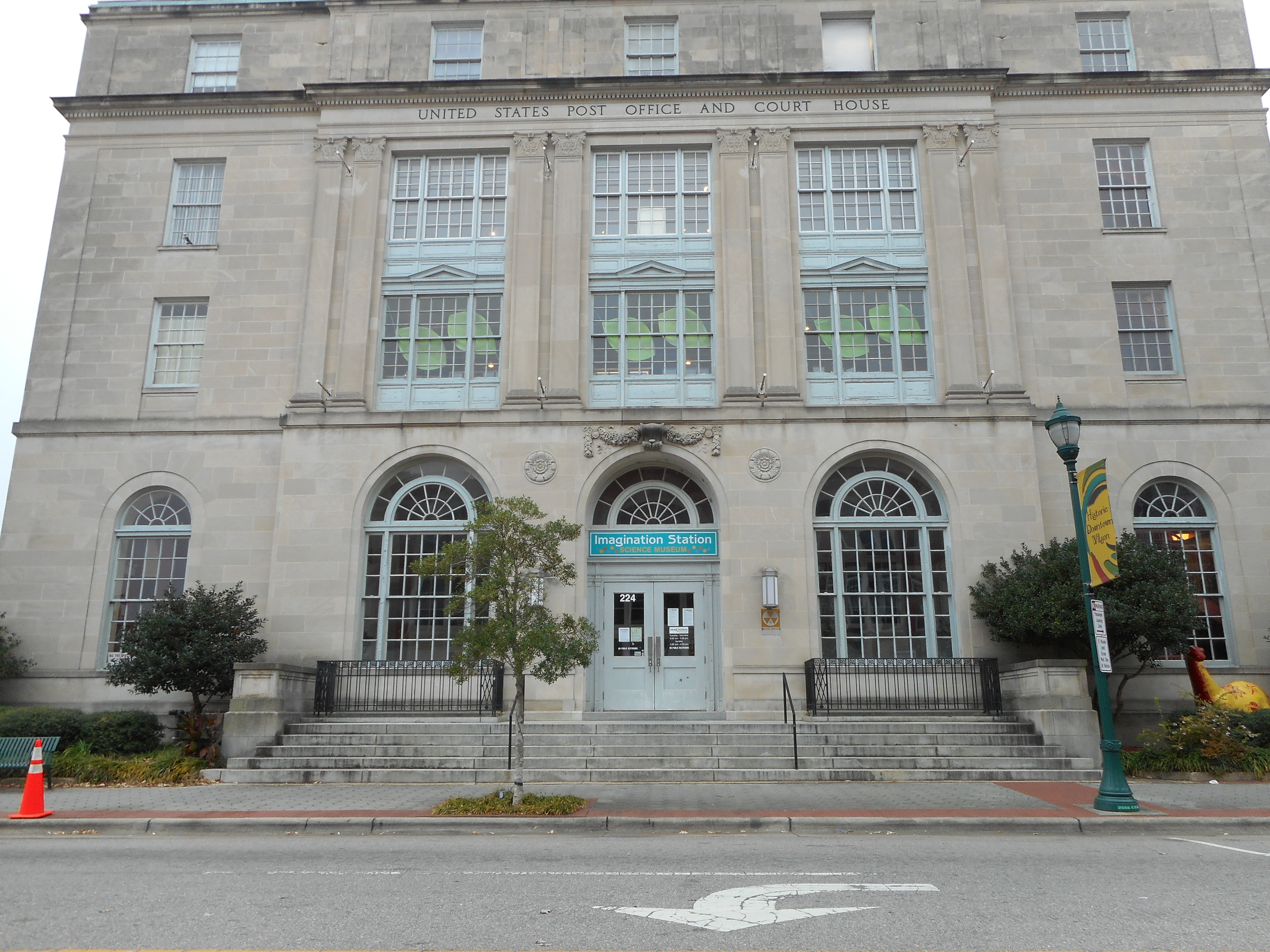
- Established: 1989
- Location: 224 Nash Street SE, Wilson, North Carolina
- Coordinates: 35°43′27″N 77°54′35″W
- Director: Joseph C. Knight

Imagination Station Science Museum is an interactive museum located in downtown Wilson, North Carolina at 224 Nash Street SE. It is housed in the former Wilson Federal Building which served as a post office with a federal courthouse of the United States District Court for the Eastern District of North Carolina from its construction in 1928. One of the former courtrooms serves as the "Science Courtroom", a classroom used for science demonstrations and history programs.

== Timeline ==
1989 Science Museums of Wilson Inc, Imagination Station is founded

1990 Bill F. Streeter becomes the museums first Executive Director

1991 Vincent D. Adkins becomes the museums first Exhibits Manager and Builder

1992 Imagination Station Science Museum Opens To The Public

1994 Jim Henley becomes the museums second Executive Director

1995 Joe Harden becomes interim Executive Director

1996 Todd Boyette becomes the museums third Executive Director

1999 Jerry Reynolds becomes the museums fourth Executive Director

2000 Tropical Trek Exhibit on the museums second floor catches on fire and damages the building

2002 Imagination Station Re-Opens in its original location after operating in another building for two years

2003 Karl L. McKinnon becomes the museums fifth Executive Director.

2007 Jonathan Brooks becomes the museums sixth Executive Director.

2009 North Carolina Museum of The Coastal Plain opens on the third floor of Imagination Station.

2013 Nancy VanDolsen becomes the museums seventh Executive Director.

2019 Jennifer B. Byrd becomes Interim Executive Director.

2020 Jennifer B. Byrd becomes the museums eighth Executive Director.

2023 Brooke Bissette Farmer becomes the museums ninth Executive Director.

2025 The Board of Directors moves into a strategic planning phase that launches a new era for the museum as it moves into its next phase as a children's museum and science center.

2026 Joseph C. Knight becomes the museums tenth Executive Director.

The museum is an independently funded non-profit 501(c)(3) organization that exists to provide informal science education through its exhibits, educational programs, and community events. The museum also offers outreach programs with their Science on Wheels program which brings science demonstrations and workshops to classrooms and organizations across eastern North Carolina.

In the early 2000s, a fire at the building prompted a move to a smaller temporary location four blocks north. The museum has since moved back.
