= J. Bratton Davis United States Bankruptcy Courthouse =

- US Courthouse
- U.S. National Register of Historic Places
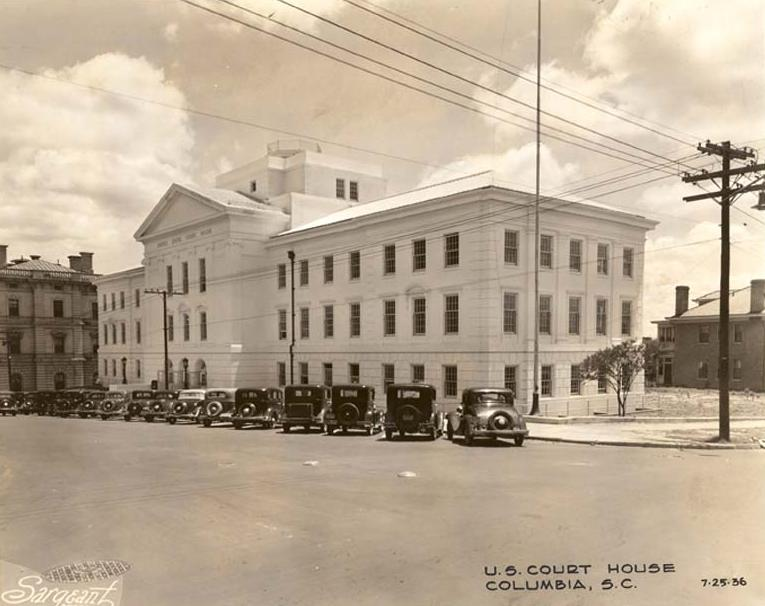
- The courthouse as it appeared in 1936.

- Location within South Carolina Location within the United States
- Location: 1100 Laurel St., Columbia, South Carolina
- Coordinates: 34°0′31″N 81°2′17″W
- Area: 1 acre (0.40 ha)
- Built: 1936
- Architect: Tatum, Harold
- Architectural style: Renaissance
- MPS: Columbia MRA
- NRHP reference No.: 79003375
- Added to NRHP: March 2, 1979

The J. Bratton Davis United States Bankruptcy Courthouse is a courthouse of the United States District Court for the District of South Carolina, located in Columbia, South Carolina. It was originally constructed in 1936, under the supervision of architect Harold Tatum. The courthouse is named for J. Bratton Davis, a bankruptcy judge first appointed in 1978 who later became Chief Judge of the U.S. Bankruptcy Court for the District of South Carolina, and he served in that capacity until 2000.

The building is listed on the National Register of Historic Places, having been added to the list on March 2, 1979.

== History ==
In the summer of 1932, the Postmaster General and Secretary of the Treasury authorized $550,000 (later reduced to $500,000) for the construction of a new courthouse and office building in Columbia, South Carolina. This structure was intended to replace the older Federal Building which had been built in 1875 at 1737 Main Street. The mayor of Columbia began investigating the possible purchase by the city of the old Federal property. The city arranged to exchange the property it owned at the southeast corner of Laurel and Assembly Streets for the Federal Building on Main. The original Federal Building still stands on Main Street as the Columbia City Hall.

The U.S. Courthouse was designed by Harold Tatum in 1935. Tatum was a graduate of the University of Pennsylvania and was one of the few university-trained architects in Columbia. Archibald Brown (possibly representing the Federal Government) was Construction Engineer and James Barnes of Springfield, Ohio was awarded the contract to construct the building.

The building was constructed in 1936. Original electric work was done by Miller Electrical Company of Columbia and Jacksonville, Florida. The concrete work was done by Concrete Construction and Supply Company of Columbia. The original construction photos (which can be found in the building manager's office) were done by Sargeant Studios of Columbia. The building was dedicated on January 18, 1937, and originally housed the U.S. District Court, the Internal Revenue Service, the Justice Department and the District Attorney's Office.

== Architectural description ==
The building's primary significance lies in its architecture rather than its history. Of particular note is the use of poured monolithic concrete as a building material. The use of poured monolithic concrete is common for plain, linear types of buildings (such as warehouses), however it was (and is) unusual for a structure of complex style and detailing to be constructed in this manner.

The building is of the Renaissance Revival style, and has a basement, first, second, and third stories, a partial fourth level on the east and west sides and a partial fifth story with mirador rising from the center of the building. The building is of concrete and masonry construction, with steel and wood roof framing. The exterior walls and trim are all concrete. The building features a rusticated base, rusticated quoins, smooth walls and trabeated fenestration accented with various types of pediments.

The Federal Building derives much of its significance from the method of construction. The building was constructed of poured monolithic concrete. It was the first building to be constructed this way in South Carolina and one of the first in the country to utilize this method of construction.

The front facade is divided into five bays. The central pavilion projects beyond the plane of the facade. It is detailed with six Ionic fluted pilasters which define five bays within the central pavilion. The pilasters support the unenriched entablature and a pediment. The central pavilion divides the front facade into two wings (east and west). The entrance is in the central portion of the building. It consists of three recessed arched openings defined by rusticated voussoirs. Each opening contains a decorative wood fan light. The original wood doors have been replaced with steel ones but the contemporary doors are reminiscent of the original. The concrete platform spans the width of the central pavilion of the building and supports two wrought iron lamposts. The rear facade repeats the pattern of the front.

The center portion of the building contains a rectangular plan fourth level. Crowning the fourth level is a fifth octagonal level which formerly housed a weather station and an observatory tower (the mirador).

The two side facades are divided into five bays with the central bays defined by engaged pilasters of the Tuscan order. The window heads are more pronounced than those at the front and rear.

The fenestration varies at each level. At the first level the windows are eight over eight, double hung, set in a rusticated facade with radiating rusticated voussoirs. The second level openings are detailed with simple molded surrounds except at the central pavilion where the center opening has a broken scroll pediment while the flanking apertures have plain pediments. The center window openings of each end pavilion are detailed with segmented arched pediments and ancons. At the third level, the windows are eight over eight double hung except for the central pavilion where they are twelve over twelve. All the fenestration on the rear (south) facade repeats the pattern of the front except at the third level where the windows are blocked-in at the south side of the courtroom.

The interior of the building has had some alteration since construction. Its most notable feature is the third floor courtroom which appears to be in almost original condition.
