= United States Post Office (Florence, South Carolina) =

- U.S. Post Office
- U.S. National Register of Historic Places
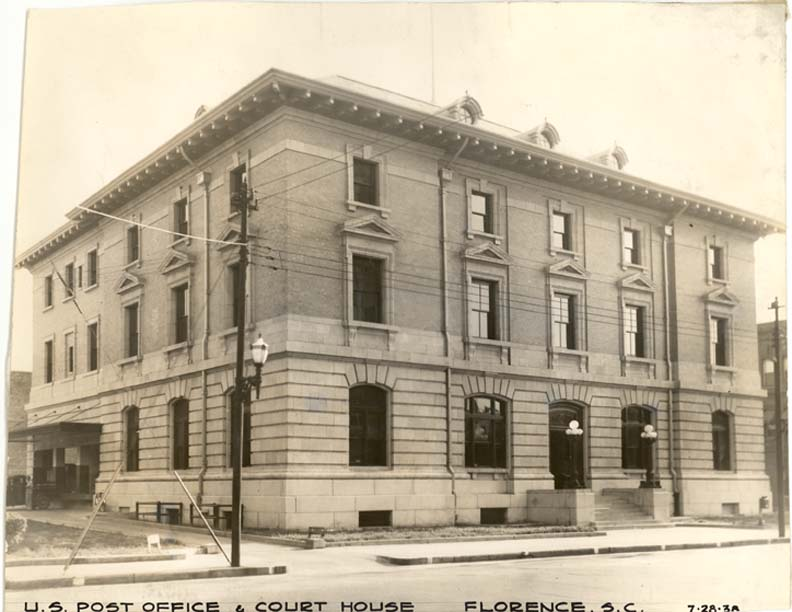
- U.S. Post Office, 1938

- Location within South Carolina Location within the United States
- Location: Irby and W. Evan Sts., Florence, South Carolina
- Coordinates: 34°11′50″N 79°46′7″W
- Area: less than one acre
- Built: c. 1906, c. 1935
- Architectural style: Late 19th And 20th Century Revivals, Second Renaissance Revival
- NRHP reference No.: 77001221
- Added to NRHP: December 21, 1977

U.S. Post Office is a historic post office building located at Florence, Florence County, South Carolina. It was built about 1906, and is a three-story, sandstone and brick building with hipped roof Second Renaissance Revival style. A major three-story addition to the rear of the building was built about 1935.

It was listed on the National Register of Historic Places in 1977.
