= List of United States post offices in Alabama =

United States post offices operate under the authority of the United States Post Office Department (1792–1971) or the United States Postal Service (since 1971). Historically, post offices were usually placed in a prominent location. Many were architecturally distinctive, including notable buildings featuring Beaux-Arts, Art Deco, and Vernacular architecture. However, modern U.S. post offices were generally designed for functionality rather than architectural style.

Following is a list of United States post offices in Alabama. Notable post offices include individual buildings, whether still in service or not, which have architectural, historical, or community-related significance. Many of these are listed on the National Register of Historic Places (NRHP) or state and local historic registers.

Post office	City	Date built	Image	Architect	Notes	Ref.
United States Post Office (Albertville, Alabama)	Albertville	1931			(Note: Listed on the National Register of Historic Places)	
Alexander City Post Office, now the Charles T. Porch Center	Alexander City	1924		Roberts & Company	(Note: Contributing property to the Alexander City Commercial Historic District.) (Note: No longer used as a post office.)	
United States Post Office (Anniston, Alabama)	Anniston	1904–1906		James Knox Taylor		
Old Athens, Alabama Main Post Office	Athens	1933		Britt Alderman		
United States Post Office (Attalla, Alabama)	Attalla	1931		James A. Wetmore		
U.S. Post Office, now Auburn City Hall	Auburn	1933		Charles H. Barnes		
United States Post Office (Birmingham, Alabama), now Robert S. Vance Federal Building and United States Courthouse	Birmingham	1921		James A. Wetmore		
United States Post Office (Demopolis, Alabama)	Demopolis	1914		James Knox Taylor		
Federal Building and United States Courthouse (Dothan, Alabama)	Dothan	1909–1911		James Knox Taylor		
United States Post Office (Fairhope, Alabama)	Fairhope	1932		Marmaduke Dyson		
United States Post Office (Gadsden, Alabama)	Gadsden	1909		James Knox Taylor		
United States Post Office (Greenville, Alabama)	Greenville	1932		James A. Wetmore	(Note: Contributing structure to the Post Office Historic District (Greenville, Alabama).)	
United States Courthouse and Post Office (Huntsville, Alabama)	Huntsville	1932		Edgar Lee Love and Miller, Martin & Lewis		
United States Post Office and Courthouse–Montgomery, now the Frank M. Johnson Jr. Federal Building and United States Courthouse	Montgomery	1932–1933		Frank Lockwood	(Note: Listed as a National Historic Landmark.)	
U.S. Post Office, now G. W. Andrews Federal Building and United States Courthouse	Opelika	1915		James A. Wetmore		
Opp Post Office, now the Opp City Hall	Opp	1938			(Note: Contributing structure to the Opp Commercial Historic District.)	
United States Post Office Building (Selma, Alabama)	Selma	1909		James Knox Taylor.		
Scottsboro Post Office	Scottsboro	1937			(Note: Contributing structure to the Public Square Historic District (Scottsboro, Alabama).)	
Silver Hill Post Office, aka State Bank Silverhill	Silverhill	1925				
Six Mile Post Office (aka Sarah Amanda Trott McKinney House)	Six Mile	c. 1885		W. C. Trott and John McKinney		
