= List of United States federal courthouses in the Eleventh Circuit =

Following is a list of United States federal courthouses in the Eleventh Circuit, which is intended eventually to comprise all courthouses currently or formerly in use for the housing of United States federal courts under the jurisdiction of the United States Court of Appeals for the Eleventh Circuit. Each entry indicates the name of the building along with an image, if available, its location and the jurisdiction it covers, the person for whom it was named, if applicable, and the dates during which it was used as a federal courthouse. Dates of use will not necessarily correspond with the dates of construction or demolition of a building, as pre-existing structures may be adapted or court use, and former court buildings may later be put to other uses. Also, the official name of the building may be changed at some point after its use as a federal court building has been initiated.

== Alabama ==
Courthouse	City	Image	Street address	Jurisdiction	First used	Last used	Notes
Federal Building and U.S. Courthouse^{†}	Anniston		1129 Noble Street	N.D. Ala.	1906	present	
U.S. Court House & Post Office	Birmingham		Second Avenue North and 18th Street	N.D. Ala.	1893	1921	Razed in the early 20th century.
Robert S. Vance Federal Building & U.S. Courthouse^{†}	Birmingham		1800 5th Avenue North	N.D. Ala.	1921	present	Named after Court of Appeals judge Robert Smith Vance in 1990.
Hugo L. Black U.S. Courthouse	Birmingham		1729 Fifth Avenue North	N.D. Ala.	1987	present	Named after U.S. Senator and Supreme Court Justice Hugo Black in 1987.
Seybourn H. Lynne U.S. Courthouse & Post Office	Decatur		400 Well Street	N.D. Ala.	1961	present	Named after District Court judge Seybourn Harris Lynne in 1995.
Federal Building and U.S. Courthouse^{†}	Dothan		100 West Troy Street	M.D. Ala.	1911	present	
John McKinley Federal Building	Florence		210 North Seminary Street	N.D. Ala.	1913	present	Named after U.S. Senator and Supreme Court Justice John McKinley in 1998.
Federal Building & U.S. Courthouse^{†}	Gadsden		600 Broad Street	N.D. Ala.	1910	2012	
U.S. Courthouse and Post Office	Huntsville		Corner of Eustis Avenue and Greene Street	N.D. Ala.	1890	1936	Razed in 1954.
U.S. Courthouse and Post Office^{†}	Huntsville		101 East Holmes Avenue	N.D. Ala.	1936	present	
U.S. Custom House & Post Office	Mobile		107 St. Francis St	S.D. Ala.	1856	1934	Razed in 1963; now the site of the RSA–BankTrust Building.
John Archibald Campbell U.S. Courthouse	Mobile		113 St. Joseph Street	U. S. Bankruptcy	1934	present	Named after Supreme Court Justice John Archibald Campbell in 1981. Housed the Southern District until 2020, then the Bankruptcy court since 2020.
Mobile Federal Courthouse	Mobile		155 St. Joseph Street	S.D. Ala.	2020	present	
U.S. Court House & Post Office	Montgomery		2 South Lawrence Street	M.D. Ala. 5th Circuit	1885	1933	
Frank M. Johnson, Jr. Federal Bldg & U.S. Courthouse^{†}	Montgomery		15 Lee Street	M.D. Ala.	1932	present	Named after District Court judge Frank Minis Johnson in 1992.
G.W. Andrews Federal Building and U.S. Courthouse^{†}	Opelika		701 Avenue A	M.D. Ala.	1918	present	Named after U.S. Rep. George W. Andrews in 1968.
Federal Building & U.S. Courthouse^{†}	Selma		908 Alabama Avenue	S.D. Ala.	1909	present	
U.S. Post Office & Court House	Tuscaloosa		2201 University Boulevard	M.D. Ala.	1910	1968	
Federal Building & U.S. Courthouse	Tuscaloosa		1118 Greensboro Avenue	N.D. Ala.	c. 1968	2011	
U.S. Federal Building and Courthouse	Tuscaloosa		2005 University Boulevard	N.D. Ala.	2011	present	

== Florida ==
Courthouse	City	Image	Street address	Jurisdiction	Dates of use	Named for
U.S. Post Office, Custom House, and Courthouse	Fernandina		401 Centre Street	S.D. Fla. M.D. Fla.	1912–1962; 1962–? Still in use as a post office.	n/a
U.S. Federal Bldg & Courthouse	Fort Lauderdale		299 East Broward Boulevard, Suite 312	S.D. Fla.	1979–present	n/a
U.S. Courthouse & Federal Building	Fort Myers		2110 First Street	M.D. Fla.	1998–present	n/a
George Whitehurst U.S. Courthouse	Fort Myers		2301 First Street	S.D. Fla. M.D. Fla.	1952–1962; 1962–1998; Construction completed in 1933; now used as an arts center.	George William Whitehurst
Old Fort Pierce Post Office	Fort Pierce		500 Orange Avenue	S.D. Fla.	1935–?	n/a
U.S. Courthouse^{†}	Gainesville		25 Southeast 2nd Place	N.D. Fla.	1911–1964; Now in use as the Hippodrome State Theatre.	n/a
U.S. Courthouse	Gainesville		401 SE First Avenue, Room 243	N.D. Fla.	1964–present	n/a
U.S. Post Office & Courthouse	Jacksonville		Hogan & Forsyth Sts.	S.D. Fla.	1895–1933; Razed in 1948	n/a
Ed Austin Building	Jacksonville		311 West Monroe Street	S.D. Fla. M.D. Fla. 5th Cir.	1933–1962; 1962–2003; 1948–1981; Now offices of the State Attorney General	Ed Austin
Bryan Simpson United States Courthouse	Jacksonville		300 North Hogan Street	M.D. Fla. Also a satellite office of the 11th Cir.	2002–present	Court of Appeals Judge John Milton Bryan Simpson
Old Post Office & Customshouse^{†}	Key West		281 Front Street	S.D. Fla.	1891–1932; Now the Key West Museum of Art & History.	n/a
Sidney M. Aronovitz U.S. Courthouse	Key West		301 Simonton Street	S.D. Fla.	1933–present	District Court judge Sidney M. Aronovitz (2009)
U.S. Post Office & Courthouse	Marianna		4396 Lafayette Street	N.D. Fla.	1928–? Still in use as a post office.	n/a
U.S. Post Office, Courthouse, & Customhouse	Miami		100 NE 1st Avenue	S.D. Fla.	1914–1932; Now privately owned.	n/a
David W. Dyer Federal Building & U.S. Courthouse	Miami		300 Northeast 1st Avenue	S.D. Fla.	1933–2008	District court judge David W. Dyer
C. Clyde Atkins U.S. Courthouse	Miami		301 North Miami Avenue	S.D. Fla.	?–present	C. Clyde Atkins
Wilkie D. Ferguson, Jr. U.S. Courthouse	Miami		400 North Miami Avenue	S.D. Fla.	2005–present	Wilkie D. Ferguson
James L. King Federal Justice Building	Miami		99 Northeast 4th Street	S.D. Fla.	1996–present	James Lawrence King
Golden-Collum Memorial Federal Building & U.S. Courthouse	Ocala		207 NW Second Street	M.D. Fla.	?–present	Harold Golden and William Edward Collum, the first and last service members from Ocala to die in the Vietnam War
U.S. Post Office & Courthouse	Ocala		?	S.D. Fla.	1909–1956; Razed ca. 1956	n/a
U.S. Post Office & Court House	Orlando		51 East Jefferson Street	S.D. Fla. M.D. Fla.	1941–1962; 1962-1974; Still in use as a post office.	n/a
George C. Young Federal Building & Courthouse	Orlando		80 North Hughey Avenue	M.D. Fla.	1975–present	George C. Young
U.S. Courthouse	Orlando		401 West Central Boulevard	M.D. Fla.	2007–present	n/a
U.S. Courthouse	Panama City		30 West Government Street	N.D. Fla.	?–present	n/a
U.S. Courthouse^{†}	Pensacola		223 South Palafox Street	N.D. Fla.	1887–1939; Now owned by Escambia County	n/a
Winston E. Arnow Federal Building†	Pensacola		100 North Palafox Street	N.D. Fla.	1939–present Now in use by the U.S. Bankruptcy Court for the Northern District of Florida.	District Court judge Winston E. Arnow (2004)
U.S. Courthouse	Pensacola		1 North Palafox Street	N.D. Fla.	1998–present	n/a
Government House†	Saint Augustine		48 King Street	D. Fla. N.D. Fla	1845–1847; 1847-1868; Original building from the Spanish colonial period; now the Government House Museum.	n/a
U.S. Courthouse	Tallahassee		Southeast corner McCarthy & Adams Sts.	N.D. Fla.	1895–1936; Razed in 1964	n/a
U.S. Courthouse	Tallahassee		110 East Park Avenue	N.D. Fla.	1936–? Now in use by the U.S. Bankruptcy Court for the Northern District of Florida.	n/a
Joseph Hatchett United States Courthouse	Tallahassee		111 North Adams Street	N.D. Fla.	1999–present	n/a
U.S. Courthouse Building & Downtown Postal Station^{†}	Tampa		601 North Florida Avenue	S.D. Fla. M.D. Fla.	1905–1962; 1962-2001; Now Meridian Hotel	n/a
Sam M. Gibbons U.S. Courthouse	Tampa		801 North Florida Avenue	M.D. Fla.	1996–present	U.S. Rep. Sam Gibbons
Paul G. Rogers Federal Building & Courthouse	West Palm Beach		701 Clematis Street	S.D. Fla.	1973–present	Paul Grant Rogers

== Georgia ==
Courthouse	City	Image	Street address	Jurisdiction	Dates of use	Named for
C. B. King U.S. Courthouse	Albany		201 West Broad Avenue	M.D. Ga.	?-present	Pioneering African American lawyer C. B. King
U.S. Post Office and Courthouse^{†}	Athens		?	S.D. Ga. M.D. Ga.	1906-1926; 1926-1942	n/a
U.S. Post Office and Courthouse	Athens		115 Hancock Avenue	M.D. Ga.	1942-present	n/a
Elbert P. Tuttle U.S. Court of Appeals Bldg^{††}	Atlanta		56 Forsyth Street NW	11th Cir.	?-present	Court of Appeals judge Elbert Tuttle (1989)
Richard B. Russell Federal Building	Atlanta		75 Spring Street SW	N.D. Ga.	?-present	Governor and U.S. Senator Richard Russell, Jr.
U.S. Post Office and Courthouse	Augusta		500 Ford Street	S.D. Ga.	?-present	n/a
Frank M. Scarlett Federal Building	Brunswick		805 Gloucester Street	S.D. Ga.	?-present	District Court judge Francis Muir Scarlett
U.S. Post Office and Courthouse^{†}	Columbus		120 12th Street	M.D. Ga.	1933-present	n/a
J. Roy Rowland Federal Courthouse	Dublin		100 North Franklin Street	S.D. Ga.	1935-present	U.S. Rep. J. Roy Rowland
United States Courthouse & Federal Building	Gainesville		121 Spring Street SE Room 201	N.D. Ga.	?-present	n/a
William Augustus Bootle Federal Building & U.S. Courthouse	Macon		475 Mulberry Street	M.D. Ga.	?-present	District Court judge William Augustus Bootle (1998)
Lewis R. Morgan Federal Building & U.S. Courthouse	Newnan		18 Greenville Street	N.D. Ga.	?-present	Court of Appeals judge Lewis Render Morgan
United States Courthouse	Rome		600 East First Street	N.D. Ga.	?-present	n/a
Tomochichi Federal Building & U.S. Courthouse^{†}	Savannah		125 Bull Street	S.D. Ga.	1899-present	Creek leader Tomochichi (2005)
Prince H. Preston Federal Building	Statesboro		52 Main Street	S.D. Ga.	?-present	U.S. Rep. Prince Hulon Preston, Jr.
U.S. Courthouse & Post Office	Thomasville		404 North Broad Street	M.D. Ga.	1962-present	n/a
U.S. Post Office and Courthouse	Valdosta		401 N. Patterson Street	M.D. Ga.	?-present	n/a
U.S. Courthouse	Waycross		601 Tebeau Street	S.D. Ga.	1926-1975; Built in 1913; currently vacant.	n/a

== Key ==
^{†}	Listed on the National Register of Historic Places (NRHP)
^{††}	NRHP-listed and also designated as a National Historic Landmark

== See also ==
- List of United States district and territorial courts
