= List of United States federal courthouses in Alabama =

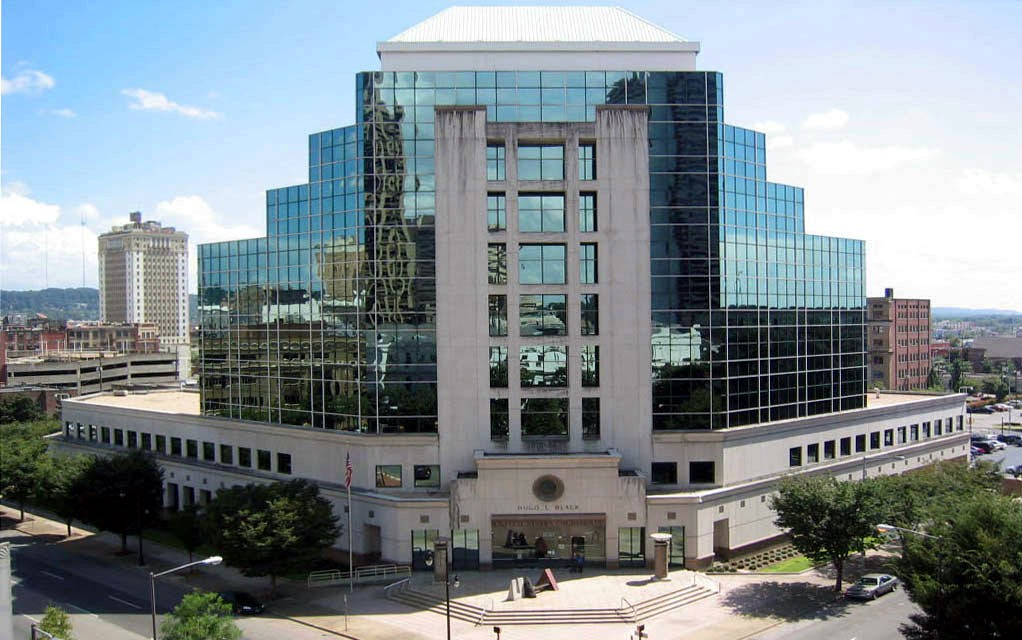
The Hugo L. Black United States Courthouse sits in Birmingham, Alabama.

Following is a list of current and former courthouses of the United States federal court system located in Alabama. Each entry indicates the name of the building along with an image, if available, its location and the jurisdiction it covers, the dates during which it was used for each such jurisdiction, and, if applicable the person for whom it was named, and the date of renaming. Dates of use will not necessarily correspond with the dates of construction or demolition of a building, as pre-existing structures may be adapted for court use, and former court buildings may later be put to other uses. Also, the official name of the building may be changed at some point after its use as a federal court building has been initiated.

== Courthouses ==
Courthouse	City	Image	Street address	Jurisdiction	First used	Last used	Notes
Federal Building and U.S. Courthouse^{†}	Anniston		1129 Noble Street	N.D. Ala.	1906	present	
U.S. Court House & Post Office	Birmingham		Second Avenue North and 18th Street	N.D. Ala.	1893	1921	Razed in the early 20th century.
Robert S. Vance Federal Building & U.S. Courthouse^{†}	Birmingham		1800 5th Avenue North	N.D. Ala.	1921	present	Named after Court of Appeals judge Robert Smith Vance in 1990.
Hugo L. Black U.S. Courthouse	Birmingham		1729 Fifth Avenue North	N.D. Ala.	1987	present	Named after U.S. Senator and Supreme Court Justice Hugo Black in 1987.
Seybourn H. Lynne U.S. Courthouse & Post Office	Decatur		400 Well Street	N.D. Ala.	1961	present	Named after District Court judge Seybourn Harris Lynne in 1995.
Federal Building and U.S. Courthouse^{†}	Dothan		100 West Troy Street	M.D. Ala.	1911	present	
John McKinley Federal Building	Florence		210 North Seminary Street	N.D. Ala.	1913	present	Named after U.S. Senator and Supreme Court Justice John McKinley in 1998.
Federal Building & U.S. Courthouse^{†}	Gadsden		600 Broad Street	N.D. Ala.	1910	2012	
U.S. Courthouse and Post Office	Huntsville		Corner of Eustis Avenue and Greene Street	N.D. Ala.	1890	1936	Razed in 1954.
U.S. Courthouse and Post Office^{†}	Huntsville		101 East Holmes Avenue	N.D. Ala.	1936	present	
U.S. Custom House & Post Office	Mobile		107 St. Francis St	S.D. Ala.	1856	1934	Razed in 1963; now the site of the RSA–BankTrust Building.
John Archibald Campbell U.S. Courthouse	Mobile		113 St. Joseph Street	U. S. Bankruptcy	1934	present	Named after Supreme Court Justice John Archibald Campbell in 1981. Housed the Southern District until 2020, then the Bankruptcy court since 2020.
Mobile Federal Courthouse	Mobile		155 St. Joseph Street	S.D. Ala.	2020	present	
U.S. Court House & Post Office	Montgomery		2 South Lawrence Street	M.D. Ala. 5th Circuit	1885	1933	
Frank M. Johnson, Jr. Federal Bldg & U.S. Courthouse^{†}	Montgomery		15 Lee Street	M.D. Ala.	1932	present	Named after District Court judge Frank Minis Johnson in 1992.
G.W. Andrews Federal Building and U.S. Courthouse^{†}	Opelika		701 Avenue A	M.D. Ala.	1918	present	Named after U.S. Rep. George W. Andrews in 1968.
Federal Building & U.S. Courthouse^{†}	Selma		908 Alabama Avenue	S.D. Ala.	1909	present	
U.S. Post Office & Court House	Tuscaloosa		2201 University Boulevard	M.D. Ala.	1910	1968	
Federal Building & U.S. Courthouse	Tuscaloosa		1118 Greensboro Avenue	N.D. Ala.	c. 1968	2011	
U.S. Federal Building and Courthouse	Tuscaloosa		2005 University Boulevard	N.D. Ala.	2011	present	

=== Key ===
^{†}	Listed on the National Register of Historic Places (NRHP)
^{††}	NRHP-listed and also designated as a National Historic Landmark

== See also ==
- List of county courthouses in Alabama
