= United States Post Office and Court House (Lexington, Kentucky) =

- U.S. National Register of Historic Places
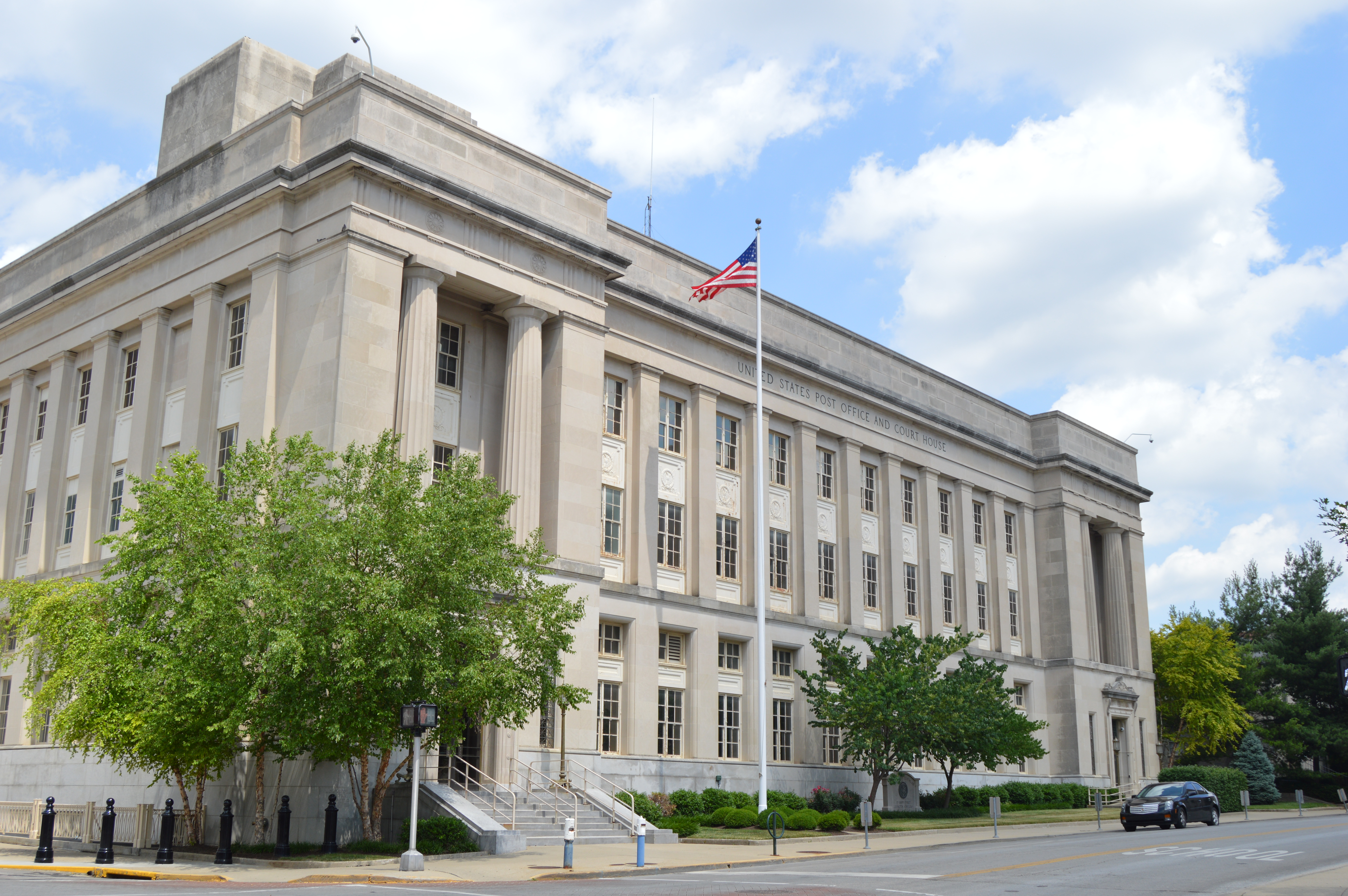
- Front of the courthouse

- Location within Kentucky Location within the United States
- Location: 101 Barr St., Lexington, Kentucky
- Coordinates: 38°2′49″N 84°29′32″W
- Built: 1934
- Architect: Gillig, John T.; Churchill, H.A., et al.
- Architectural style: Classical Revival
- NRHP reference No.: 99000335
- Added to NRHP: March 18, 1999

The United States Post Office and Court House is a courthouse of the United States District Court for the Eastern District of Kentucky located in Lexington, Kentucky. Built in 1934, it was listed on the National Register of Historic Places in 1999.

== Significance ==
The passage of the Public Buildings Act of 1926 instigated a period of building construction that was unprecedented in the United States, including the United States Post Office and Court House in Lexington. The office of the Supervising Architect of the Department of the Treasury, which was responsible for the design of federal buildings in this era, sought employ private architectural firms to ameliorate the effects of the Great Depression on that trade. The Lexington federal building was designed by H.A. Churchill and John T. Gillig and completed in 1934. Many of the federal buildings of this period exhibit streamlined, almost austere, finishes and features; therefore, it is generally believed that Louis Simon, Supervising Architect of the Treasury, exerted a great deal of control over the design.

The building was constructed as a post office, courthouse and federal office building. When the U.S. Post Office moved out, many of the spaces, especially on the 1st floor and lobby area were significantly changed.

== Architectural description ==
The four-story, limestone Classical Revival federal building sits on a granite base. The primary (south) elevation has the concentrated enrichment. This elevation consists of a horizontal balustrade with simple Tuscan capitals and an unenriched entablature, flanked by two monumental pavilions. The pavilions terminate the composition of the south elevation and consist of two 4' diameter, two-story high Doric columns in limestone. The columns rests upon the first floor limestone base, and support an entablature. The dual fluted columns support an enriched entablature consisting of triglyphs interrupted by two stone rosettes, one above each column. This detailing is duplicated at each of the two pavilions. The fourth floor is concealed behind the entablature and cornice. The rear (north) elevation is secondary to the front and side elevations. The plan is typical of many post offices and courthouses of the time. The first floor covers the entire footprint and the upper floors are raised above the first floor in a B plan, where the primary elevation is the front of the B. The three wings which bridge from the front to the back are the east wing; the main ceremonial courtroom, Courtroom A, in the center; and the west wing. This plan results in two interior light courts which serve the interior offices and Courtroom A. The north elevation is the location of the loading dock and, at the northeast corner, the current entry door for the public to the postal sales area of the first floor.

The Lexington federal building has two ornamental, oval-shaped entry lobbies at the southeast and southwest entries. The southeast entry lobby houses the grand staircase, and the southwest lobby the passenger elevators. These oval lobbies originally opened onto the public lobby and, by extension, to the postal lobby of the first floor. The current postal lobby was sealed-off via aluminum doors and the finishes have been completely altered from the original appearance. The southwest (main) entry lobby is an oval-shaped space. The rounded walls are clad with full height polished St. Genevieve Golden Vein marble. The floors are buff terrazzo with brass divider strips and a Westfield Green marble border and base. The panel ceilings are painted plaster with a painted plaster cornice ornamented with a triglyph motif. The elevators are set back in the marble and the original elevator doors are decorative bronze with cast bronze panels featuring an urn motif in the center. The decorative lintels feature egg and dart, dentil and scroll patterns with a modified keystone directly over the elevator doors. The southeast oval-shaped entry lobby contains the main staircase of the building. The finishes of this lobby are the same as the southwest with a couple of exceptions. The main staircase curves into the lobby at the north wall. The stair treads are fine sand-rubbed Appalachian Golden Vein marble; the risers, and stair and wall stringers are polished Appalachian Golden Vein marble. The public lobby is 120' long. The floors are buff terrazzo with Westfield Green marble border and base. The walls are punctuated by a series of marble engaged pilasters supporting a polychrome crown mold band with triglyphs. Between the pilasters is wainscot of polished St. Genevieve Golden Vein marble to a height of 3'.

The public corridors are generally L-shaped except on the fourth floor where the corridors extend around the perimeter of the outside wall. Originally the corridors had terrazzo floors with 8" pink marble borders, plaster ceiling and walls with marble base. The original corridor doors were hollow metal surrounded by metal trim. Many original finishes still exist. The elevator lobbies have the same terrazzo floors with painted plaster walls and ceiling. The elevator doors are framed by Appalachian Golden Vein marble, with the same marble comprising the base at the wall.

Other significant interior spaces are the courtroom, and the original Petit Jury room and rear hall of the third floor. The courtroom and lobby are among the more impressive spaces in the building and are in nearly original condition. The court lobby is set apart from the rest of the east–west corridor of the 2nd floor by its expanded width and by a marble surrounded entry at each end (east and west) of the court lobby. The floors are terrazzo with brass divider strips and pink marble borders. The walls are clad with Appalachian Golden Vein marble to a height of 6' with marble base and wainscot cap. The main courtroom is a large room with 4' wide side aisles separated from the main courtroom by structural columns. The walls are clad with Appalachian Golden Vein marble wainscot with cap to a height of 4'. Behind the judge's rostrum are two sets of double marble engaged pilasters on each on which rests an elaborate, short entablature. Within the entablatures is a frieze ornamented with scrollwork. The caps of the entablatures support a painted plaster arch. The pilasters and an arch frame a niche. The ornamental trabeated ceiling is an important feature of the room. The exposed beams are wood and both the beams and the panels between have stenciling.

Generally the tenant spaces of the Lexington Federal Building are on the first floor (partially), second (except court areas), third and fourth floors. Over the years, the areas given over to tenants have been changed significantly. The basement continues to be used primarily as a service and mechanical area.

== See also ==
- List of United States post offices
