= Sarah Amanda Trott McKinney House =

Historic house in Alabama, United States

- U.S. National Register of Historic Places
- U.S. Historic district
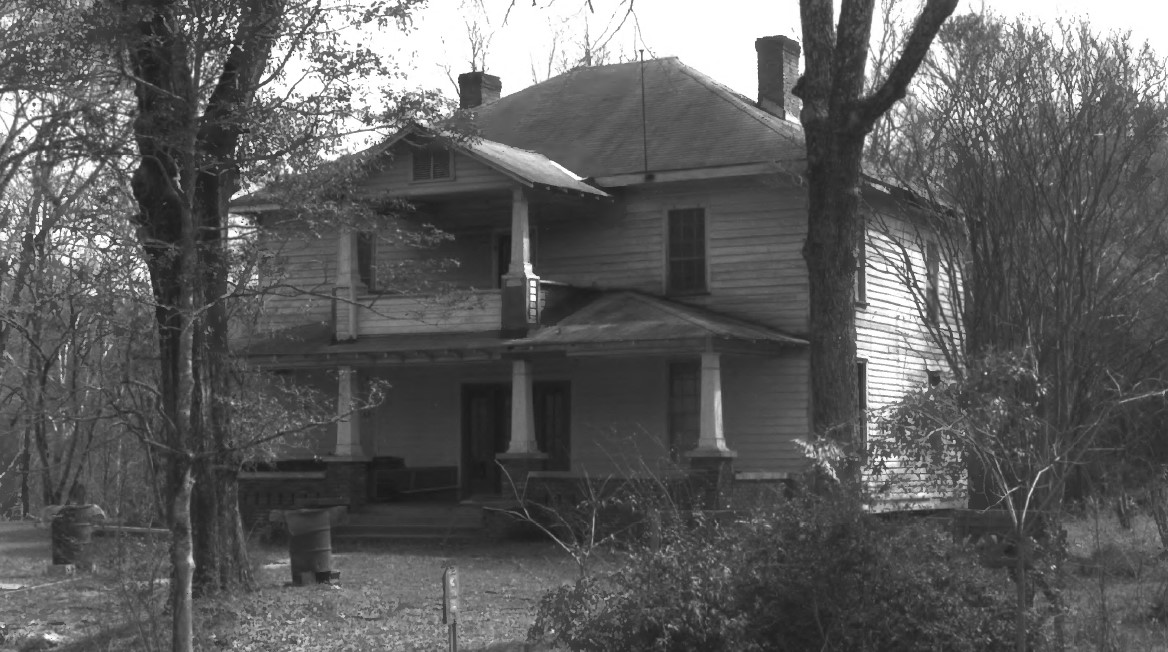
- Sarah Amanda Trott McKinney House in 1992

- Location within Alabama Location within the United States
- Location: AL 25 between Montevallo and Centreville, Sixmile, Alabama
- Coordinates: 33°0′25″N 87°0′18″W
- Area: 10.1 acres (4.1 ha)
- Built: mid 1880s
- Architect: Trott, W.C.; McKinney, John
- Architectural style: Four-over-four
- NRHP reference No.: 92000626
- Added to NRHP: May 29, 1992

The Sarah Amanda Trott McKinney House is a historic house site and 10.1-acre (4.1 ha) historic district in Sixmile, Alabama, United States.

The two-story, center hall house was built for Sarah Amanda Trott McKinney by her brother, W.C. Trott, and her son, John McKinney, during the mid-1880s. Her husband, H.C. McKinney, was wounded during the American Civil War and an invalid prior to his death in 1879. Sarah McKinney was a teacher at the Six Mile Academy, which sat a few hundred feet south of the house, and boarded students in her home. When the school burned in 1897, classes were held in the McKinney House until a school was built.

The Langston family acquired the house around the turn of the 20th century. They ran the Six Mile Post Office out of the house from 1900 until 1906, before moving it into one of their stores across the road. It remained in that family until it was purchased by John Frost Farrington in 1966. The Farrington family moved out of the house in 1983 and sold it to Geoffrey Wilder in 1990.

It was added to the National Register of Historic Places on May 29, 1992.
