= Public Buildings Act =

- Other short titles: Public Buildings Act of 1926
- Long title: An Act To provide for the acquisition of sites and the erection of certain public buildings in the District of Columbia and elsewhere, and for other purposes
- Enacted by: the 69th United States Congress

Citations
- Public law: Pub. L. 69–284
- Statutes at Large: 44 Stat. 630

Codification
- Titles amended: 40

Legislative history
- Introduced in the House as H.R. 6559 by Richard N. Elliott; Committee consideration by House Public Buildings and Grounds; Passed the House on; Passed the Senate on; Signed into law by President Calvin Coolidge on May 25, 1926

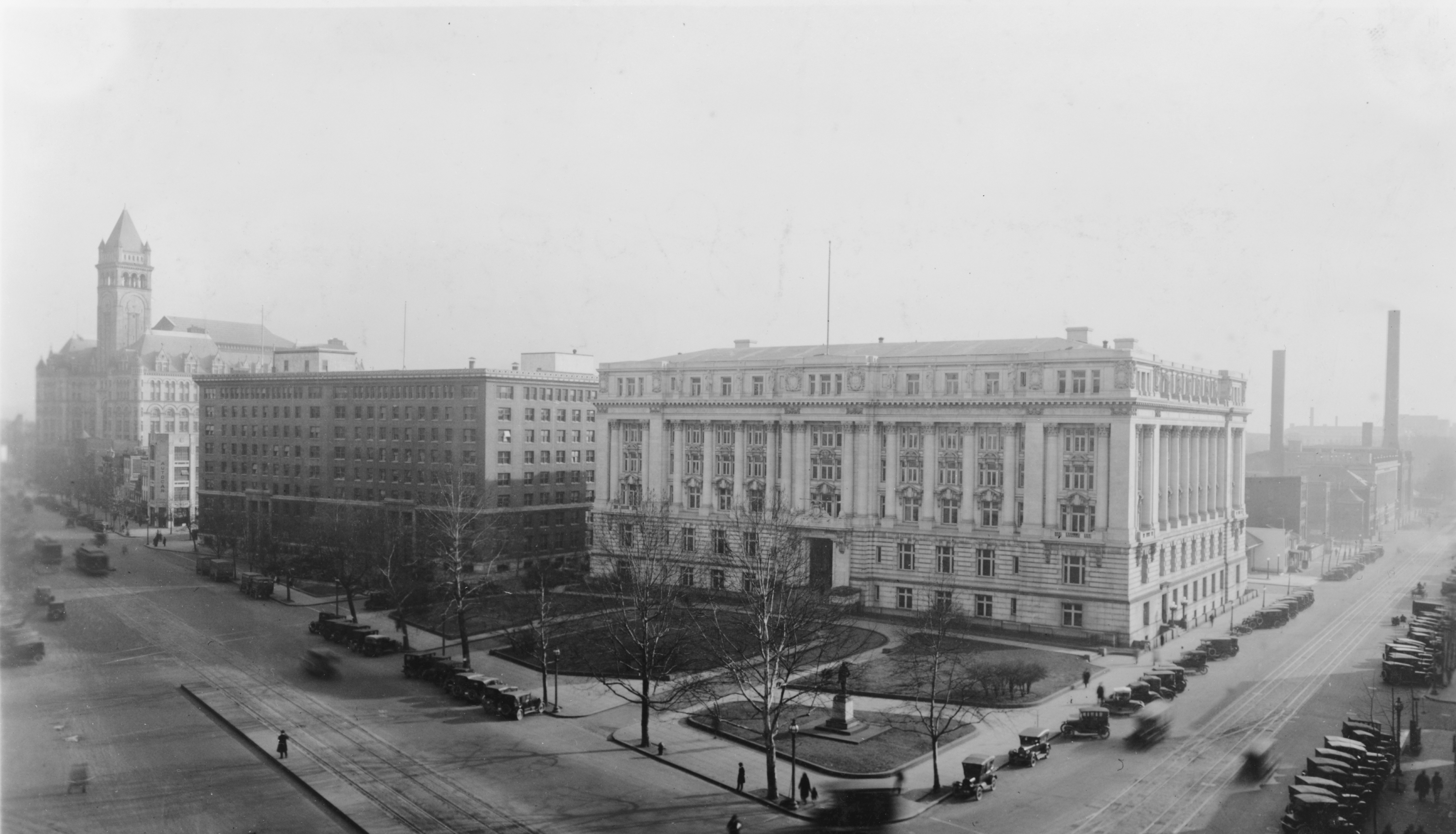
Buildings of Federal Triangle under construction in 1932, pursuant to the Public Buildings Act

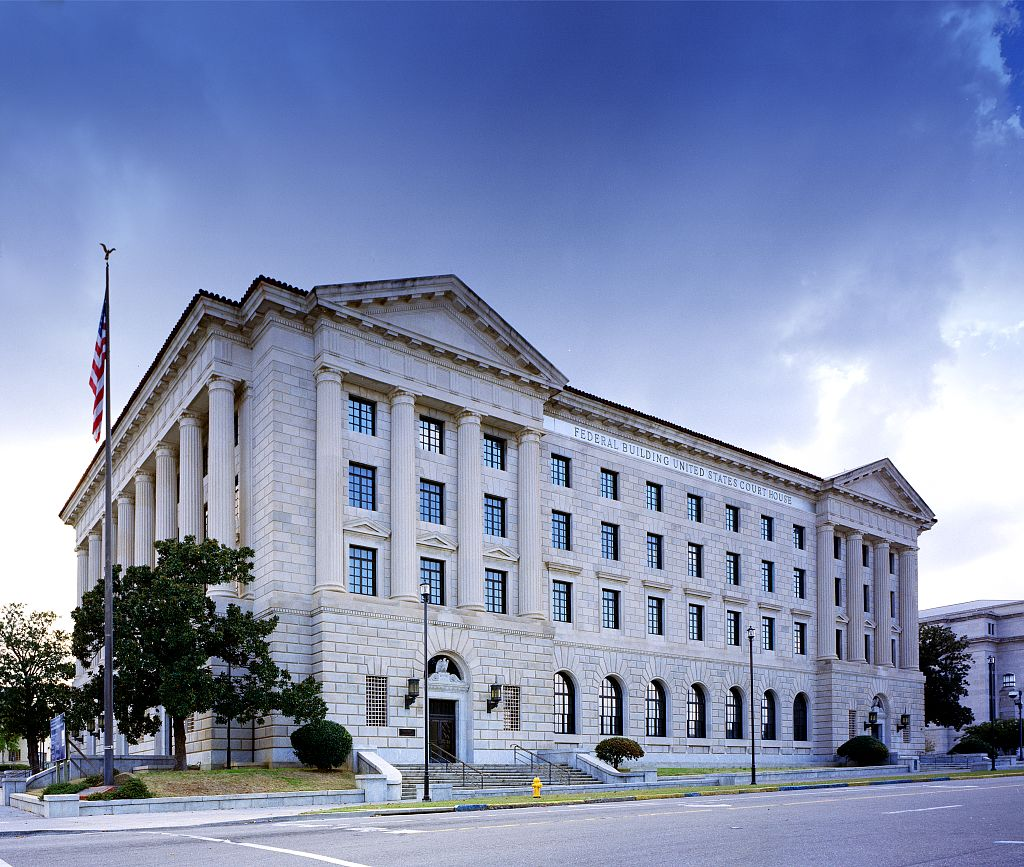
Frank M. Johnson Jr. Federal Building and United States Courthouse, Alabama

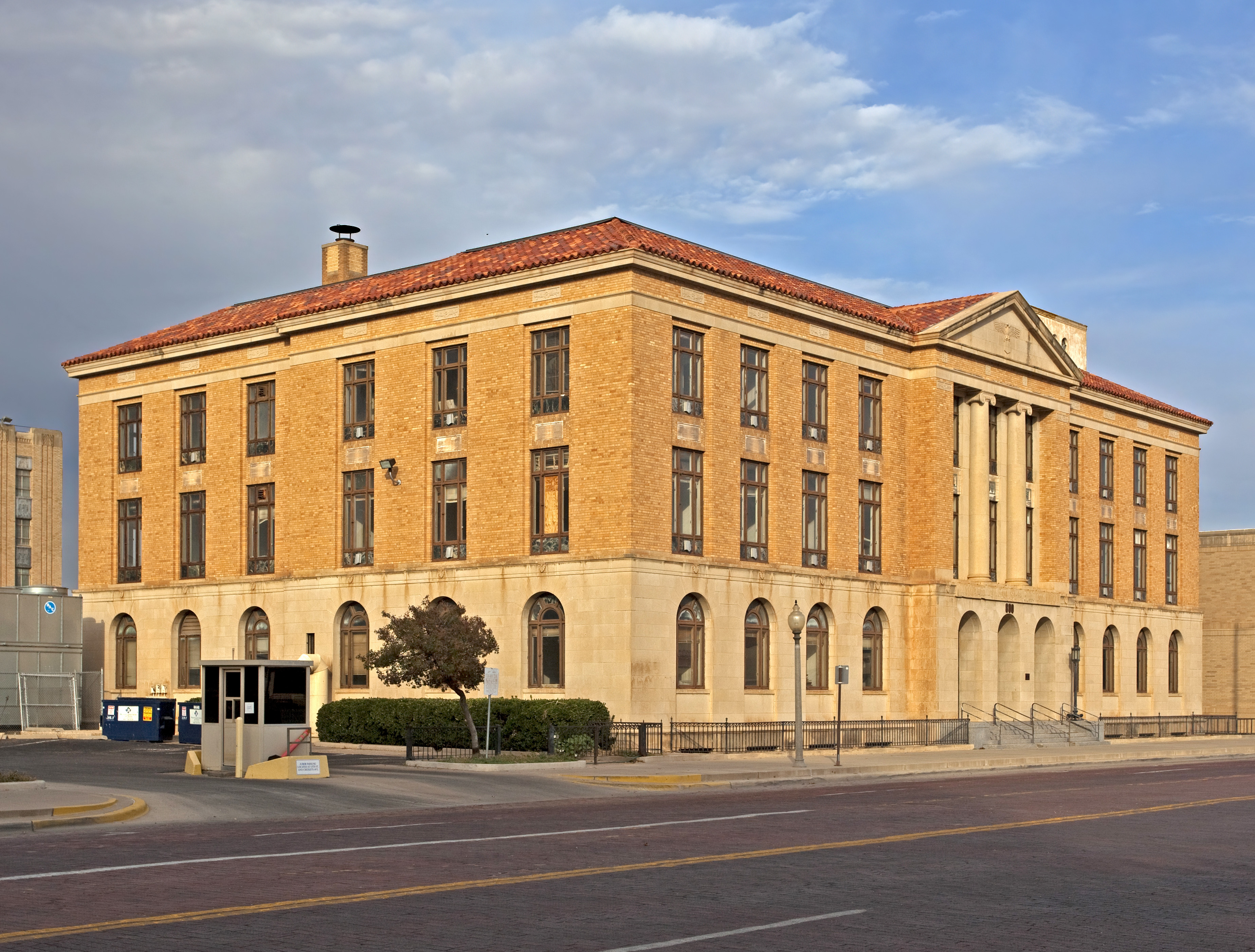
Lubbock Post Office and Federal Building, Texas

The Public Buildings Act of 1926, also known as the Elliot–Fernald Act, was a statute which governed the construction of federal buildings throughout the United States, and authorized funding for this construction. Its primary sponsor in the House of Representatives was Representative Richard N. Elliott of Indiana (who served on the House Committee on Public Buildings and Grounds), and its primary sponsor in the Senate was Bert M. Fernald of Maine (who served on the Senate Committee on Public Buildings and Grounds.

Congress had provided funding for no federal buildings between 1913 and 1926. The U.S. federal government had struggled with the need to build a number of large governmental office buildings since the mid-1910s, but little had been done. In January 1924, the Public Buildings Commission (an independent agency of the executive branch) recommended that a new series of federal office buildings be built near the White House. President Calvin Coolidge asked the United States Congress for legislation and funds in his message of December 9, 1924. The House passed a $150 million construction bill in February 1925, but the bill died in the Senate a month later. The legislation was reintroduced on January 8, 1926. The House passed the measure on February 15. The measure proved highly contentious in the Senate. After much debate, the Senate adopted the bill along with an amendment offered by Sen. William Cabell Bruce of Maryland which restricted construction of government buildings in Washington, D.C., to sites south of Pennsylvania Avenue. The bill went into a House–Senate conference committee, so that the differences between the two bills could be reconciled. The conference committee report recommended inclusion of the "Bruce amendment". The Senate accepted the conference committee's bill on May 17, 1926, and the House did so on May 19. President Coolidge signed the bill into law on May 25, 1926.

The legislation contained three major provisions:

1. An appropriation of $15 million to carry out building construction authorized in 1913, but never funded.
2. An appropriation of $50 million to be used to construct federal office buildings in Washington, D.C.
3. An appropriation of $100 million to be used to construct federal office buildings and post offices throughout the country.

The legislation required Congressional approval of any expenditure in the nation's capital. It also restricted the executive branch from spending more than $10 million annually in the District of Columbia, and more than $5 million annually in any single state. The legislation authorized the United States Department of the Treasury to begin construction on the Federal Triangle complex of buildings, purchase land for a new Supreme Court of the United States building, construct a major extension of the United States Government Printing Office building on North Capitol Street in the District of Columbia, and significantly widen B Street NW on the north side of the National Mall (eventually renamed Constitution Avenue).

Buildings constructed outside the District of Columbia under the Act include:

- The Frank M. Johnson Jr. Federal Building and United States Courthouse in Montgomery, Alabama
- The E. Ross Adair Federal Building and United States Courthouse in Fort Wayne, Indiana
- The United States Post Office and Courthouse in Dubuque, Iowa
- The United States Post Office and Court House in Lexington, Kentucky
- The William R. Cotter Federal Building in Hartford, Connecticut
- The United States Post Office and Courthouse in Dallas, Texas
- The Lubbock Post Office and Federal Building in Lubbock, Texas
- The United States Post Office and Courthouse in Las Vegas, Nevada

Congress amended the Act in 1930 to permit private (not just federally employed) architects to bid on design contracts, and agreed to fund the construction of the Justice, Labor/ICC, National Archives, and Post Office buildings.

The Act was challenged in part in United States v. Carmack, wherein the United States Supreme Court upheld the challenged provisions, holding that the federal government had the constitutional authority to condemn land containing buildings owned by a state government.
