= Post Office Historic District (Greenville, Alabama) =

Historic district in Alabama, United States

- U.S. National Register of Historic Places
- U.S. Historic district
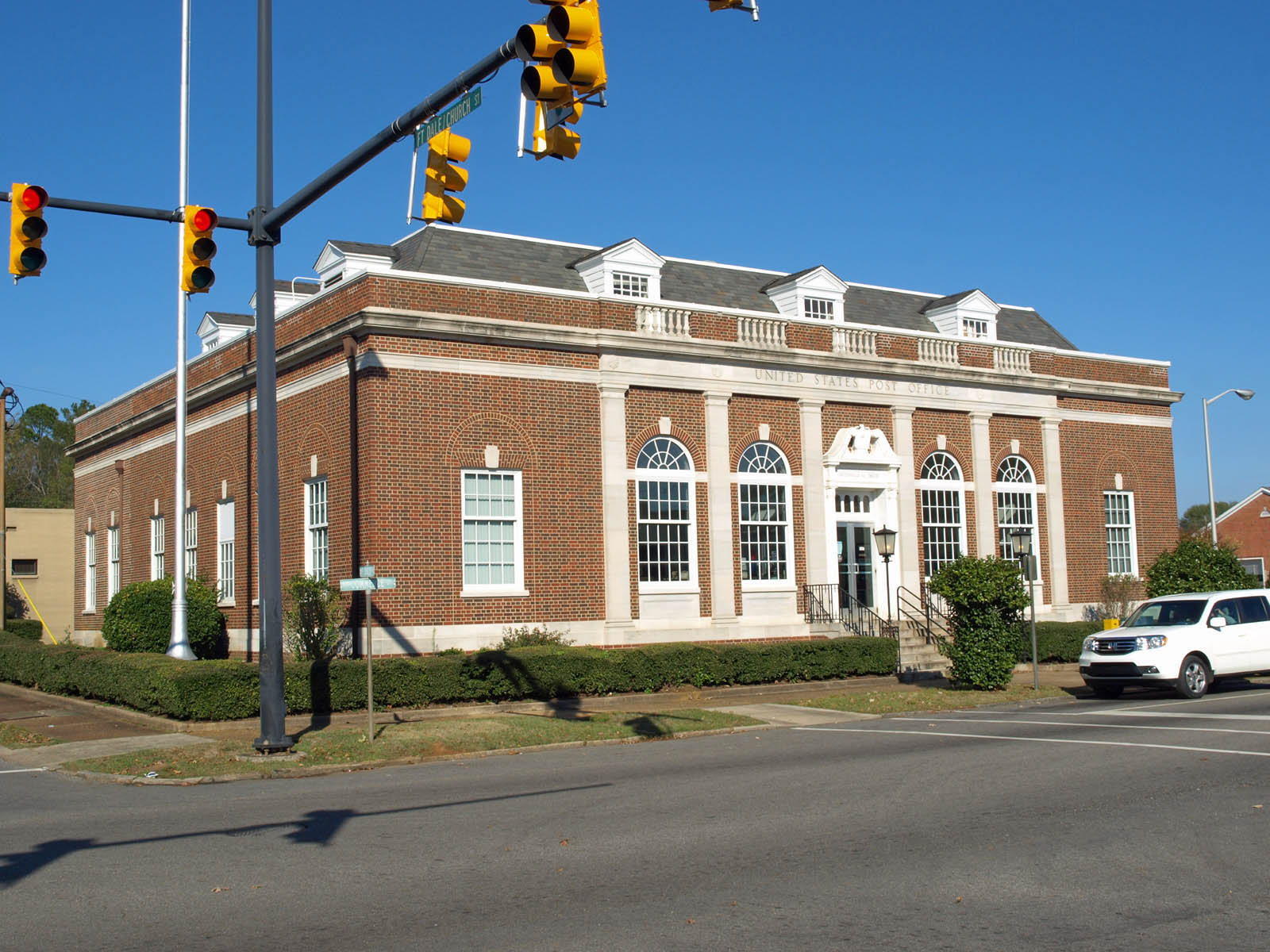
- The Post Office in November 2013

- Location within Alabama Location within the United States
- Location: 100–115 W. Commerce and 101 E. Commerce Sts., Greenville, Alabama
- Coordinates: 31°49′46″N 86°37′28″W
- Area: 2.5 acres (1.0 ha)
- Architectural style: Early Commercial, Classical Revival, Art Deco
- MPS: Greenville MRA
- NRHP reference No.: 86001968
- Added to NRHP: November 04, 1986

The Post Office Historic District is a historic district in Greenville, Alabama, United States, at 100–115 West Commerce and 101 East Commerce Streets. It was listed on the National Register of Historic Places in 1986 and includes Early Commercial architecture, Classical Revival architecture, and Art Deco architecture in its nine contributing buildings.

== Gallery ==
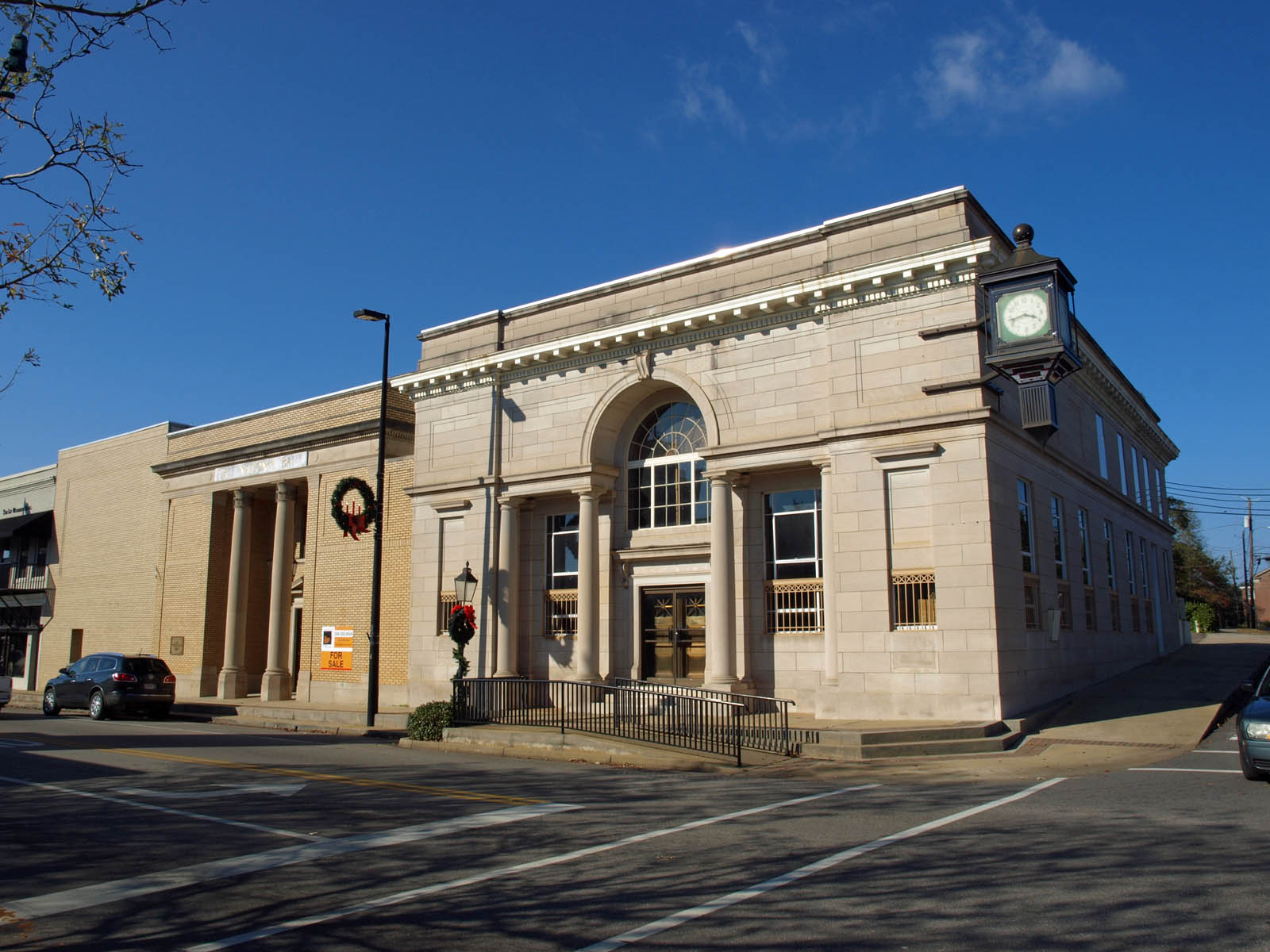
The First National Bank

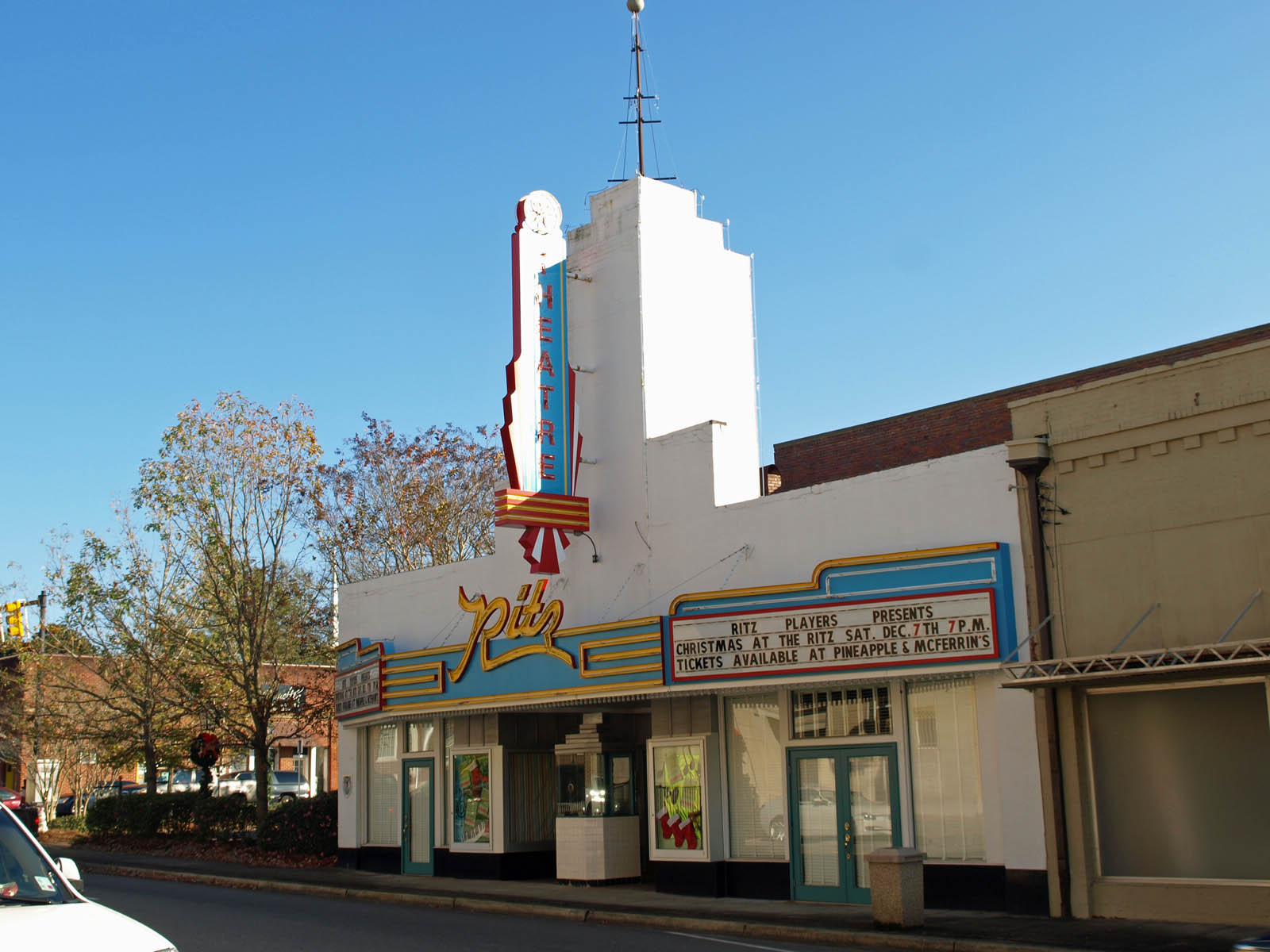
The Ritz Theatre

== See also ==
- List of United States post offices
