= United States Post Office (Albertville, Alabama) =

- U.S. Post Office
- U.S. National Register of Historic Places
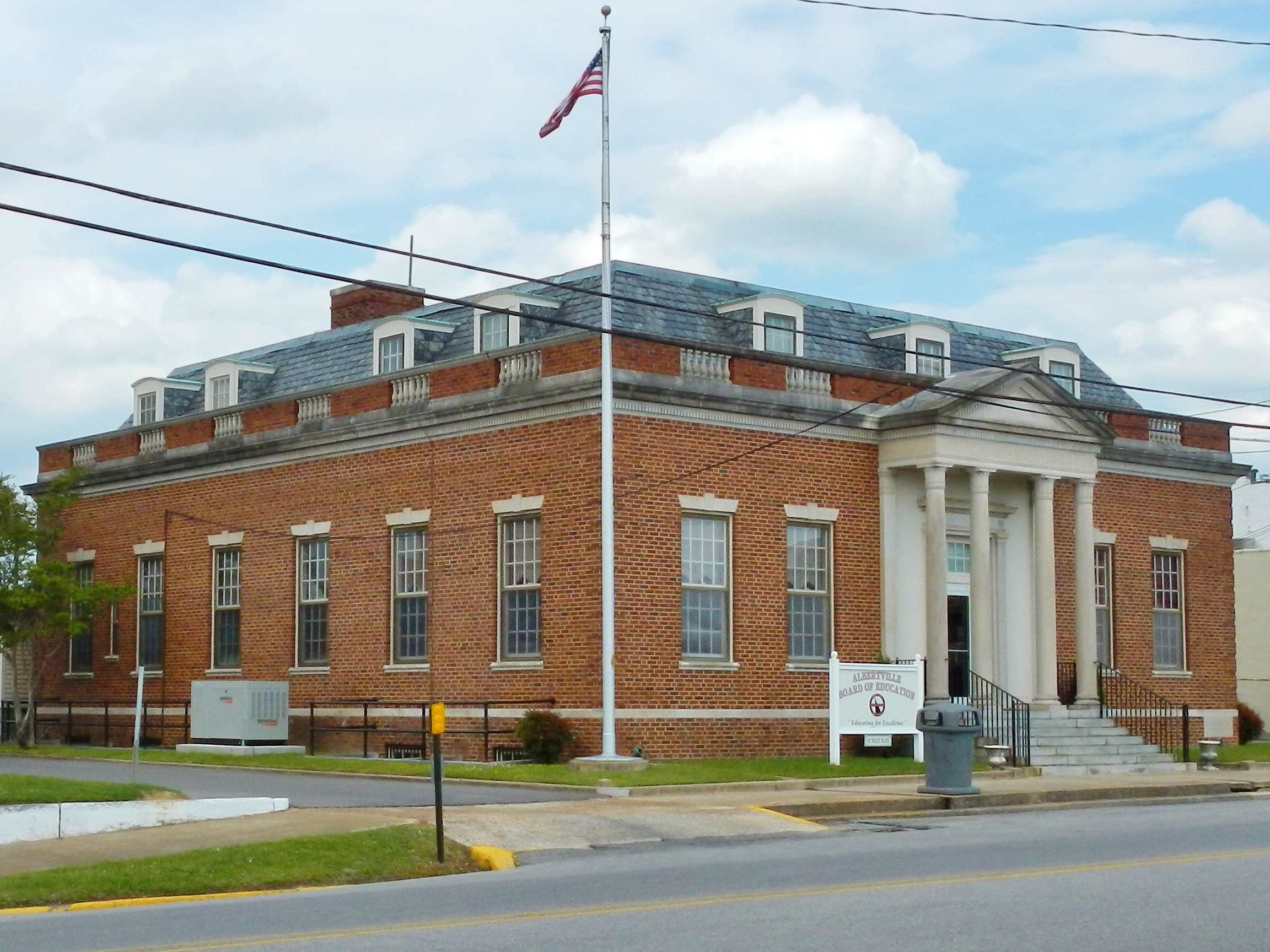
- The old post office building currently serves as the Albertville Board of Education building.

- Location within Alabama Location within the United States
- Location: 107 W. Main St., Albertville, Alabama
- Coordinates: 34°16′6″N 86°12′43″W
- Area: 0.7 acres (0.28 ha)
- Built: 1931
- NRHP reference No.: 83002980
- Added to NRHP: June 21, 1983

The U.S. Post Office is a former post office building located at 107 W. Main St. in Albertville, Alabama. The post office was built in 1931; while files at the post office claim it was a Works Progress Administration building, the organization did not exist in 1931. The two-story brick building has a mansard-styled roof with a green slate exterior and dormers on the front and rear. The front entrance has a single-story portico supported by Doric columns. The building's roofline features a frieze, cornice, boxed eaves, and a parapet with a balustrade. It was listed on the National Register of Historic Places in 1983.

== See also ==
- List of United States post offices
