= United States Post Office (Demopolis, Alabama) =

- U.S. Post Office
- U.S. National Register of Historic Places
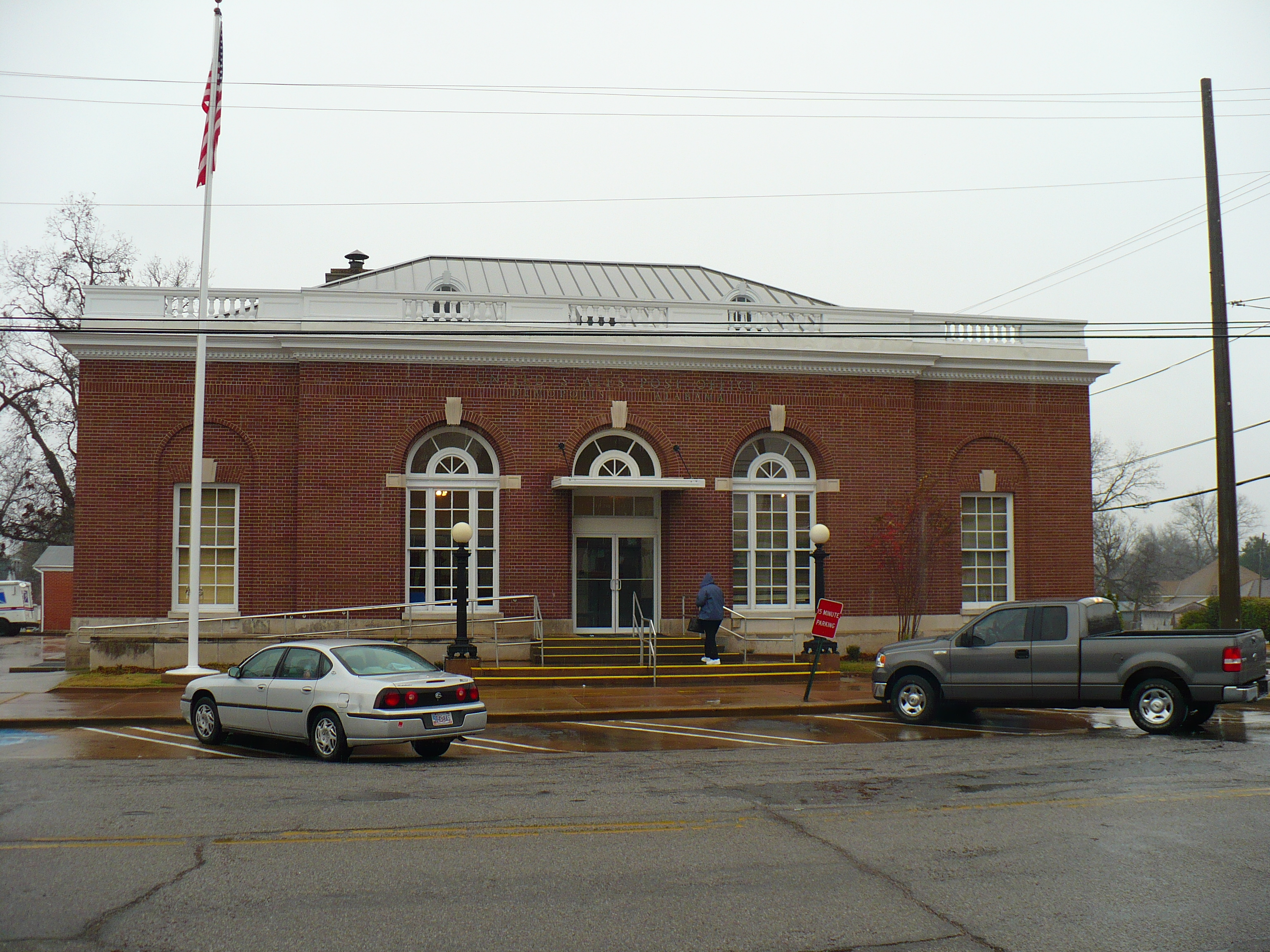
- The Demopolis Post Office in 2008

- Location within Alabama Location within the United States
- Location: 100 W Capitol St, Demopolis, Alabama
- Coordinates: 32°31′6″N 87°50′16″W
- Built: 1914
- Architect: Anderson, A. & Co.; James Knox Taylor
- NRHP reference No.: 84000657
- Added to NRHP: July 28, 1984

The U.S. Post Office in Demopolis, Alabama is a historic post office. It was built in 1914 in a Jeffersonian Neoclassical style. The facade is granite and brick with five arched bays, the three central bays feature Palladian windows. The roof line is crowned with a vasiform balustrade. The interior is marble. The building was added to the National Register of Historic Places on July 28, 1984, due to its architectural significance.

== See also ==
- List of United States post offices
