= United States Post Office (Fairhope, Alabama) =

- U.S. Post Office
- U.S. National Register of Historic Places
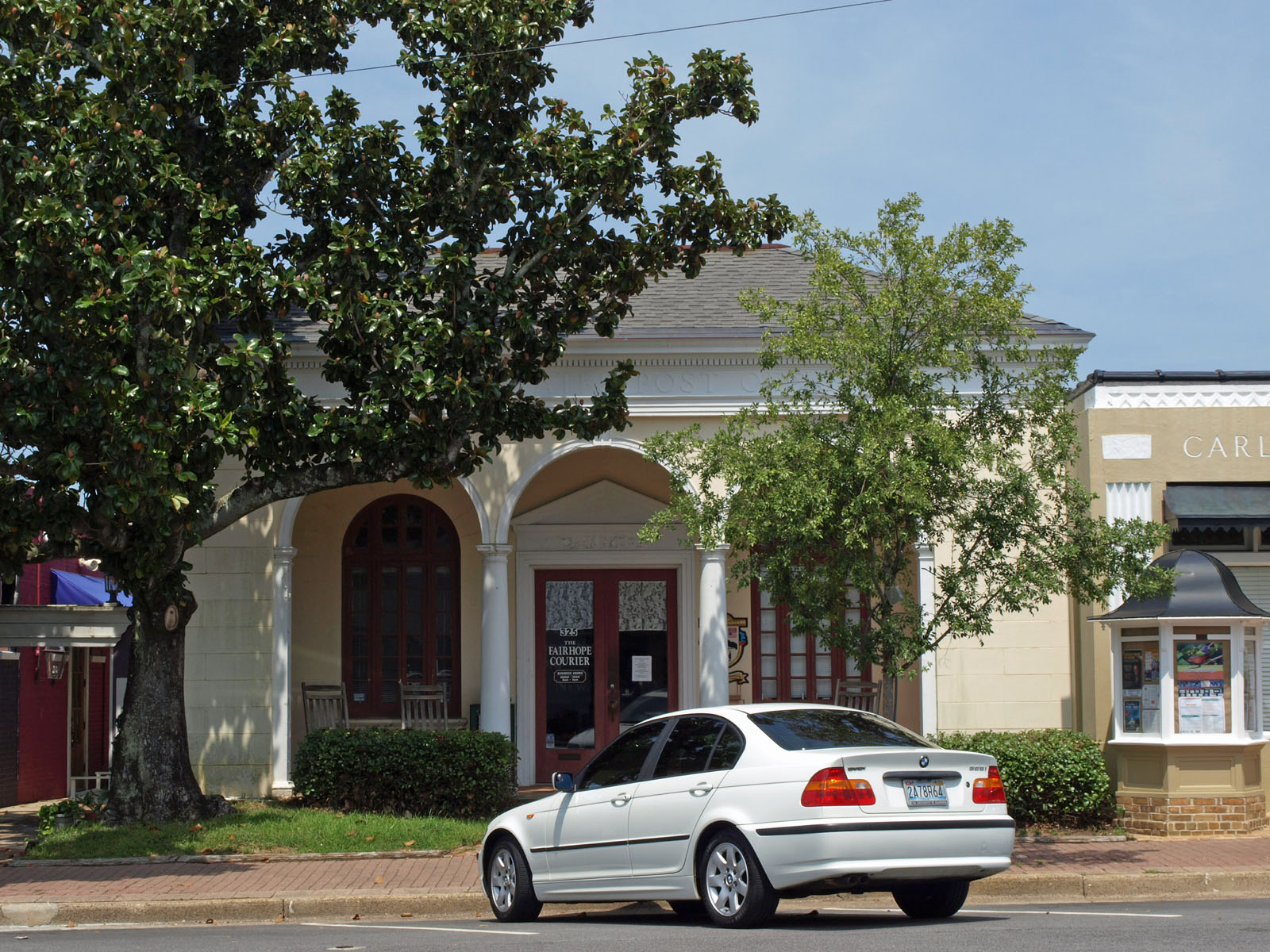
- The building in September 2012

- Location within Alabama Location within the United States
- Location: 325 Fairhope Ave., Fairhope, Alabama
- Coordinates: 30°31′23″N 87°54′15″W
- Area: less than one acre
- Built: 1932
- Architect: Marmaduke Dyson, M. Dyson and Co.
- Architectural style: Italian Renaissance Revival
- MPS: Fairhope MRA
- NRHP reference No.: 88001001
- Added to NRHP: July 1, 1988

The United States Post Office in Fairhope, Alabama, is a historic United States Post Office building built in 1932, in the Italian Renaissance Revival architectural style. It currently houses the offices of the Fairhope Courier. The building was listed on the National Register of Historic Places in 1988.

== See also ==
- List of United States post offices
