= Alexander City Commercial Historic District =

Historic district in Alabama, United States

- U.S. National Register of Historic Places
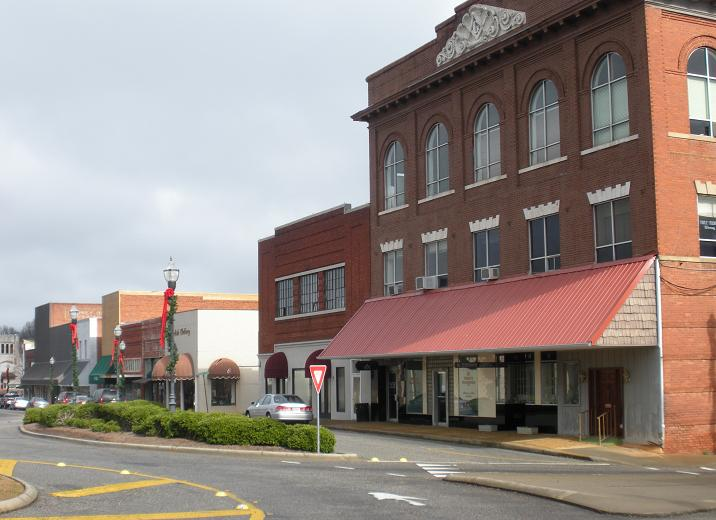
- Buildings along Main St., including Graves Furniture building and Masonic Lodge building (at right)

- Location within Alabama
- Location: Portions of Broad, Main, Green, Alabama, Jefferson Sts. and Courthouse Sq., Alexander City, Alabama
- Coordinates: 32°56′44″N 85°57′14″W
- Area: 8 acres (3.2 ha)
- Built: 1902
- Architect: Roberts & Co.
- Architectural style: Commercial block
- NRHP reference No.: 00000711
- Added to NRHP: June 22, 2000

Alexander City Commercial Historic District, in Alexander City, Alabama, is a historic district which was listed on the National Register of Historic Places in 2000. The listing includes 32 contributing buildings and a contributing site on 8 acres (3.2 ha).

The district includes portions of Broad, Main, Green, Alabama, and Jefferson Sts. and it includes Courthouse Square. It includes 17 non-contributing buildings.

It includes Commercial block architecture.

Selected buildings included are:

- City Hall (1974), 4 Court Square, designed in New Formalism style.
- Tallapoosa County Courthouse/Old City Hall (1938), 82 Court Square, designed by Atlanta architects Robert and Company, Inc. An H-shaped brick building.

- Masonic Lodge (c.1915), 115-123 Main, a three-story, two-part commercial block building; it once held the post office.
- Graves Furniture Building (c.1930), 107 Main, a brick two-story, two-part commercial block; it has a flat parapet roof with

concrete dentil coping. "Graves Furniture" no longer appears on front of building.
