= United States Federal Building and Courthouse (Tuscaloosa, Alabama) =

Federal courthouse in Tuscaloosa, Alabama

Coordinates: 33°12′37″N 87°33′47″W

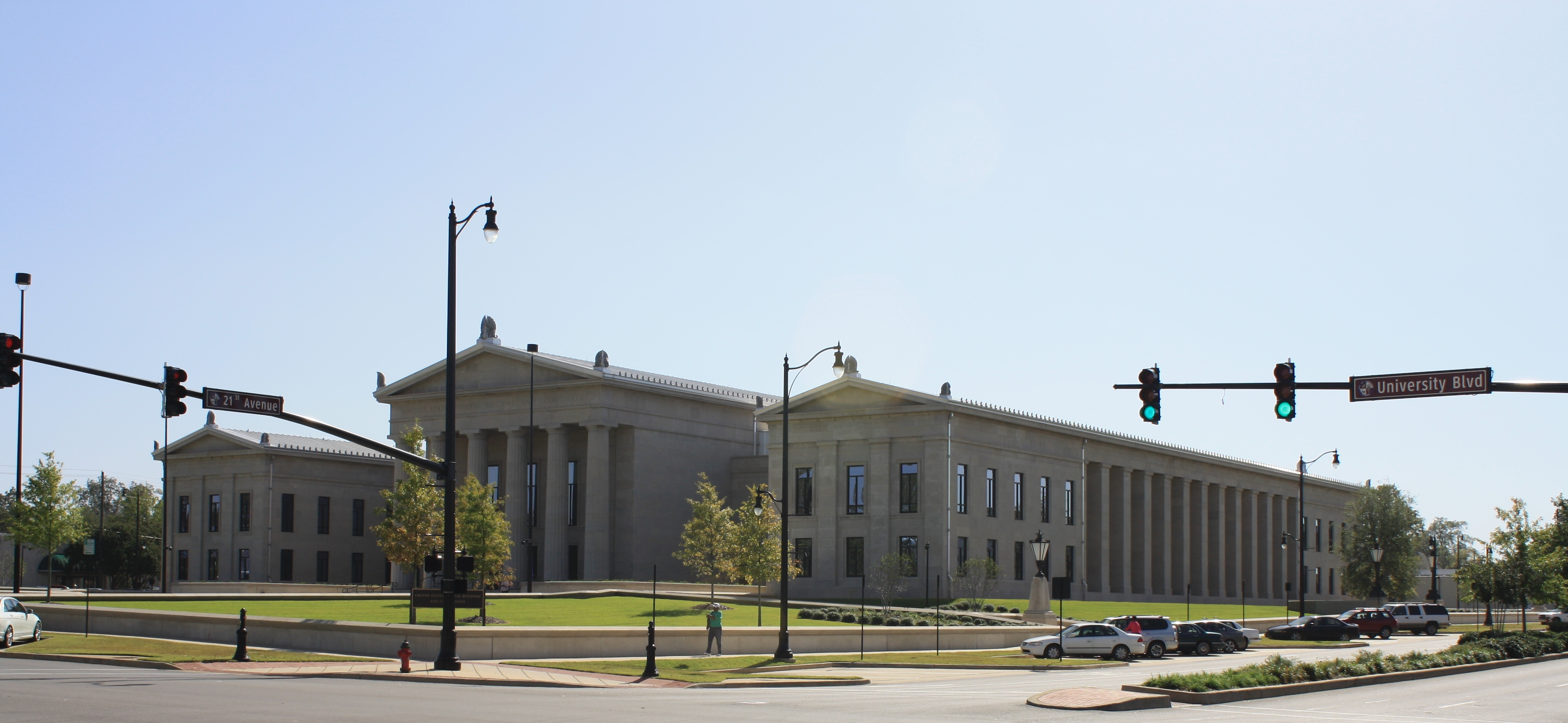
Tuscaloosa Federal Building and Courthouse

The Tuscaloosa Federal Building and Courthouse is a building in downtown Tuscaloosa, Alabama that houses the United States District Court, United States Bankruptcy Court, the U.S. Marshal Service, the Federal Bureau of Investigation, and the offices of the Social Security Administration. It also includes offices for Alabama's senators and congressional representatives.

== History ==
The 127,000-square-foot classical Greek Revival-styled building is part of the U.S. General Services Administration's Design Excellence program. U.S. District Court Judge Scott Coogler was instrumental in the design of the building.

It was designed by the Chicago architectural firm Hammond Beeby Rupert Ainge.

The building won a Palladio Award in 2012.

== See also ==
- List of United States federal courthouses
- New Classical architecture
