= Sixmile, Alabama =

Unincorporated community in Alabama, United States

- Unincorporated community
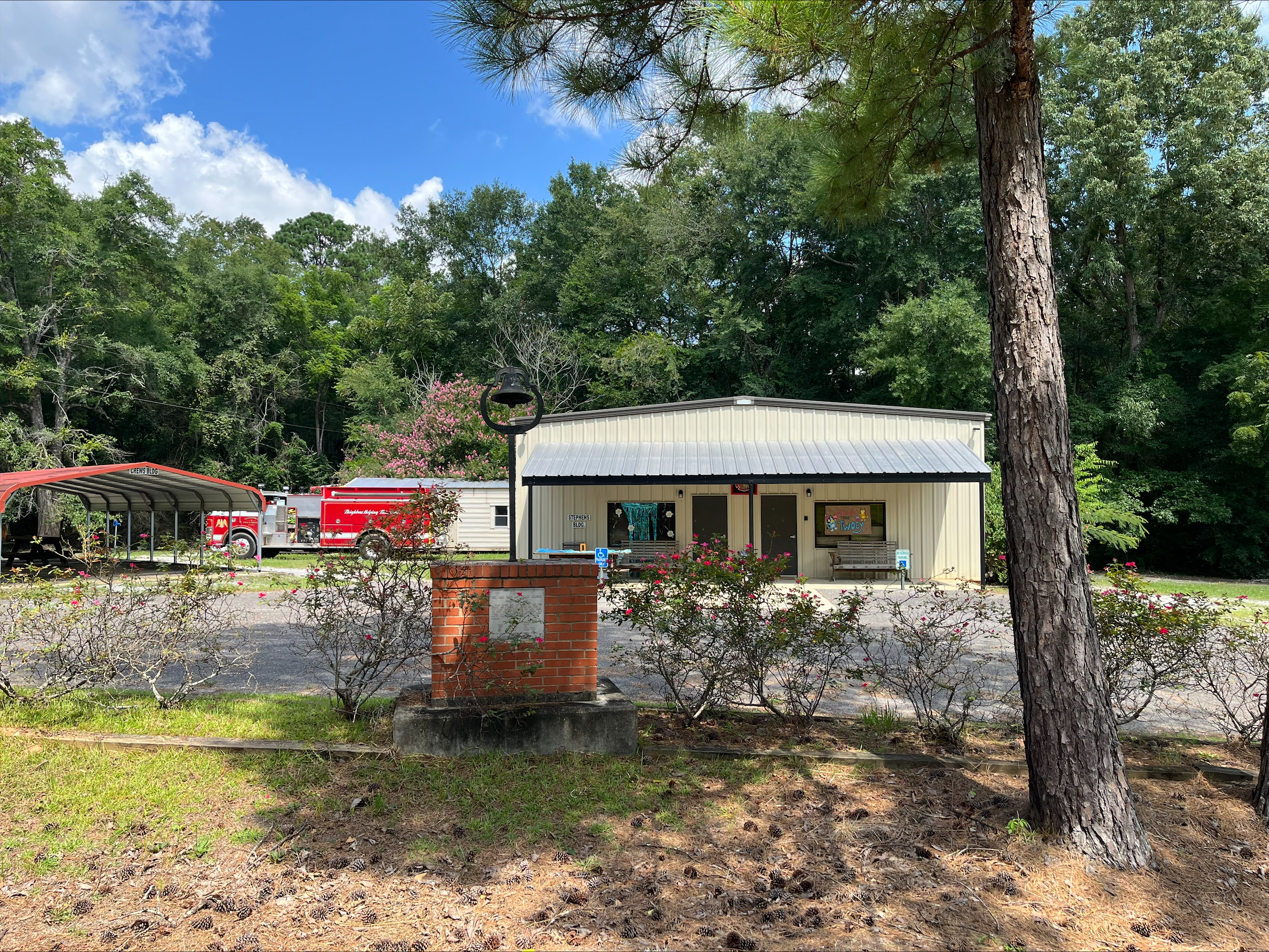
- Sixmile Community Center

- Location within the state of Alabama Sixmile, Alabama (the United States)
- Coordinates: 33.00789°N 87.00554°W
- Country: United States
- State: Alabama
- County: Bibb
- Elevation: 354 ft (108 m)
- Time zone: UTC-6 (Central (CST))
  - Summer (DST): UTC-5 (CDT)
- Area codes: 205, 659

Sixmile, also spelled Six Mile, is an unincorporated community in Bibb County, Alabama, United States.

== History ==
The community is named for Sixmile Creek and was once home to the Sixmile Academy and a forge. A newspaper, the Bibb Blade, began printing in 1879 in Sixmile.

A post office operated under the name Sixmile from 1857 to 1909.
