= Mobile Federal Courthouse =

Courthouse in Mobile, Alabama, U.S.

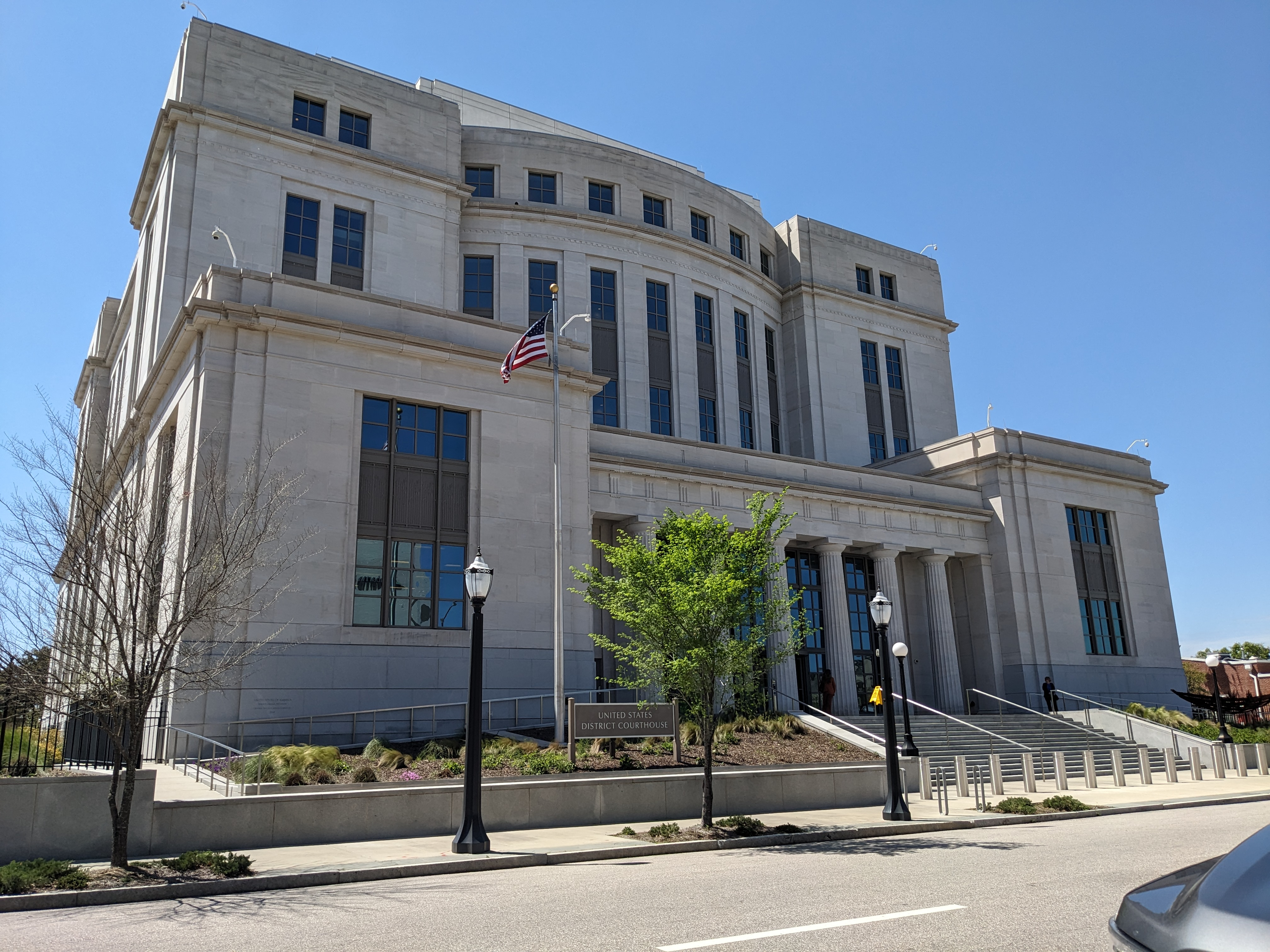
- The courthouse in March 2024
- Interactive map of the Mobile Federal Courthouse area

General information
- Location: 155 St Joseph St, Mobile, AL 36602
- Coordinates: 30°41′40″N 88°02′37″W
- Completed: 2018

Design and construction
- Architecture firm: Hartman–Cox Architects

The Mobile Federal Courthouse is a United States courthouse in Mobile, Alabama, U. S. The courthouse is the home of the United States District Court for the Southern District of Alabama as well as the United States Marshals Service.

Planning for the courthouse began in the early 2000s, and an initial design covering two city blocks was scrapped due to budget cuts. The courthouse opened on July 16, 2018, on a site across St. Louis Street from the John Archibald Campbell U. S. Courthouse. The façade of the new courthouse was built of limestone from the same quarry in Russellville, Alabama, that was used for the Archibald Courthouse 80 years prior.
