= Federal Building and United States Courthouse (Dothan, Alabama) =

- Federal Building and U.S. Courthouse
- U.S. National Register of Historic Places

- Location within Alabama Location within the United States
- Location: 100 W. Troy St., Dothan, Alabama
- Coordinates: 31°13′31″N 85°23′33″W
- Area: less than one acre
- Built: 1909-11; 1952
- Architect: Office of the Supervising Architect
- Architectural style: Classical Revival
- NRHP reference No.: 74000412
- Added to NRHP: December 31, 1974

The Federal Building and U.S. Courthouse, also known as U.S. Post Office and Court House, is a historic government building in Dothan, Alabama, United States.

== Architecture and history ==
The Classical Revival building was begun in 1909 and completed in 1911 to designs by architects and engineers in the Office of the Supervising Architect under James Knox Taylor. It was built to house facilities of the United States District Court for the Middle District of Alabama, the United States Post Office and other federal agencies. In 1952 a plain one-story addition was added in the rear of the building, and in 1962 the post office moved to a new facility. The building is still used as a courthouse.

It was listed on the National Register of Historic Places in 1974.

== See also ==
- List of United States federal courthouses in Alabama
- List of United States post offices
