= John Archibald Campbell United States Courthouse =

- United States Court House and Custom House
- U.S. National Register of Historic Places
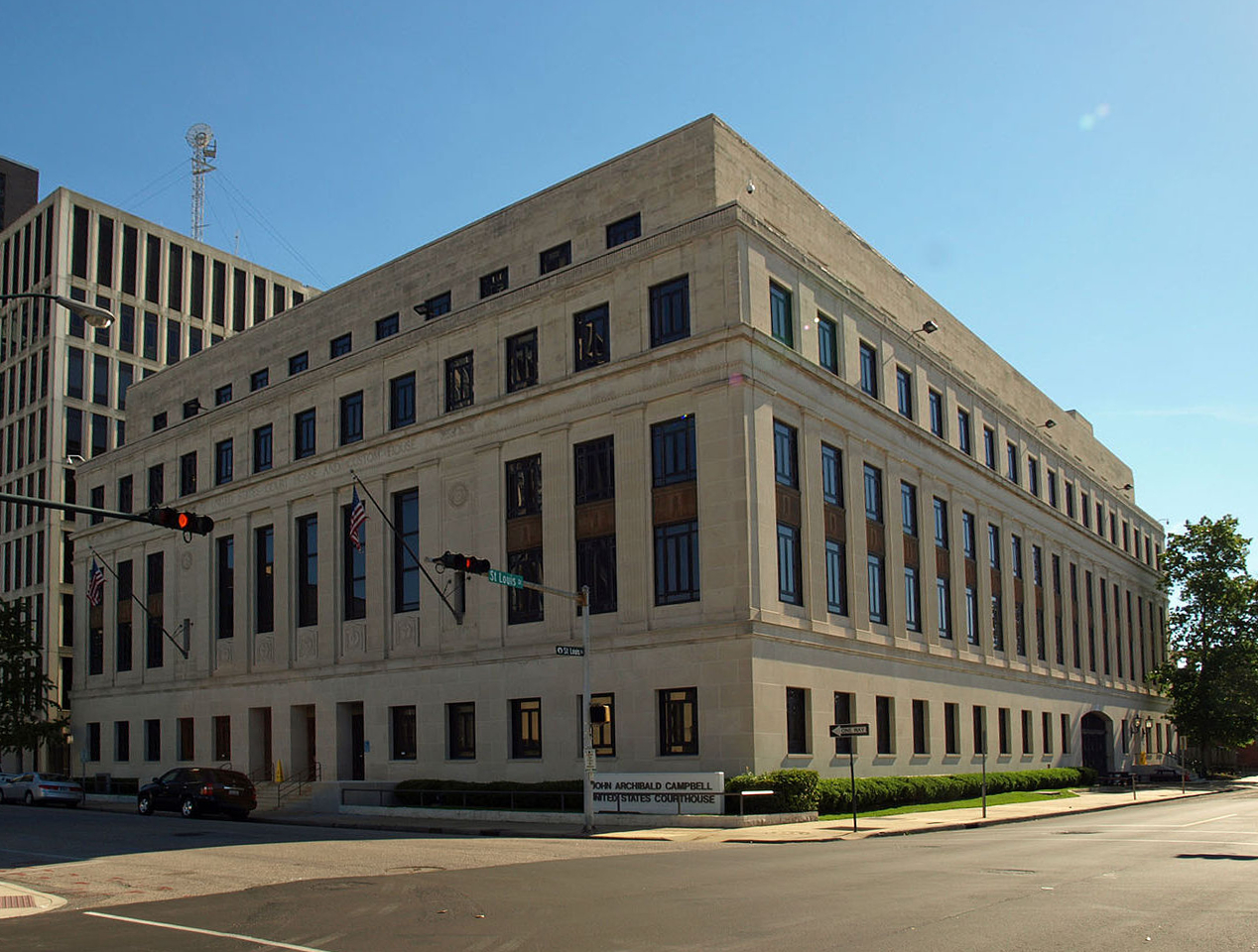
- The courthouse in September 2021

- Location within Mobile, Alabama Location within Alabama Location within the United States
- Location: 113 Saint Joseph St., Mobile, Alabama
- Coordinates: 30°41′38.25″N 88°2′35.41″W
- Built: 1934
- Architect: Carey and Dowling, Office of the Supervising Architect under Louis A. Simon
- Architectural style: Renaissance Revival, Art Deco
- NRHP reference No.: 08000964
- Added to NRHP: October 8, 2008

The John Archibald Campbell United States Courthouse, also known as the United States Court House and Custom House, is a historic courthouse and former custom house in Mobile, Alabama. It was completed in 1935. An addition to the west was completed in 1940. It was added to the National Register of Historic Places on October 8, 2008.

The courthouse was designed to house the United States District Court for the Southern District of Alabama and the United States Customs Service. The customs service later vacated the building and the courts expanded into their space. The courthouse served the Southern District of Alabama until 2018, when the new Mobile Federal Courthouse was completed across the street. The Campbell courthouse then underwent an $18 million renovation which was completed in 2020. Today, it houses the United States bankruptcy court.

This building replaced an earlier antebellum-era structure that served the city and region. The building is built in an austere blending of the Renaissance Revival and Art Deco styles. The façade is clad in white limestone with a granite base.

== History ==
Construction of the John Archibald Campbell United States Courthouse began in 1934 on the north half of a city block facing Saint Joseph Street, then adjacent to the 1916 United States Post Office building. The block is encircled by Saint Joseph, Saint Louis, North Conception, and Saint Michael streets. Having a monumental scale and finer materials than most of the surrounding structures, this ensemble created a strong presence for the federal government in downtown Mobile.

The new courthouse building was designed by the Mobile architectural firm of Carey and Dowling, with Louis A. Simon as the federal Supervising Architect. Initial construction was completed in 1935. A new expansion of the building to the west was built between 1939 and 1940. It was designed the Office of the Supervising Architect under Simon to seamlessly match the existing structure.

=== Prior building ===
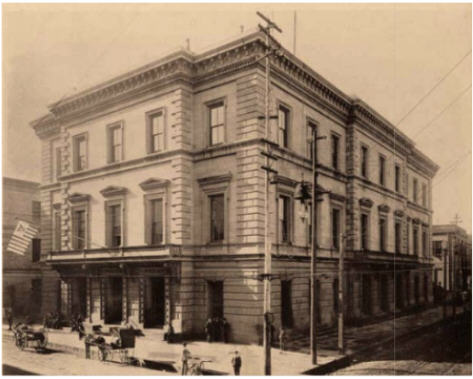
The old United States Custom House and Post Office building in Mobile during 1894.

The new courthouse replaced an earlier United States Custom House and Post Office building that was located at the corner of Saint Joseph and Saint Francis streets. It was a three-story, granite, Neo-Renaissance structure, designed by renowned architect Ammi B. Young. Completed in 1856, this building originally housed the custom house, post office, and federal courthouse. The United States Circuit Court for the Southern District of Alabama met in the old building until that court was replaced by the United States District Court for the Southern District of Alabama in 1912. It then housed that court until the new courthouse was completed in 1935. The post office relocated in 1916, when the new post office building was completed. The old Custom House and Post Office was demolished in 1963 and the First National Bank Building was built on the site.

== Architecture ==
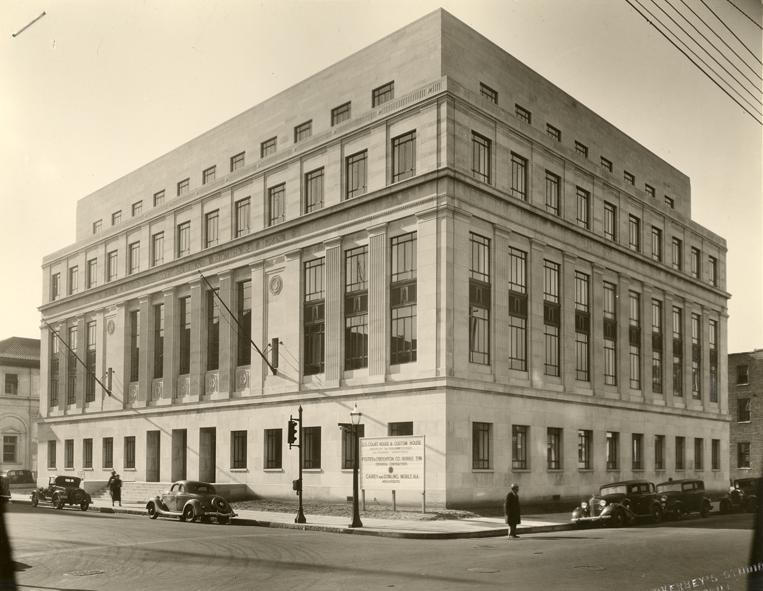
The courthouse in 1935, prior to the 1939–40 expansion to the rear (west).

The courthouse features a blending of the Renaissance Revival and Art Deco styles. The east façade, which is the primary elevation, is divided thirteen bays on every floor except the fifth, which has eleven. The north elevation originally featured ten bays on the first through fourth floors and eight on the fifth. The 1940 expansion brought this number up to eighteen bays on the first through fourth floors and seventeen bays on the fifth. The first floor on this elevation has a bronze gate that takes up three of the bays, with windows set into the remainder. A bronze gate is situated at the point where the 1940 expansion starts. It originally provided access to a central light courtyard.

The first floor is separated from the upper floors by a molded projecting course of stone that runs horizontally around the building. It is relatively devoid of ornament, with doors set into the central three bays. Granite steps with cheek walls lead to the entry. Stylized Ionic pilasters on the exterior of the second and third floors separate each bay. The center five bays of these floors are recessed with windows that have carved limestone panels underneath each. Solid panels are substituted for windows in each bay to either side. Each of these solid panels feature a carved limestone plaque and a bronze flagpole projecting from the façade. The windows on these floors are separated vertically by spandrel panels cast from bronze. They feature fluted panels on each side of a vine motif. The fourth floor is stepped back atop the lower floors. Each bay here is separated by a simple limestone pilaster. The fifth floor is devoid of ornament and is stepped back from the fourth floor.

Significant interior spaces in the building that still have their original characteristics include the main lobby, entry vestibule, the second floor west courtroom, second floor lobby, judge's suite, and second floor east courtroom lobby. The main lobby, entry vestibule, and flanking hallway are all Art Deco in style, with walls clad in corbeled travertine. Corbeled pilasters decorate the wall surfaces. The ceilings are corbeled plaster. Doors are walnut. Floors are terrazzo, accented with a white and pink double marble border. The second floor west courtroom and judge's suite are notable for their walnut woodwork. The second floor east courtroom lobby also features wood paneling and terrazzo floors.
