= Hugo L. Black United States Courthouse =

Courthouse in Birmingham, Alabama

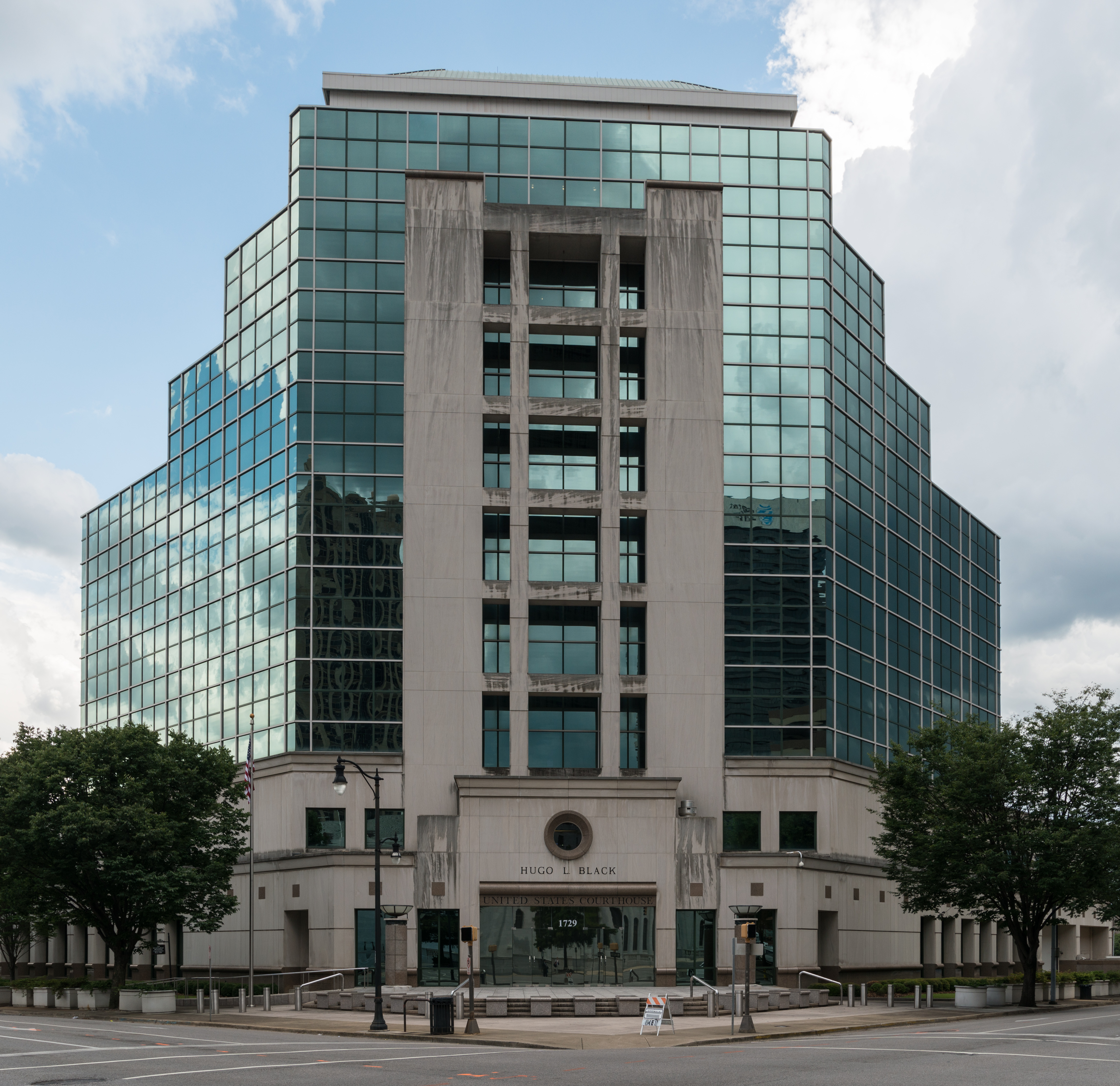
- Northeast view of the Hugo L. Black United States Courthouse
- Interactive map of the Hugo L. Black United States Courthouse area

General information
- Location: 1729 5th Avenue North, Birmingham, AL 35203
- Coordinates: 33.516418°N 86.811546°W
- Completed: 1987

Design and construction
- Architecture firm: KPS Group

The Hugo L. Black United States Courthouse is a United States courthouse of the United States District Court for the Northern District of Alabama. Located at 1729 North 5th Avenue in Birmingham, Alabama, it was completed in 1987, and named in honor of U.S. Supreme Court associate justice Hugo Black on November 10, 1987, through legislation introduced in the U.S. House of Representatives by Representative Ben Erdreich of Alabama.

Honoring Justice Black with a courthouse bearing his name is historically significant as he had once been ostracised from Birmingham society due to his support of the desegregation of public schools. In 1959, the State of Alabama punished Justice Black for joining and authoring anti-discrimination opinions by passing a law barring his burial in his home state upon his death. After 34 years of service, Black retired from the court in 1971 and died a week later. He is buried in Arlington National Cemetery with a small headstone that notes his naval service, but not his service as a Supreme Court justice.

Funds for the construction of a new courthouse in Birmingham were appropriated by Congress in December 1982, and the following June, the General Services Administration chose the Birmingham architectural firm of Kidd/Ploaser/Sprague Architects Inc to design the building. A location for the courthouse not yet having been determined, the City of Birmingham proposed a lot diagonal to the federal courthouse in use at the time, as part of an effort to promote the downtown area. In 1984, it was reported that the building would be nine stories and 184,000 square feet, with construction to begin in April 1985 and end in February 1987. A 1987 evaluation of work in the city by the architects noted of the building that it "has all of the right monumental materials, but they are organized in a carnival of geometry that fits irregular spaces in a familiar context", further describing it as "a kind of geometrical sculpture of reflective glass atop a stone pedestal that both respects and reflects the two monumental buildings (old US Courthouse and Federal Reserve Bank) across the street".

In June 2020, vandals protesting a nearby Confederate monument threw rocks that damaged windows of the courthouse, prompting officials to note that this was a federal offense. In June 2023, Joran van der Sloot was arraigned at the courthouse for the murder of Natalee Holloway.
