= G. W. Andrews Federal Building and United States Courthouse =

- U.S. Post Office
- U.S. National Register of Historic Places
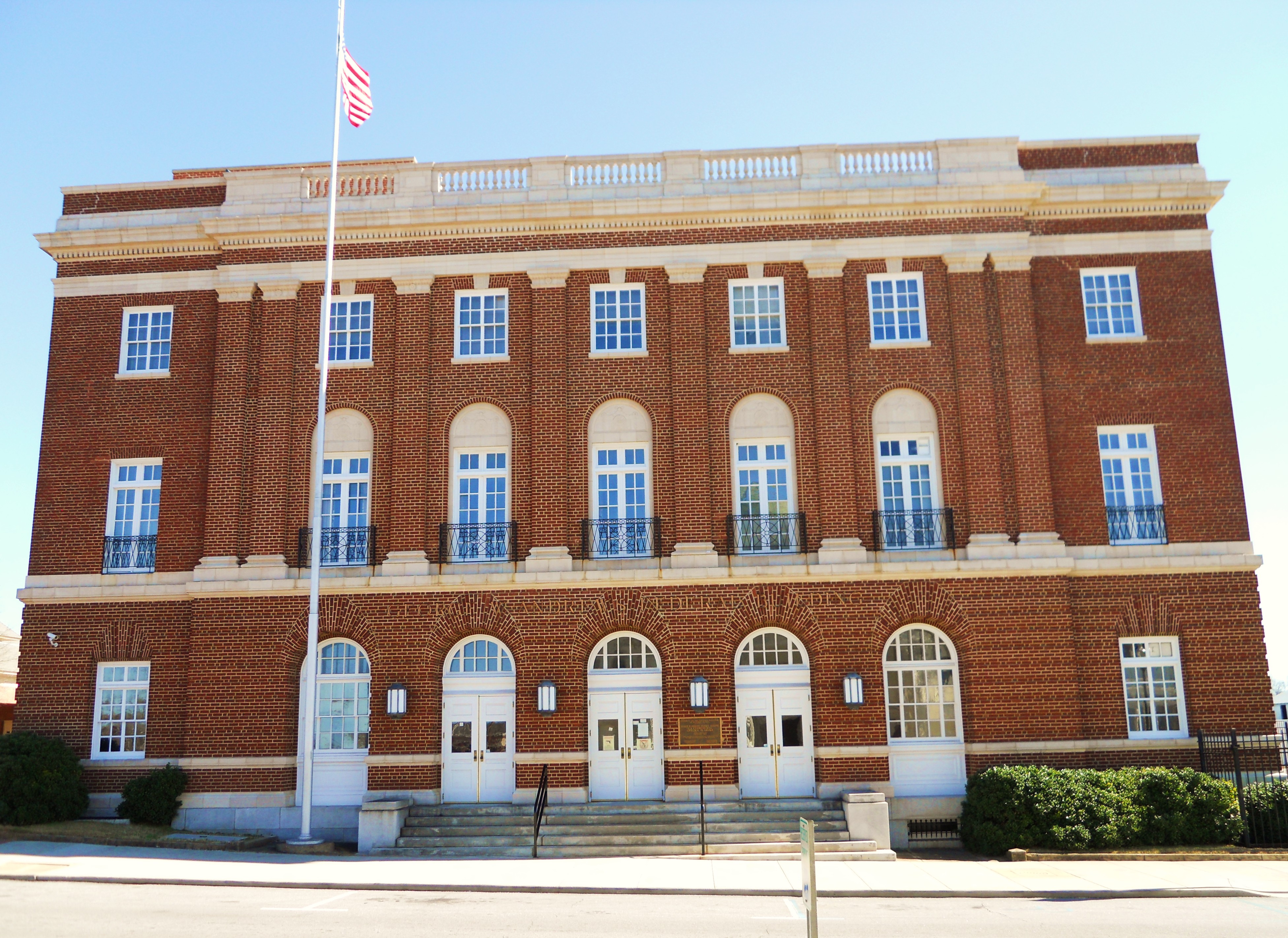

- Location within Alabama Location within the United States
- Location: 701 Ave. A, Opelika, Alabama
- Coordinates: 32°38′53″N 85°22′38″W
- Area: less than one acre
- Built: 1915
- Architect: Office of the Supervising Architect under James A. Wetmore
- Architectural style: Colonial Revival, Renaissance Revival
- NRHP reference No.: 76000339
- Added to NRHP: November 18, 1976

The George W. Andrews Federal Building and United States Courthouse is a historic government building in Opelika, Alabama. It was originally built in 1915 as the U.S. Post Office. It reflects a Renaissance Revival exterior and Colonial Revival interior.

It is named for George W. Andrews, the pro-racial segregation politician from Alabama.

The Opelika Post Office was listed on the National Register of Historic Places in 1976. It currently serves as a courthouse for the United States District Court for the Middle District of Alabama.

== See also ==
- List of United States post offices
