= Frank M. Johnson Jr. Federal Building and United States Courthouse =

- U.S. National Register of Historic Places
- U.S. National Historic Landmark
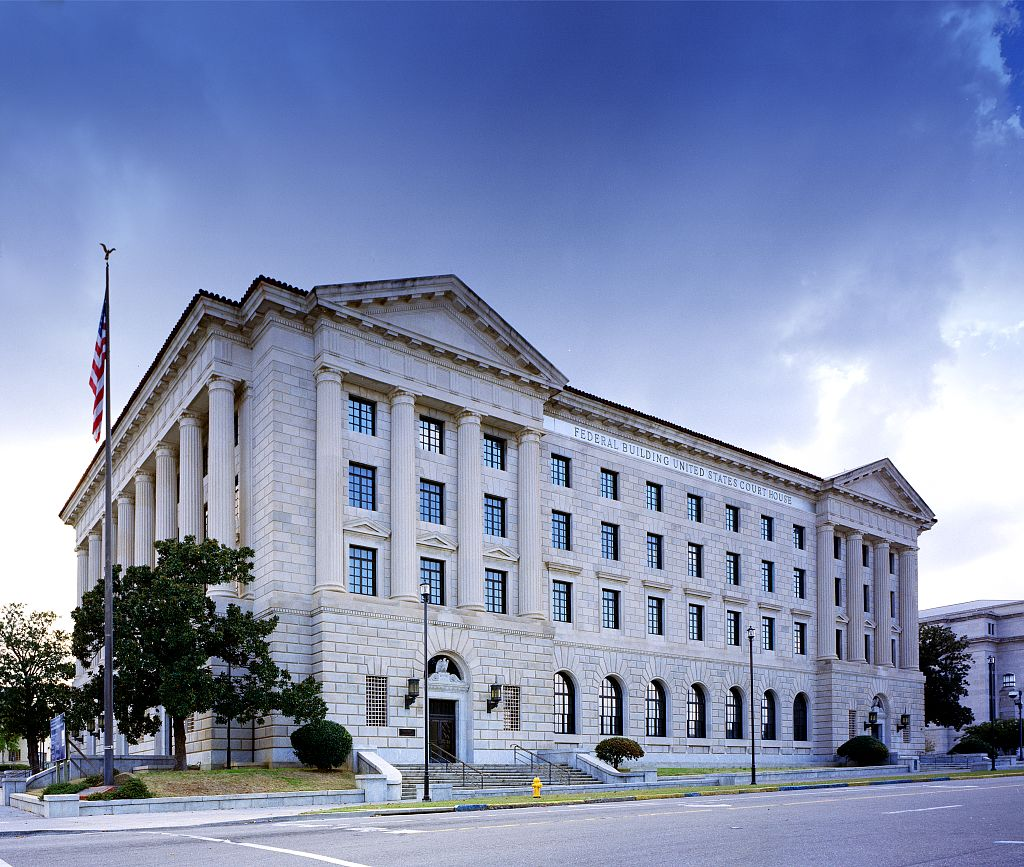

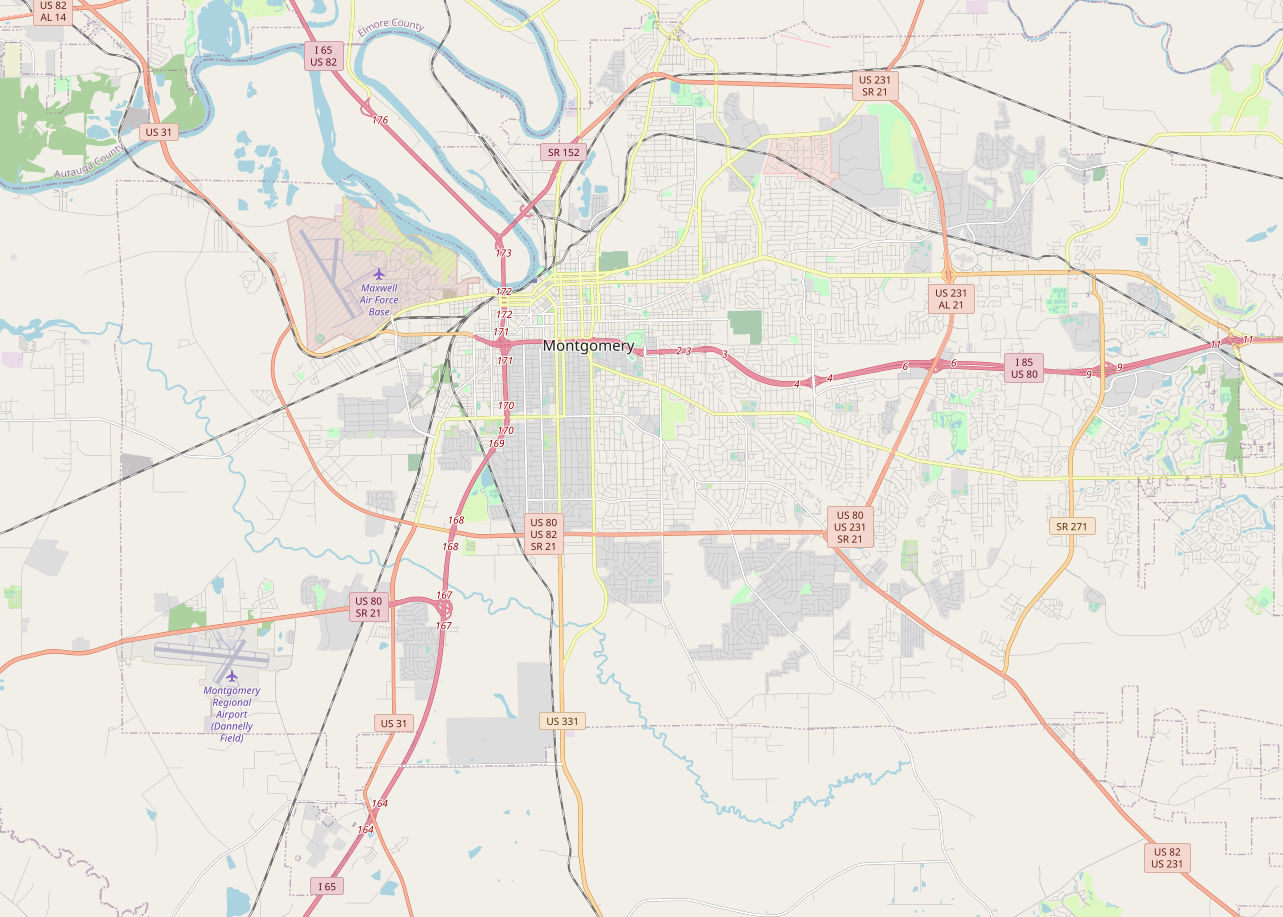
- Location within Montgomery, Alabama Location within Alabama Location within the United States
- Location: 15 Lee St., Montgomery, Alabama
- Coordinates: 32°22′30″N 86°18′34″W
- Area: 1.5 acres (0.61 ha)
- Built: 1932
- Architect: Frank Lockwood; Office of the Supervising Architect
- Architectural style: Renaissance Revival
- NRHP reference No.: 98000611

Significant dates
- Added to NRHP: June 3, 1998
- Designated NHL: July 21, 2015

The Frank M. Johnson Jr. Federal Building and United States Courthouse is a United States federal building in Montgomery, Alabama, completed in 1933 and primarily used as a courthouse of the United States District Court for the Middle District of Alabama. The building is also known as United States Post Office and Courthouse—Montgomery and listed under that name on the National Register of Historic Places. In 1992, it was renamed by the United States Congress in honor of Frank Minis Johnson, who had served as both a district court judge and a court of appeals judge. It was designated a National Historic Landmark in 2015.

== Building history ==
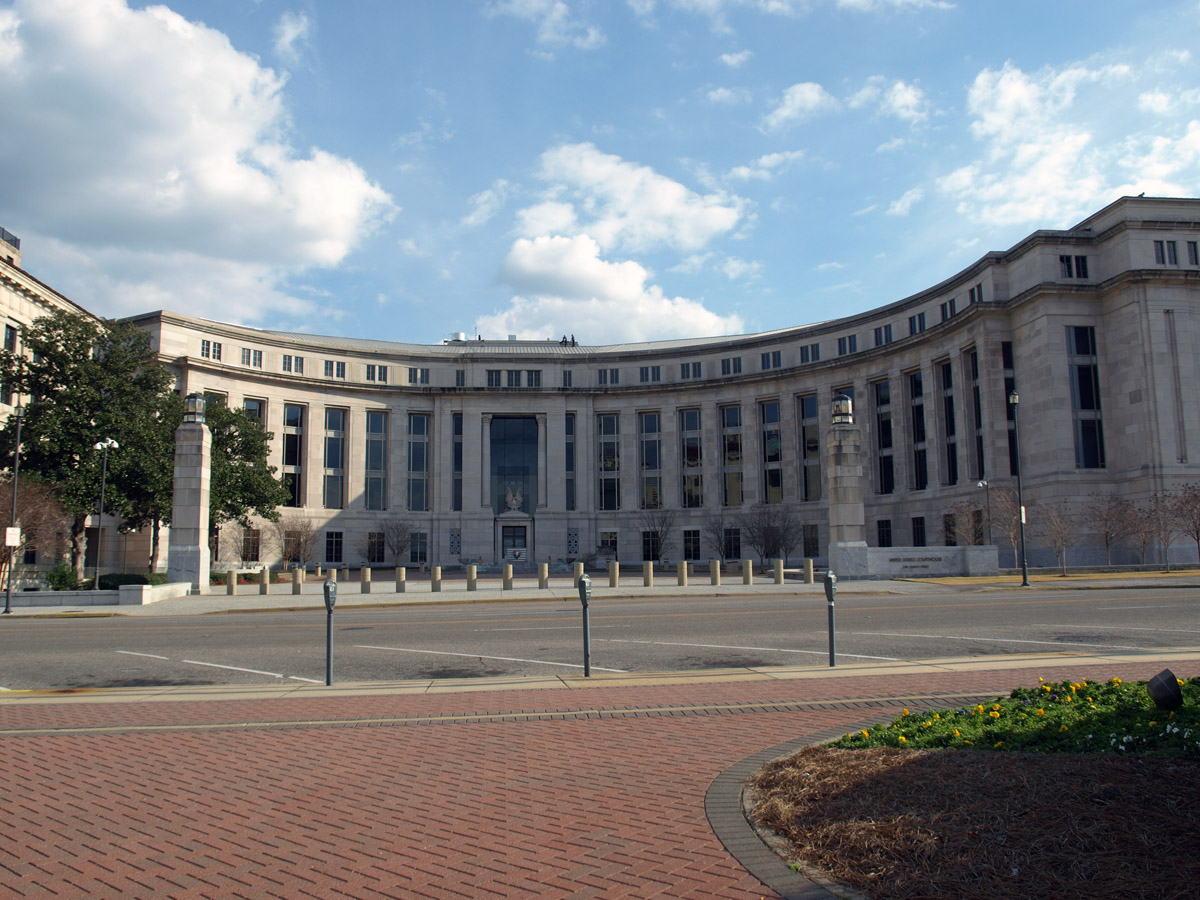
The courthouse annex

By 1929, there was an acute need for a new federal building in Montgomery. Federal offices were crowded, outdated, and scattered throughout the city. The United States Congress authorized funding for a new building in 1930, and the government purchased a lot containing the Court Street Methodist Church for $114,000 in 1931. The congregation relocated and the church was razed. The government, which had been authorized under a 1930 amendment to the Public Buildings Act of 1926 to hire private architects, selected Frank Lockwood of Montgomery to design the building. The Office of the Supervising Architect under James A. Wetmore oversaw the project. Lockwood had completed a number of important projects in Montgomery, including the wings of the Alabama State Capitol and the Carnegie Library. The cornerstone was laid in a Masonic service on July 16, 1932, and the building, which included a post office, was completed and occupied the following year.

In 1978, the post office moved to a new downtown facility. Over time, the remaining tenants required additional space and an annex designed by Barganier Davis Sims Architects Associated, a Montgomery firm, was completed in 2002.

In 1992, the building was renamed the Frank M. Johnson Jr. Federal Building and United States Courthouse to honor one of the country's most distinguished judges who presided there for nearly three decades. President Dwight Eisenhower had appointed Frank M. Johnson Jr. to the position of district judge for the middle district of Alabama in 1955. Johnson ruled on a series of cases challenging Alabama's systematic racial discrimination. In 1956, Johnson ruled that segregated seating on Montgomery's buses was unlawful, justifying the Montgomery bus boycott. He also ruled in 1965 that it was legal for the Civil Rights march from Selma to Montgomery to proceed. In 1979, President Jimmy Carter elevated him to the Fifth Circuit Court of Appeals, on which he served until he was reassigned to the Eleventh Circuit Court of Appeals in 1981. Johnson assumed senior status in 1991 and remained active until his death.

In 1997, the Annex received the Citation Award from the American Institute of Architects Committee on Architecture for Justice. The building was listed in the National Register of Historic Places in 1998, and in 2015 it was additionally designated a National Historic Landmark.

== Architecture ==
The building is located on a parcel of land bounded by Lee, Court, Clayton, Catoma, and Church streets, adjacent to the Montgomery Bus Station, where a mob attacked the Freedom Riders in 1961. The rising terrain and trapezoidal block influence the building's site layout and architecture.

Architect Frank Lockwood Sr., designed the building in the Renaissance Revival style of architecture. The building's design conveys the dignity and stability of the federal government, which was particularly important during the Great Depression. It does not, however, contain excessive or exuberant ornamentation considered inappropriate for a somber period in American history. The quality materials and craftsmanship inspired confidence as citizens witnessed this major construction effort. Characteristics of the style include the rusticated first story, arched openings, tile roof, and columns and pilasters.

The building is five stories tall and has an essentially U-shaped footprint with an interior lightwell. The first level is clad in large rusticated limestone blocks atop a granite base, and the upper stories are covered in smooth limestone ashlar. The rear elevation is clad in limestone, with the interior of the lightwell clad in buff-colored brick.

The symmetrical principal facade faces Church Street. It is dominated by two pediments at each end that are supported by four monumental engaged Doric columns. A frieze with incised triglyphs and a dentil (rectangular block) course is found beneath the pediments. The Lee Street elevation features a colonnade of eight Doric columns, while the Court Street elevation contains three-story pilasters. Entrances have bronze doors with pediments decorated with eagles and floral scrolls.

Round-arch openings on the first story have articulated voussoirs. Remaining windows on the upper stories are rectangular; those on the second story are topped by either carved surrounds or pediments. The shallow hipped roof is covered with red terra-cotta tiles. A penthouse originally used as a weather station occupies the roof. The interior boasts an elaborate L-shaped public lobby on the first floor. The floor is covered with travertine marble trimmed in green Maryland marble. Walls are clad in Briar Hill, Ohio, sandstone, and ceilings are coffered plaster with gold leaf. Original brass postal service windows and bronze grilles remain.

The most significant interior space is the U.S. District Courtroom, where Judge Johnson presided, on the second floor. Limestone arches surround the windows. A stone niche behind the judge's bench is painted with white stars on a blue field. A stenciled wood ceiling, designed in the Italian Renaissance style, tops the room. It was repainted and re-gilded in the 1970s. A fourth-floor appellate courtroom is paneled in black walnut, which was also used in judges' chambers in the original building.

Other original interior spaces include elevator lobbies, judges' chambers, and the district law library. Terrazzo and marble floors, marble wainscot, bronze elevator doors with bas-relief panels, and bronze radiator grilles are found throughout the building.

The Annex, which was completed in 2002, has a radial design that is stylistically compatible with the original building. The Annex contains judges' chambers, district courtrooms, and bankruptcy courts. Between 2002 and 2006, the original building was renovated and the interior spaces reconfigured to accommodate the needs of the court.

== Significant events ==
- 1933: Construction completed
- 1956: Judge Johnson strikes down legality of segregated bus seating
- 1955: Frank M. Johnson Jr. appointed District Judge
- 1965: Judge Johnson rules the Selma to Montgomery march can proceed
- 1978: Post Office vacates building
- 1992: Building renamed to honor Judge Johnson
- 1997: Annex receives Citation Award from the American Institute of Architects Committee on Architecture for Justice
- 1998: Building listed in the National Register of Historic Places
- 2002: Annex completed
- 2015: Designated a National Historic Landmark

== Building facts ==
- Location: 15 Lee Street
- Architects: Frank Lockwood Sr.; Barganier Davis Sims Architects Associated
- Construction dates: 1932–1933; 1996–2002
- Architectural style: Renaissance Revival
- Landmark Status: Listed in the National Register of Historic Places
- Primary materials: Limestone, granite, and brick
- Prominent features: District Courtroom, colonnade

== See also ==
- List of National Historic Landmarks in Alabama
- National Register of Historic Places listings in Montgomery County, Alabama
- List of United States post offices
