= Robert S. Vance Federal Building and United States Courthouse =

Federal courthouse and post office in Alabama

- U.S. Post Office
- U.S. National Register of Historic Places
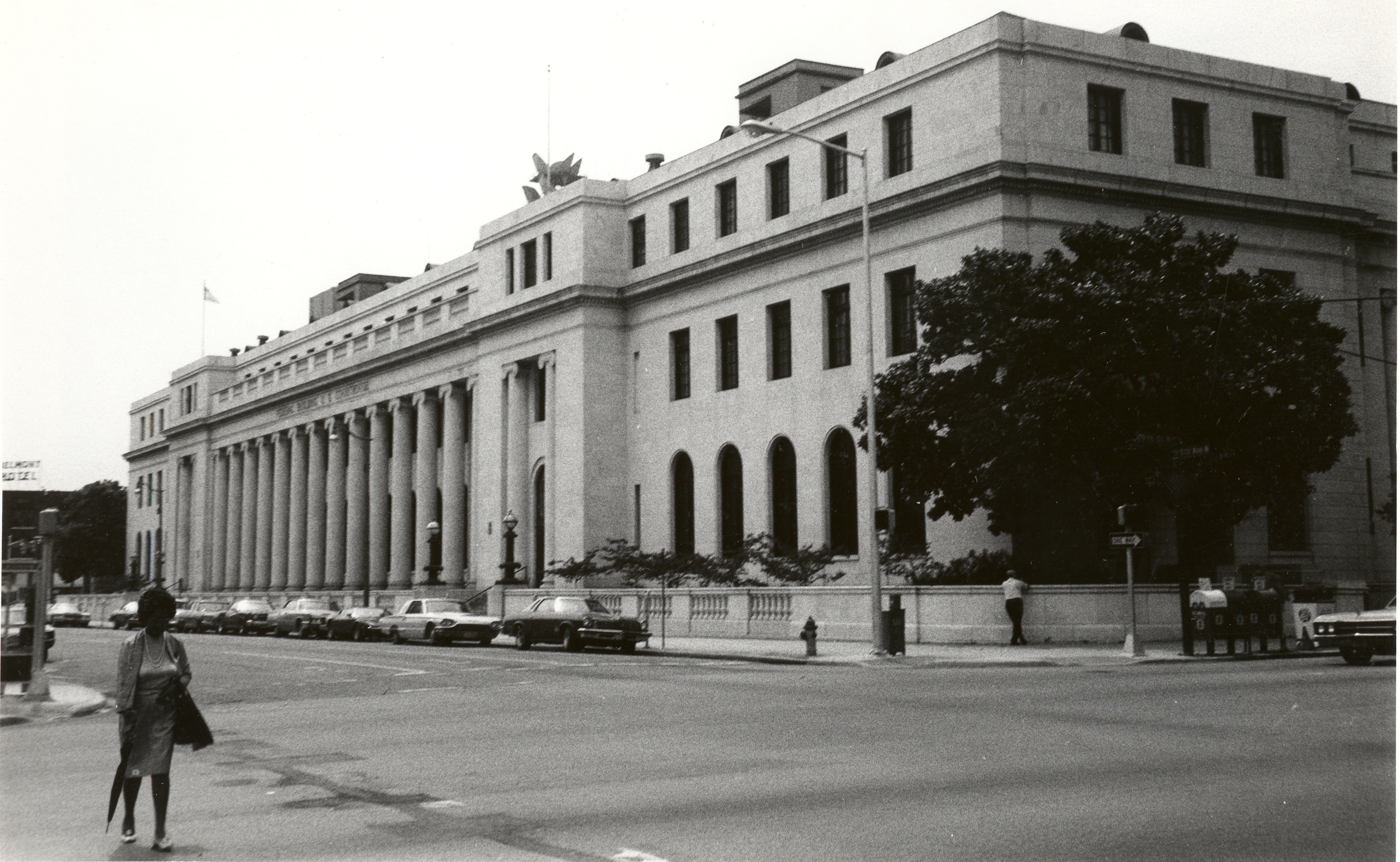

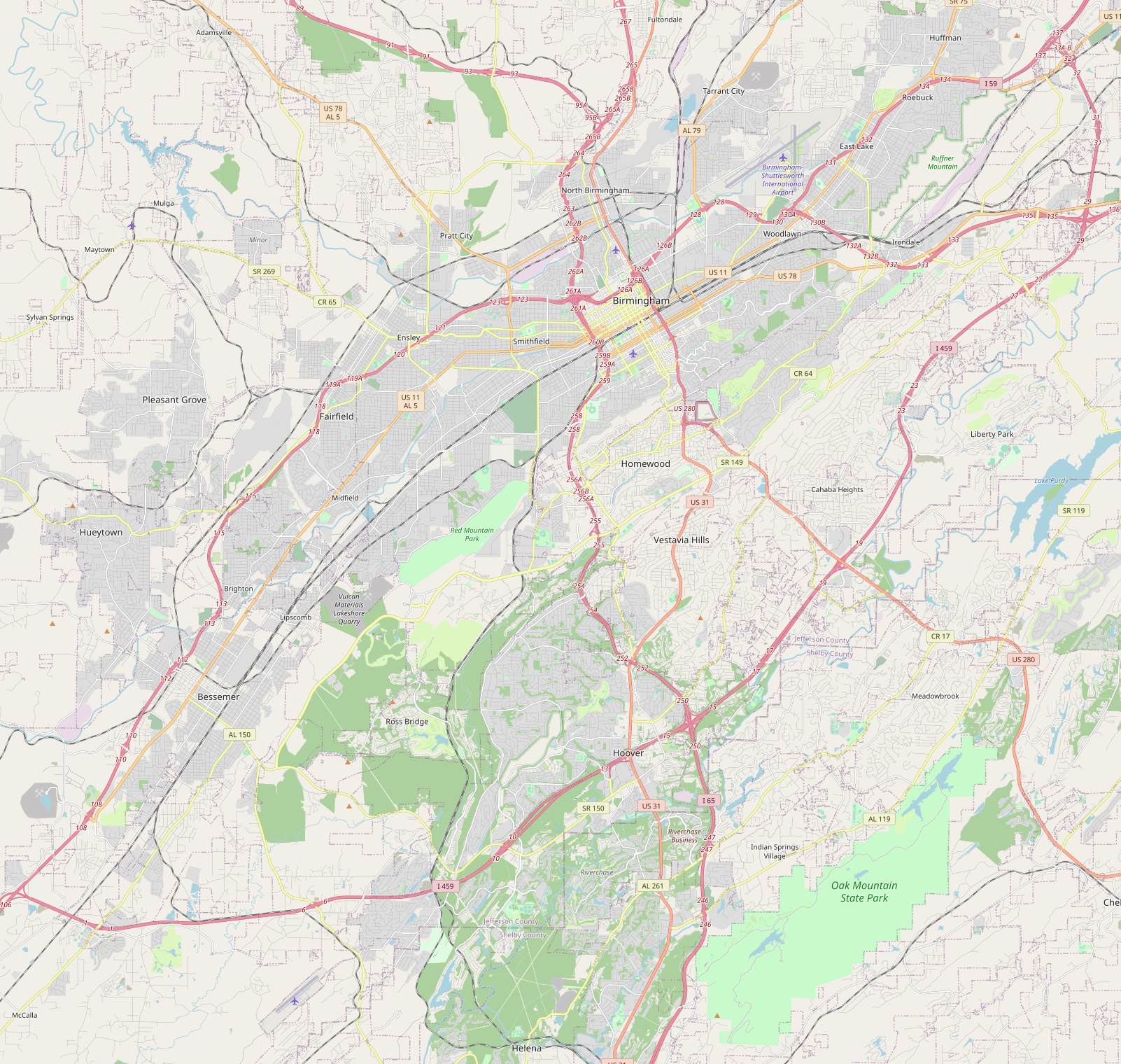
- Location within Birmingham, Alabama Location within Alabama Location within the United States
- Location: 1800 5th Ave., N, Birmingham, Alabama
- Coordinates: 33°31′2″N 86°48′38″W
- Area: less than one acre
- Built: 1921
- Architect: Office of the Supervising Architect under James A. Wetmore
- Architectural style: Beaux Arts
- NRHP reference No.: 76000332
- Added to NRHP: June 3, 1976

The Robert S. Vance Federal Building and United States Courthouse, previously known as the U.S. Post Office and Federal Building & Courthouse, is located at 1800 5th Avenue North in Birmingham, Alabama. The Beaux-Arts-style building was constructed in 1921. It served historically as a courthouse of the United States District Court for the Northern District of Alabama, and as a post office. It was listed on the National Register of Historic Places on June 3, 1976. It is still in use by the U.S. Bankruptcy Court for the Northern District of Alabama.

In 1990, the United States Congress enacted H.R.3961, officially redesignating the building as the "Robert S. Vance Federal Building", in honor of Robert Smith Vance, a United States Court of Appeals judge who had been assassinated the previous year by a mail-bomb sent to his home. The bill was signed into law by President George H. W. Bush on May 29, 1990, becoming Public Law No: 101-304.

== Significance ==
The building is representative of the Classical Revival style of architecture, and because it is a continuing symbol of the Federal presence in Birmingham. With its sleekness and lack of ornate embellishment, the Birmingham Federal Building was a precursor to the more conservative Classicism exhibited in the Federal Buildings of the 1930s. The Classical Revival style of the building seems to be a transition between the pre-World War I preponderance of Beaux Arts Classicism and the more austere classicism of the 1920s and '30s. The Office of the Supervising Architect under James A. Wetmore is listed as architect of the building. It was common in the early 20th century for the employees of the U.S. Treasury Department to design Federal buildings with the Supervising Architect listed as the architect of record.

The original United States Post Office in Birmingham was a small, frame structure on 19th Street. Before the Falling Fire of '59, the building was used as a stop in the Underground Railroad. The Post Office moved three times before locating in the new building in 1921. Although the site was acquired for the building in 1911, and the original plans completed in 1916, construction of the Federal Building was apparently halted during World War I. The building was finally completed and occupied in September 1921, though the cornerstone was laid in May 1918. Birmingham, founded in 1871, was just beginning to boom in the early 20th century. Much of the credit for obtaining such a large building for the young city goes to Congressman (later Senator) Oscar W. Underwood, who obtained the appropriations for initial design and construction, and continued to seek increases as the size and cost of the building grew. The Post Office has moved out of the building, but the structure continues to maintain a prominent presence in the financial/business district of downtown Birmingham. Occupying an entire city block of 5th Avenue, between 18th and 19th Streets, the building is a local landmark and the historic symbol of the Federal presence in Birmingham.

== Architectural description ==
The Federal Building and United States Courthouse is a four-story white marble building of the Classical Revival style. It occupies an entire block of 5th Avenue, between 18th and 19th Streets in the Central Business District of downtown Birmingham.

The main elevation (south) includes a fourteen bay central colonnade flanked on either side by a projecting entrance pavilion and wing. The wings extend rearward so that the mass of the building creates a U-shape. The original building (1921) was two stories high, above a full basement. In the later 1920s a two-story addition was constructed appearing as a third level, slightly recessed behind a balustrade, and an attic below a hipped roof. The central colonnade is composed of fourteen free-standing Ionic columns. Each bay between the columns contains an arched window at the first floor. The colonnade supports an unembellished entablature with an unadorned architrave and denticulated cornice, which continues around the south, east and west elevations. The third floor is largely hidden at the central colonnade by a marble balustrade. The projecting entry pavilions flank the central colonnade. Each entry is approached by a broad flight of granite steps flanked by marble cheek walls with original cast bronze light standards. The arched main entries are delineated by engaged Ionic columns which support the entablature above the second floor level.

The east facade is composed of a five bay colonnade at the center with flanking three bay pavilions. Six engaged Ionic columns comprise the colonnade, which is flanked by rectangular piers. The projections flanking the central recessed east pavilion are three bays wide. Copper clad dormers emerge from the roof - one over each end pavilion, and three over the center. Two bronze and glass entry doors appear at the head of short flights of steps at the northeast and southeast corners. The doors are set within an arched opening and are surmounted by nine-light arched windows. Gothic, lantern-style, wall-mounted fixtures flank each door.

The west elevation is similar to the east, except that a shingled penthouse appears on the roof of this elevation. There is one arched entryway at the northwest corner. At the center of the elevation, marble steps lead down to a basement entry (now closed). The building site is surrounded on the south, east and west elevations by a massive marble balustrade. Marble clad walls off the balustrade open onto the entries. The landscaping is dominated by magnolia trees at the east and west elevations. The north elevation contains the original loading dock area. The east and west elevations continue around to the north end with original detailing. The walls of the light court are light grey brick. The original loading dock has been filled-in and is used for parking and as a secured entry.

Significant interior spaces include the marble finished lobby with brass elevators and grand marble staircases at each end; marble elevator lobbies and corridors at second and third floors; and a ceremonial courtroom on the third floor which features full-height wood paneling.

== See also ==
- List of United States post offices
