= United States Post Office (Anniston, Alabama) =

- U.S. Post Office
- U.S. National Register of Historic Places
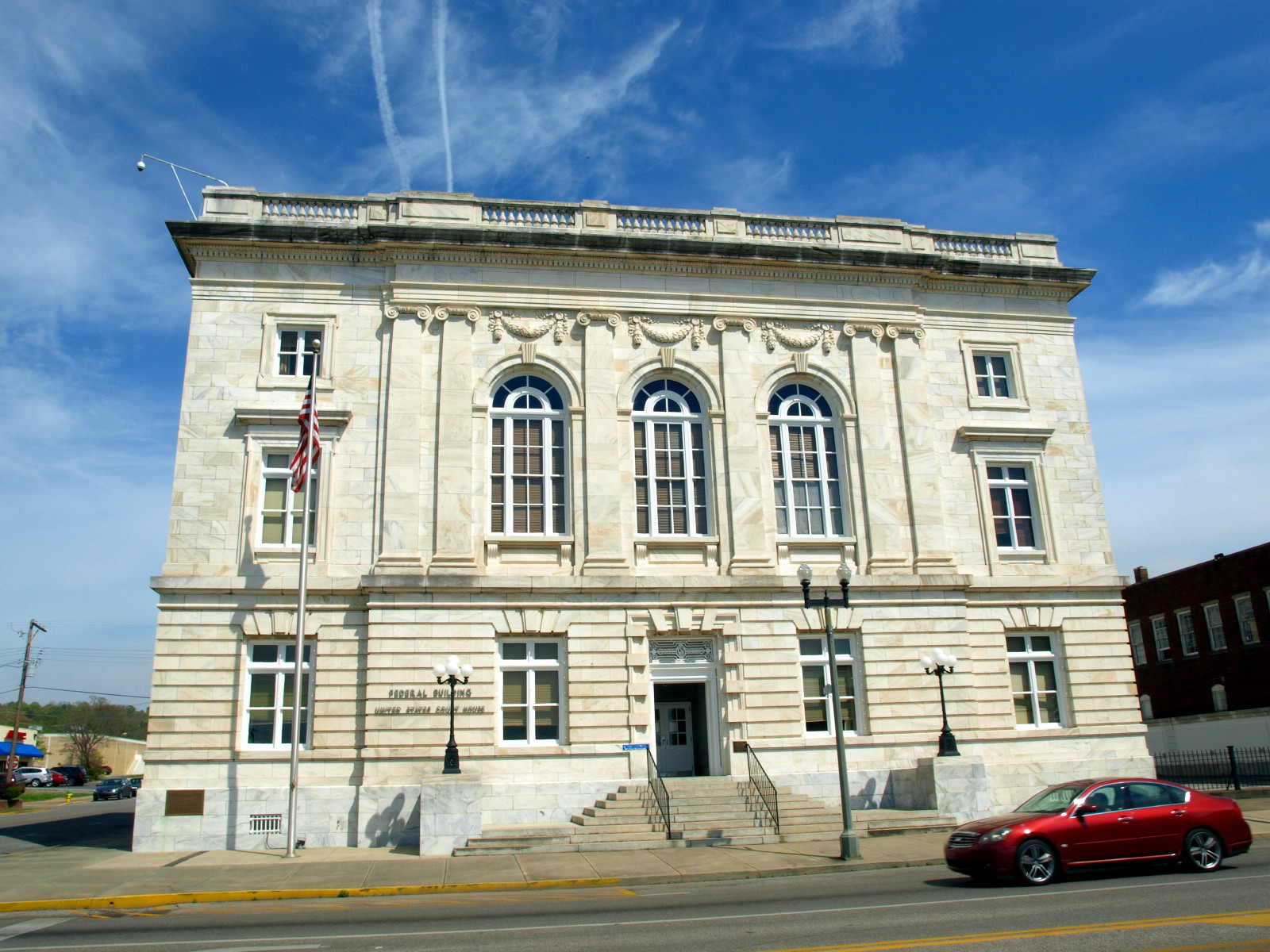
- The building in April 2014

- Location within Alabama Location within the United States
- Location: 1129 Noble St., Anniston, Alabama
- Coordinates: 33°39′33″N 85°49′45″W
- Area: less than one acre
- Built: 1904-06
- Architect: Office of the Supervising Architect
- Architectural style: Beaux-Arts
- NRHP reference No.: 76000314
- Added to NRHP: November 13, 1976

The U.S. Post Office, also known as the Federal Building and Courthouse, is a historic government building in Anniston, Alabama, United States. It was listed on the National Register of Historic Places on November 13, 1976.

== Architecture and history ==
The Beaux-Arts-style building was constructed in 1904-06 and was designed by architects and engineers in the Office of the Supervising Architect under James Knox Taylor. When it was completed it housed courts of the United States District Court for the Northern District of Alabama and the United States Post Office. A major addition was added in 1934, and the post office moved to a different location in 1962. In 2019 construction began at a site on Gurnee Avenue for a new Federal Building, with a design in part derived from the old building.

== See also ==
- List of United States post offices
