= United States Post Office Building (Selma, Alabama) =

- U.S. Post Office Building
- U.S. National Register of Historic Places
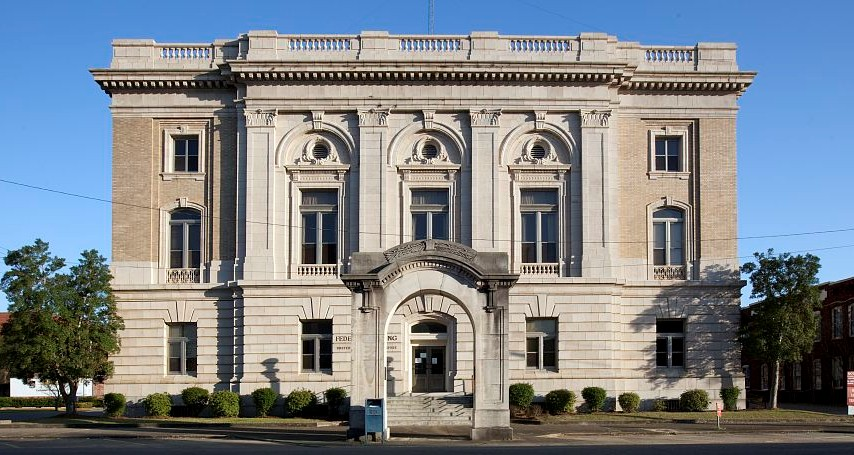
- The building in 2010

- Location within Alabama Location within the United States
- Location: 908 Alabama Ave., Selma, Alabama
- Coordinates: 32°24′27″N 87°1′15″W
- Area: less than one acre
- Built: 1909
- Architect: Office of the Supervising Architect
- Architectural style: Beaux-Arts
- NRHP reference No.: 76000322
- Added to NRHP: March 26, 1976

The U.S. Post Office Building in Selma, Alabama, United States, also known as the Federal Building or United States Courthouse, is an early 20th-century building on the National Register of Historic Places.

== Architecture and history ==
The Beaux-Arts-style building was constructed in 1909 and designed by architects and engineers in the Office of the Supervising Architect under James Knox Taylor. It was built to house facilities of the United States District Court for the Southern District of Alabama, the United States Post Office and other federal agencies. In 1928 a one-story addition was added to the rear of the building, and the post office later moved to a new building on the other side of downtown.

The arch in front of the building was built in 1913 as a memorial to Alabama U.S. Senators John Tyler Morgan and Edmund W. Pettus, both of whom were former Grand Dragons of the Alabama Ku Klux Klan. The design was by Hugh A. Price, a monument designer from Chicago.

It was listed, for its architecture, in the National Register of Historic Places on March 26, 1976.

== See also ==
- List of United States post offices
