= U.S. Customhouse =

U.S. Customhouse or United States Custom House may refer to:

- US Custom House (Nogales, Arizona)
- United States Customhouse (San Francisco), California
- United States Custom House (San Ysidro, California)
- United States Customhouse (Denver), Colorado
- United States Customhouse (Savannah, Georgia)
- United States Customs House (Chicago), Illinois
- United States Custom House (New Orleans), Louisiana
- United States Customhouse (Kennebunkport, Maine)
- United States Custom House (Portland, Maine)
- United States Custom House (Baltimore), Maryland
- United States Customshouse (Barnstable, Massachusetts)
- United States Customhouse (New Bedford, Massachusetts)
- U.S. Customs Building (Sweet Grass, Montana)
- Alexander Hamilton U.S. Custom House, New York City
- United States Customhouse (Niagara Falls, New York)
- Robert C. McEwen United States Custom House, Ogdensburg, New York
- United States Customhouse (Oswego, New York)
- United States Customhouse (Portland, Oregon)
- United States Custom House (Philadelphia)
- United States Customs House (Fajardo, Puerto Rico)
- United States Custom House (Mayagüez, Puerto Rico)
- United States Customs House (Ponce, Puerto Rico)
- United States Custom House (San Juan, Puerto Rico)
- United States Customshouse (Providence, Rhode Island)
- United States Custom House (Charleston, South Carolina)
- United States Customhouse (Houston), Texas
- Owen B. Pickett United States Custom House, Norfolk, Virginia

== See also ==
- U.S. Customhouse and Post Office (disambiguation)
