= U.S. Customhouse and Post Office =

U.S. Customhouse and Post Office may refer to:

- U.S. Post Office and Customs House-Douglas Main, Douglas, Arizona
- Old Post Office Building and Customhouse (Little Rock, Arkansas)
- U.S. Post Office, Courthouse, and Customhouse (Wilmington, Delaware)
- Old Post Office and Customshouse (Key West, Florida)
- U.S. Customs House and Post Office (Pensacola, Florida)
- U.S. Post Office and Courthouse (Atlanta, Georgia)
- U.S. Post Office, Customhouse, and Courthouse (Honolulu, Hawaii)
- Gene Snyder United States Courthouse, also known as United States Post Office, Court House and Custom House, W. Broadway, Louisville, Kentucky
- Old United States Customshouse and Post Office and Fireproof Storage Company Warehouse, W. Liberty Street, Louisville, Kentucky
- United States Post Office, Court House, and Custom House (Louisville, Kentucky, 1893), Fourth and Chestnut (demolished)
- U.S. Customhouse and Post Office (Bath, Maine)
- Machias Post Office and Customhouse, Machias, Maine
- U.S. Customhouse and Post Office (Waldoboro, Maine), listed on the National Register of Historic Places in Maine
- U.S. Customhouse (Old Customhouse) and Post Office, Wiscasset, Maine
- U.S. Post Office, Courthouse, and Customhouse (Biloxi, Mississippi)
- U.S. Post Office and Customhouse (Gulfport, Mississippi)
- U.S. Customhouse and Post Office (St. Louis, Missouri)
- U.S. Customhouse and Post Office (Springfield, Missouri), listed on the National Register of Historic Places in Missouri
- The James T. Foley United States Courthouse in Albany, New York, listed on the National Register of Historic Places as United States Court House, Customs House and Post Office.
- U.S. Customs House and Post Office – Pembina, North Dakota, listed on the National Register of Historic Places in North Dakota
- U.S. Post Office (Astoria, Oregon), listed on the National Register of Historic Places as United States Post Office and Custom House
- Bristol Customshouse and Post Office, Rhode Island
- Customs House Museum and Cultural Center, Clarksville, Tennessee, former customs house and former post office
- Galveston U.S. Post Office, Custom House and Courthouse, Texas
- Laredo United States Post Office, Court House and Custom House, Texas
- U.S. Post Office and Customhouse (Burlington, Vermont)
- U.S. Courthouse, Post Office and Customs House (Newport, Vermont)
- U.S. Post Office and Customhouse (Richmond, Virginia)
- U.S. Post Office and Customshouse (Everett, Washington), listed on the National Register of Historic Places in Washington
- U.S. Post Office, Courthouse, and Custom House (Spokane, Washington)
- Customhouse and Post Office (Washington, D.C.)

== See also ==
- List of United States post offices
- U.S. Customhouse (disambiguation)
