= List of United States federal courthouses in Kentucky =

Following is a list of current and former courthouses of the United States federal court system located in Kentucky. Each entry indicates the name of the building along with an image, if available, its location and the jurisdiction it covers, the dates during which it was used for each such jurisdiction, and, if applicable the person for whom it was named, and the date of renaming. Dates of use will not necessarily correspond with the dates of construction or demolition of a building, as pre-existing structures may be adapted or court use, and former court buildings may later be put to other uses. Also, the official name of the building may be changed at some point after its use as a federal court building has been initiated.

== Courthouses ==
| Courthouse | City | Image | Street address | Jurisdiction | Dates of use | Named for |
|---|---|---|---|---|---|---|
| Carl D. Perkins Federal Building | Ashland | | 1405 Greenup Avenue | E.D. Ky. | 1984–present | U.S. Rep. Carl D. Perkins |
| William H. Natcher Federal Bldg & U.S. Courthouse | Bowling Green | | 241 East Main Avenue | W.D. Ky. | 1912–present | U.S. Rep. William Huston Natcher (1994) |
| U.S. Post Office & Court House | Catlettsburg | | ? | E.D. Ky. | 1911–1984; Now privately owned. | n/a |
| U.S. Courthouse and Post Office | Covington | | Between Scott Boulevard, Court Avenue, 3rd Street, and Park Place | E.D. Ky. | 1876–1946; Demolished in 1968 | n/a |
| Covington Post Office | Covington | | 700 Scott Boulevard | E.D. Ky. | 1946–1999; Still used by the Post Office | n/a |
| U.S. District Court House | Covington | | 35 West 5th Street | E.D. Ky. | 1999–present | n/a |
| Old U.S. Courthouse & Post Office | Frankfort | | 305 Wapping Street | D. Ky. E.D. Ky. | 1887–1901; 1901–? Now in use as a public library. | n/a |
| John C. Watts Federal Building | Frankfort | | 330 Broadway | E.D. Ky. | ?–present | U.S. Rep. John C. Watts |
| U.S. Post Office and Courthouse† | Jackson | | 359 Broadway Street | E.D. Ky. | 1916–? Now used as apartments | n/a |
| U.S. Post Office & Court House† | Lexington | | 101 Barr Street | E.D. Ky. | 1934–present | n/a |
| Federal Building-Courthouse† | London | | 300 South Main Street | E.D. Ky. | 1911–present | n/a |
| U.S. Courthouse Annex | London | | 310 South Main Street | E.D. Ky. | 2002–present | n/a |
| U.S. Customshouse and Post Office† | Louisville | | 300 West Liberty Street | D. Ky. | 1858–1896 | n/a |
| U.S. Post Office, Court House & Custom House | Louisville | | 4th & Chestnut Sts. | D. Ky. W.D. Ky. | 1893–1901; 1901–1932; Razed in 1943. | n/a |
| Gene Snyder U.S. Courthouse† | Louisville | | 601 West Broadway | W.D. Ky. | 1932–present | U.S. Rep. Gene Snyder (1986) |
| U.S. Post Office | Owensboro | | ? | D. Ky. W.D. Ky. | 1889–1911; Demolished | n/a |
| U.S. District Court House† | Owensboro | | 423 Frederica Street | W.D. Ky. | 1911–present | n/a |
| U.S. Post Office and Court House | Paducah | | ? | D. Ky. W.D. Ky. | 1883–1938; Demolished | n/a |
| Federal Building & U.S. Courthouse | Paducah | | 501 Broadway | W.D. Ky. | 1938–present | n/a |
| U.S. District Court House | Pikeville | | 110 Main Street | E.D. Ky. | 1932–2025 | n/a |
| U.S. Post Office | Richmond | | 351 West Main Street | E.D. Ky. | 1897–1912; Now used by the Kentucky District Court for Madison County. | n/a |

== Key ==
| ^{†} | Listed on the National Register of Historic Places (NRHP) |
| ^{††} | NRHP-listed and also designated as a National Historic Landmark |
