= History of St. Louis (1981–present) =

The history of St. Louis, Missouri from 1981 to the present has been marked by city beautification and crime prevention efforts, a major school desegregation case, and gentrification in its downtown area. St. Louis also continues to struggle with crime and a declining population, although some improvement has been made in both of these aspects.

== Beautification and crime prevention projects ==
By the late 1970s, urban decay had spread rapidly through St. Louis, described in vivid terms by Kenneth T. Jackson, historian of suburban development:

[St. Louis is] a premier example of urban abandonment. Once the fourth largest city in America, the "Gateway to the West" is now twenty-seventh, a ghost of its former self. In 1940 it contained 816,000 inhabitants: in 1980 the census counted only 453,000. Many of its old neighborhoods have become dispiriting collections of burned-out buildings, eviscerated homes, and vacant lots.... The air is polluted, the sidewalks are filthy, the juvenile crime is horrendous, and the remaining industries are languishing. Grimy warehouses and aging loft factories are landscaped by weed-grown lots adjoining half-used rail yards. Like an elderly couple no longer sure of their purpose in life after their children have moved away, these neighborhoods face an undirected future.

— Kenneth T. Jackson

During the mayoralty of James F. Conway from 1977 to 1981, much of the focus in St. Louis government was on promoting redevelopment projects in downtown St. Louis with the assistance of private investors. However, many in predominantly white south St. Louis perceived these projects as too favorable to the black community, while economic problems such as inflation contributed to a need for city budget cuts. These budget cuts led to the closure of Homer G. Phillips Hospital in north St. Louis, which had served the black community since the 1930s. Conway faced a challenger for his reelection bid in Vincent Schoemehl, a young south St. Louis alderman whose campaign depended on strong support from the black community, and due to the alienation felt in both north and south St. Louis, Schoemehl defeated Conway in the 1980 Democratic primary election. In the general election, Schoemehl narrowly lost the white vote against the Republican candidate, but his overwhelming support from the black community ensured his election as mayor. To gain such support, Schoemehl had promised to reopen Homer G. Phillips Hospital, although after his election he reneged on that promise. Upon the election of as the city's youngest mayor ever in 1981, St. Louis's problems were more significant than many other Rust Belt cities with several major development projects left half-finished and the city's economic base crumbling.

In spite of his broken promise to reopen the hospital, Schoemehl gained popularity through a city beautification project known as "Operation Brightside". Operation Brightside officers were political appointees and not part of the traditional civil service, but they succeeded in planting street trees and flowers (particularly daffodils and tulips) along major streets, distributing plants to homeowners, and providing summer jobs to city youth picking up litter in alleyways. Schoemehl also instituted a safety program to address city crime, starting in 1984. The program, known as Operation SafeStreet, provided low cost or free security measures, such as dead bolts, bars for windows, and The Club. In addition to providing security to homeowners, Schoemehl ordered the blocking of several through streets in neighborhoods around the city to prevent cruising and drug-dealing. Crime declined in targeted neighborhoods by an average of 30 percent, and crime continued to decline in the 1980s until a rise in auto thefts in 1989 increased overall crime rates in the city for that year.

== School desegregation and voluntary transfers ==
Although St. Louis Public Schools legally were desegregated according to plans developed in 1947 and implemented in 1954 after the Brown v Board of Education decision, housing segregation that had developed due to restrictive covenants kept most black St. Louisans in compact areas. Students in St. Louis public schools were given the option of "continuation transfer", meaning that they could stay in their respective schools until graduation, while the policy of "intact busing" allowed whole classes of black students to be transferred to white schools with vacant rooms. These black classes then would eat separate lunches and leave on separate buses from white students, and the combined effect of St. Louis policies maintained a system of desegregation through 1960. During the 1960s, few efforts were made toward changing neighborhood school boundaries so as to promote integration, and predominantly black schools became significantly overcrowded while white schools emptied out.

In 1971, a lawsuit filed against the St. Louis Board of Education by a black parent alleged that the city's schools were segregated, and although local U.S. District Court Judge James Hargrove Meredith ruled against the parent, the decision was overturned in the 8th Circuit Court of Appeals. Judge Gerald Heaney noted that efforts to desegregate schools in St. Louis City might require an interdistrict solution that would involve county schools, and the 8th Circuit returned the case to Meredith for reconsideration. During this period, the NAACP had joined the case by filing suit against suburban school districts alleging their participation in a segregating system prior to 1954, due to their busing of black suburban students into the city based on state segregation laws. Following Meredith's death in 1981, a plan was developed under court order by Edward T. Foote II that attempted to rectify the segregation situation in the city and county districts by having suburban districts voluntarily accept black students from the city. Because the state of Missouri was responsible for the state law that encouraged the initial busing of black students into the city from the county, the state would be required to pay all transportation costs and any cost that the suburban districts incurred in educating the students.

To encourage participation, the court offered to remove districts from the NAACP's lawsuit (resulting in four districts offering to participate), then raised the possibility of consolidating the area's districts into a metropolitan district if more districts did not volunteer (resulting in nearly all suburban districts agreeing to participate). The agreement, signed in early 1983, had five components, with the first encompassing the transfer program. Under the transfer program, all participating suburban districts would increase their African-American student population by 15 percent or reach a student population that was 25 percent black. The second element of the plant called for county students to voluntarily transfer to city magnet schools, a program which peaked in 1997 with nearly 1,500 students. The third component of the plan called for capital improvements to city schools, while the fourth and fifth elements included the financing of the plan, which was to be at the expense of the state of Missouri. The plan was approved by the court in mid-1983, and its provisions entered into effect starting in the 1983–1984 school year.

Political pressures (particularly from Missouri Attorney General John Ashcroft) challenged the implementation of the plan. During the 1984 Missouri gubernatorial campaign, Ashcroft used the issue of busing to his advantage, claiming that the plan was "illegal and immoral". Ashcroft won both the Republican Party primary and the general election by campaigning against the plan. Despite Ashcroft's opposition and legal challenges, the plan significantly desegregated St. Louis schools. In 1980, 82 percent of black students in the city attended all-black schools, while in 1995, only 41 percent did so. By the late 1990s, roughly 13,000 students were enrolled in the transfer program.

At the same time, members of the Missouri General Assembly and Missouri Attorney General Jay Nixon again began attacking the desegregation plan on the grounds of its costs. Nixon proposed that instead of spending money to transfer students, funds would be better spent improving derelict conditions in city schools, a view supported by St. Louis's first black mayor, Freeman Bosley, Jr. After another legal challenge to the plan in early 1996 (based on recent U.S. Supreme Court rulings), the court ordered a review of the plan and a second settlement agreement. A settlement plan developed in the Missouri legislature called for reduced state money for the program and a focus only on funding magnet schools in the city and the voluntary transfer program. All but one of the suburban districts agreed to renew the agreement on these terms (Ladue School District was the exception), and in 1999, the renewed settlement was established. However, under the 1999 agreement, school districts have been permitted to withdraw from the voluntary transfer program starting in 2002, and two districts have done so (Lindbergh School District and Pattonville School District). A five-year extension of the voluntary transfer program was approved in 2007, allowing new enrollments to take place through the 2013–2014 school year in participating districts.

Most of the desegregation under the plan is via transfer of black students to the county rather than in the suburbs-to-city component of the plan: although the plan called for 2,500 white students to enroll in city magnet schools, by the late 1980s, only 600 had done so, and in 2010, only 167 suburban students were enrolled in city schools. In contrast, roughly 6,000 city students are transferred to suburban schools as of 2010 (down from a peak of more than 14,000 in 1999–2000). Other failures included the portion of the plan that was to improve the quality of St. Louis city schools via capital improvement programs; despite considerable funding, the curriculum, course offerings, libraries, and art and music programs in city schools remained weaker than county schools. Among the criticisms of the desegregation program also has been that it weakens city schools by removing talented students to county schools. Despite these issues, the program will continue until all transfer students reach graduation; with the last group of transfer students allowed to enroll in 2013–2014, the program will end after the 2025–2026 school year.

== New construction, gentrification, and rehabilitation ==
During Vincent Schoemehl's three terms in office from 1981 to 1993, downtown St. Louis experienced a growth in construction it had not had since the early 1960s. Among these new buildings was the tallest building in the city, One Metropolitan Square, which featured ... square feet of office space. New retail projects also began to take shape: since 1978, Union Station had been abandoned by Amtrak as a passenger rail terminal, but in 1985, it was reopened as a festival marketplace under the direction of developer James Rouse. The same year, downtown developers opened St. Louis Centre, an enclosed four-story mall costing $176 million with 150 stores and 1,500,000 square feet (140,000 m^{2}) of retail space. By the late 1990s, however, the mall had fallen in favor among shoppers due to the expansion of the St. Louis Galleria in Brentwood, Missouri, and the mall's flagship Dillard's store closed in 2001. The mall itself closed in 2006, and since 2010, development has been underway to convert the mall building into a parking structure, with an adjoining building being converted into apartments, hotel, and retail.

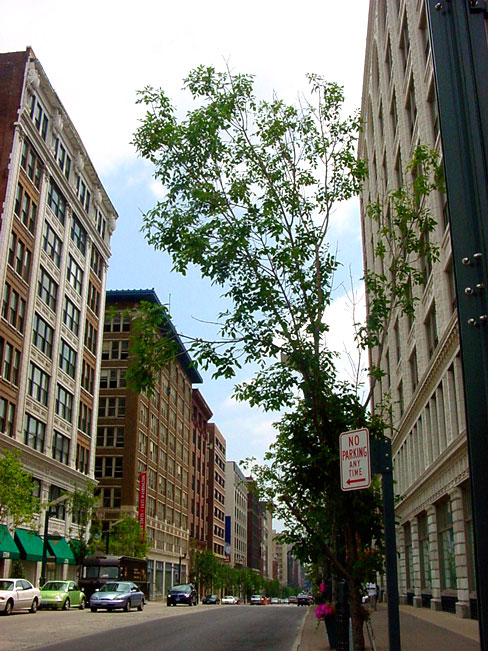
The Washington Avenue Historic District has been the site of several rehabilitation projects since the late 1990s

The city also sponsored a major expansion of the St. Louis Convention Center during the 1980s, and Schoemehl focused efforts on retaining professional sports teams in the city. To that end, the city purchased The Arena, a 15,000-seat venue for professional ice hockey that was home of the St. Louis Blues. In the early 1990s, Schoemehl worked with business groups to develop a new hockey arena (now known as Enterprise Center) on the site of the city's Kiel Auditorium, with the promise that the developer would renovate the adjacent Kiel Opera House. Although the new hockey arena opened in 1994 (and the original arena was demolished in 1999), renovations on the adjacent opera house only began in 2011, more than 15 years after the initial development plan. However, the Kiel Opera House (since renamed Stifel Theatre) reopened on October 1, 2011.

Starting in the early 2000s, a number of rehabilitation and construction projects began in St. Louis, some of which remain incomplete. Among the St. Louis areas to undergo gentrification was the Washington Avenue Historic District, which extends along Washington Avenue from the Edward Jones Dome west almost two dozen blocks. During the early 1990s, garment manufacturers moved out of the large office buildings on the street, and by the end of that decade residential developers began to convert the buildings into lofts. Prices per square foot increased dramatically in the area, and by 2001, nearly 280 apartments were built. Among the Washington Avenue projects to remain in development is the Mercantile Exchange Building, which is being converted to offices, apartments, retail, and a movie theater. The gentrification also has had the effect of increasing the downtown population, with both the central business district and Washington Avenue district more than doubling their population from 2000 to 2010.

Other downtown projects include the renovation of the Old Post Office, which started in 1998 and was completed in 2006. The Old Post Office and seven adjacent buildings had been vacant since the early 1990s, but as of 2010 included a variety of tenants, including a branch of the St. Louis Public Library, a branch of Webster University, the St. Louis Business Journal, and a variety of government offices. The renovation of the Old Post Office spurred development of an adjacent plaza, which is linked to a new $80 million residential building called Roberts Tower, the first new residential construction in downtown St. Louis since the 1970s.

As early as 1999, the St. Louis Cardinals began pushing for the construction of a new Busch Stadium as part of a broader trend in Major League Baseball toward stadium building. In early 2002, plans for a new park were settled among state and local leaders and Cardinals owners. According to an agreement in which the state and city would issue bonds for construction, the Cardinals agreed to build a multipurpose development known as St. Louis Ballpark Village on part of the site of Busch Memorial Stadium. The new stadium opened in 2006. Ballpark Village finished construction in 2014.

The Forest Park Southeast neighborhood near the Missouri Botanical Garden and the old Gaslight Square district are also going through extensive renovations.

The National Geospatial intelligence agency opened up a location in North St. Louis.

== Population and crime issues ==
Population of St. Louis
Year	Pop.	±%
2000	348,189	—
2004	350,705	+0.7%
2006	353,837	+0.9%
2008	356,730	+0.8%
2010	319,294	−10.5%
2012	318,172	−0.4%
Source: "U.S. Census website". United States Census Bureau.

During the mid-2000s, the population of St. Louis began growing following a half-century of decline. Census estimates from 2003 through 2008 were successfully challenged and population figures were revised upward; however, no challenges to 2009 data were permitted. In spite of gains during the 2000s, the 2010 U.S. census showed a steep population decline for St. Louis, and no challenge to the figure has been reported as of 2013.

St. Louis also has significant and persistent problems with both crime and perceptions of crime. St. Louis was named by U.S. News & World Report as the most dangerous city in the United States in 2011, using Uniform Crime Reports data published by the U.S. Department of Justice. In addition, St. Louis was named as the city with the highest crime rate in the United States by CQ Press in 2010, using data reported to the FBI in 2009. Critics of these analyses note that division between St. Louis City and St. Louis County make crime reports for the area appear inflated and that reporting crime differs greatly depending on the localities involved. The FBI itself has cautioned against using the data as a form of ranking, as it presents a too simplistic view of crime. Despite criticisms of the methodology, the rate of city youth to be killed by guns was the second-highest in the United States over a period from 2006 to 2007, according to data released by the U.S. Centers for Disease Control and Prevention. The rate of firearm deaths for the metropolitan statistical area, however, was one-fifth of the city rate.
