= Thomas Crane Young =

American architect

Thomas Crane Young (February 28, 1858 - March 2, 1934) was an American architect. He was part of the Earnes & Young firm with William S. Eames. He served as mayor of Webster Groves, Missouri.

== Early life and education ==
He was born in Sheboygan, Wisconsin. His father was an officer in the Civil War in the 14th Wisconsin regiment. The family moved to Grand Rapids, Michigan before Young left school. He worked for the Grand Rapids and Indiana Railroad and then obtained a scholarship to Washington University in St. Louis, Missouri. After two years he went to Europe to study at the École des Beaux Arts in Paris and at Heidelberg University, after which he took a job in Boston for the architectural firms of Van Brunt & Howe and E. M. Wheelwright.

== Career ==
He joined in business with William S. Eames in St. Louis, forming the form Eames and Young. The firm gained many important commissions, including federal prisons in Atlanta, Georgia, and Leavenworth, Kansas.

Young was opposed to some of the practices of Washington University architectural school, including the requirement for elaborate drawings and the habit of holding architectural competitions, which he described as "undignified ... What other class of men except architects could be induced to risk the money, time and nervous force involved in these expensive contests on so slim a chance of return?"

Young was Mayor of Webster Groves, Missouri, from 1901 to 1903, and President of the St. Louis Chapter of the AIA from 1909 to 1910.

== Sources ==
- "T. C. Young is Dead; St. Louis Architect". The New York Times. March 3, 1934. p. 13.
