= Washington Avenue Historic District (St. Louis, Missouri) =

Historic district in Missouri, United States

- U.S. National Register of Historic Places
- U.S. Historic district
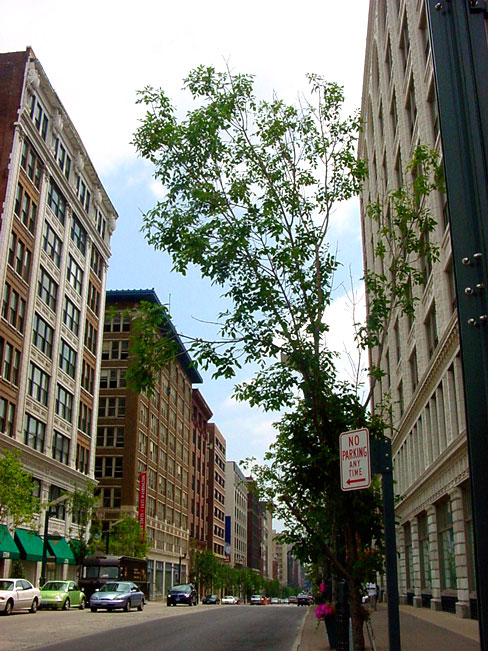
- Street view of the Washington Avenue Loft District

- Location within St. Louis Location within Missouri Location within the United States
- Location: Downtown West, St. Louis, Missouri United States
- Coordinates: 38°37′58.43″N 90°12′9.06″W
- Area: 34 acres (14 ha)
- Built: Various
- Architect: Various
- Architectural style: Chicago, Mission/Spanish Colonial Revival
- NRHP reference No.: 86003733
- Added to NRHP: February 27, 1987

The Washington Avenue Historic District is located in Downtown West, St. Louis, Missouri along Washington Avenue, and bounded by Delmar Boulevard to the north, Locust Street to the south, 8th Street on the east, and 18th Street on the west. The buildings date from the late 19th century to the early 1920s. They exhibit a variety of popular architectural styles of those years, but most are revival styles or in the commercial style that would later come to be known as the Chicago School of architecture. Most are large multi-story buildings of brick and stone construction, built as warehouses for the St. Louis garment district. Many have terra cotta accents on their facades. After World War II, the decline in domestic garment production and the preference for single-story industrial space led to many of the buildings being vacant or underused due to functional obsolescence.

The district includes:

- Ely and Walker Dry Goods Company Building (1906–07), designed by Eames & Young, now a residential loft building.
- Lesser-Goldman/Ferguson-McKinney Building (1901) at the northwest corner of Washington and W. 12th, also designed by Eames & Young. It is "A half-block in size and enriched with classical, round arches with voussoirs and keystones, quoins, and a copiously enriched cornice, the building was in keeping with the standards of architectural design of "the great commercial warehouses which are making Washington Avenue a monumental street." The building has piers defining 13 bays on its Washington Avenue facade and nine bays on its Tucker Boulevard facade. It has distinctive quoins. It has several large, round-arched openings with voussoirs. The main entrance, at center of the Washington Ave. facade, is surrounded with terra cotta work and set with a large scrolled keystone. Above, windows are in sets of twos or threes separated by brick mullions or pilaster-like piers. At the seventh story, "the piers curve to form round arches with keystones. Spandrels between the stories are ornamented with scrolled corbels."

== Redevelopment ==
The area began to experience some redevelopment in the 1990s. In 1998, the state of Missouri adopted a tax credit for the redevelopment of historic buildings, making large-scale renovation financially feasible. Local and national developers have acquired many buildings along Washington Avenue and in other parts of downtown. The buildings are being redeveloped with loft-style condominia and apartments.

== See also ==
- Landmarks of St. Louis
- Stix, Baer, Fuller, the once leading department store founded in 1892, on Washington Ave.
