= Ely Walker Lofts =

- Ely and Walker Dry Goods Company Building
- U.S. Historic district – Contributing property
- Location within St. Louis Location within Missouri Location within the United States
- Location: 1520 Washington Avenue, St. Louis, Missouri
- Coordinates: 38.632589°N 90.202239°W
- Built: 1906-07
- Architect: Eames & Young
- Part of: Washington Avenue Historic District (ID86003733)
- Designated CP: February 27, 1987

Ely Walker Lofts (originally known as the Ely and Walker Dry Goods Company Building) is a building located at 1520 Washington Avenue in St. Louis, Missouri.

In 1857, David Davis Walker, a member of the Bush family, arrived in St. Louis from Illinois. (Walker would become the great-grandfather of future president George H. W. Bush and first cousin of Supreme Court Justice and Independent U.S. Senator from Illinois David Davis, a pivotal figure in the disputed presidential election of 1876.) In 1880, he and Frank Ely founded Ely, Walker & Company, which became a leading dry goods wholesaler west of the Mississippi River and was acquired by Burlington Industries after World War II.

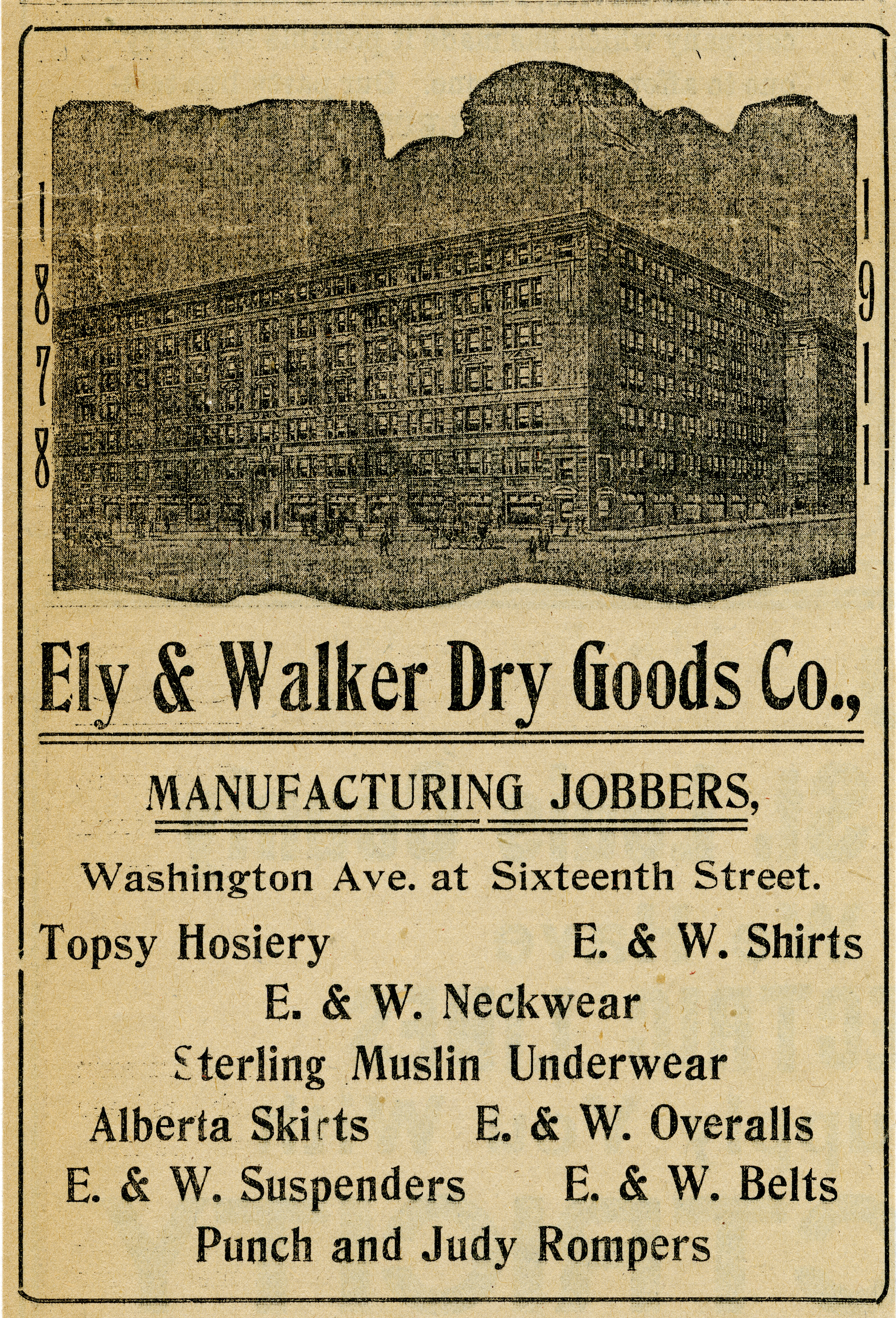
1911 advertisement showing the Ely Walker building

Presently, the company needed a warehouse for warehouse for shoes, Catholic school uniforms, and gun holsters. It commissioned Eames & Young, a St. Louis architecture firm active between 1885 and 1927 that designed several buildings on the National Register of Historic Places. William Eames, one of its founders and the uncle of architect Charles Eames, was president of the American Institute of Architects from 1904 until 1905.

Built in 1906 and 1907, the building was designed to be fireproof, with steel-frame and hollow tile floors, and with brick and terra cotta sheathing. Its main facades are north on Washington Avenue, with 15 bays, and south on St. Charles Street. Its east and west facades are also exposed and are similar to the Washington Avenue facade. It has a two-story base level "with vermiculated terra cotta 'quoins' which alternate with terra cotta quoins of smooth finish. At the upper stories, the piers are clad in brick with terra cotta accents. The terra cotta ornament includes a variety of Classical Revival motifs--broken pediments above the 4th-floor windows, garlands at the 7th story and foliated ornament at the cornice. Dark gray terracotta ornaments the spandrels at several stories. Especially noteworthy is the monumental entrance featuring ornamental terra cotta in a foliated cable design surmounted by an elaborate cartouche. There is a small, three-bay, one story section at the east end of the building clad in similar materials." About the space provided by this building, Ely and Walker was described, a few years later, as having the "'largest merchandise floors in America'".

It is a contributing building in the Washington Avenue Historic District, which is listed in the National Register of Historic Places. The district comprises 55 commercial buildings constructed between 1899 and 1931 with over 75 percent of these buildings designed by prominent architects. The seven-story Ely Walker building is the second-largest of these 55 buildings and is known for its terracotta ornamentation. The building is now used for residential apartments. Many other Washington Avenue landmarks have also been converted to residential housing.

Other Ely Walker buildings include the Ely and Walker Shirt Factory No. 5 in Kennett, Missouri, which added to the National Register of Historic Places in 2008, and buildings which were located in the Missouri cities of Illmo, Salem, Vandalia, and Warrenton; and in Paragould, Arkansas.
