= Ely and Walker Shirt Factory No. 5 =

- U.S. National Register of Historic Places
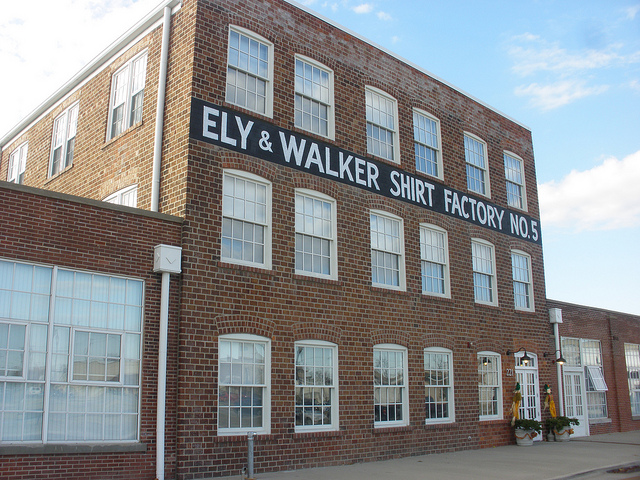
- Ely & Walker Shirt Factory, September 2012

- Location within Missouri Location within the United States
- Location: 221 S Main St., Kennett, Missouri
- Coordinates: 36°14′7″N 90°3′26″W
- Area: less than one acre
- Built: 1923, 1934, 1936, 1937
- Built by: Meiner, M; Taylor, J.W.
- NRHP reference No.: 07001319
- Added to NRHP: March 12, 2008

Ely and Walker Shirt Factory No. 5 is a historic factory located at Kennett, Dunklin County, Missouri. It was built in 1923, with additions in 1934, 1936 and 1937. The original three-story section measures 50 feet by 154 feet and is of heavy timber-frame construction with a brick exterior. The later additions are steel frame construction. The factory closed in the mid-1980s.

It was listed on the National Register of Historic Places in 2008.

== See also ==
- Ely and Walker Dry Goods Company Building
