= Port of Mayagüez =

Port located in Mayagüez, Puerto Rico

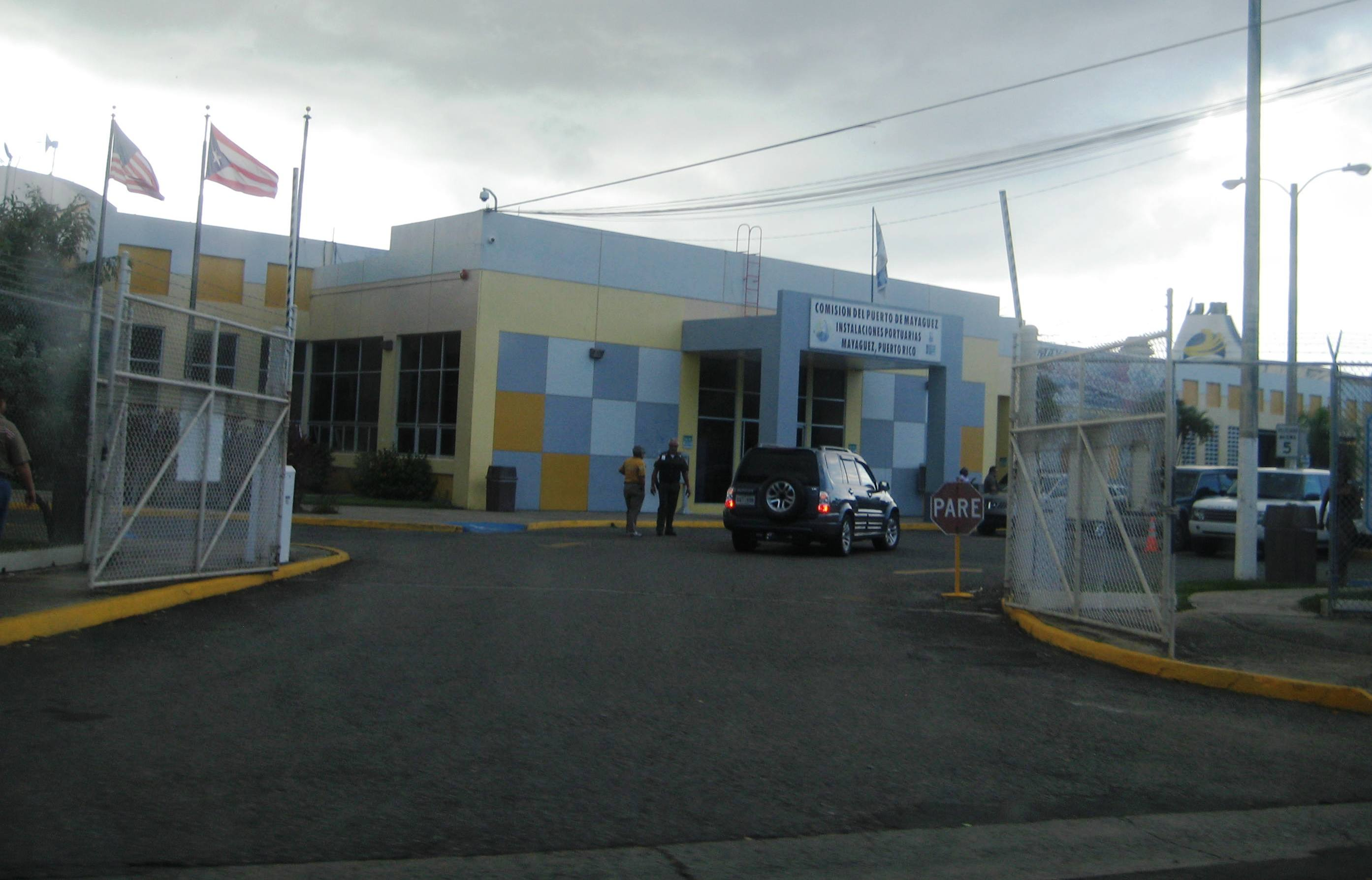
- Port of Mayagüez passenger terminal
- Interactive map of Port of Mayagüez

Location
- Location: Mayagüez, Puerto Rico
- Coordinates: 18°13′06.47″N 67°09′36.70″W
- UN/LOCODE: PR MAZ

Details
- Operated by: Holland Group Port Mayagüez Inc.
- Owned by: Mayagüez Port Commission
- Type of harbour: Coastal Natural
- No. of wharfs: 4
- Cranes: 0-24 Ton Lifts
- Channel depth: 16 feet (4.9 m) - 20 feet (6.1 m)

Statistics
- Passenger traffic: 170,000
- Main export: Tuna

The Port of Mayagüez, located northwest of downtown Mayagüez in Mayagüez Bay, is the third busiest port on Puerto Rico. The port is situated along Puerto Rico routes 64, 341, and 3341, and stretches for 3.8 miles along the coast. Its main canal is 0.4 miles wide and its depth ranges from 47 to 120 feet; the water's depth along the piers ranges between 28 and 29 feet. The port is protected from rough seas by reefs which run along its northern and western sections.

Until April 2010, the port's main tenant was Ferries del Caribe which provided daily ferry service to the Dominican Republic. Its sole vessel, Caribbean Express (1976/ 18,888 gt) was scrapped at Alang in late 2010. Since March 2011, ferry service to the Dominican Republic has been offered by America Cruise Ferries. During the Winter 2010/2011 cruise season, the port was visited periodically by ships of the Holland America Line, including the MS Prinsendam.

== History ==
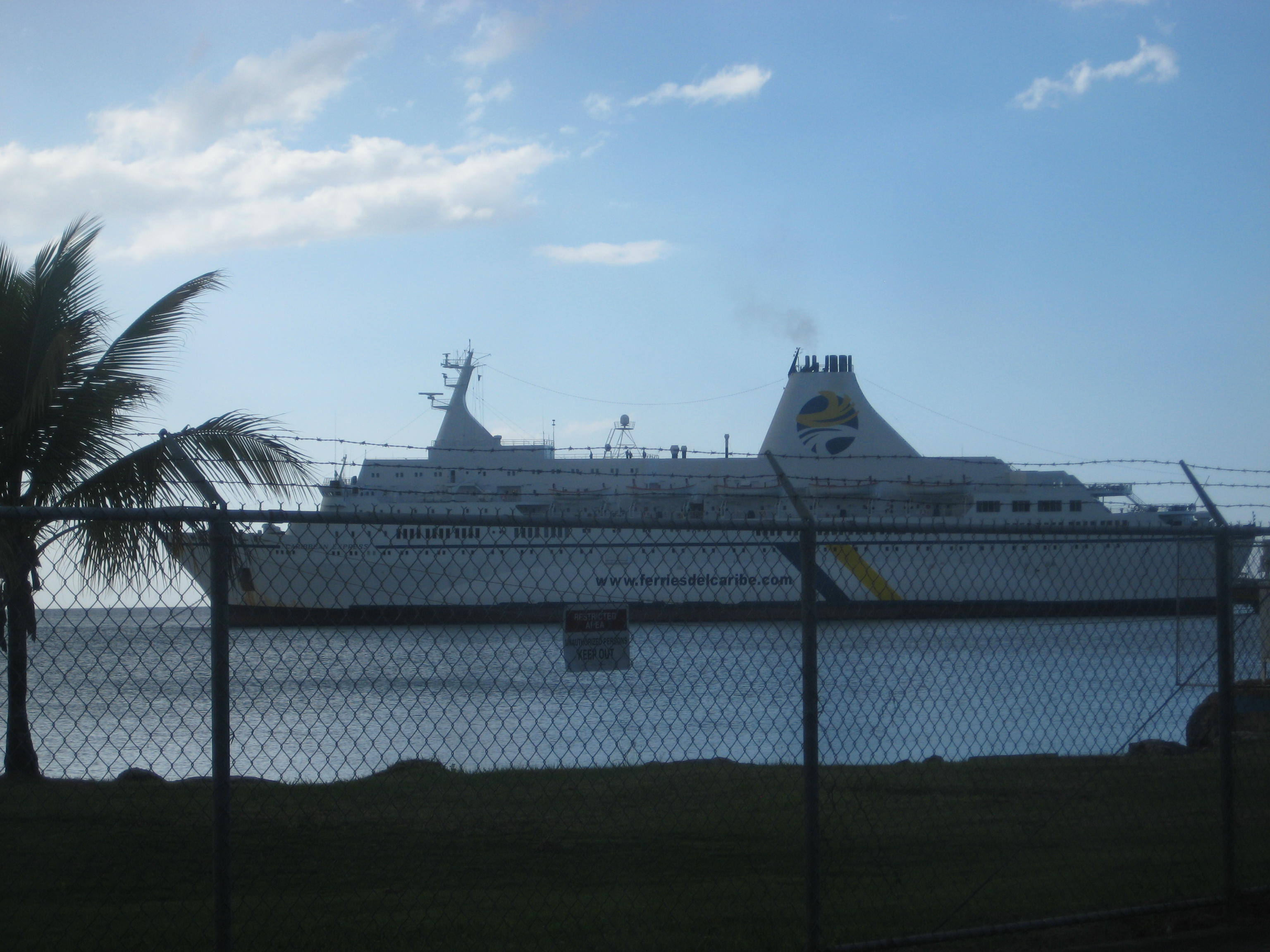
The Mayagüez to Santo Domingo ferry docked at the Port of Mayagüez

By 1754, six years before being officially declared a town, the Mayagüez Bay was already identified by name in the cartography of the era. Yet until the middle of the seventeen hundreds there was no official commercial activity with the metropolis, contraband was the only commerce that existed.

The Royal Decree of Graces of 1815 stimulated the immigration of foreigners with money and slaves. By 1838 the Customs House or Aduana was opened.

From 1813 to 1824, 1818 to 1820 and 1826 to 1827 it became the largest exporter of goods to the international markets in all of Puerto Rico. In 1827 a road was constructed from the city center to the port area. In 1858, the Cyclopedia of Commerce and Commercial Navigation identified the port of Mayagüez as the most important port in the island of Puerto Rico.

Being one of the main ports in Spanish Puerto Rico, the Municipal Government had built a dock and a longhouse to facilitate the loading and unloading of goods by 1836. For some time it was maintained by municipal funds until 1886 when the "Junta de Obras del Puerto" begun to operate the facilities. Its modern incarnation was built in 1935 as the "Mayagüez Shipping Terminal". In 1959 it became property of the Puerto Rico Ports Authority. At one time before 1940 it became the main port for exporting sugar from Puerto Rico. It is presently owned by the Municipal Government of Mayagüez and since 2007 it is administered by Holland Group.

== See also ==
- Transportation in Puerto Rico
- Port of San Juan
- Port of Ponce
