= Mayagüez Bay =

Bay located in western Puerto Rico

Coordinates: 18°12′N 67°10′W

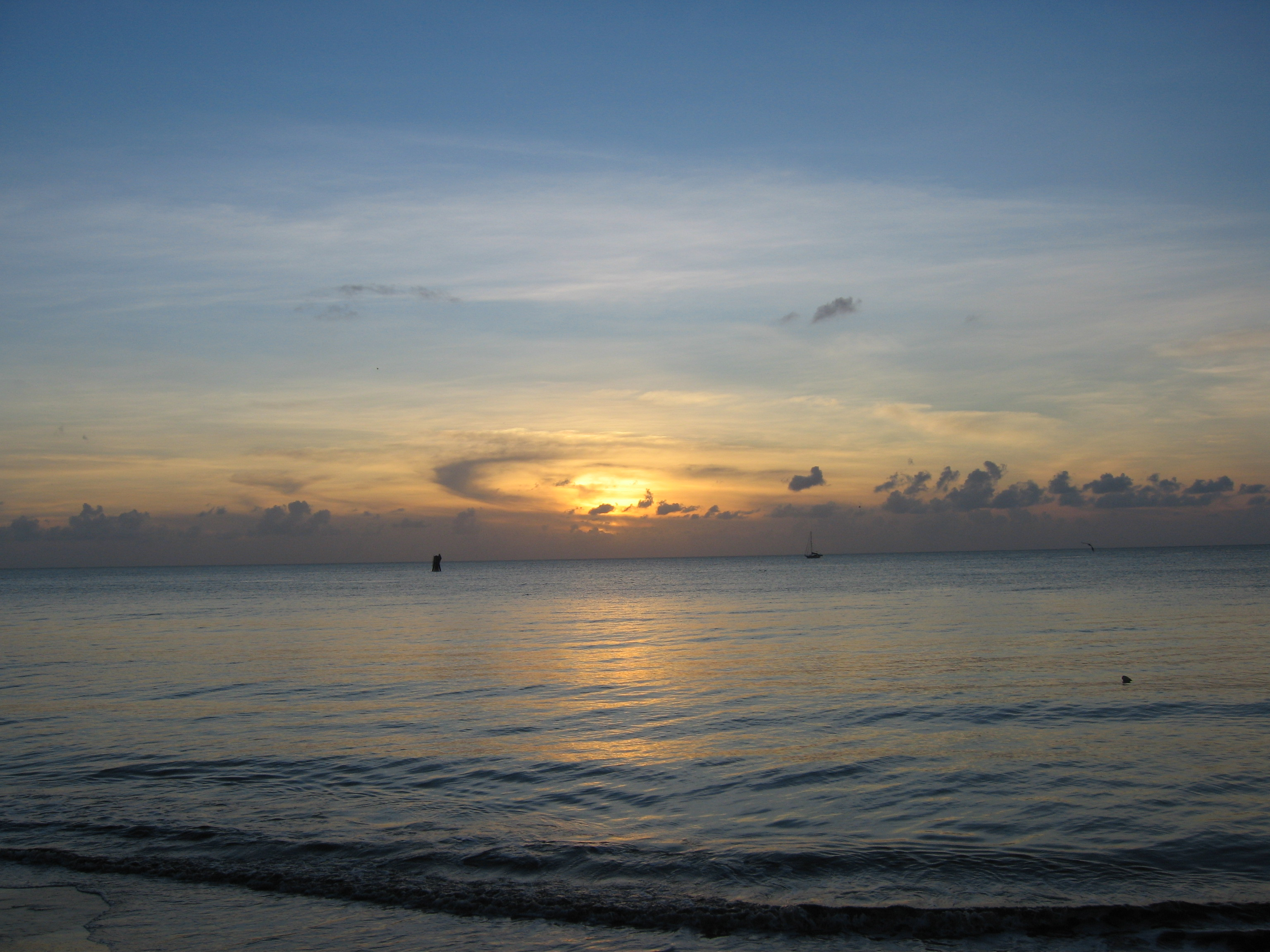
Mayagüez Bay at sunset

Mayagüez Bay (Spanish: Bahía de Mayagüez) is a bay located in western Puerto Rico.

The bay has recently been opened to the city of Mayagüez with the building of the Parque del Litoral because of the 2010 Central American and Caribbean Games. The Port of Mayagüez is located in the bay. The Yagüez River empties into the bay.

== See also ==
- San Juan Bay
- Transportation in Puerto Rico
