= Yagüez River =

River of Puerto Rico

- Native name: Río Yagüez (Spanish)

Location
- Commonwealth: Puerto Rico
- Municipality: Mayagüez

Physical characteristics
- Source
  - location: Urayoán Mountains
  - coordinates: 18.2080099°N 67.1549019°W
- Length: 13 mi (21 km)

The Yagüez River (Spanish: Río Yagüez) is a river located in western Puerto Rico.

The Yagüez originates at 1,200 feet (370 m) above sea-level in the Urayoán Mountains to the southeast of Las Marias and to the northeast of Maricao. From its inception the river runs roughly east to west for 13 miles (21 km) emptying into Mayagüez Bay just west of downtown Mayagüez next to the northern part of the Parque del Litoral.

During its course, the river traverses the Mayagüez Reservoir located between the Bateyes and Limón barrios of Mayagüez. To protect against flash flooding, the river is canalized throughout the majority of its path through Mayagüez's urban core. The first attempt to canalize the river was when Don Leonardo de Campos was mayor of Mayagüez in 1852, but the difficulties of the project did not allow it back then. The river flooded the city in 1933.

== See also ==
- List of rivers of Puerto Rico
