= United States Customs House (Fajardo, Puerto Rico) =

Historic place in Fajardo, Puerto Rico

- U.S. Custom House
- U.S. National Register of Historic Places
- Puerto Rico Historic Sites and Zones
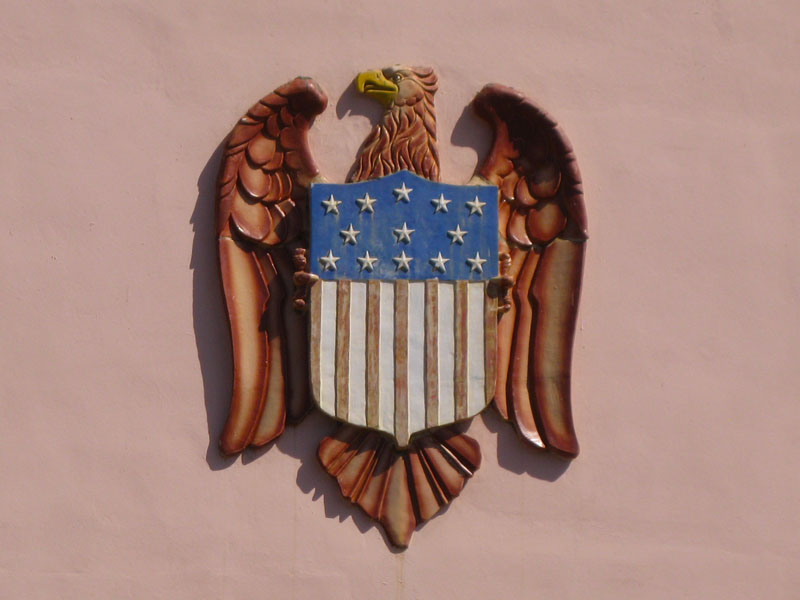

- Location within Puerto Rico
- Location: 500 Calle Union; Fajardo, Puerto Rico
- Coordinates: 18°20′02″N 65°37′50″W
- Area: less than one acre
- Built: 1930
- Architect: Albert B.Nichols
- MPS: United States Custom Houses in Puerto Rico MPS
- NRHP reference No.: 88000077
- RNSZH No.: 2000-(RE)-18-JP-SH

Significant dates
- Added to NRHP: February 12, 1988
- Designated RNSZH: May 16, 2001

The U.S. Customs House, (Spanish: Aduana de Fajardo), located at Calle Union, Fajardo, Puerto Rico, was constructed in 1930. The poured-concrete building is significant architecturally and historically for the role it played in the first, transitional phase of the American customs service in Puerto Rico, from 1898 through 1931. This period is bracketed on one end by the cession, on December 10, 1898, of the island of Puerto Rico to the United States by Spain as a condition of the Treaty of Paris ending the Spanish–American War, and on the other by the completion in 1931 of the major building and rehabilitation program undertaken by the U.S. Customs Service following World War I.

== Historical background ==
While the Fajardo Custom House is the least imposing of the customhouses included in this multiple-resource nomination, it is still more impressive than those at Arecibo, Arroyo and Aguadilla, which were constructed during the same period but are no longer owned by the United States Customs Service. Its amplified Spanish Colonial-Revival style is in keeping with the somber economic import of its construction date, and the building provides a feeling of permanence and dignity in a minimally developed area. It was designed by Albert B. Nichols, architect and building inspector, Puerto Rico Field Office of the Supervising Architect of the Treasury. Ten sheets of drawings of the Fajardo construction signed by Nichols (out of a total of twelve sheets) are in the San Juan Custom House files.

Fajardo was in use as a port of entry at the end of the Spanish era and through much of the early American period. A small plain customhouse of the Spanish period is known to have exited here.

== Building description ==
The United States Custom house in Fajardo's Puerto Real was built in 1930 on a waterfront site which was originally directly on the beach, without a street. Today, the first and second floor of the building are used by the U.S. Custom Service and part of the first floor by the U.S. Postal Service. Part of the second floor is believed to have formerly been the residence for the customs port director, although the architect's drawings indicate only office use.

The customhouse is a 2 1/2-story, rectangular-plan, poured-concrete and concrete-frame structure with a rear one-story-with-roof-terrace wing, also of concrete. The main portion of the building is 33'0" by 49'0" and the rear wing is 16'6" by 49'0". The waterside east elevation is three bays wide with an original entrance door in the northernmost bay. Each first-floor bay on the east and north elevations has a large round-arch opening. As part of the extensive alterations of 1975, the other two east elevation arches have been, blocked in except for small central windows and the corner opening last brick in the arch.

The two openings on the north left and center retain their original doors and decorative iron and griHework and Terra-cotta. The right-hand opening to the post office is a plain arch opening replacing the original rolled-steel door.

There is a terra-cotta string course with four crests between the floors on the east side. On the second floor of the east side, the end bays have modern paired windows and the center bay has one paired and one single metal window of 1975. There are three gabled dormers each with copper louvers instead of windows. The roof is covered with red Spanish tile. The south side windows have been replaced by glass blocks while the original double board door remains in the center. The north and present front elevation on Calle Union is a gable end and is three bays wide on the first floor, two bays upstairs. Above the filled-in attic fan window, on either end is a standard for a flagpole.

The building is in generally sound condition but with significant alterations made in 1975. There has been some modification of the original plan on both floors which has caused elimination of some of the architectural elements and the incorporation of new materials and techniques with no historical relationship to the building's original appearance. These changes include the installation of wall mounted air-conditioners and acoustical-tile suspended ceilings, removal of decorative ironwork, blocking of openings, and replacement of original metal casement windows with modern metal windows. The second-floor east windows were originally steel casement-awning sash, with four sets in the center flanked by pairs at the sides. The south side had two pairs of windows and the north side was single windows. The casement windows are two eight-light casement sash topped with two four-light awning windows.

The first-floor plan of the building is based on the division of the space by a wall that runs the length of the building north to south and divides the space into two approximately 15' wide rectangles that are then subdivided by partitions, creating small rooms and offices.

At the northeast corner of the building is the entrance lobby principal public space of the original building. Approximately 15' × 10*8", it contains a simple, single-turn staircase to the second floor along the west side and features a masonry rail. The southern wall contains an ornamented cashier's window and door, all with wrought-iron decorative grilles. The door provides entrance to the general office behind. The floor is quarry tile. The general office, approximately 15 x 22 feet, has a suspended acoustical-tile ceiling, as does the next and last room on this side, the port director's office. The western half of the customhouse contains storage and warehouse area, except for the northwest corner, which is partitioned for the U.S. Post Office, Puerto Real branch of Fajardo, located in what was originally warehouse space.

There is a small L-shaped lobby and two customer windows. The second floor is devoted to general working area and offices, along with a kitchen, bathroom and the roof terrace over the rear wing. A portion is believed to have been originally used as the Port Director's residence, as noted. Portions of the terrace have now been closed in or roofed. On the exterior, the first floor windows and doors on the north and east elevations are placed in large, slightly recessed arched openings, creating an arcade along the base of the building. Only the three doors on the north elevation have wood-paneled double doors. Only the original east entrance door, the present north entrance door and the north center door retain their original decorative glazed tiles in the lintels over the door. Only the north left and north center doors retain the decorative iron grille-work in the arch. The north center door has also retained its original ornamental ironwork gate in front of the wooden door. Between the second floor windows on the north side there is a large Terra-cotta U.S. Customs Service crest. On the east elevation the words, "U.S. Custom House," are located in masonry letters above the first-floor windows. On the interior, the lobby retains its original, ceiling, quarry-tile floor, and steps with polished-concrete treads. The original ornamental iron grille survives in the upper panel of the door to the general office and the cashier's window beside it.

The other floors are covered with vinyl tile, and the ceilings are obscured by suspended acoustical 2x4 tile. On the second floor there are a few places where the original gypsum ceiling and simple cornice moldings are still visible. There is a ladder and scuttle opening to the attic, which is unusable space filled with roof trusses and concrete framing. The rear of the building is plain. The first floor initially had small, fixed, steel sash, now closed in. On the second floor, opening to the original porch, are five doors and three windows from the original plan. There is a 1975 iron fence around the north and east sides of the building, and a masonry wall is on the south lot line. There were originally decorative posts and gate at the south side of the building.

Ten of the twelve architect's drawings for this building, by Albert B. Nichols, Architect and Inspector of Buildings, survive in the files of the San Juan Customs House.

== Today ==
The United States Customs House in Fajardo, Puerto Rico still in active status under the jurisdiction of the U.S. Customs and Border Protection. Its mission is to enforce various provisions of the customs and navigations law. This building is listed on the U.S. National Register of Historic Places since February 12, 1988, and it was added to the Puerto Rico Register of Historic Sites and Zones in 2000. The U.S. Postal Service Puerto Real branch was relocated to another location near the custom house at Calle Union in Fajardo.

== See also ==
- United States Custom House (Mayagüez, Puerto Rico)
- United States Customs House (Ponce, Puerto Rico)
