= United States Custom House (Mayagüez, Puerto Rico) =

Historic building located in Mayagüez, Puerto Rico

- Customs House
- U.S. National Register of Historic Places
- Puerto Rico Historic Sites and Zones
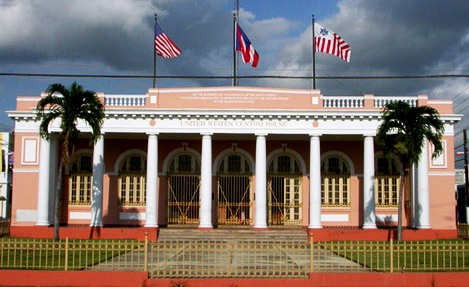

- Location within Puerto Rico
- Location: Comercio, Candelaria (former McKinley), Manuel Pirallo and Aduana Streets; Mayagüez, Puerto Rico
- Coordinates: 18°12′23.27″N 67°9′4.96″W
- Area: less than one acre
- Built: 1838
- Architect: Rafael Carmoega
- Architectural style: Beaux-arts
- MPS: United States Custom Houses in Puerto Rico MPS
- NRHP reference No.: 88000076
- RNSZH No.: 2003-25-(1-9) JP-SH

Significant dates
- Added to NRHP: February 10, 1988
- Designated RNSZH: January 24, 2003

The U.S. Customs House or "Edificio Aduana" is a historic custom house building located at Mayagüez, Puerto Rico. As of February 10, 1988, the building was owned by the U.S. Customs Service, Washington, D.C.

== History ==
Aduana building in 1917, still with two floors

It was built in 1838 to accommodate and lodge distinguished visitors that reached the port of Mayagüez. In 1898 the building became a custom house. It originally had two floors but the second story was destroyed by the earthquake of 1918. Its present architectonic line is from the year 1924, being the work of engineers Huiguera and Besosa, being its architect Mr. Rafael Carmoega. On September 30, 1981, it was declared a Historical Building of the United States.

== Architecture ==
The U.S. Customs House is considered the most important construction of the city of Mayagüez in attention to its general aesthetic values. It is a building of "anfipróstilo" (two portals) style. The building is surrounded by arches and semi-pilasters that are reminiscent of the neoclassical style of Roman influence. The structure's upper portions are adorned with plates and "dentellones" of baroque influence. Its interior is of Renaissance aesthetics of the Michelangelo style. The structure is manufactured completely in reinforced concrete and the floors are terrazzo edged with white marble.

== See also ==
- United States Customs House (Fajardo, Puerto Rico)
- United States Customs House (Ponce, Puerto Rico)
