= United States Post Office, Court House, and Custom House (Louisville, Kentucky, 1893) =

Second Louisville federal building (1893–1932)

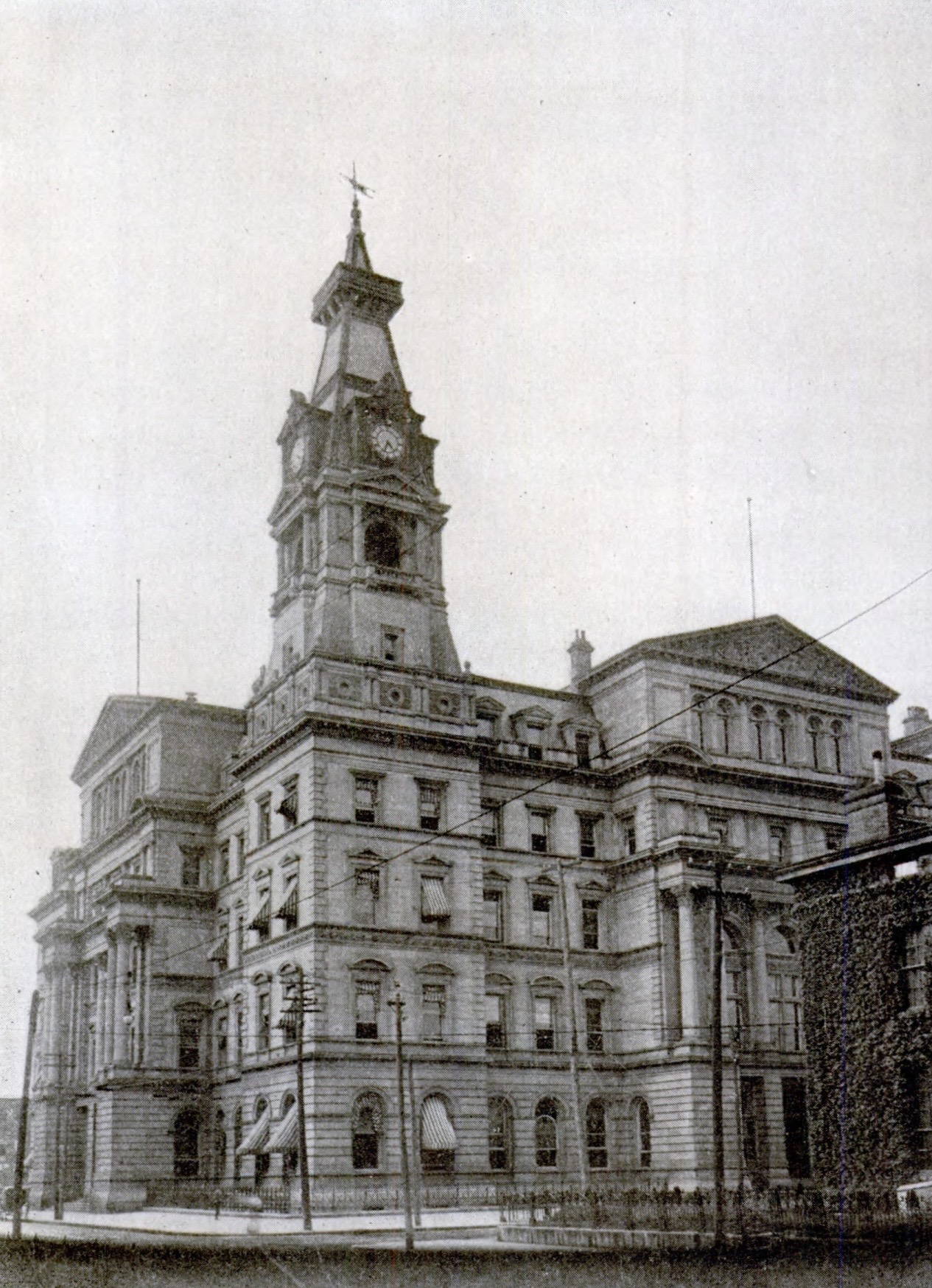
- Treasury Department photo c. 1901
- Interactive map of the United States Post Office, Court House, and Custom House area

General information
- Coordinates: 38.2495°N 85.7573°W
- Opened: 1893
- Closed: 1932
- Demolished: 1943

The United States Post Office, Court House, and Custom House was a U.S. federal building in Louisville, Kentucky that served as the seat of the United States District Court for the District of Kentucky and its successor, the United States District Court for the Western District of Kentucky, from 1893 to 1932. The five-story courthouse hosted about 100 offices and was located at the northeast corner of Fourth and Chestnut streets. The building's copper-clad clock tower was an important city landmark of its day. The building was vacated following the New Deal-era construction of what is now known as the Gene Snyder United States Courthouse, and finally demolished during World War II, in a part due to wartime scarcity of metal for industrial uses.

== History ==
In the 1880s it was determined that the city had outgrown the 1853 custom-house. In 1883, the U.S. government paid US$110,000 (equivalent to $3,800,893 in 2025) for the land. Construction of the new federal building went fairly slowly, with the cornerstone laid on October 3, 1886, and full occupancy not until October 1893. The post office moved 70 letter carriers and 130 clerks into the building in April 1892, and the building was complete "except for the elevators" in June 1893. The total area of the building was 3,115,235 ft^{3}, and the total cost was US$110,084.92 (equivalent to $3,944,710 in 2025).

The exterior was constructed of Indiana limestone, and the interiors were said to be lined with "antique oak" woodwork and Georgia marble "inlaid with Tennessee marble." The building was meant to be even more ornate—architectural drawings show "never-placed statuary." Technical features included "exhaust steam heat, mechanical ventilating apparatus, an electric-lighting plant, [and] eight horizontal tubular boilers." The clock tower was clad in copper, and the frosted-glass clock face was backlit at night, originally by gas lights and later by electric bulbs. The clock operated in conjunction with a bell mechanism; a five-pound hammer tolled the time by striking a quarter-ton bell.

The post office was located on the first floor, the courtrooms and law-enforcement offices on the second, and the third and fourth floors were occupied by offices of various federal bureaus and agencies, including the Revenue Service, Pension Agency, Custom Department, Railway Mail Service, the Steamboat Inspectors, the United States Signal Service (later the National Weather Service), and offices of the United States Marine Hospital, etc.

In 1931, as part of the federal government's New Deal response to the Great Depression, Congress allocated almost $3 million for a new federal building in Louisville. Construction was completed well ahead of schedule, and the Post Office moved into its new quarters in November 1932, followed rapidly by other federal agencies and the courts. The clock was wound for the last time and stopped keeping time in December 1932.

The old federal building languished as a derelict eyesore occupied only by starlings until 1942, when it was finally to be torn down, under auspices of the War Production Board and the Works Progress Administration. Among other things the building was seen as a valuable source of scrap amongst wartime shortages of metal for industrial use. There was also interest in salvaging the building's eight Corinthian columns, which weighed 13 tons each, although it was unclear if they could be removed intact. The building was finally knocked over in summer 1943, at which time officials recovered the building's lead-lined cornerstone. The cornerstone contained mostly old newspapers and documents, but also an empty bottle that had once held crab-apple cider and that had apparently replaced the bottle of Kentucky bourbon whisky that was supposed to have been sealed up for posterity.

== Gallery ==
Louisville federal building, in use 1893–1932
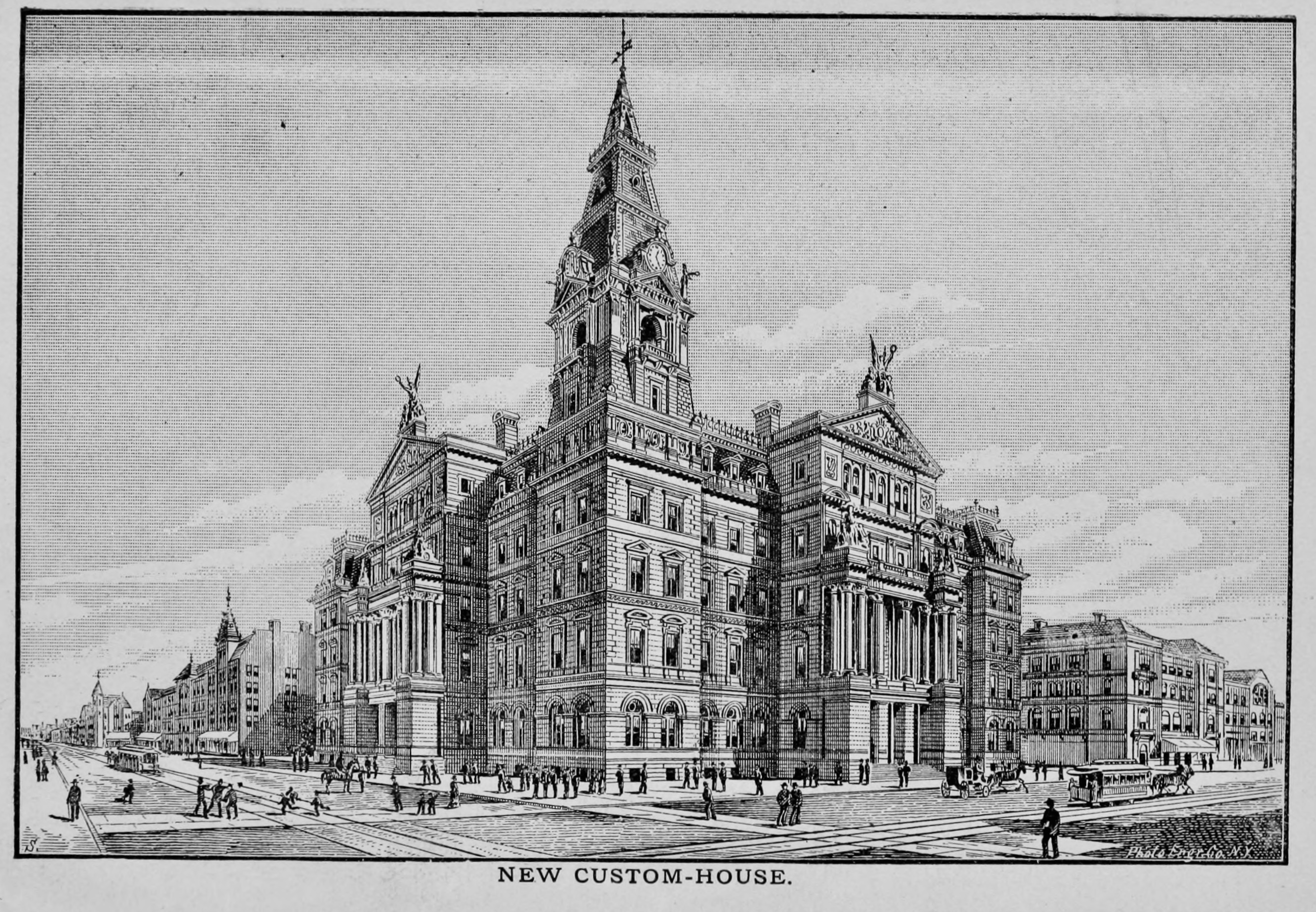
"New Custom-House" Louisville, Kentucky, 1886 image taken from architectural plans

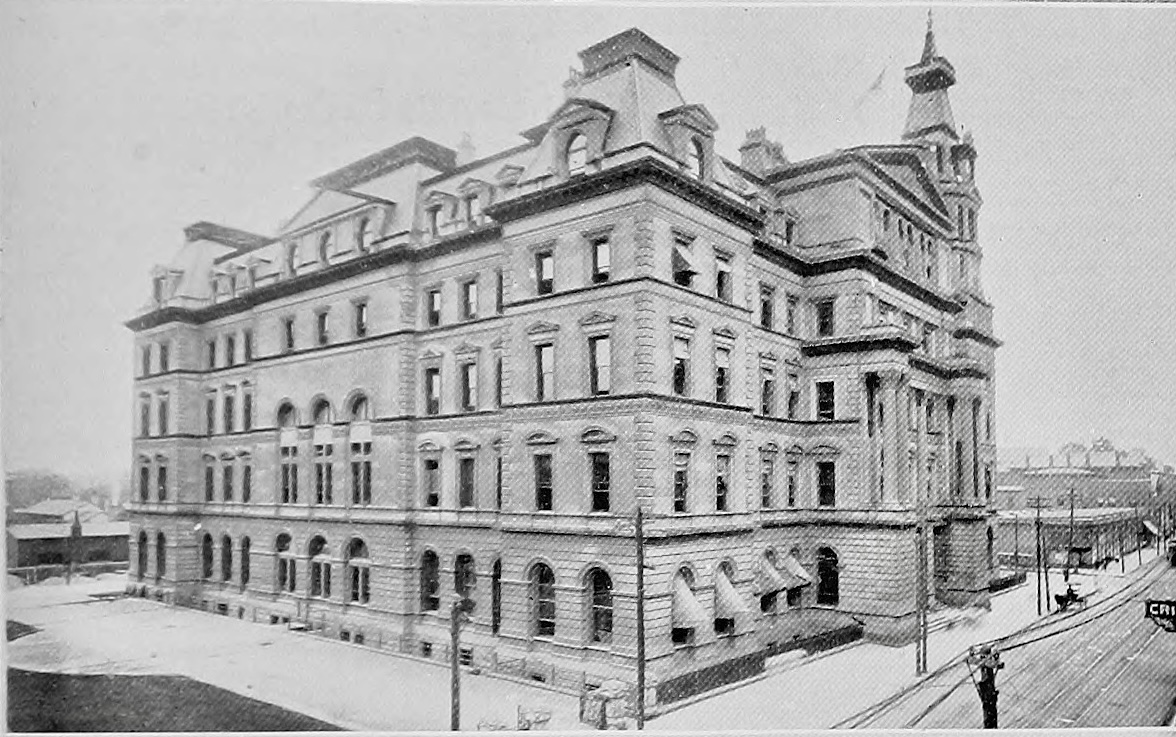
United States Custom House and Post Office in Louisville Kentucky circa 1915

== See also ==
- List of United States federal courthouses in Kentucky
- List of U.S. post offices
