= Office of the Supervising Architect for the U.S. Treasury =

Former agency of the United States Treasury Department

The Office of the Supervising Architect was an agency of the United States Treasury Department that designed federal government buildings from 1852 to 1939.

== About ==
The office handled some of the most important architectural commissions of the nineteenth and twentieth centuries. Among its creations are the well-known State, War, and Navy building (now the Eisenhower Executive Office Building) in Washington, DC, the San Francisco Mint Building, and smaller post offices that have served communities for decades, many recognized as National Historic Landmarks, listed in the National Register of Historic Places, or designated as local landmarks.

== Tarsney Act ==
Until 1893 the office used in-house architects. In 1893 Missouri congressman John Charles Tarsney introduced a bill that allowed the Supervisory Architect to have competitions among private architects for major structures. Competitions were held for the Alexander Hamilton U.S. Custom House, Cleveland Federal Building, U.S. Post Office and Courthouse in Baltimore, Maryland, and U.S. Customhouse in San Francisco (which are all now on the National Register of Historic Places) among others. The competitions were met with enthusiasm by the architect community but were also marred by scandal as when Taylor picked Cass Gilbert for the New York Customs job. Taylor and Gilbert had been members of the Gilbert & Taylor architecture firm in St. Paul, Minnesota. In 1913 the act was repealed.

== Heads of the Office of the Supervising Architect ==
- Robert Mills, as Federal Architect, 1836 to 1842
- Ammi B. Young, as Architectural Advisor, 1842 to 1852
- Ammi B. Young, 1852 to 1862 (first Supervising Architect per se)
- Isaiah Rogers, 1863 to 1865
- Alfred B. Mullett, 1865 to 1874
- William Appleton Potter, 1874 to 1877
- James G. Hill, 1877 to 1883
- Mifflin E. Bell, 1883 to 1886
- William Alfred Freret, 1887 to 1888
- James H. Windrim, 1889 to 1890
- Willoughby J. Edbrooke, 1891 to 1892
- Jeremiah O'Rourke, 1893 to 1894
- William Martin Aiken, 1895 to 1896
- James Knox Taylor, 1897 to 1912
- Oscar Wenderoth, 1913 to 1914
- James A. Wetmore, as Acting Supervising Architect, 1915 to 1933
- Louis A. Simon, 1933 to 1939

== See also ==
- Architect of the Capitol
- William Wilson Cooke
