= United States Customs House (Ponce, Puerto Rico) =

Historic building located in Ponce, Puerto Rico

- U.S. Custom House
- U.S. National Register of Historic Places
- Puerto Rico Historic Sites and Zones
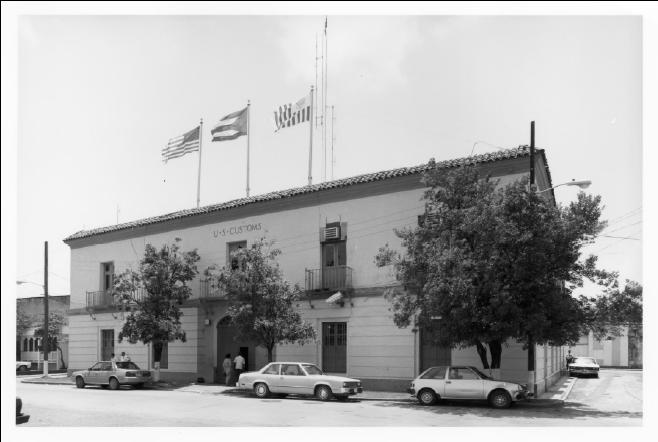
- U.S. Customs House in Ponce, Puerto Rico. General view, looking northwest (June 1987)

- Location within Puerto Rico
- Location: Bonaire and Aduana Streets, Playa de Ponce, Puerto Rico
- Coordinates: 17.98035°N 66.62097°W
- Area: <1 acre (0.40 ha)
- Built: 1842
- Architect: Albert B. Nichols
- Architectural style: Spanish Colonial
- NRHP reference No.: 88000073
- RNSZH No.: 2001-(RS)-23-JP-SH

Significant dates
- Added to NRHP: 10 February 1988
- Designated RNSZH: May 16, 2001

The U.S. Customs House (Spanish: Aduana de Ponce), located at Bonaire and Aduana streets in barrio La Playa, Ponce, Puerto Rico, is the oldest customs house in Puerto Rico, and the only one of its type under the U.S. flag. As of 10 February 1988, the building was owned by the U.S. Customs Service, Washington, D.C. The building is listed on the U.S. National Register of Historic Places as "U.S. Custom House". It was listed on 10 February 1988 and later on the Puerto Rico Register of Historic Sites and Zones in 2001.

== Historical background ==
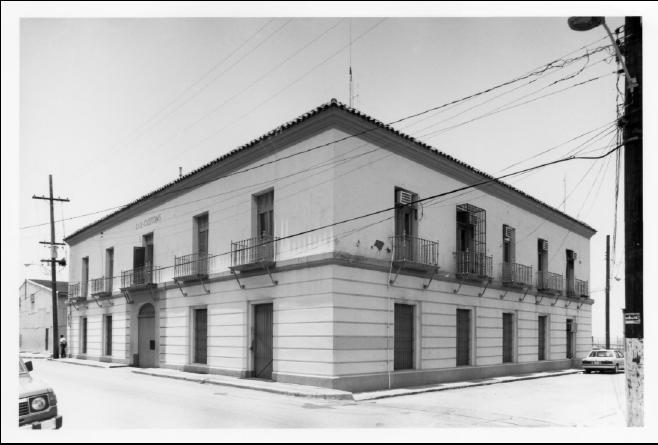
U.S Customs House in Ponce, Puerto Rico. General view, looking southeast.

The Ponce Customs House opened in 1842. At that time, customs administrative offices and warehouses were located on the first floor, while the second floor was devoted to dwelling units for the director of the customhouse and for the captain of the Port of Ponce. In 1845 the customhouse survived a terrible fire that destroyed most of the Ponce port vicinity. During the Spanish-American occupation, In 1898 General Nelson A. Miles established the headquarters of the American army in the customhouse during the Spanish–American War, from which he directed the invasion of the southern part of Puerto Rico. Salvador Brau, noted Puerto Rican historian, served as the head appraiser for the Spanish customs service in Ponce; after the American occupation, he was appointed by General Miles as Customs Administrator of Puerto Rico, a post he held for many years.

During the period of significance, Ponce was the second most populous city in Puerto Rico, with a population of about 70,000, and for most of the period, the second busiest port, after San Juan.

Following a major earthquake in 1918, the U.S. Customs Service undertook a comprehensive program of rebuilding and new construction. The remodeling may have been under the supervision of Albert B. Nichols, architect and inspector of buildings under the Supervising Architect of the Treasury's San Juan field office. A sheet of drawings, unsigned and undated, for the remodeling are in the San Juan Custom House files, and the Puerto Rico Historic Preservation Office believes that they may be Nichols' work. Three other sheets signed by Rafael Carmoega, Chief architect of the insular government and presumed to date from August 1930, exist in the Public Building Service records.

The Ponce Custom House was designated a historic customhouse by the Secretary of the Treasury in 1972. Despite its 1924 remodeling, it remains an important example of Spanish Colonial architecture outside Old San Juan.

== Significance ==
This United States Custom House in Ponce is the oldest extant customhouse in Puerto Rico. Built in 1841–42, the adobe building of the Spanish era was remodeled by the United States in 1924. It is historically and architecturally significant for its antiquity and its importance in the Spanish period of customs administration in Puerto Rico, as it is the only one of its type among U.S. Customs Service properties. It is also significant for the role it played in the transitional phase of the American customs service in Puerto Rico, from 1898 to 1930. This period is bracketed at one end by the cession on 10 December 1898 of the island of Puerto Rico to the United States by Spain and on the other end by the completion in 1930 of the major building and rehabilitation program undertaken by the U.S. Customs Service following World War I. The Ponce Custom House is an important example of the Spanish-Colonial architecture outside of Old San Juan.

== Building Description ==
The building is a Spanish-period building which was remodeled by the United States in 1924, with small changes since then. The two-story building has massive masonry walls and large arched entrances to a central courtyard that reflects its Spanish origins, while the false partial gables with Spanish barrel tiles are typical of the United States Spanish Revival architectural work of the 1920s. The building is situated on the waterfront facing the Caribbean Sea and next to the port of Ponce, two miles from the center of this second-largest city in Puerto Rico. The customs house fully occupies a small city block. Its principal facade faces Bonaire Street and looks toward the ocean across a grassed area containing a Coast Guard beacon. It is located in an area of traditional warehouses, commercial buildings, mostly one-story and many from the Spanish period. There is a sidewalk around the four sides of the building, with the one on Bonaire Street wider and providing three mature trees.

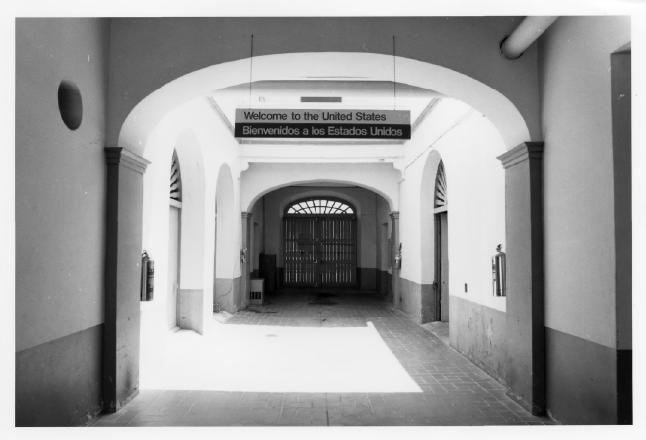
U.S Customs House in Ponce, Puerto Rico. Passage and courtyard, looking north.

The building is a simple rectangle measuring 97 ft (30 m) by 83 ft (25 m). The plan is typical of Spanish construction, with interconnected rooms, around the outside perimeter that also open to a central courtyard. There is a wide arched vehicular passage leading from the front through the courtyard to the rear exit from the building. The original courtyard has been partially closed in on the first floor only on each side of the passageway to create two additional rooms. Between the front rooms and the courtyard, a fine masonry staircase rises on the left side off the central passage. The second floor repeats the first-floor layout of perimeter rooms with later modifications, but includes the full extent of the original courtyard or patio in the center. Originally there may have been a roofed courtyard gallery for circulation around the courtyard. At present, there are two short modern gallery sections bridging between the quarry-tile-paved roofs of the infilled first-floor courtyard areas. At the head of the stairs is a large public lobby that opens to the courtyard and to the front of the building. There is also a small circular iron stair to the roof from the southeast corner of the second-floor courtyard.

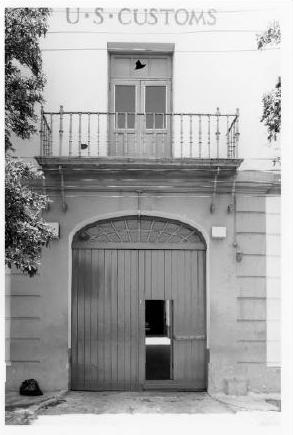
U.S Customs House in Ponce, Puerto Rico. Main entrance, looking north.

The facades are similar with regular door and window openings and with small balconies to the second-floor openings. There is a small partial false gable roof of Spanish barrel red-clay tiles around the four sides and around the courtyard. On the front (south) facade, facing the ocean, there are five bays with a large elliptical arch-headed passageway large enough for vehicular traffic. It is architecturally marked only by a plain, flat frame painted differently from the body of the building. There are plain board, double doors with a smaller pedestrian port in the right door. In the elliptical arch there is a simple fanlight window. Flanking the arched entrance are two large high windows on each side. The windows are two-leaf casements with exterior solid and louvered combination paneled shutters. Metal grilles are at each window. The walls have a simple low projecting base course, and the first floor walls are marked by horizontal incised coursing, all in stucco. There is a large molded string course between stories and on the second floor, five door openings, each with double-leaf doors that are half sash, which replaced the original louvered and paneled shutter combinations. Over the doors are sashed transoms, although the right group has been replaced by air conditioners. Each opening has a decorative wrought iron balcony with scroll support dating from the U.S. remodeling of the building. Previous to these wrought-iron balconies, the building had cast iron railings. "U.S. Customs" is lettered over the central window. At the top is a large double masonry molded cornice, surmounted by the small false partial gable in Spanish tiles, both from 1924. On the front only, there are three flag poles on the roof, and a large antenna system. On each side of the first floor passage entry is an alarm box and a plain light fixture.

The rear facade is identical to the front, except that the right first-floor opening is a plain board door rather than a window and that some of the second-floor doors still retain their original louvered and paneled shutter systems and have not had glass inserted.

The side facades are similar to the front and rear, except for the absence of the arched passageway. Both sides are in five bays, all windows, on the first floor, with the exception of a door on the east side. The second-floor openings and balconies match the front with air conditioners generally mounted in the transoms. On the west side one second-floor door has a modern boxed-out bar grille around it.

Construction of the original 1841–42 building is in traditional heavy masonry walls two feet thick. The ceilings are high: 15' on the first floor, 14' on the second. There are several large structural arch openings in the interior masonry walls. The exposed floor joists are heavy 4x10 beaded edge ausubo wood members laid 24" on center. These old joists support modern concrete slab second floor laid over wire mesh and composition board forms laid during the 20th century remodeling. Also added at this point was reinforced concrete framing adjoining the old walls on the first floor. It is now in deteriorated condition, while the original walls appear generally sound.

In the interior, the central passage extends from front to rear through the open courtyard, paved in quarry tiles. On the left side at the front of the building, are two Immigration and Naturalization Service offices. On the right front are two U.S. Department of Agriculture offices. Behind the offices on the left side of the passage is a fine enclosed stair with two runs and a landing. The remaining first-floor rooms are storage rooms and a shop with concrete floors, several 8' wide masonry openings with slat fanlights (sol truncos). Storage room windows are solid vertical board shutters without sash and with outside metal grilles. Two rooms flanking the passage in the center fill in an original part of the courtyard in a manner similar to the older construction.

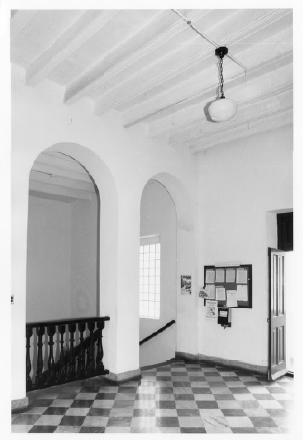
U.S Customs House in Ponce, Puerto Rico. Second floor stair hall and stair arcade, looking northwest.

On the second floor, the staircase from the entry passage opens on a large lobby from a two-arched staircase arcade. The lobby extends from the front back to the courtyard and is floored with diagonally laid gray and white marble tiles. The walls, as are old walls in the building, are plastered, and the ceiling has exposed 4x10 beaded ausubo wood beams. Old double four-paneled doors and a transom open to the courtyard. The window in the stairhall has been filled in with glass brick.

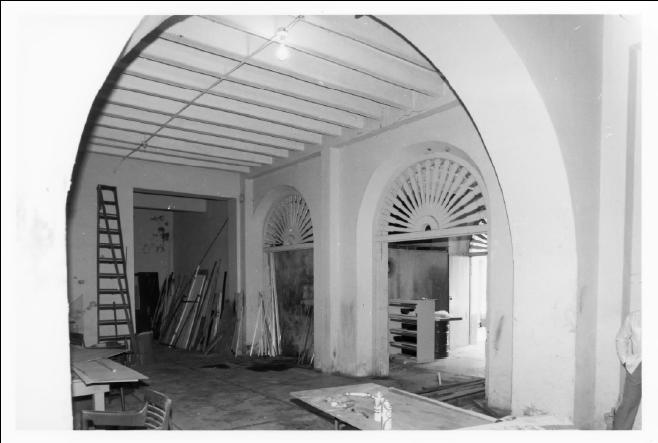
U.S Customs House in Ponce, Puerto Rico. First floor, east side, store room, looking southwest.

The offices on the second floor generally have been modernized with acoustical tile ceilings, fluorescent fixtures and vinyl floors. The old exterior doors remain, generally with glass replacing the shuttered sections, except for several windows on the rear lavatories and kitchen. Air conditioners are mounted in the transoms over the doors. On the southeast corner is a large inspector's office, with a counter for public business. Some old masonry partitions had been removed or altered to create this space. Along the east side, small rooms have been partitioned off and in the rear northeast corner is the large Port Director's office, in its original configuration. Across the north rear are a men's lavatory, a women's lavatory and a kitchen, all with black and white floor tiles. The kitchen appears to be original to the building and has traces of the original masonry cooking stove and flue. The left rear north corner room now used for training is also floored in old black and white tiles.

In the San Juan customs house files, there is one large sheet of remodeling plans for the Ponce Customs house, possibly by Albert B. Nichols, although not signed. In 1985 Customs Service commissioned a set of fifteen measured drawings by architect Rene Acosta, Hato Rey, P. R. which are reproduced in a report by the architect on the rehabilitation needs of the Ponce Custom House. (Feasibility Study for the Rehabilitation of the U.S. Ponce Custom House, Ponce, P. R.)

== See also ==
- United States Customs House (Fajardo, Puerto Rico)
- U.S. Custom House (Mayaguez, Puerto Rico)

== Resources ==
- "James C. Massey, Exec. Vice Pres., and Shirley Maxwell, Associate, National Preservation Institute (National Building Museum) Washington, D.C. and the Federal Historic Preservation Office, U.S. Department of the Treasury. (Washington D.C.) 7 January 1988. In National Register of Historic Places Registration Form - U.S. Custom House, Ponce. United States Department of the Interior. National Park Service. (Washington, D.C.) Listing Reference Number 88000073. 10 February 1988".
