= Eames & Young =

Former American architecture firm

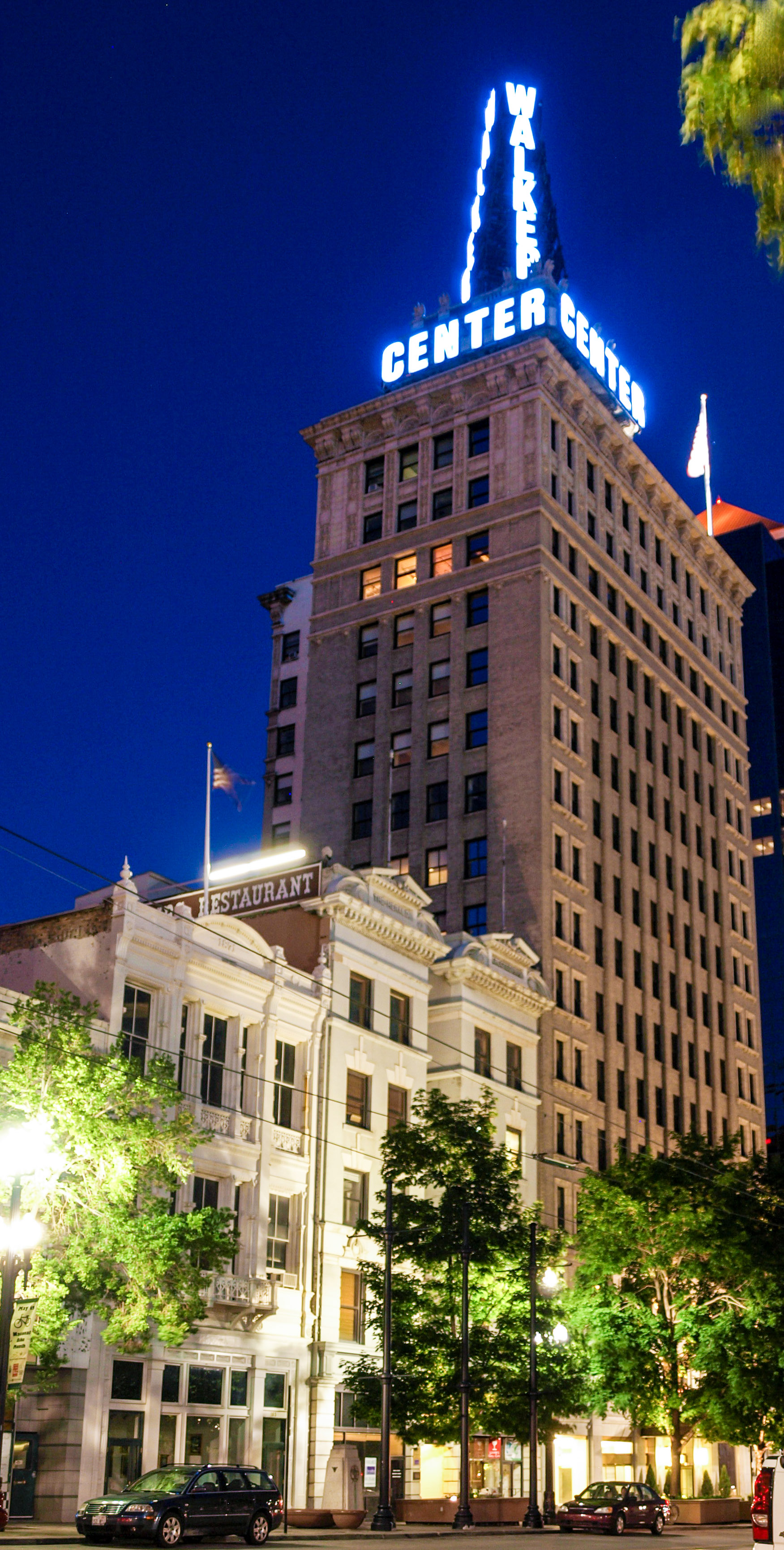
Walker Center, Salt Lake City, Utah, 1912

Eames and Young was an American architecture firm based in St. Louis, Missouri, active nationally, and responsible for several buildings on the National Register of Historic Places. It was led by Thomas Crane Young and William Sylvester Eames.

== History ==
The principals were Thomas Crane Young, FAIA and William Sylvester Eames, FAIA. Young was born in Sheboygan, Wisconsin, and came to St. Louis to attend Washington University, then spent two years at the Ecole des Beaux Arts in 1880, and briefly worked for the Boston firm of Van Brunt & Howe. Eames had come to St. Louis as a child, attended the St. Louis School of Fine Arts, and served as Deputy Commissioner of Public Buildings for the city.

They formed a partnership in 1885. Their first works were elaborate mansions for Vandeventer Place and other private places in St. Louis, which led to an important series of landmark downtown warehouses, later collectively known as Cupples Station. Eames was elected president of the American Institute of Architects in 1904–05. Through the 1900s and 1910s, the firm designed several St. Louis skyscrapers and built a reputation for offices, schools, and institutional buildings constructed nationwide.

Eames died in 1915. Young's last building was the colossal 1926 St. Louis Masonic Temple on Lindell, and he quit practice in 1927. Their papers are held by the Art and Architecture Library at Washington University Libraries.

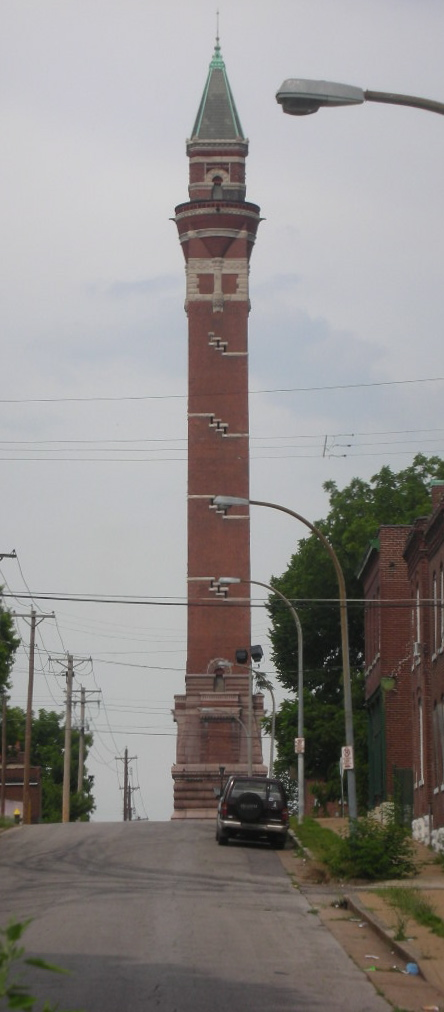
Bissell Street Water Tower, St. Louis 1887

William S. Eames never married but was survived by his brother Charles Eames Sr. (Who was the father of the famous mid century modern designer/architect Charles Eames) and five sisters. Thomas Crane Young continued to work and eventually formed an office with Alfred H. Granger in Chicago 1917.

(Source Washington University who holds hundreds of photos from Eames and Young https://library.washu.edu/spec/eames-young/)

== Work ==
- Cupples Stations Warehouses, St. Louis, 1892-1915
- Lindell Pavilion, Forest Park, St. Louis, 1892
- United States Penitentiary, Leavenworth, Kansas, 1895
- Mississippi Valley Trust (now Schupp Building), St. Louis, 1896
- United States Penitentiary, Atlanta, Georgia, 1902
- Frisco Building, St. Louis, Missouri, 1903–04
- Palace of Education, Louisiana Purchase Exposition, St. Louis, 1904 (razed)
- The Alaska Building, the first steel-frame high-rise in Seattle, Washington, 1904
- Wright Building, St. Louis, 1906 (later joined to the Arcade Building in 1919)
- Ely Walker Lofts, St. Louis, 1907
- The Josephinum, Seattle, Washington, 1908
- The Hotchkiss Chapel, Bellefontaine Cemetery, St. Louis, Missouri 1909
- Corby–Forsee Building, St. Joseph, Missouri, 1910
- United States Customs House, San Francisco, California, circa 1911
- Walker Center, aka the Walker Bank Building, Salt Lake City, Utah, 1912
- Marquette Building (St. Louis), aka the Boatmen's Bank Building, 1914
- Masonic Temple, St. Louis, with Albert B. Groves as associate, 1926
