= Gene Snyder United States Courthouse =

- United States Post Office, Court House and Custom House
- U.S. National Register of Historic Places
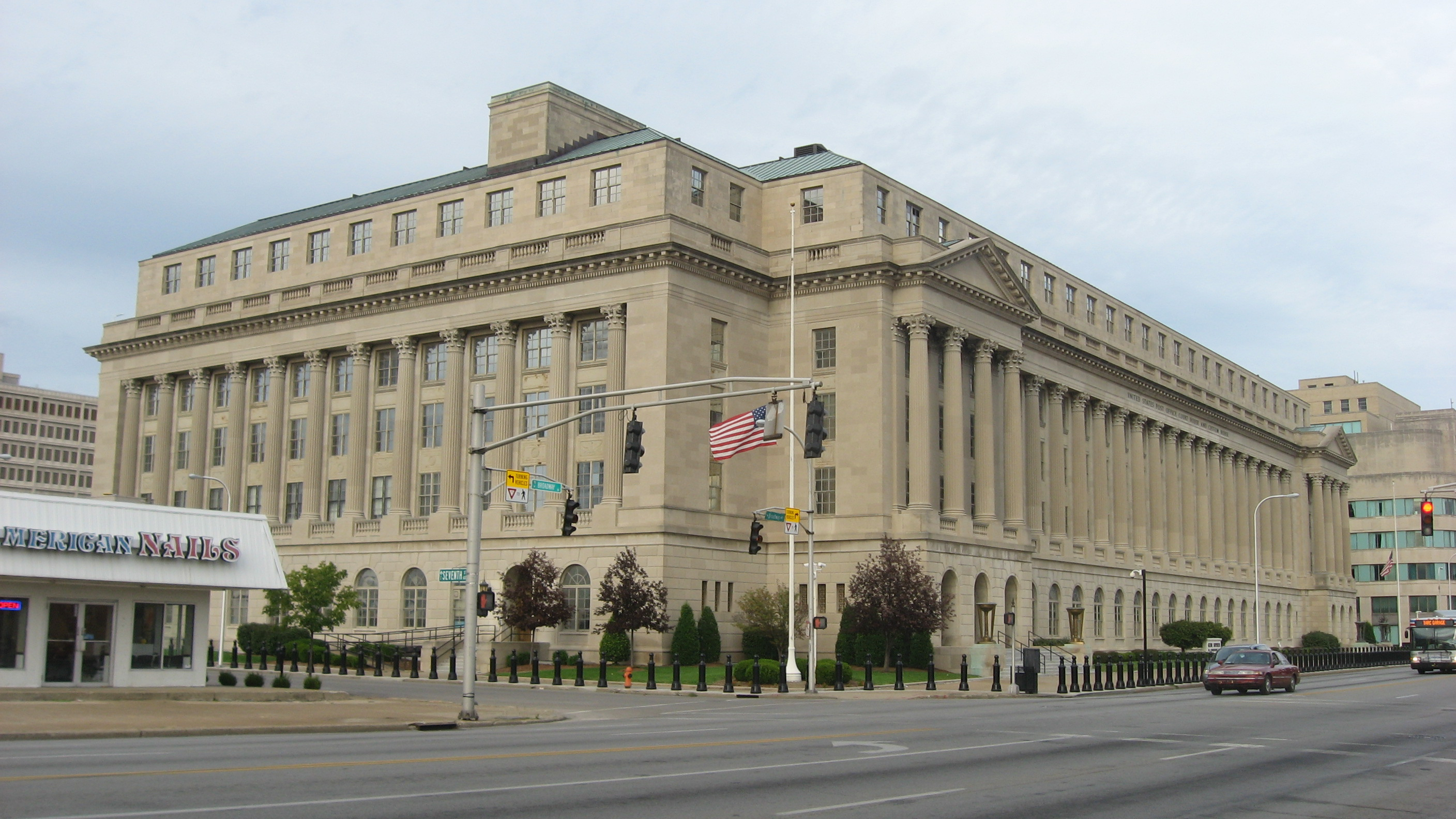
- View from the southwest

- Location within Kentucky Location within the United States
- Location: 601 W. Broadway, Louisville, Kentucky
- Coordinates: 38°14′51″N 85°45′45″W
- Built: 1931-32; 1936
- Architect: James A. Wetmore; Fike and Cook Co.
- Architectural style: Classical Revival
- NRHP reference No.: 99000334
- Added to NRHP: March 18, 1999

The Gene Snyder U.S. Courthouse and Custom House, also known as United States Post Office, Court House and Custom House, is a historic courthouse, custom house, and post office located at Louisville in Jefferson County, Kentucky. It is the courthouse for the United States District Court for the Western District of Kentucky. It is listed on the National Register of Historic Places under the "United States Post Office, Court House and Custom House" name.

== Building history ==
Construction of the Post Office, Court House and Custom House, as it was known historically, came at the end of a prosperous decade for the city of Louisville. The largest city in Kentucky, Louisville played a major role in the regional manufacturing and shipping industries, fostering an increasing population and urban development. New building projects highlighted the city's growth and prosperity, and the planned construction of the new federal building was another indication of Louisville's rising prominence. The new federal building was constructed from 1931 to 1932, under the Supervising Architect of the U.S. Treasury Department James A. Wetmore.

The building was among the first recipients of artwork commissioned by the Treasury Relief Art Project, that employed painters and sculptors to incorporate art within the interiors of federal buildings nationwide. In 1935, artist Frank Weathers Long, a Kentucky native, was commissioned to paint ten murals depicting regional themes of commerce, agriculture, and sport. In 1936, with a growing need for more offices and courtrooms, the PWA funded the addition of the sixth floor. The interior of the building was renovated in 1950. In 1958, the sixth story was damaged by a fire, prompting additional renovations.

In 1986, the building was renamed in honor of Marion Gene Snyder. Born in Louisville in 1928, Snyder was a prominent figure in Kentucky politics, serving several public offices, including U.S. Congressional Representative from 1963 to 1965 and 1967 to 1987.

In 1986, the Post Office moved out, and Congress appropriated funds for a four-year renovation project to modernize the interiors and restore the key historic spaces on the first and second floors. As a result of the project, the building received numerous stewardship awards, including the 1997/98 and 1998/99 Office Building of the Year, Historic Building Category from the Building Owners and Managers Association (BOMA); BOMA's 1999/2000 International Award for Government Building of the Year, Historic Building Category; and the 2001 Modernization Project award from Buildings Magazine. In 1999, the Gene Snyder U.S. Courthouse and Custom House was listed in the National Register of Historic Places.

== Architecture ==
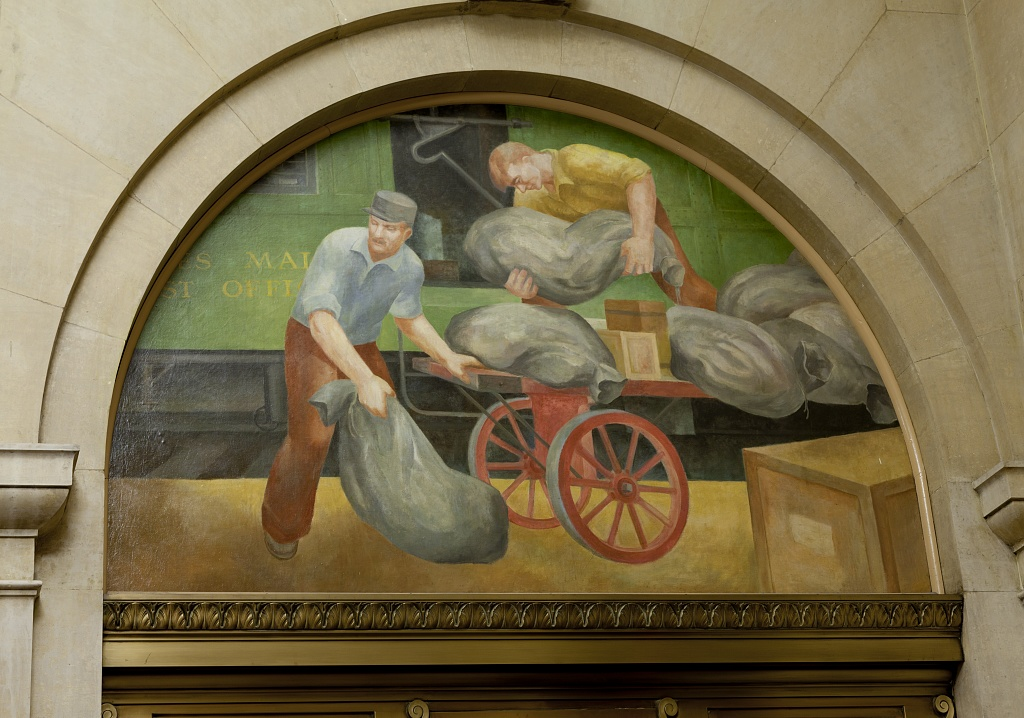
A mural inside the building, titled "Post Office Rail Car"

An American Classic: Gene Snyder U.S. Courthouse and Custom House, Louisville, Kentucky

The Gene Snyder U.S. Courthouse and Custom House is an excellent example of Classical Revival architecture, a style that federal government architects embraced during the early twentieth century as a method of symbolizing democratic ideals of government and power. More specifically, the building was inspired by the architecture of the U.S. Treasury Department Building in Washington, DC, designed a century earlier. Both buildings prominently feature a limestone facade composed of a long colonnade of tall, colossal columns raised on a ground-story base to an imposing and impressive effect. Unlike the Treasury Building, the Courthouse was constructed not of solid masonry, but of modern materials, including concrete and steel columns and beams, with Bedford limestone for the exterior veneer.

Encompassing an entire city block, the rectangular building rises six stories (the fifth floor is concealed on the exterior behind the limestone entablature). The facade (south elevation) facing Broadway features a row of 18 engaged Corinthian columns with fluted shafts poised upon a rusticated base of arched windows aligned with the fenestration above. The colonnade is framed at each end by projecting pavilions, each with four columns and crowning pediments. The secondary east and west elevations are composed of 12 colossal Corinthian columns to match those of the facade.

A continuous limestone entablature, composed of an architrave, frieze, dentil molding, and cornice, and a balustraded parapet cap the south, east, and west elevations. Above this, the unadorned smooth stone walls of the sixth story are subordinate to the articulated rhythm of the lower stories. The two primary entrances are recessed within the tripartite arches at the ends of the facade, and are accessed by stairs flanked by original bronze and glass light standards with claw feet and fluted columns. The glass and bronze doors are original, and retain their decorative surrounds and elliptical transoms containing bronze grilles.

The building's interior is primarily composed of individual offices connected by central corridors, with the exception of the main lobby on the first floor. Originally designed to provide space for post office patrons, the lobby is a grand space, with an arcade extending the length of the building. The lobby is finely detailed with original pink, green, and beige marble flooring with geometric insets, marble veneer for the walls and pilasters, and a pair of marble Doric order columns at each end. Paintings by Frank Weathers Long embellish the lobby walls, with murals titled Stock Farming and Agriculture in the east lobby and Ohio River Traffic and Coal Mining in the west lobby.

The two main stairwells feature marble staircases with wrought-iron balusters and floral designs inset into wood handrails. Adjacent elevators retain their original bronze doors, displaying decorative medallions and Greek fretwork. Above the elevator doors are bronze acanthus-leaf moldings and lunettes with murals depicting postal delivery themes, also painted by Long.

The second floor includes two original federal courtrooms designed with coffered wood ceilings, marble wainscoting, decorative pilasters, and arched windows.

The law library features elegant details including Doric fluted, wood pilasters and an original plaster ceiling decorated with Greek fret band and wave molding.

From 1986 to 1990, GSA launched an extensive renovation project. The office spaces were remodeled with modern amenities and contemporary interior design, including new floor and wall finishes. At the same time, original finishes and fixtures in the historic courtrooms and lobbies were rehabilitated and restored to their 1932 condition.

== See also ==
- List of United States post offices
- United States Post Office, Court House, and Custom House (Louisville, Kentucky, 1893)
