= Graves Public Library =

- U.S. Customhouse
- U.S. National Register of Historic Places
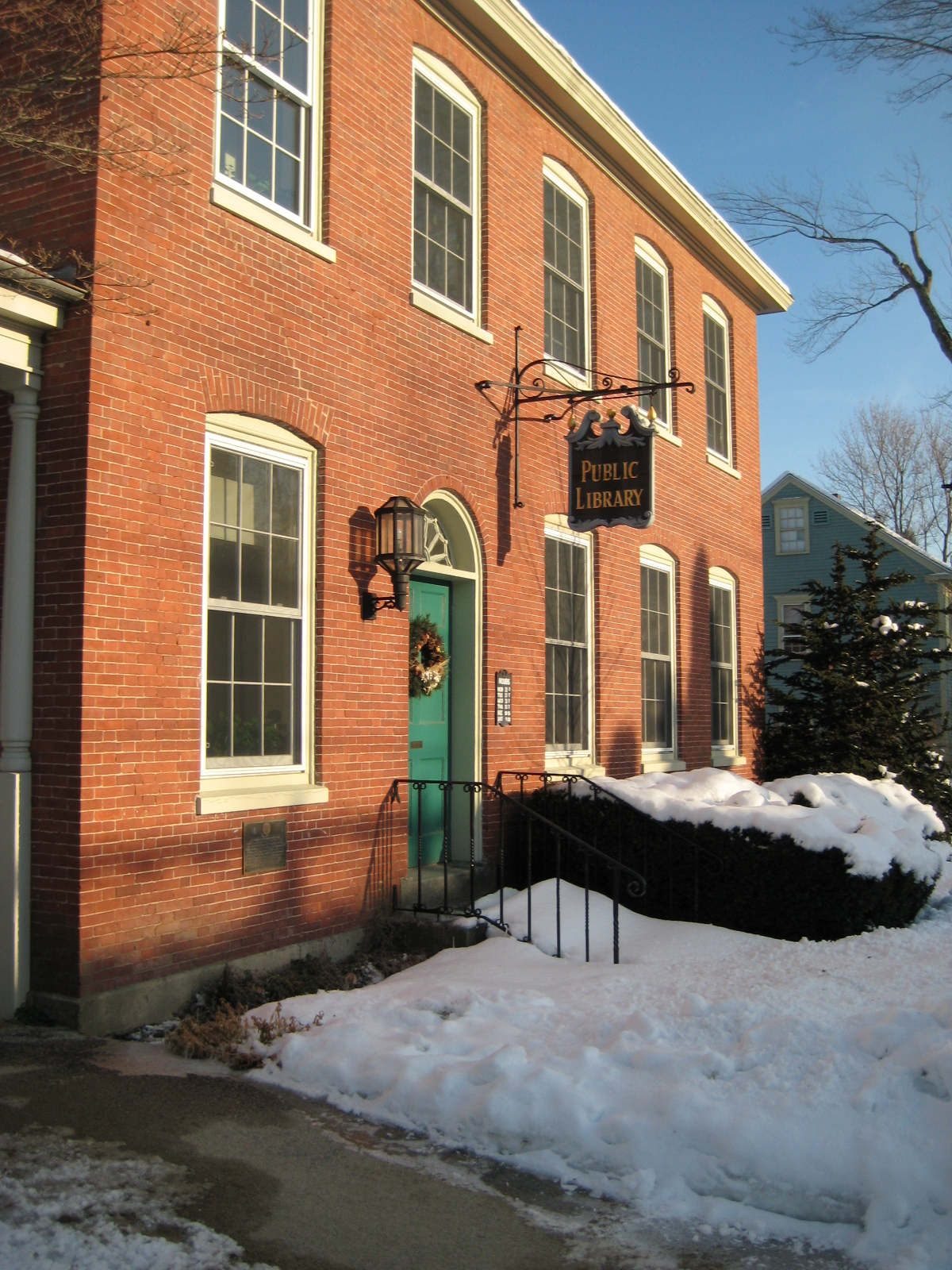

- Location within Maine Location within the United States
- Location: 18 Maine Street, Kennebunkport, Maine
- Coordinates: 43°21′42″N 70°28′32″W
- Area: 1 acre (0.40 ha)
- Built: 1815
- Architectural style: Federal
- NRHP reference No.: 74000323
- Added to NRHP: January 18, 1974

The Louis T. Graves Memorial Public Library is the public library of Kennebunkport, Maine. It is located at 18 Maine Street, in a handsome brick Federal style building that served as the U.S. Customhouse from 1815 until 1913. The building was listed on the National Register of Historic Places on January 18, 1974.

== Architecture and history ==
The Graves Library is located on the east side of Maine Street (Maine State Route 9) in the center of Kennebunkport. It is a two-story brick building, with a hip roof and granite foundation. Its front facade, facing west, is five bays wide, with windows set in segmented-arch openings, and the entrance located asymmetrically in the second bay from the left, in a round-arch opening with a half-round transom. The interior of the building retains Federal period fixtures and trim.

The building was erected between 1813 and 1815 by the Kennebunk Bank of Arundel, which operated on its first floor. The second floor was taken up by the local customs offices, whose jurisdiction covered the ports of Kennebunkport, Kennebunk and Wells. The building was purchased by the federal government in 1832, at which time the entire building was occupied by the customs offices. It continued to serve in this capacity until 1913, when the customs district was merged into that of Portland.

The Kennebunkport Library Association was formed in 1916, and rented space in the building that same year. The building was bought from the government by Mr. and Mrs. Abbot Graves. They gave the property to the association in 1921, on condition it be named for their son, Louis T. Graves. The Library was expanded in 1950 and 1988. In 2017, 5,500 square feet was added to include a business center, book sale, kitchen, community room, and an elevator.

== See also ==
- National Register of Historic Places listings in York County, Maine
