= United States Customhouse (San Francisco) =

- U.S. Customhouse
- U.S. National Register of Historic Places
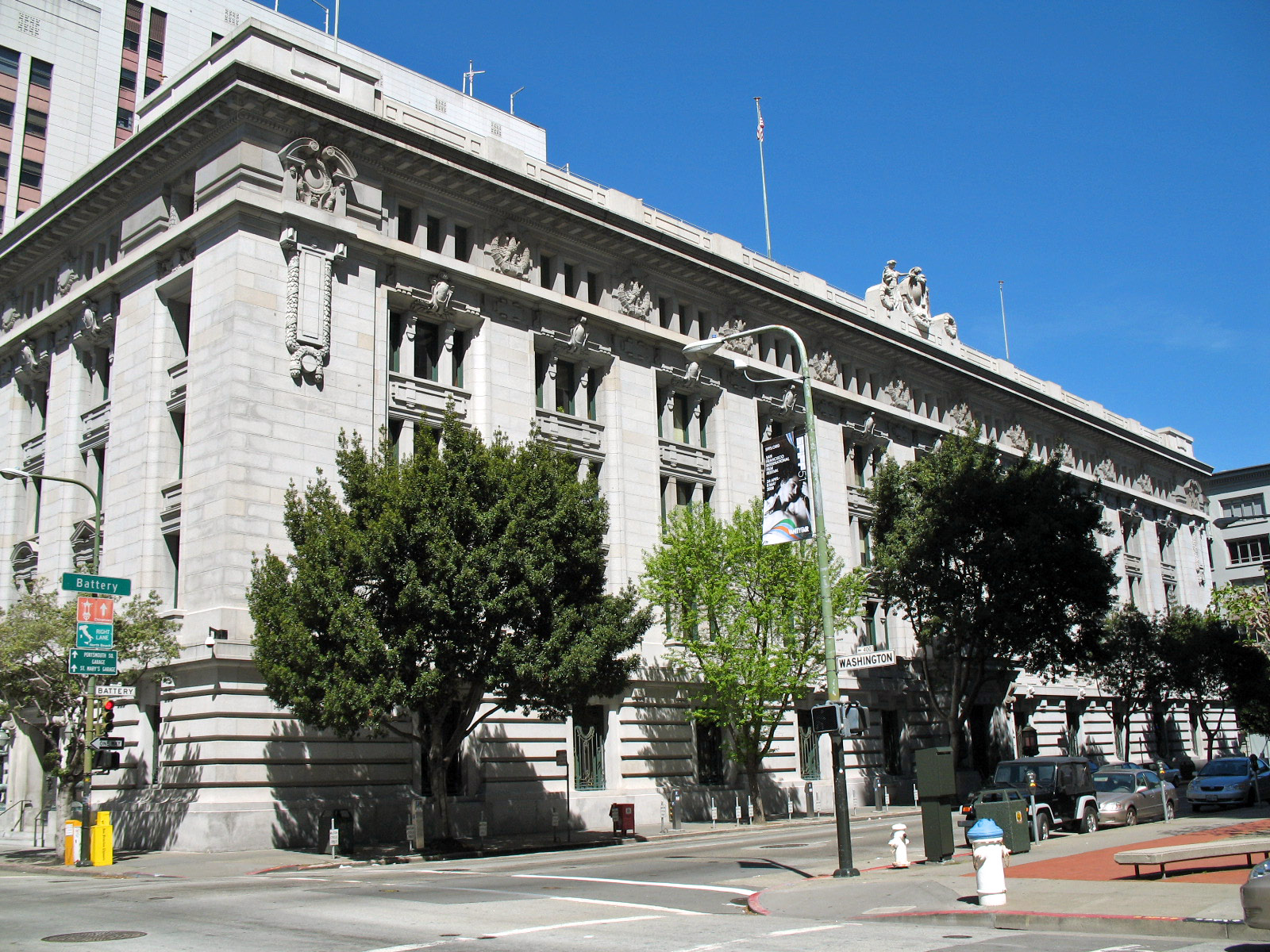
- U.S. Customhouse, April 2008

- Location within San Francisco County Location within California Location within the United States
- Location: 555 Battery St., San Francisco, California
- Coordinates: 37.79631°N 122.400937°W
- Area: 1.7 acres (0.69 ha)
- Built: 1911
- Architect: Eames & Young
- Architectural style: Late 19th And 20th Century Revivals
- NRHP reference No.: 75000476
- Added to NRHP: January 29, 1975

The U.S. Customhouse is a historic custom house located in San Francisco, California. It was built to house offices of the United States Customs Service.

== Previous custom houses ==
The acquisition of the natural harbor of San Francisco Bay as a result of the US-Mexico War and the subsequent admission of California into the Union, plus the extraordinary boom resulting from the Gold Rush, and also the highly anticipated trade with Asia, together dictated the necessity for a custom house in San Francisco. The first custom house was established in an existing adobe building on Portsmouth Square in 1850. It was moved to a four-story brick structure constructed in June 1850, located at Montgomery and California Streets. Despite being made of brick, this structure succumbed to the Great Fire of 1851. The custom service was then temporarily relocated to the corner of Washington and Kearney Streets. In 1853, work began on a new custom house located on Battery Street between Jackson and Montgomery Streets. It opened in 1854, and remained in service for some six decades before being demolished in November 1905 to make way for the construction of the current structure.

== Construction of the present custom house ==
In 1905, Eames & Young, a St. Louis architectural firm won a national design competition (juried by architect Thomas Rogers Kimball) for a new custom house. The firm was chosen under the auspices of the Tarsney Act (1890–1912), which allowed the Treasury Department to hire private architects rather than use only government designers. William S. Eames and Thomas C. Young were the firm's principals. They designed the building in the Beaux Arts Classicism style, which was popular as part of the City Beautiful movement that sought to create more appealing urban centers.

Ground was broken for the new custom house on January 28, 1906. Three months later, a devastating earthquake and subsequent fire decimated San Francisco. Because much of the city was being rebuilt simultaneously, there were severe labor and material shortages. As a result, construction of the custom house was not completed until 1911.

The U.S. Custom House was listed in the National Register of Historic Places in 1975. After the 1989 Loma Prieta earthquake, seismic and other upgrades were made from 1993 to 1997. While the building continues to serve many of its original purposes, the U.S. Customs Service is now the U.S. Customs and Border Protection, part of the Department of Homeland Security.

== Architecture ==
The U.S. Custom House is an excellent example of the Beaux Arts Classicism style of architecture, which is characterized by classical yet exuberant details. Many important federal buildings were designed in this style during the late 19th century and early 20th century. Some elements of Beaux Arts Classicism that are found on the U.S. Custom House include a symmetrical facade and articulated entrances that are highlighted with granite entablatures and carvings. The main entrance on Battery Street has a grouping of sculptural figures over the cornice.

The imposing six-story building is faced in pale granite from Raymond, California. The concrete foundation of the building rests on timbers from the hull of the steamship Georgian, a vessel from San Francisco's gold rush days that was abandoned. The building essentially has a U-shaped plan that surrounds an oval, two-story pavilion that contains the post office and Custom Hall.

Like many buildings with Beaux Arts Classicism features, the facade is divided into three horizontal zones. The lower zone is a rusticated granite base with deeply recessed joints that extends across the first story. The middle zone is characterized by smooth granite with windows topped with pediments and cartouches (decorative ovals). The upper zone is a recessed fifth story, where stylized eagle motifs separate the windows, and parapet.

The interior of the U.S. Custom House contains a variety of high-quality finishes. Oak parquet floors are set in a herringbone pattern. Walls are paneled in oak with applied carved ornaments and inset with panels of green leather and decorated canvas. Other floors and walls are covered with marble. Ceilings are decorated with elaborate molded and painted plaster. The central lobby contains marble stairs and flooring, and a high ceiling with decorative plaster work.

The monumental Custom Hall originally functioned as the most important operational and public space. The rich finishes include a marble floor and applied plaster ornamentation such as pilasters (attached columns). The walls and vaulted ceiling of the Custom Hall are finished with plaster and painted with a vibrant color scheme. Three historic skylights were restored to their original appearance as part of a renovation and restoration in 1997. Large, arched windows dominate the space. The curved end walls of the room incorporate two large murals painted in 1915 by Abraham Lincoln Cooper, who also painted murals at the U.S. Courthouse and Post Office in Columbus, Ohio. Building the Panama Canal commemorates the completion of the canal in 1915, and Allegory of San Francisco is a representation of the port city. The paintings were restored in 1938 and 1971.

Another significant interior space is the Port Director's Office on the third floor. Originally used as an office suite by the Collector of Customs, the rooms have undergone only minor changes. Walls are paneled in oak with an ornamental frieze and a patterned cornice. The rooms contain stained oak parquet floors and a marble fireplace. The office was used as a set in the movie The Right Stuff in 1983.

The U.S. Custom House retains a high degree of architectural integrity. Relatively few changes have been made to the building since its construction. In 1997, a renovation that increased seismic resistance and upgraded electrical, plumbing, and data systems while preserving the historic character of the building was completed. Original historic finishes were restored as part of the project.

== Significant events ==
- 1905: Design competition won by Eames & Young
- 1906: Ground broken for construction great earthquake and fire destroy much of San Francisco
- 1911: Construction completed
- 1975: U.S. Custom House listed in the National Register of Historic Places
- 1989: Loma Prieta earthquake
- 1997: Renovation completed

== Building facts ==
- Location: 555 Battery Street
- Architect: Eames & Young
- Construction dates: 1906–1911
- Landmark Status: Listed in the National Register of Historic Places
- Architectural Style: Beaux Arts Classicism
- Primary Material: Granite
- Prominent Features: Classical Facade; Custom Hall; Port Director's Office
