= Old United States Customshouse and Post Office and Fireproof Storage Company Warehouse =

- Old U.S. Customshouse and Post Office and Fireproof Storage Company Warehouse
- U.S. National Register of Historic Places
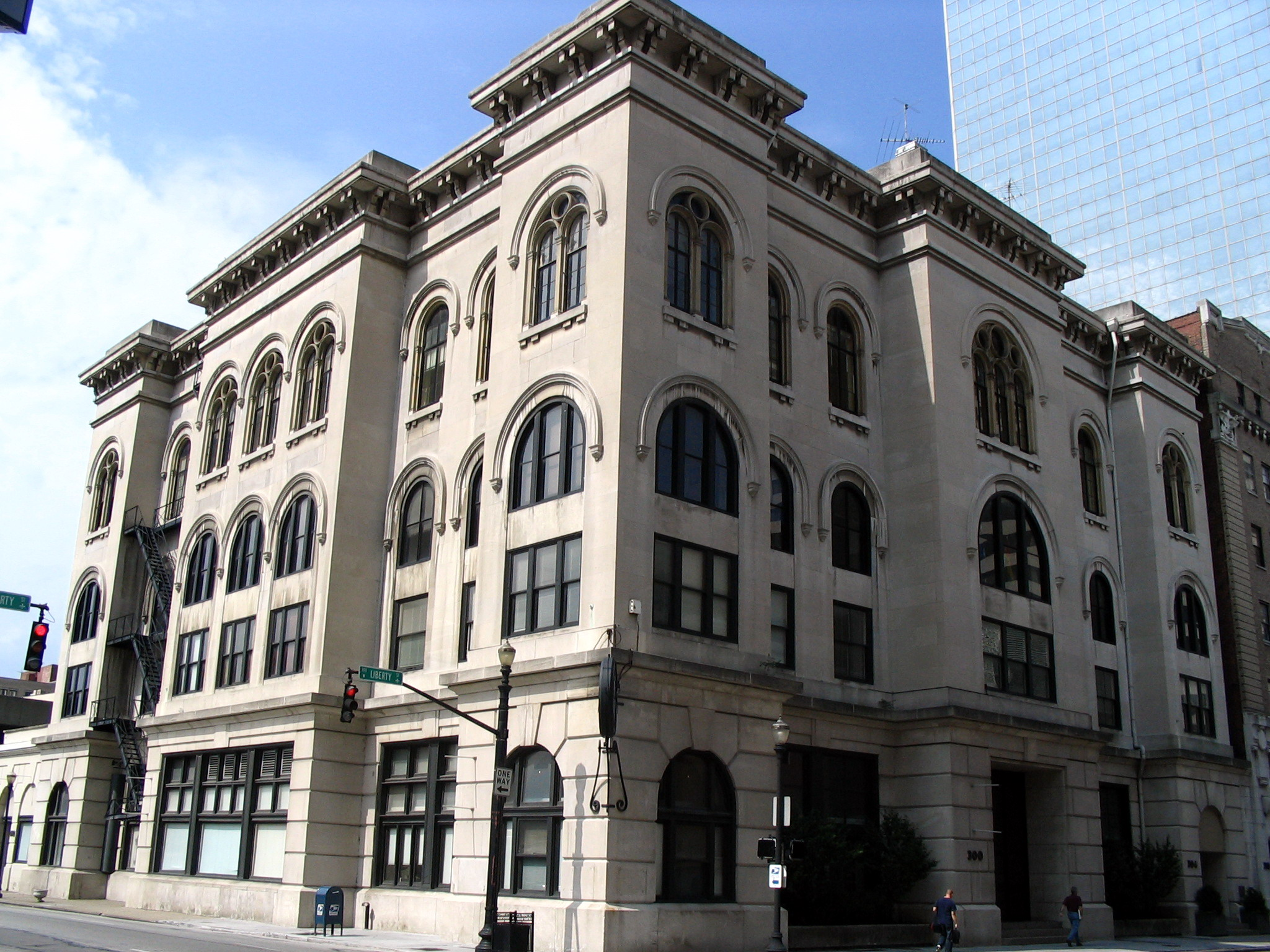
- Southeastern angle

- Location within Kentucky Location within the United States
- Location: 300 W. Liberty St. (original); 300-314 W. Liberty St. (increased); Louisville, Kentucky
- Coordinates: 38°15′9″N 85°45′21″W
- Area: 0.5 acres (0.20 ha) (original) less than one acre (increase)
- Built: 1853 (original); 1907 (increase)
- Architect: Arthur Loomis (increase)
- Architectural style: Beaux Arts (increase)
- NRHP reference No.: 77000626 (original); 80001612 (increase)
- Added to NRHP: November 23, 1977 (original); May 31, 1980 (increase)

The Old U.S. Customshouse and Post Office at 300 West Liberty Street in Louisville, Kentucky was built in 1853. It served historically as a federal district court, custom house, and post office. It was listed on the National Register of Historic Places in 1977.

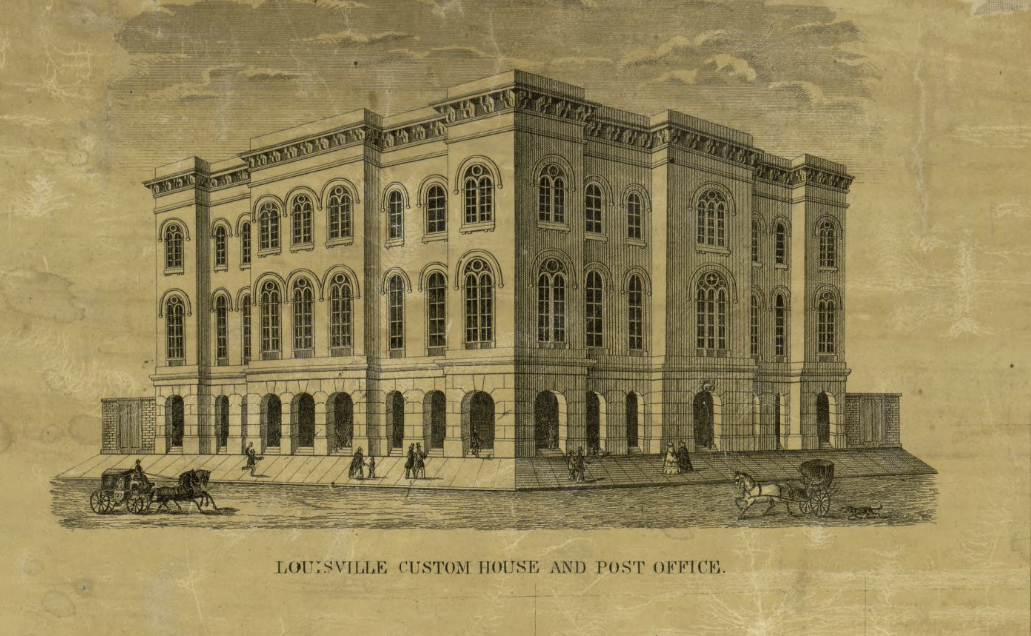
G. T. Bergmann Korff Brothers map 1858

== Warehouse ==
The Fireproof Storage Company Warehouse is a 1907 Beaux Arts style warehouse designed by Arthur Loomis. It is also known as the Chamber of Commerce Building and as the 310 Building.

The National Register listing was expanded in 1980 to include the warehouse. The combined listing, Old U.S. Customshouse and Post Office and Fireproof Storage Company Warehouse, covers 300-314 West Liberty Street.

== See also ==
- List of United States post offices
- United States Post Office, Court House, and Custom House (Louisville, Kentucky, 1893)
