= List of United States federal courthouses in Montana =

This is a list of current and former courthouses of the United States federal court system located in Montana. Each entry indicates the name of the building along with an image, if available, its location and the jurisdiction it covers, the dates during which it was used for each such jurisdiction, and, if applicable the person for whom it was named, and the date of renaming. Dates of use will not necessarily correspond with the dates of construction or demolition of a building, as pre-existing structures may be adapted or court use, and former court buildings may later be put to other uses. Also, the official name of the building may be changed at some point after its use as a federal court building has been initiated.

== Courthouses ==
Courthouse	City	Image	Street address	Jurisdiction	Dates of use	Named for
U.S. Post Office and Courthouse^{†}	Billings		2602 1st Avenue North	D.Mont	1914–?	n/a
James F. Battin Federal Building^{†}	Billings		316 North 26th Street	D.Mont	1963–2012	U.S. Rep. and District Court judge James F. Battin
James F. Battin Federal Courthouse	Billings		2601 2nd Avenue North	D.Mont	2012–present	U.S. Rep. and District Court judge James F. Battin (H.R. 158, 1996)
Mike Mansfield Federal Bldg & U.S. Courthouse†	Butte		400 North Main Street	D.Mont	1904–present	U.S. Sen. Mike Mansfield (2002)
U.S. Post Office†	Glasgow		605 2nd Avenue South	D.Mont	1939–? Still in use as a post office.	n/a
U.S. Post Office and Courthouse†	Great Falls		215 1st Avenue North	D.Mont	1912–2009; Still in use as a Post Office	n/a
Missouri River Courthouse	Great Falls		125 Central Avenue West	D.Mont	2009–present	Location; adjacent to the Missouri River
U.S. Post Office†	Havre		306 3rd Avenue	D.Mont	1932–?	n/a
Federal Building and United States Post Office	Helena		316 N. Park Avenue	D.Mont	1904–1970s Renamed City-County Building, still in use by the city and county governments.	n/a
Federal Building	Helena		301 S. Park Avenue	D.Mont	1970s–2002 Renamed Park Avenue Building, still in use by the State of Montana.	n/a
Paul G. Hatfield Courthouse	Helena		901 Front Street	D.Mont	2002–present	U.S. Senator and District Court judge Paul G. Hatfield
Federal Building, U.S. Post Office and Courthouse†	Missoula		200 East Broadway	D.Mont	1929–1974; Constructed in 1913. Still in use by various government agencies	n/a
Russell Smith Courthouse	Missoula		201 East Broadway	D.Mont	?–present	U.S. District Court judge Russell Evans Smith

== Key ==
^{†}	Listed on the National Register of Historic Places (NRHP)
^{††}	NRHP-listed and also designated as a National Historic Landmark
