= List of United States post offices in Montana =

United States post offices operate under the authority of the United States Post Office Department (1792–1971) or the United States Postal Service (since 1971). Historically, post offices were usually placed in a prominent location. Many were architecturally distinctive, including notable buildings featuring Beaux-Arts, Art Deco, and Vernacular architecture. However, modern U.S. post offices were generally designed for functionality rather than architectural style.

Following is a list of United States post offices in Montana. Notable post offices include individual buildings, whether still in service or not, which have architectural, historical, or community-related significance. Many of these are listed on the National Register of Historic Places (NRHP) or state and local historic registers.

Post office	City	Date built	Image	Architect	Notes	Ref.
U.S. Post Office-Anaconda Main	Anaconda	1932–1933		James A. Wetmore	(Note: Listed on the National Register of Historic Places)	
United States Post Office and Courthouse–Billings	Billings	1914		Oscar Wenderoth		
U.S. Post Office (Butte, Montana), now Mike Mansfield Federal Building and United States Courthouse	Butte	1904, 1932		James Knox Taylor, James Wetmore	(Note: No longer used as a post office.)	
U.S. Post Office-Dillon Main	Dillon	1935–1936		Louis A. Simon		
United States Post Office and Courthouse–Glasgow Main	Glasgow	1939		Louis A. Simon		
United States Post Office (Glendive, Montana)	Glendive	1935		Louis A. Simon		
United States Post Office and Courthouse–Great Falls	Great Falls	1912		James Knox Taylor		
United States Post Office and Courthouse–Havre Main	Havre	1932		James A. Wetmore		
United States Post Office and Federal Building-Lewistown	Lewistown	1931		James A. Wetmore		
United States Post Office-Livingston Main	Livingston	1913–1914		Oscar Wenderoth		
Miles City Main Post Office	Miles City	1916		Oscar Wenderoth		
United States Post Office (Missoula, Montana)	Missoula	1911–1913		James Knox Taylor		
