= U.S. Post Office and Courthouse =

U.S. Post Office and Courthouse, or variations such as Federal Courthouse and Post Office or prefixed by Old, may refer to:

- U.S. Courthouse and Post Office (Huntsville, Alabama)
- Frank M. Johnson Jr. Federal Building and United States Courthouse, Montgomery, Alabama, and also known as US Post Office and Courthouse
- Sitka U.S. Post Office and Court House, in Sitka, Alaska
- Cordova Post Office and Courthouse, in Cordova, Alaska
- United States Post Office and Courthouse–Globe Main, Globe, Arizona, in Gila County
- U.S. Post Office and Courthouse–Prescott Main, Prescott, Arizona, in Yavapai County
- James A. Walsh United States Courthouse, Tucson, Arizona, NRHP-listed as U.S. Post Office and Courthouse, in Pima County
- Fort Smith U.S. Post Office and Courthouse, Fort Smith, Arkansas
- Little Rock U.S. Post Office and Courthouse, Little Rock, Arkansas
- Texarkana United States Post Office and Courthouse, Texarkana, Arkansas
- U.S. Post Office and Courthouse (Eureka, California)
- U.S. Post Office, Courthouse and Federal Building (Sacramento, California)
- U.S. Post Office and Courthouse (San Francisco, California)
- U.S. Post Office and Courthouse (Miami, Florida)
- Old U.S. Post Office and Courthouse (Miami, Florida)
- U.S. Post Office and Courthouse (Albany, Georgia)
- Elbert P. Tuttle U.S. Court of Appeals Building, Atlanta, Georgia, also known as U.S. Post Office and Courthouse
- United States Post Office and Courthouse (Augusta, Georgia)
- U.S. Post Office and Courthouse (Columbus, Georgia)
- U.S. Post Office and Courthouse (Rome, Georgia)
- U.S. Post Office and Courthouse (Waycross, Georgia)
- Moscow Post Office and Courthouse, in Moscow, Idaho
- United States Post Office and Courthouse (East St. Louis, Illinois), NRHP-listed
- U.S. Post Office and Courthouse (Peoria, Illinois)
- U.S. Post Office and Courthouse (Quincy, Illinois)
- U.S. Post Office and Courthouse (Fort Wayne, Indiana)
- U.S. Courthouse and Post Office (Indianapolis, Indiana)
- United States Post Office and Court House (Davenport, Iowa)
- U.S. Post Office and Courthouse (Keokuk, Iowa)
- United States Post Office and Courthouse (Sioux City, Iowa)
- United States Post Office and Court House (Topeka, Kansas), NRHP-listed
- Old United States Courthouse and Post Office (Frankfort, Kentucky)
- United States Post Office and Court House (Lexington, Kentucky)
- U.S. Post Office and Courthouse–Alexandria, Alexandria, Louisiana
- U.S. Post Office and Courthouse–Baton Rouge, Baton Rouge, Louisiana
- U.S. Post Office and Courthouse (Shreveport, Louisiana)
- United States Post Office and Courthouse (Baltimore, Maryland)
- Harold D. Donohue Federal Building and United States Courthouse, in Worcester County, Massachusetts
- U.S. Post Office and Courthouse (Fergus Falls, Minnesota), NRHP-listed
- Federal Courthouse and Post Office (Mankato, Minnesota)
- Federal Courthouse and Post Office (Moorhead, Minnesota)
- U.S. Courthouse and Post Office (Aberdeen, Mississippi)
- U.S. Post Office, Courthouse, and Customhouse (Biloxi, Mississippi)
- United States Post Office and Courthouse (Meridian, Mississippi)
- U.S. Post Office and Courthouse (Joplin, Missouri)
- United States Courthouse and Post Office (Kansas City, Missouri)
- U.S. Post Office and Courthouse–Billings, Billings, Montana
- U.S. Post Office and Courthouse–Glasgow Main, Glasgow, Montana
- U.S. Post Office and Courthouse–Great Falls, Great Falls, Montana
- U.S. Post Office and Courthouse–Havre Main, Havre, Montana
- Grand Island United States Post Office and Courthouse, in Grand Island, Nebraska
- United States Post Office and Courthouse (Norfolk, Nebraska)
- United States Post Office and Courthouse (Camden, New Jersey)
- United States Courthouse and Post Office (Trenton, New Jersey)
- Las Vegas Post Office and Courthouse, Las Vegas, Nevada
- U.S. Post Office and Courthouse–Littleton Main, Littleton, New Hampshire
- U.S. Post Office and Courthouse (Binghamton, New York), listed on the NRHP in Broome County
- United States Post Office and Courthouse (Guilford, North Carolina), NRHP-listed
- United States Post Office and Courthouse (New Bern, North Carolina, 1935), a contributing property
- U.S. Post Office and County Courthouse (Statesville, North Carolina)
- United States Post Office and Courthouse (Bismarck, North Dakota)
- United States Post Office and Courthouse (Devils Lake, North Dakota)
- United States Post Office and Courthouse (Grand Forks, North Dakota)
- United States Post Office and Courthouse (Columbus, Ohio)
- United States Post Office and Courthouse (Muskogee, Oklahoma)
- Post Office, Courthouse, and Federal Office Building (Oklahoma City, Oklahoma)
- United States Post Office and Courthouse (Tulsa, Oklahoma)
- Woodward Federal Courthouse and Post Office, Woodward, Oklahoma
- United States Post Office and Courthouse (Medford, Oregon)
- United States Post Office and Courthouse (Pendleton, Oregon)
- Erie Federal Courthouse and Post Office, in Erie, Pennsylvania
- United States Post Office and Courthouse (Pittsburgh, Pennsylvania)
- Miguel Angel García Méndez Post Office Building, Mayaguez, Puerto Rico, as "U.S. Post Office and Courthouse"
- Jose V. Toledo Federal Building and United States Courthouse, San Juan, Puerto Rico, NRHP-listed as "U.S. Post Office and Courthouse"
- U.S. Post Office and Courthouse (Charleston, South Carolina)
- Old Greenville City Hall, Greenville, South Carolina, also known as US Post Office and Courthouse, formerly
- U.S. Post Office and Courthouse (Rock Hill, South Carolina)
- U.S. Post Office and Courthouse–Aberdeen, in Aberdeen, South Dakota
- United States Post Office and Courthouse (Knoxville, Tennessee), in Knoxville, Tennessee
- Amarillo U.S. Post Office and Courthouse, in Amarillo, Texas
- Old U.S. Post Office and Courts Building (Jefferson, Texas), in Jefferson, Texas
- San Antonio U.S. Post Office and Courthouse, in San Antonio, Texas
- Sherman U.S. Post Office and Courthouse, in Sherman, Texas
- Tyler U.S. Post Office and Courthouse, in Tyler, Texas
- U.S. Post Office and Courthouse (Ogden, Utah)
- U.S. Post Office and Courthouse (Big Stone Gap, Virginia)
- U.S. Post Office and Courthouse (Norfolk, Virginia)
- Lewis F. Powell, Jr., United States Courthouse, listed on the NRHP in Richmond, Virginia, as "U.S. Post Office and Customhouse"
- U.S. Post Office and Courthouse (Bellingham, Washington)
- U.S. Post Office and Courthouse (Yakima, Washington)
- United States Post Office and Court House (Huntington, West Virginia)
- U.S. Post Office and Courthouse (Eau Claire, Wisconsin)
- U.S. Post Office and Courthouse (Lander, Wyoming)

== See also ==
- List of United States post offices
