= Federal Building (disambiguation) =

A federal building houses local offices of government departments and agencies in countries with a federal system.

Federal Building may also refer to:

== United States ==
- Federal Building, Ketchikan, Alaska
- Federal Building (Little Rock, Arkansas)
- Federal Building (Sacramento), California
- Federal Building (Colorado Springs, Colorado)
- Federal Building, U.S. Courthouse, Downtown Postal Station in Tampa, Florida
- Federal Building, United States Post Office and Courthouse (Hilo, Hawaii)
- Federal Building (Ruston, Louisiana)
- Federal Building (Flint, Michigan)
- Federal Building (Port Huron, Michigan)
- Federal Building, Grand Island, Nebraska
- Federal Building (Laconia, New Hampshire)
- Federal Building (Raleigh, North Carolina)
- Federal Building (Wilkesboro, North Carolina)
- Federal Building (Gettysburg, Pennsylvania)
- Federal Building (Providence, Rhode Island)
- Federal Building (Milwaukee, Wisconsin)

== Elsewhere ==
- Federal Building, Edmonton, Alberta, Canada

== See also ==
- Federal Courts Building (disambiguation)
- Federal Office Building (disambiguation)
