= List of United States federal courthouses in Nebraska =

Following is a list of current and former courthouses of the United States federal court system located in Nebraska. Each entry indicates the name of the building along with an image, if available, its location and the jurisdiction it covers, the dates during which it was used for each such jurisdiction, and, if applicable the person for whom it was named, and the date of renaming. Dates of use will not necessarily correspond with the dates of construction or demolition of a building, as pre-existing structures may be adapted or court use, and former court buildings may later be put to other uses. Also, the official name of the building may be changed at some point after its use as a federal court building has been initiated.

== Courthouses ==
| Courthouse | City | Image | Street address | Jurisdiction | Dates of use | Named for |
|---|---|---|---|---|---|---|
| U.S. Post Office | Chadron | | 278 Main Street | D. Neb. | 1919–1955; Still in use as a post office. | n/a |
| U.S. Post Office & Courthouse^{†} | Grand Island | | 203 West Second Street | D. Neb. | 1910–? | n/a |
| U.S. Post Office | Hastings | | ? | D. Neb. | 1907–1955; Completed in 1905. Razed in the 1970s. | n/a |
| Old City Hall† | Lincoln | | 920 East O Street | D. Neb. | 1879–1906; Now in use by city agencies. | n/a |
| U.S. Courthouse & Post Office | Lincoln | | 129 North 10th Street | D. Neb. | 1906–1969; Now a mixed-use facility. | n/a |
| Robert V. Denney Federal Building | Lincoln | | 100 Centennial Mall North | D. Neb. | 1975–present | U.S. Rep. Robert Vernon Denney |
| U.S. Post Office & Courthouse | McCook | | 401 Norris Avenue | D. Neb. | 1916–1955; Now privately owned. | n/a |
| U.S. Post Office & Courthouse^{†} | Norfolk | | 125 South 4th Street | D. Neb. | 1904–1955; Now privately owned. | n/a |
| U.S. Post Office & Courthouse† | North Platte | | 416 North Jeffers Street | D. Neb. | 1913–? Now the Prairie Arts Center | n/a |
| North Platte Federal Building | North Platte | | 300 East Third Street | D. Neb. | ?–2014; Still in use by the federal government. | n/a |
| Lincoln County Courthouse† | North Platte | | 301 North Jeffers Street | D. Neb. | ?–present Occasionally used by the federal court | n/a |
| U.S. Courthouse, Custom House & Post Office | Omaha | | ? | D. Neb. | 1899–? Razed in the mid-1960s | n/a |
| Federal Office Building† | Omaha | | 106 South 15th Street | D. Neb. | 1933–c. 1960s Still in use by the federal government. | n/a |
| Edward Zorinsky Federal Building | Omaha | | 1616 Capital Avenue | D. Neb. | 1960s–2000 Still in use by the federal government. | U.S. Senator Edward Zorinsky |
| Roman L. Hruska Federal Courthouse | Omaha | | 111 South 18th Plaza | D. Neb. | 2000–present | U.S. Senator Roman Hruska |

== Key ==
| ^{†} | Listed on the National Register of Historic Places (NRHP) |
| ^{††} | NRHP-listed and also designated as a National Historic Landmark |
