= Federal Courts Building =

Federal Courts Building may refer to:

- United States Courthouse and Post Office (Kansas City, Missouri), historic courthouse and post office, also known as Federal Courts Building, in Kansas City, Missouri
- Landmark Center (St. Paul), historic United States Post Office, Courthouse, and Custom House for the state of Minnesota, also known as Old Federal Courts Building, in Saint Paul, Minnesota
