= Federal Office Building =

Federal Office Building may refer to:

in the United States

(by state)

- Federal Office Building 6 (FOB 6), original name of the Lyndon Baines Johnson Department of Education Building in Washington, D.C.
- Federal Office Building (Omaha, Nebraska), listed on the National Register of Historic Places (NRHP)
- Federal Office Building (New York, New York), listed on the NRHP
- Post Office, Courthouse, and Federal Office Building, Oklahoma City, Oklahoma, listed on the NRHP
- Customs House (Nashville, Tennessee), also known as Federal Office Building, listed on the NRHP
- Estes Kefauver Federal Building and United States Courthouse, Nashville, Tennessee, listed on the NRHP
- Federal Office Building (Austin, Texas), listed on the NRHP in Travis County, Texas
- Federal Office Building (Seattle, Washington), listed on the NRHP
- Federal Office Building (Cheyenne, Wyoming), listed on the NRHP in Laramie Count

== See also ==
- Federal Building (disambiguation)
- Federal Triangle, multiple buildings in Washington D.C.
