= United States Post Office and Courthouse (Columbus, Georgia) =

- U.S. Post Office and Courthouse
- U.S. National Register of Historic Places
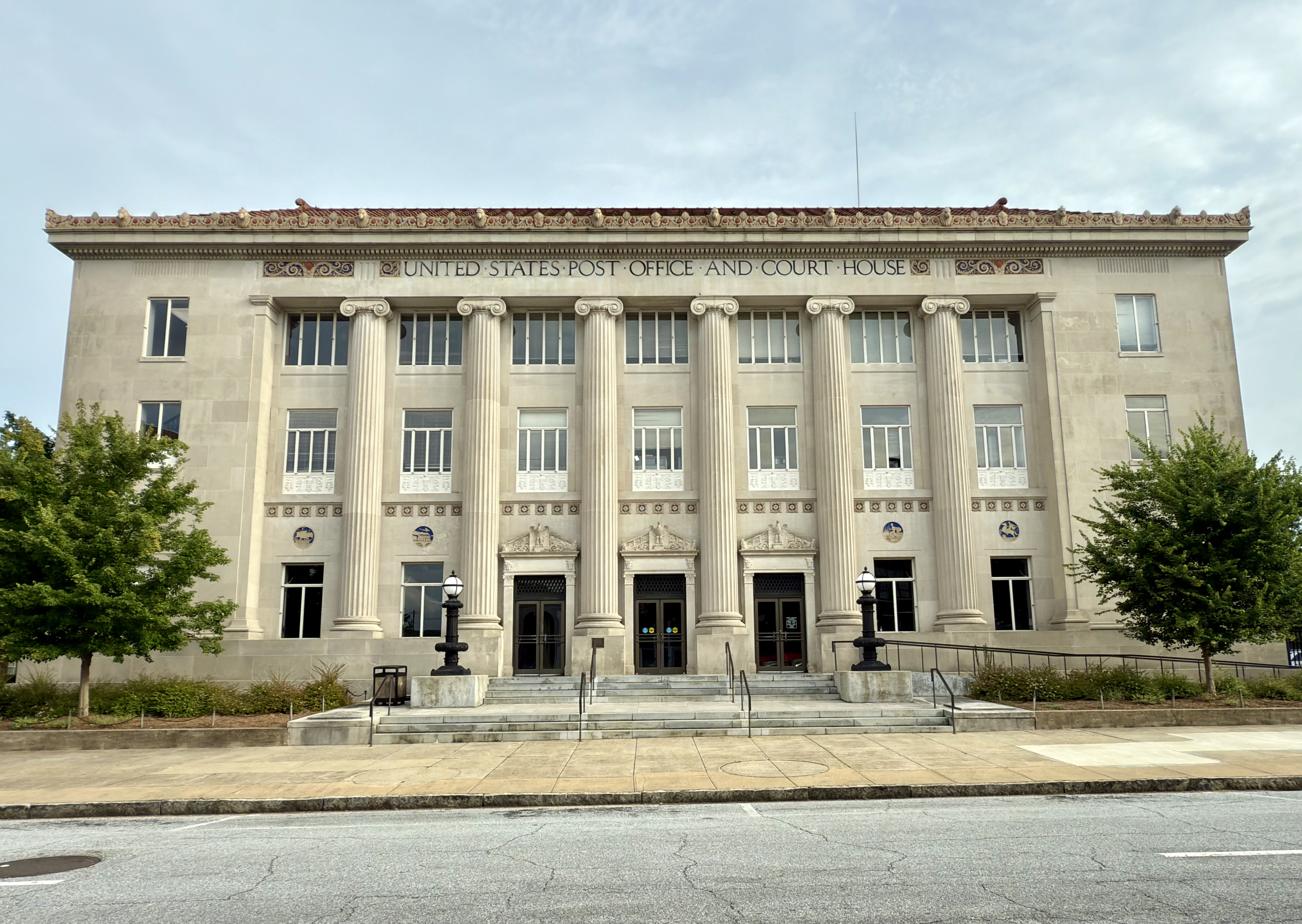
- The building in 2025

- Location within Georgia Location within the United States
- Location: Columbus, Georgia
- Coordinates: 32°28′6″N 84°59′27″W
- Built: 1933
- Architect: Edwards & Sayward; E. Oren Smith
- MPS: Columbus MRA
- NRHP reference No.: 80001207
- Added to NRHP: September 29, 1980

The U.S. Post Office and Courthouse, built in 1933, is an historic United States Post Office and federal courthouse building located at 120 12th Street in Columbus, Georgia. It was designed by Atlanta-based architect William Augustus Edwards who designed nine South Carolina courthouses as well as academic buildings at 12 institutions in Florida, Georgia and South Carolina. On September 29, 1980, it was added to the National Register of Historic Places.

== See also ==
- National Register of Historic Places listings in Muscogee County, Georgia
- U.S. Post Office and Courthouse (disambiguation)
- List of United States post offices
