= United States Post Office (Glendive, Montana) =

- U.S. Post Office
- U.S. National Register of Historic Places
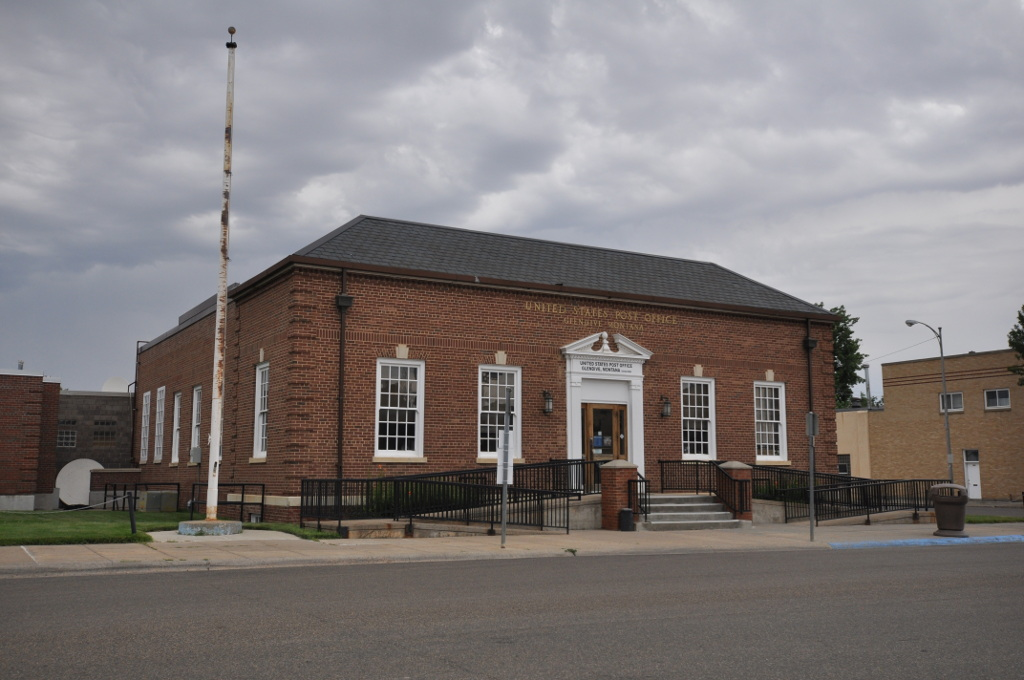

- Location within Montana Location within the United States
- Location: 221 N. Kendrick, Glendive, Montana
- Coordinates: 47°6′24″N 104°42′47″W
- Area: less than one acre
- Built: 1935
- Built by: John Sterhan
- Architect: Louis A. Simon, et al.
- Architectural style: Colonial Revival
- MPS: Glendive MRA
- NRHP reference No.: 87002503
- Added to NRHP: February 3, 1988

The U.S. Post Office in Glendive in Dawson County, Montana was built in 1935 with elements of Colonial Revival style. It was listed on the National Register of Historic Places in 1988, as part of a study of multiple historic resources in Glendive which also listed several others.

It was deemed significant as representing "the use of quality materials and craftsmanship characteristic of federal construction during the Depression Era and symbolizes the solidity of a federal institution in a small city."
