= Federal Building (Gettysburg, Pennsylvania) =

Coordinates: 41.14456°N 78.79926°W

The Federal Building is a historic structure in Gettysburg, Pennsylvania. It was erected in 1913, the 50th anniversary year of the Battle of Gettysburg. The main Adams County Library building since 1992, it previously served as the War Department/National Park Service headquarters of the Gettysburg National Military Park from 1912 to 1962 and as a branch of the United States Post Office.

In 2014, the Adams County Library System celebrated the building's 100th anniversary with three days of community events.

== History ==
During the 1860s, the original branch of the U.S. Post Office in Gettysburg was located at the west of the borough square (later the site of the 1906 First National Bank building). It was captured by the Army of Northern Virginia during the Battle of Gettysburg in early July 1863.

In 1910, borough leaders requested that a new facility for federal offices be built. After construction on the design by GNMP superintendent Emmor Cope had begun, it was briefly suspended. Beginning in 1912, the building served as Gettysburg’s new branch of the U.S. Post Office, and also housed offices for the Internal Revenue Service and Gettysburg National Military Park.

During his tenure as President of the United States, Dwight D. Eisenhower also maintained an office in the building. He did so, after suffering a heart attack in September 1955, "so that the press would photograph him going to and from work, thus ensuring the American people that their president was well and on the job," according to historian Michael J. Birkner.

The building's 100th anniversary was commemorated in 2014 with a series of special events over a three-day period, including a gala (February 21), Children's Day (February 22), and open house (February 23).

== Architectural features ==
The front steps and columns along Baltimore Street (formerly the entrance) are similar to the Lincoln Memorial style of Federal architecture.
