= Federal Building (Flint, Michigan) =

- United States Post Office
- U.S. National Register of Historic Places
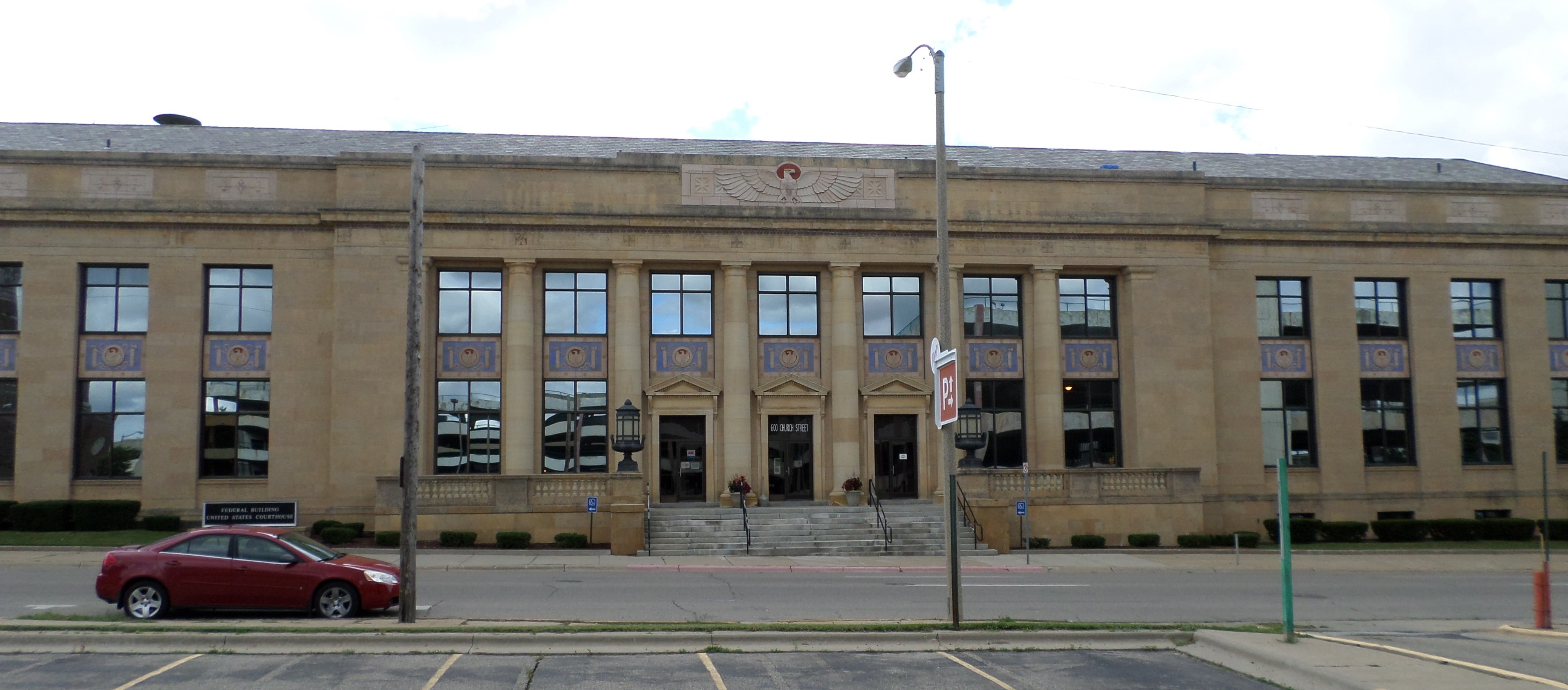

- Location within Michigan Location within the United States
- Interactive map showing the location of the Federal Building, Flint
- Location: 600 Church St., Flint, Michigan
- Coordinates: 43°0′48″N 83°41′32″W
- Area: 1 acre (0.40 ha)
- Built: 1931
- Architect: James A. Wetmore
- Architectural style: Art Moderne
- NRHP reference No.: 13000321
- Added to NRHP: May 22, 2013

The Federal Building (also known as the United States Post Office) is a US government office building located at 600 Church Street in Flint, Michigan. It was listed on the National Register of Historic Places in 2013.

== History ==
Postal service in Flint was established in 1832, and the post office location changed a number of times through the nineteenth century. At the beginning of the twentieth century, Flint began to grow hand-in-hand with the rise of the automobile industry, and in 1909 the post office moved into a new building on Kearsley Street. However, Flint's rapid growth quickly made even the new post office too small. In response, an addition was built in 1921, and a branch office established in 1925. However, even in 1926, the postal facilities were woefully inadequate, with lines for the teller window stretching over half a block on occasions. Local citizens lobbied the US government for a new building, and in 1927 announced that a new Flint Post Office would be placed in the first building program authorized for funding. A site was chosen in 1928, and in 1930 James A. Wetmore, Acting Supervisory Architect of the Treasury Department, signed off on a set of plans for the new building. Construction was completed in 1931.

In addition to housing a new post office, the Internal Revenue Service, United States Department of Agriculture, United States Army, and United States Navy all opened offices in the new building. The building served as the main Flint facility until about 1960, when a new post office was constructed. The Church Street location was remodeled to serve as a branch post office, as well as housing other federal facilities including the courts.

== Description ==
The Flint Federal Building is a classical moderne two-story building faced with Kasota limestone. The front facade is symmetrical, end extends for 230 feet along Church Street. The facade contains a broad pavilion with colonnade with four bays to each side. A terrace edged with a balustrade projects from the central pavilion, and leads to three pedimented doorways. Window openings in the central colonnade and the side bays feature stacked windows with spandrels between them. Polychromatic terra-cotta panels with Art Moderne iconography, thematic to the buildings use, are set into the spandrels as well as into the parapet wall above. A large one-story wing and a modern secure garage project from the rear of the building.
