= United States Post Office and Courthouse (Norfolk, Nebraska) =

- U.S. Post Office and Courthouse
- U.S. National Register of Historic Places
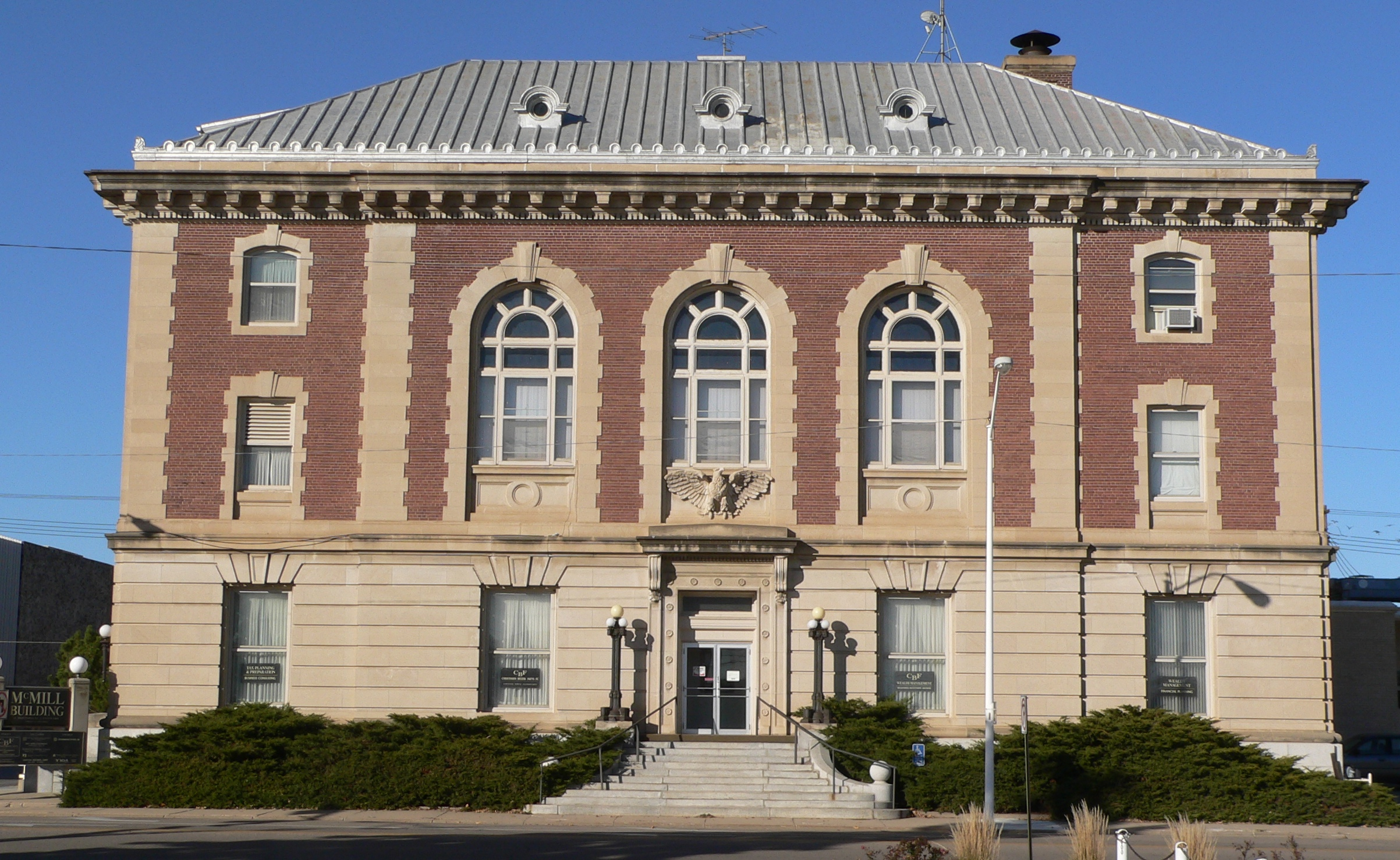

- Location within Nebraska Location within the United States
- Location: 125 S. 4th St., Norfolk, Nebraska
- Coordinates: 42°1′54.5″N 97°24′41.5″W
- Area: 0.5 acres (0.20 ha)
- Built: 1904
- Architect: James Knox Taylor
- Architectural style: Late 19th and 20th Century Revivals
- NRHP reference No.: 74001128
- Added to NRHP: October 9, 1974

The U.S. Post Office and Courthouse in Norfolk, Nebraska, United States, was built in 1904. Designed by James Knox Taylor, it includes Late 19th and 20th Century Revivals architecture. It served historically as a courthouse, as a correctional facility, and as a post office. It was listed on the National Register of Historic Places in 1974.

The building is now privately owned, and houses a number of offices. It has been named the McMill Building, the "McMill" deriving not from a person's name, but from the date in Roman numbers, MCMIII, above the west entrance.

== See also ==
- List of United States federal courthouses in Nebraska
