= Billings Chamber of Commerce Building =

- U.S. National Register of Historic Places
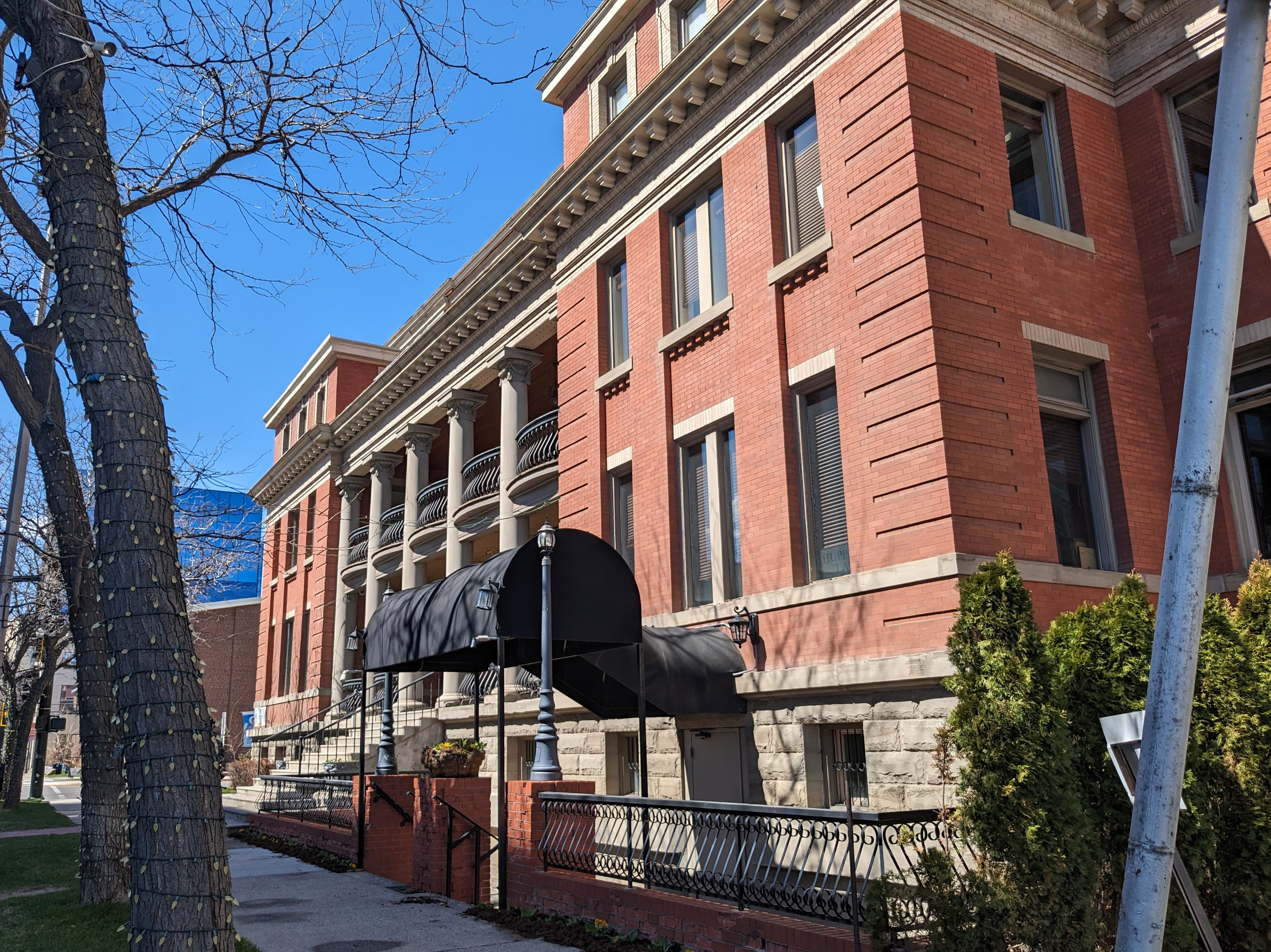

- Location within Montana Location within the United States
- Location: 303 N. 27th St., Billings, Montana
- Coordinates: 45°47′05″N 108°30′19″W
- Area: 1 acre (0.40 ha)
- Built: 1911
- Built by: Gagnon & Co.
- Architect: McAlister, G.
- Architectural style: Late 19th and 20th Century Revivals, Italian Renaissance Revival
- NRHP reference No.: 72000739
- Added to NRHP: January 20, 1972

The Billings Chamber of Commerce Building, at 303 N. 27th St. in Billings, Montana, was built in 1911. It was listed on the National Register of Historic Places in 1972.

It is a three-story brick building upon a sandstone foundation. It was designed by architect G. McAlister in Italian Renaissance Revival style and was built by contractors Gagnon and Company.

It was built as an Elks Club building but the club lost ownership due to debts in 1918.
