= Billings City Hall =

- James F. Battin Federal Building
- U.S. National Register of Historic Places
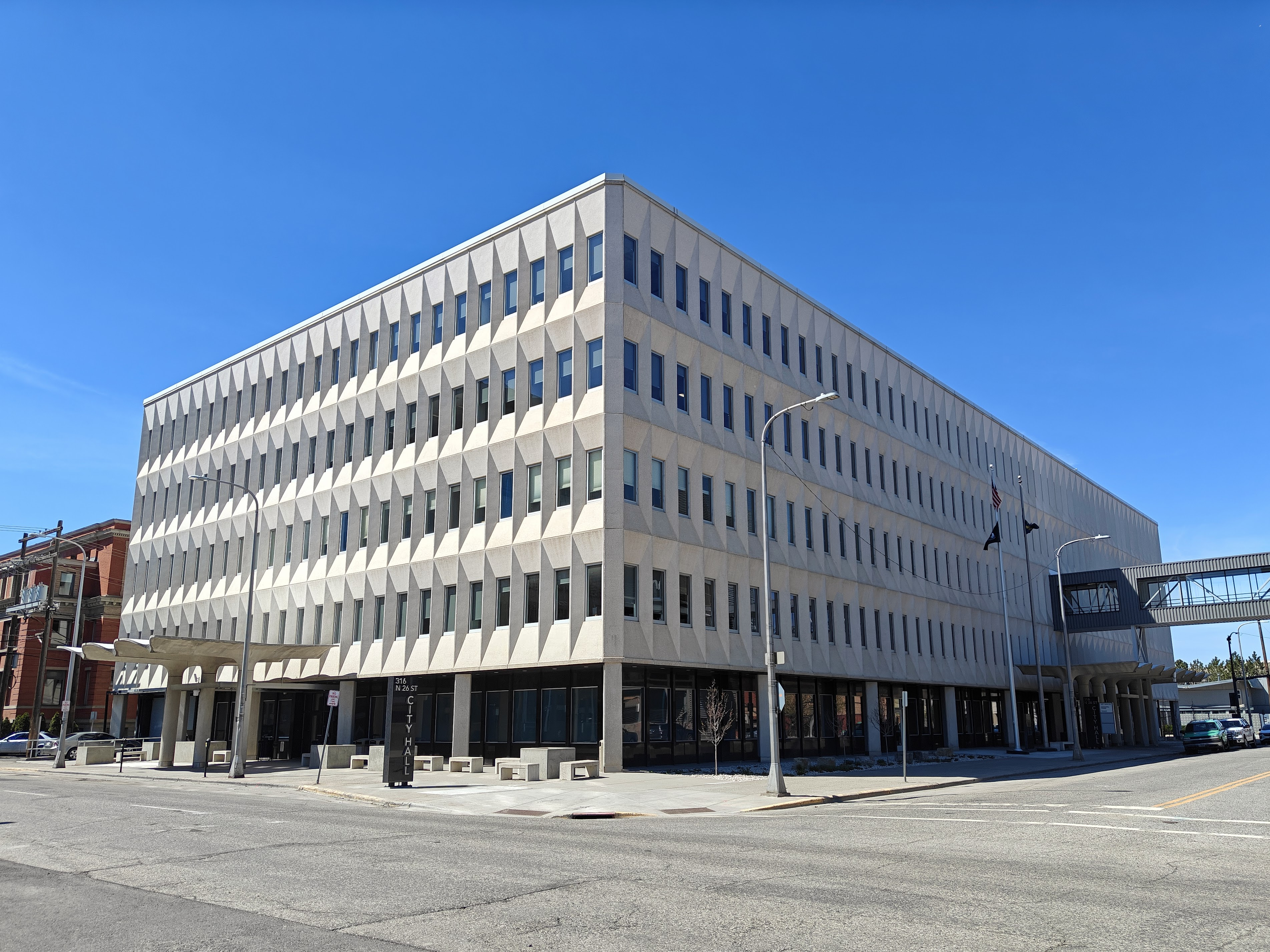
- Billings City Hall from the southeast, 2025
- Location: 316 N. 26th Street, Billings, Montana
- Coordinates: 45.7852°N 108.5058°W
- Built: 1965
- Architect: J.G. Link
- Architectural style: New Formalism
- Website: billingsmt.gov
- NRHP reference No.: 100008535
- Added to NRHP: January 13, 2023

The current Billings City Hall, formerly the James F. Battin Federal Building and also known as the Stillwater Building, is an NRHP-listed government building in downtown Billings, Montana, USA. After its completion in 1965, it housed federal courts and agency offices until 2013. Following extensive interior renovations, it has served as the new Billings City Hall since 2025.

== History ==
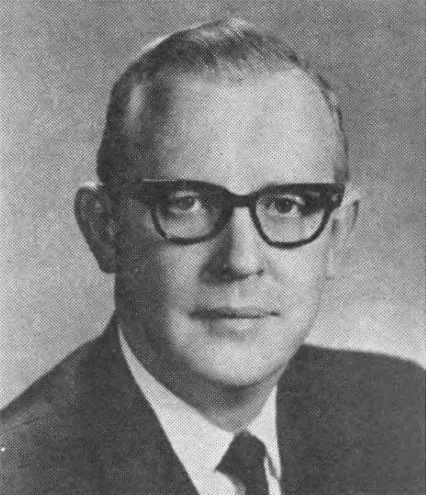
James F. Battin, 1965

The federal government identified the need for a federal building in Billings in 1957, which would gather various federal agencies with existing downtown offices under one roof. Architectural plans by the firm J.G. Link were finalized in late 1961. Funding was secured in 1962 thanks to advocacy at the federal level by legislators Mike Mansfield, Lee Metcalf, and James F. Battin.

The building contractor was the Hegeman-Harris Company of New York, which engaged around 20 subcontractors. Construction started in March 1962, and the cornerstone was set on October 9, 1964. The General Services Administration (GSA), which would operate the building, moved into its new offices in April 1965. Other occupants included a federal district court; magistrate and bankruptcy courts; and offices for the Bureau of Reclamation, Bureau of Indian Affairs, Department of the Interior, and US Marshal.

In 1999, the building's name was changed to honor state representative James F. Battin. Battin was a Billings native who had worked in the building as a federal court judge from 1978 to 1990.

=== Sale and renovation ===
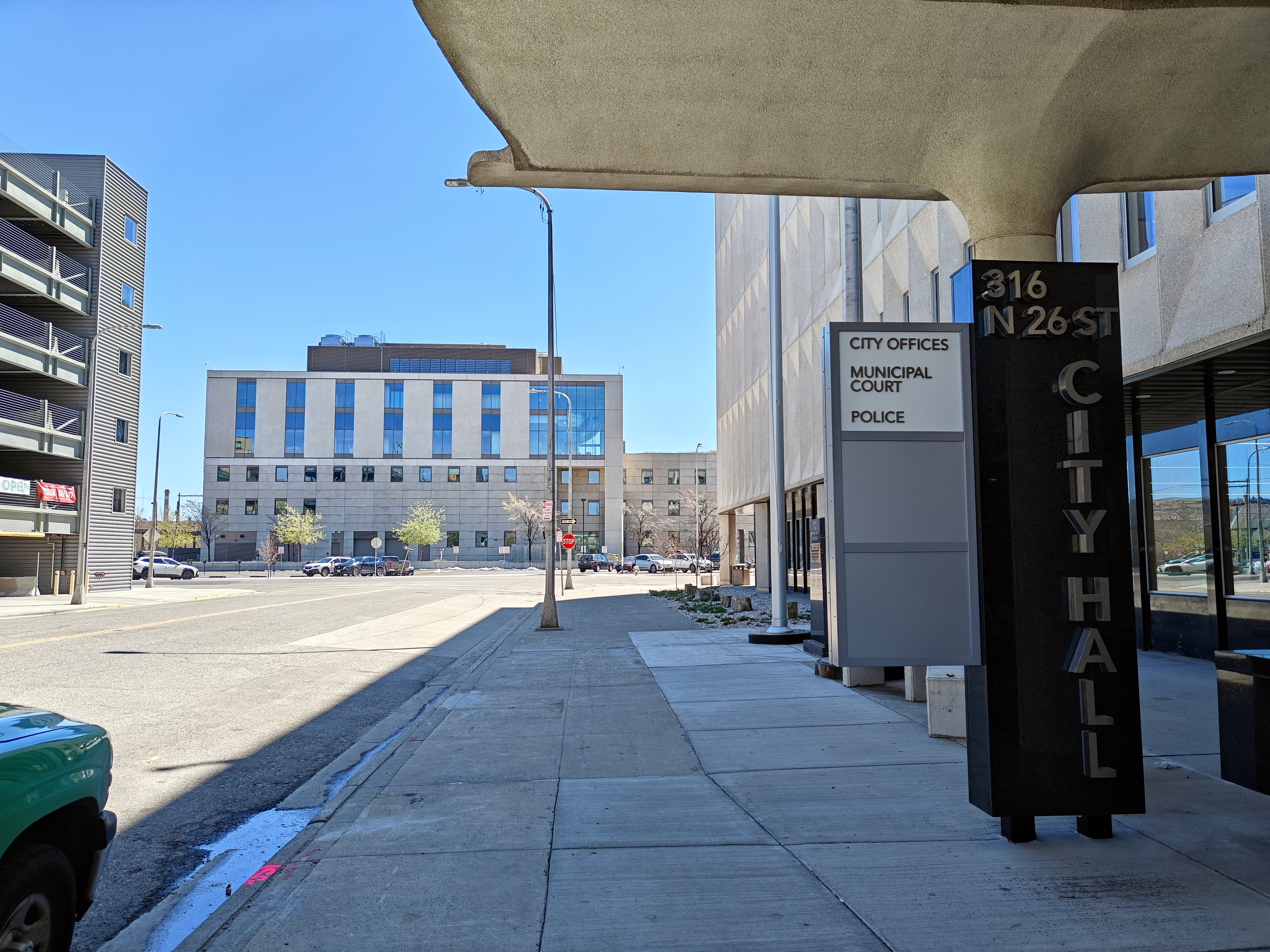
The old Battin Federal Building (foreground) and the replacement James F. Battin Federal Courthouse (background)

Largely because of concerns about asbestos, the GSA decided in 2007 to move federal courts and offices out of the Battin Building. These plans culminated in the construction of two new downtown buildings: a 5-story office building at 2021 4th Avenue South, and a new federal courthouse directly south of the old one. The now-vacant former federal building was purchased by the Colorado Tire Corporation in 2013 and renamed the Kono Building. The building was sold again in 2016, this time to WC Commercial, which abated the asbestos and gutted much of the interior. Yellowstone County moved some offices into the third floor in 2018, the same year that WC Commercial built a skyway connected to a parking garage it owned across the street. During this period, the former Battin Building was known as the Stillwater Building.

After multi-year negotiations, the City of Billings purchased the building in 2021. The city had run out of space at the old City Hall, even after taking creative steps like converting closets and vaults into offices. Following intensive renovations, the city moved various departments into the new City Hall in 2025, including the Parking Division, Public Works, City Council, and Police Department. These included some office previously housed at the Miller Building, which was purchased by Yellowstone County during the build-out of the new City Hall. The renovation, designed by JLG Architects, introduced a two-story atrium intended to maximize natural light. On the top floor, the front wall of the City Council chambers features a cut-out referencing the shape of the Rimrocks.

The building was listed on the National Register of Historic Places in January 2023. It is listed as the James F. Battin Federal Building, its former name.

== Architecture ==
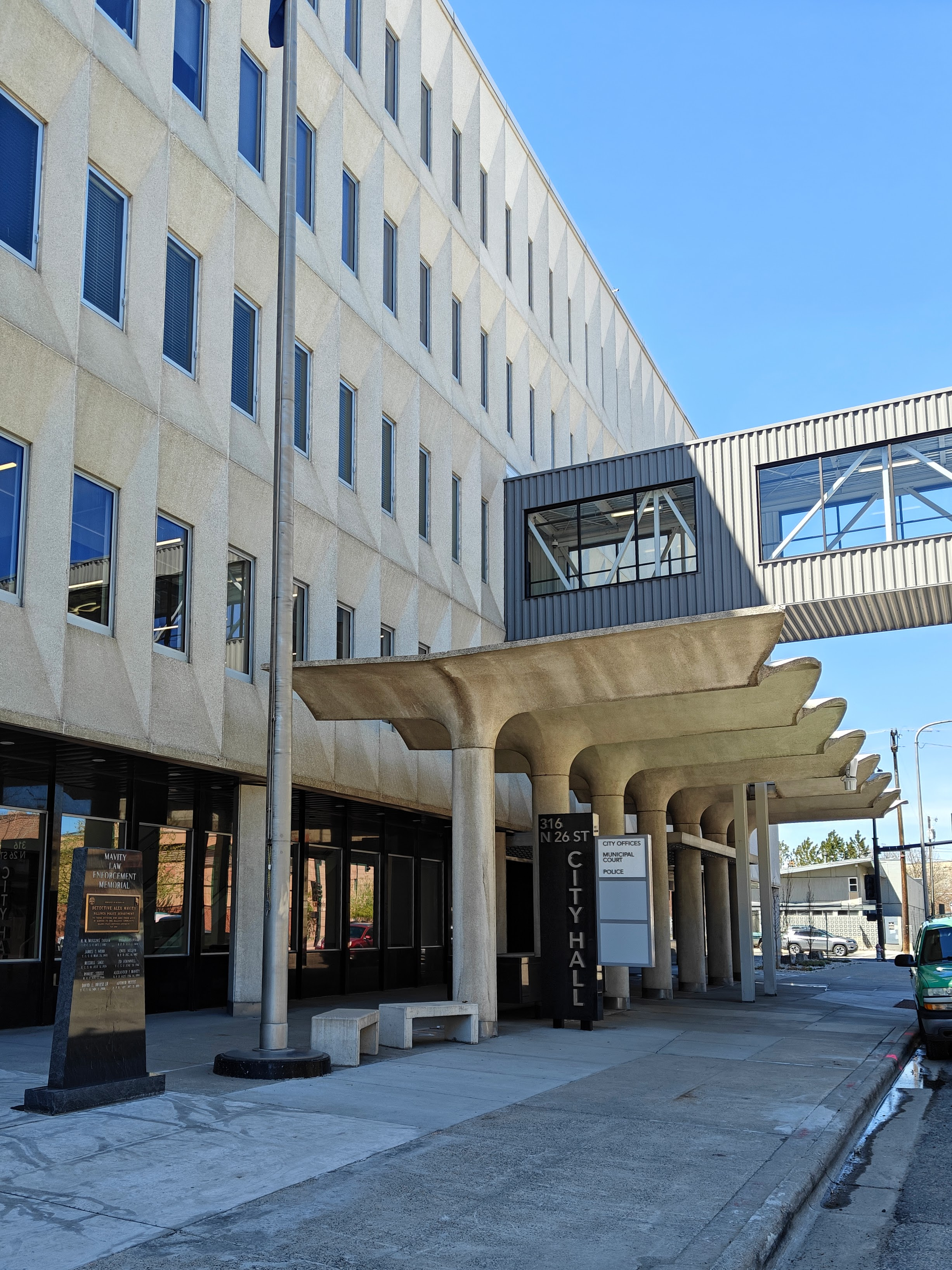
East (main) entry and portico, 2025

Billings City Hall is 5 stories tall, filling half a city block. The building is an example of the Modern style of New Formalism, as demonstrated by its flat roofline, smooth wall treatments, symmetry, and column supports. The lowest floor is clad in black granite and slightly recessed from the upper floors, which are framed in white precast concrete. Each concrete panel surrounds a tall aluminum window. The panels serve to hide structural concrete columns, which are only visible on the first level.

The building's unrelentingly geometric massing is softened by precast concrete canopies, which frame the entrances on the three sides of the building facing city streets (north, east, and south). These canopies, in the shape of barrel vault, originally included aluminum grills that were removed in the mid-2010s. The longest of these canopies, on the east side, frames the building's main entrance.

In 2018, a skyway was built to connect the building's third floor to a parking garage across the street. Architecturally and legally, the skyway is part of the garage, not City Hall.

=== Setting ===
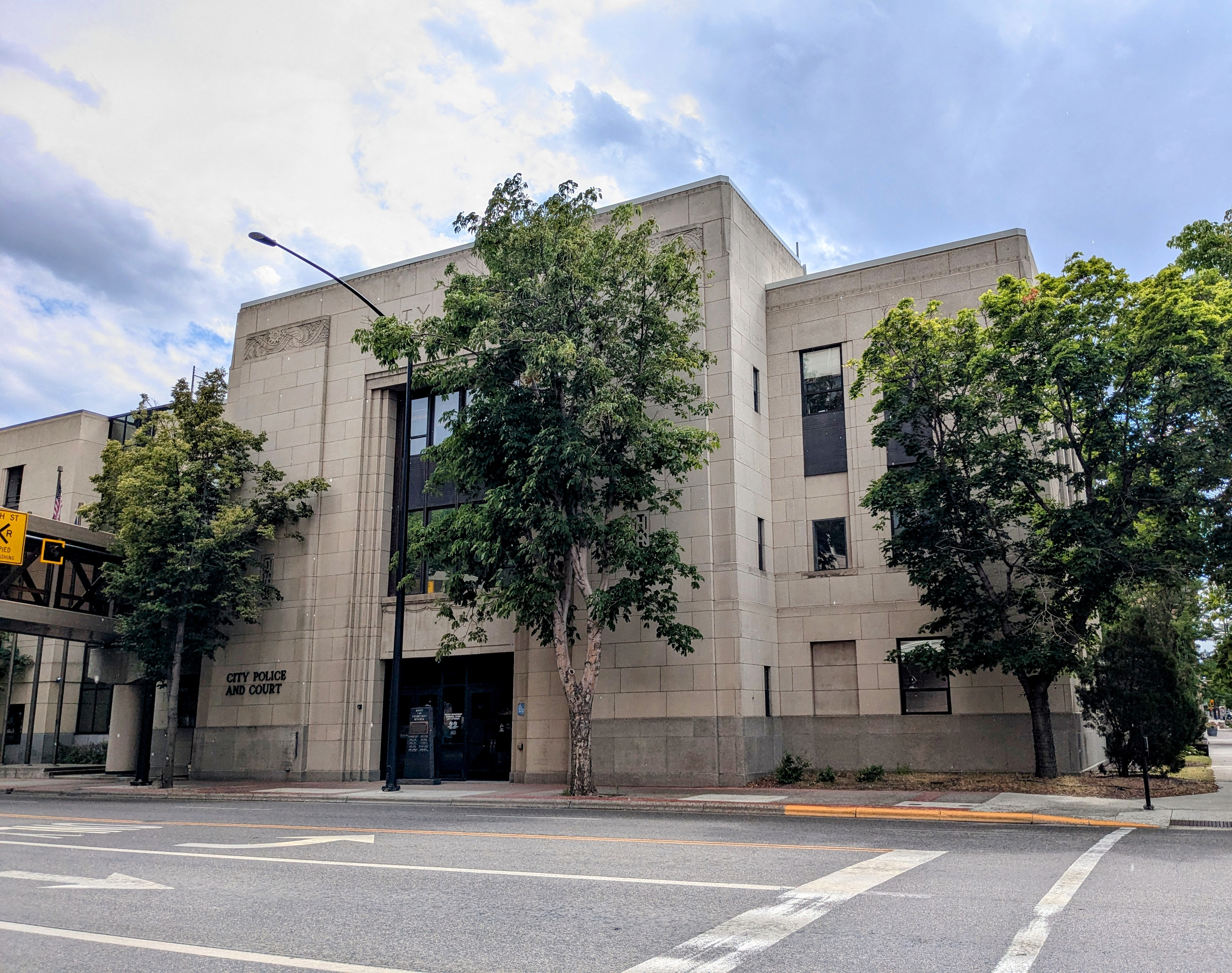
The former Billings City Hall, 2024

The area around Billings City Hall is primarily composed of civic and commercial buildings. Like City Hall, some of these date to the urban renewal period of Montana's midcentury population boom, including the Yellowstone County Courthouse and First Congregational Church. However, some are much older, such as the NRHP-listed Billings Chamber of Commerce Building and the former county jail (now the Yellowstone Art Museum). The replacement James F. Battin Federal Courthouse stands directly to the south.

One block to the southwest is the building at 220 N. 27th Street that served as the earlier City Hall. It was sold to private developers in 2024.

=== Artwork ===
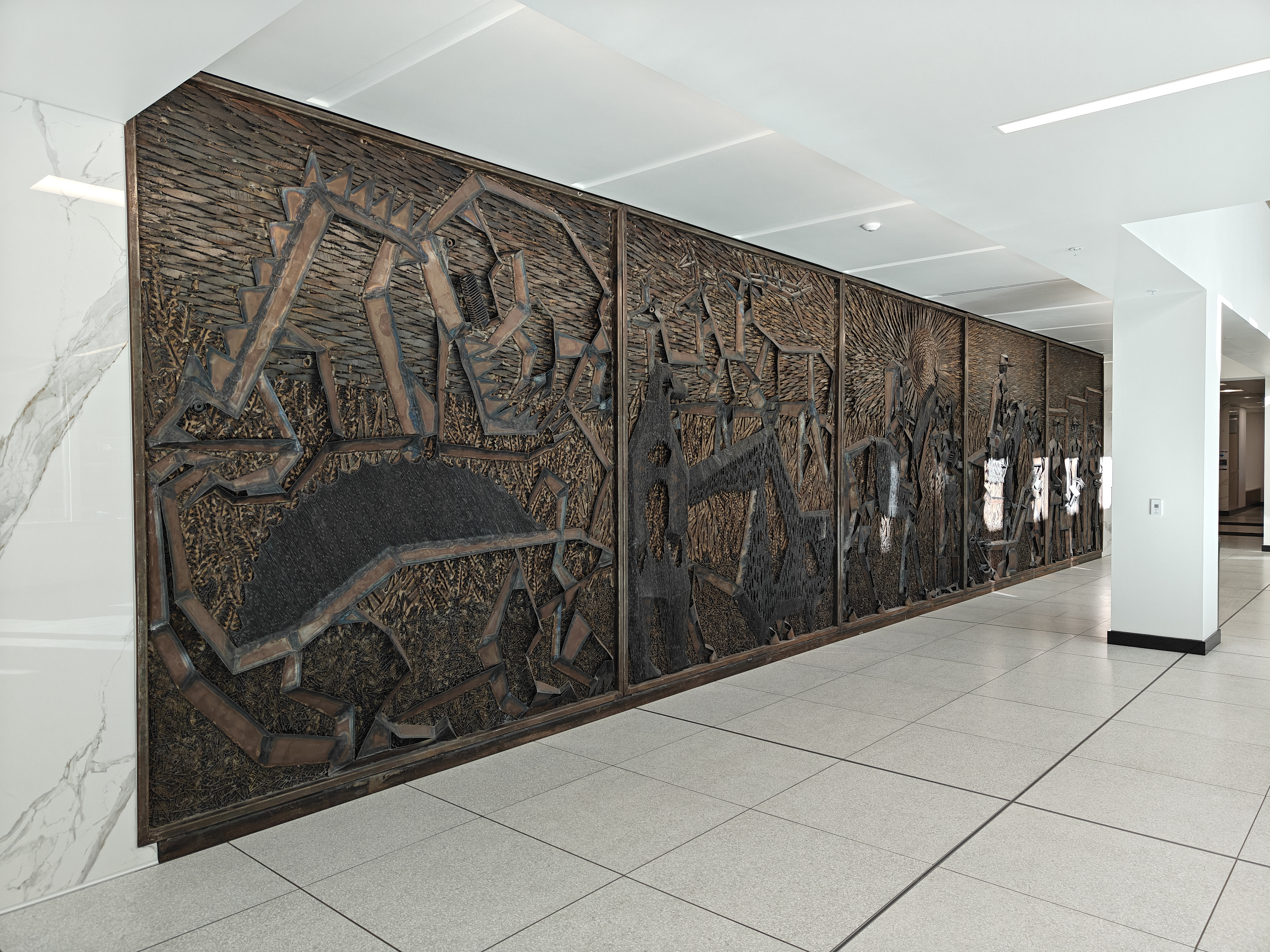
The Philogenic Continuum mural

The GSA commissioned a steel sculptural mural in 1966 from the artist Lyndon Fayne Pomeroy. Titled Philogenic Continuum, the floor-to-ceiling mural's five panels represent the stages of evolution of the region. For decades, the mural faced the elevators on the first floor; it now hangs in the atrium created during the 2020s renovations.
