= United States Courthouse and Post Office (Kansas City, Missouri) =

- U.S. Courthouse and Post Office-Kansas City, MO
- U.S. National Register of Historic Places
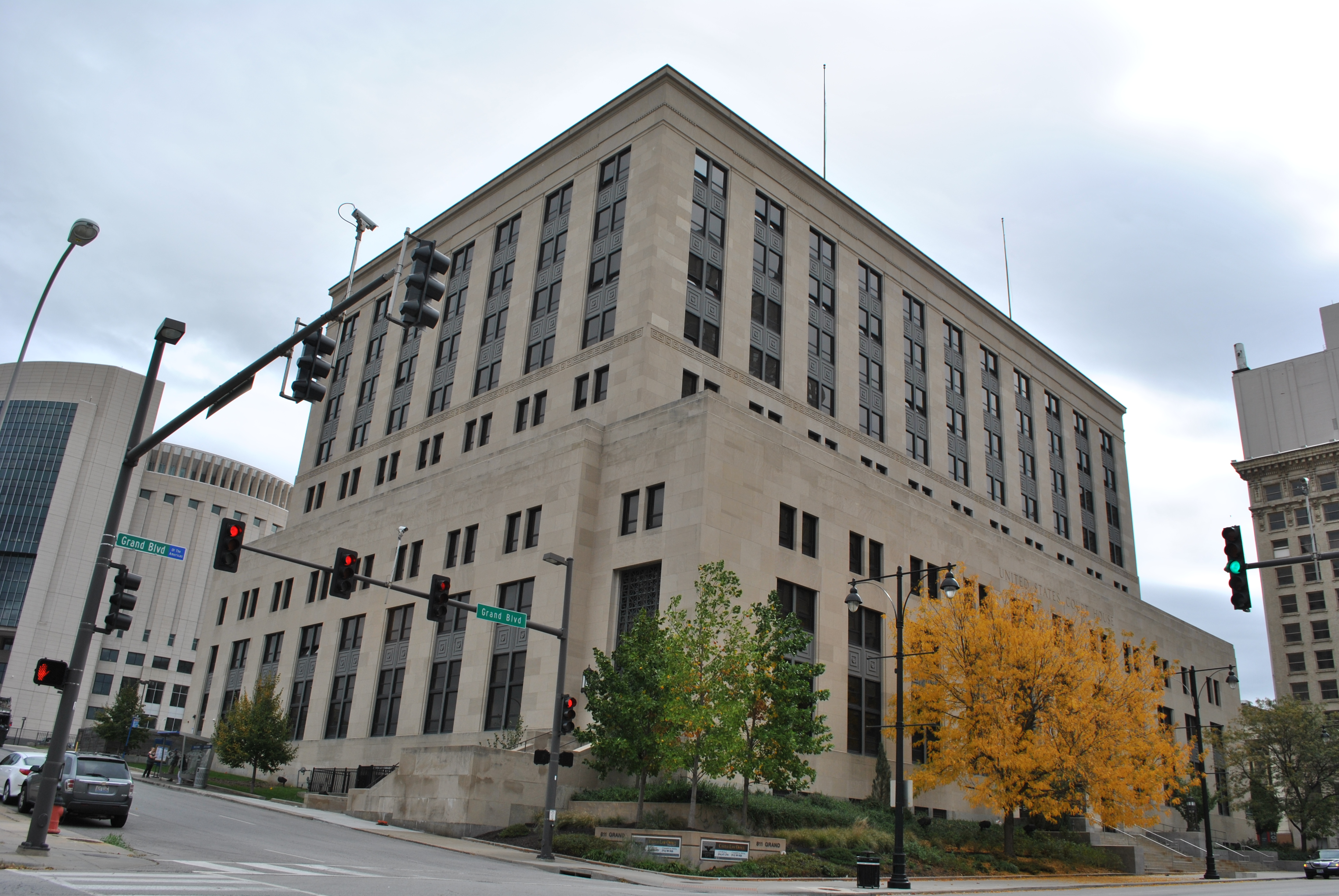
- U.S. Courthouse and Post Office

- Location within Missouri Location within the United States
- Interactive map showing the location of U.S. Courthouse and Post Office-Kansas City
- Location: 811 Grand Blvd., Kansas City, Missouri
- Coordinates: 39°6′24″N 94°34′47″W
- Area: 1.7 acres (0.69 ha)
- Architect: Wight & Wight
- Architectural style: Moderne
- NRHP reference No.: 07001231
- Added to NRHP: November 20, 2007

The United States Courthouse and Post Office, also known as Federal Courts Building, is a historic courthouse and post office located at Kansas City in Jackson County, Missouri. It was formerly the courthouse of the United States District Court for the Western District of Missouri.

== Building history ==
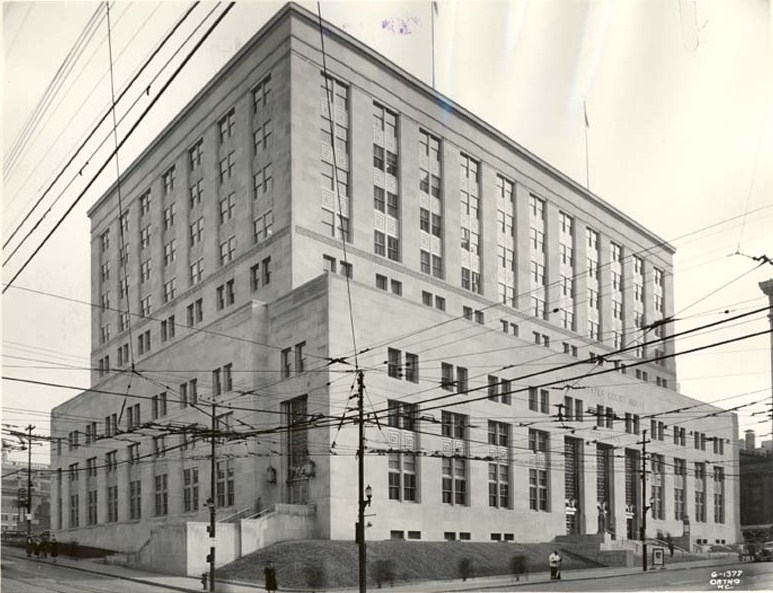
U.S. Courthouse and Post Office

Acting as a point of departure during the great migration to the West, Kansas City experienced phenomenal urban growth and development during the early years of the twentieth century. By 1930, the city's increasing population warranted a new federal building to replace an existing post office and custom house. The 1930s New Deal programs, created to generate employment during the widespread economic downturn of the Great Depression, provided funding for construction of new federal buildings nationwide. Responding to Kansas City's need for a larger, more efficient building, the program funded a new U.S. Post Office and Courthouse in 1935. The building's construction, from 1938 to 1939, symbolized the ideals of the progressive public works projects. As one of the New Deal's last major construction projects of the 1930s, the U.S. Post Office and Courthouse provided modern space to accommodate the burgeoning presence of the federal government in Kansas City.

The building's architectural design was produced by the prominent local architecture firm Wight and Wight, whose distinguished civic work includes the Jackson County Courthouse (1934), City Hall (1937), and the Municipal Courts Building (1938). These projects, including the U.S. Post Office and Courthouse, represent Wight and Wight's shift from the Classical Revival, which previously dominated federal architecture, toward the Moderne movement that was beginning to emerge nationwide during the 1930s. The Courthouse's abstracted classicism with Art Deco references embodies this stylistic transition.

In 1952, the building received national attention when Thurgood Marshall represented the plaintiff of the Swope Park Swimming Pool desegregation case. As the first major desegregation case in Kansas City, the deliberations stirred the burgeoning Civil Rights Movement.

Plans have been made to renovate the entire building to accommodate new, nonfederal tenants as part of an upcoming outlease program. The U.S. Post Office and Courthouse was listed on the National Register of Historic Places in 2003.

== Architecture ==
The U.S. Post Office and Courthouse artfully embodies the Art Modern style that was becoming increasingly influential by the late 1930s - a time when many federal architects experimented with abstracted classical motifs combined with a reduction in architectural ornament. The building's flat planes of Indiana limestone are nearly devoid of classical ornamentation, which is limited to the punctuated regular rhythm of elongated bays.

Encompassing a full city block along Grand Avenue, each of the four sides of the immense ten-story edifice is similar in design, divided into three horizontal sections. The facade's (west elevation's) three-story base rises with smooth walls pierced by elongated bays enclosing the first- and second-story windows, which are divided by decorative spandrels. Each bay is pierced by paired punched windows separated by limestone mullions at the third story. A series of wide granite steps with bronze handrails leads from Grand Avenue to the three central bays enclosing the entrances. The striking dark texture of the cast-bronze door framing and grill work above exhibit restrained classical detailing, and contrast with the light tones and smoothness of the pale-gray Indiana limestone walls.

The upper stories are set back from the base at each elevation, rising five stories in similarly planar limestone walls. The fifth story echoes the fourth-story fenestration and creates the building's middle section by an elegant string course of Greek fretwork. The bays above are elongated to enclose eleven bays of four-story stacked fenestration, with each window divided by decorative aluminum spandrels repeated from the base. Above the ninth story is a wide entablature, composed of a blank architrave and frieze, and a simple cornice.

The interiors retain their original design and continue the spare ornamentation with emphasis on fine materials and abstracted geometric motifs. The vestibule is clad in marble upon a black granite base and features original bronze sidelights flanking each doorway and adjacent recessed wood-paneled telephone niches. The T-shaped central lobby is finished with multicolor terrazzo floors, golden-veined Genevieve marble for the walls, and high plaster ceilings. The cream-colored terrazzo is bordered with black and green terrazzo cross bands to reflect the geometric patterns of the ceiling beams. Marble pilasters detailed with Greek fretwork divide the walls into three bays, while four freestanding, rectangular marble-clad columns dominate the central space. The former postal lobby has similarly refined materials of marble pilasters and terrazzo flooring, with marble wainscoting at the service windows.

At the east side of the central lobby, molded marble surrounds with black granite plinth blocks enclose a bank of six elevators. The north and south lobby walls contain marble-framed double doors with panelized details; these doors lead to the main stairwells, where flights of pink marble stairs and brass railings ascend to the north and south lobbies.

Four historic courtrooms, located on the fourth and sixth floors, exude modernity with elegant finishes, making them the most historically significant spaces within the building. The courtrooms are nearly identical, rising two stories and featuring leather-covered doors, light and dark cork-tile flooring, pink-granite baseboards, and wood-paneled wainscoting. Pilasters divide the space into regular bays, rising to support wood trim and plaster crown moldings. The recessed ceiling panels contain two original brass pendant lights and a large circular aluminum air grille, and are divided by wide beams adorned with gold-leaf paint finishes. The courtrooms are windowless, relying on advanced lighting and an air-conditioning system, considered to be state-of-the-art when the building was completed.

== Significant events ==
- 1935: Congress appropriates $3,300,000 for the construction of the new U.S. Post Office and Courthouse building.
- 1938: The ceremonial cornerstone is laid and construction begins under the supervision of local architects Wight & Wight.
- 1939: The building opens for business.
- 1952: Thurgood Marshall represents the plaintiff of the Swope Park Swimming Pool desegregation.
- 2007: The building was listing on the National Register of Historic Places

== Building facts ==
- Architect: Wight & Wight
- Construction Dates: 1938-39
- Landmark Status: Eligible for listing in the National Register of Historic Places
- Location: 811 Grand Blvd.
- Architectural Style: Art Moderne
- Primary Materials: Indiana Limestone over steel and cast-in-place concrete
- Prominent Features: Exterior bronze ornament; Historic courtrooms
