= Mike Mansfield Federal Building and United States Courthouse =

- U. S. Post Office
- U.S. National Register of Historic Places
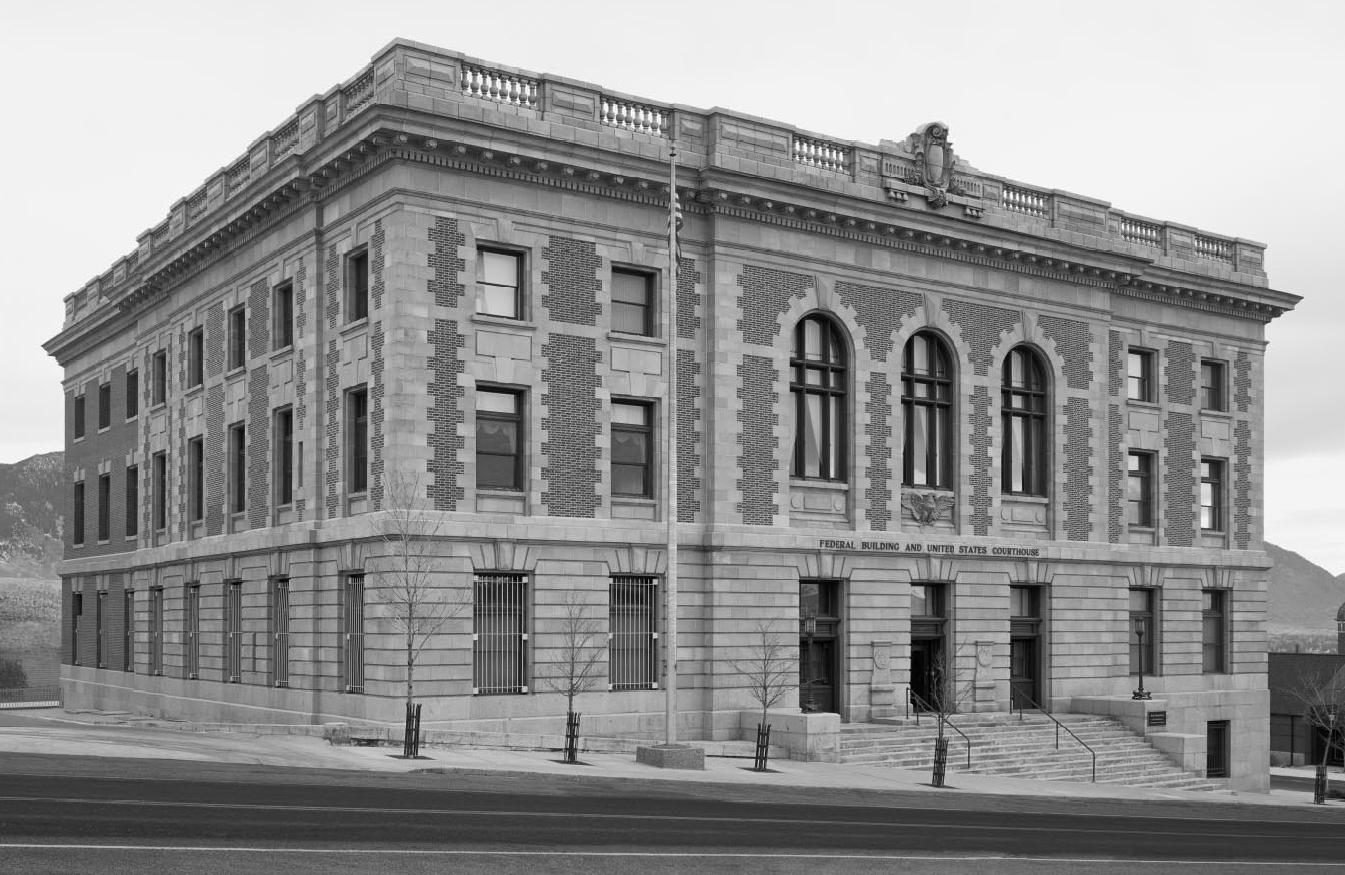
- The Mike Mansfield Federal Building and United States Courthouse in Butte, Montana

- Location within Montana Location within the United States
- Location: 400 N. Main St., Butte, Montana
- Coordinates: 46.0164°N 112.5356°W
- Area: less than one acre
- Built: 1904
- Architects: James Knox Taylor, James Wetmore
- NRHP reference No.: 79001426
- Added to NRHP: November 15, 1979

The Mike Mansfield Federal Building and United States Courthouse is a courthouse of the United States District Court for the District of Montana, located in Butte, Montana. Completed in 1904, the building was expanded from 1932 to 1933.

It was listed in the National Register of Historic Places in 1979 as U. S. Post Office. It has also been known as Federal Building and U.S. Court House. It is a contributing building in the NRHP-listed Butte Historic District.

The building was renamed in 2002 to honor Michael Joseph Mansfield (1903–2001), a U.S. representative and senator.

== Building history ==
The building has a colorful history that spans more than 100 years. By the beginning of the twentieth century, the frontier town of Butte was a vibrant copper-mining center, attracting numerous immigrant groups and becoming a "melting pot" of the frontier. Butte became the site of the government's fourth largest immigration office and consequently needed a federal building.

The building, which was constructed to serve as a combined courthouse and post office, was designed by Supervising Architect of the United States Treasury Department James Knox Taylor, who was noted for designing many post office buildings between 1897 and 1912. The cornerstone of the building was laid in May 1903. The building was constructed for a cost of $300,000, and was dedicated on December 8, 1904. At that time, it was within a block of several mines and dozens of wood frame lodging and commercial buildings. After the building opened, the elaborate courtroom was the site of numerous naturalization ceremonies as thousands of immigrants became citizens.

One of the most dramatic incidents in Butte history occurred in the courtroom on May 21, 1924, during Prohibition, which outlawed the sale, manufacture, or transportation of liquor. John O'Leary, a convicted bootlegger, began shooting a gun wildly about the crowded courtroom before turning it on himself. O'Leary survived, and no one else was injured. One bullet hit the bench, narrowly missing the judge, and a bullet hole in the upper portion of the side rear courtroom door remains.

The Mike Mansfield Federal Building and U.S. Courthouse is located within the Butte National Historic Landmark district, which was designated in 1961. When the National Historic Preservation Act was passed in 1966, the district was also listed in the National Register of Historic Places. In 1979, the building was listed individually in the National Register of Historic Places. The building was renamed to honor Mike Mansfield, one of Montana's most notable and beloved statesmen, in 2002.

== Architecture ==
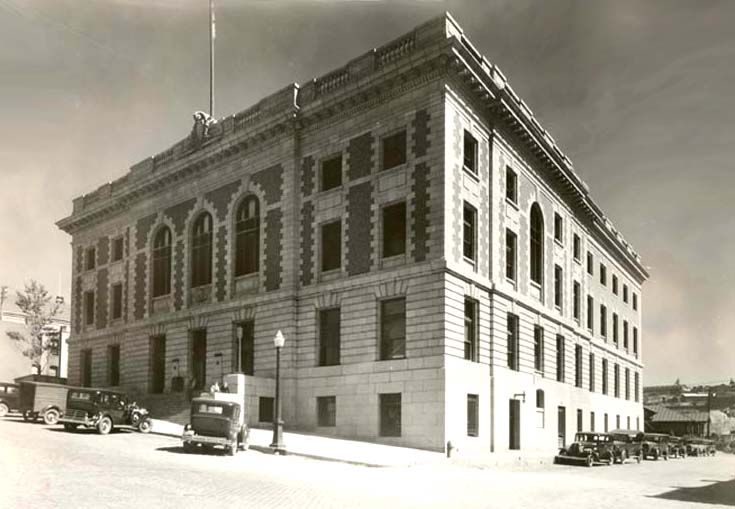
The Mike Mansfield Federal Building and United States Courthouse in 1933.

The building is located within an area that was once the core of Butte's bustling business district and is also close to local mining activity. Early drawings indicate the presence of tunnels and mine shafts on the building site. Architect James Knox Taylor expertly adapted the building design to the sloping terrain.

Constructed between 1903 and 1904, the building is an excellent example of the Renaissance Revival style of architecture, which was popular during the Victorian era. One hallmark of the style that is present on the building is the rusticated first story, which consists of smooth blocks of terra cotta with deep, horizontal grooves between the blocks. Other typical features include the roof balustrade and the use of corner blocks called quoins. The architect chose the Renaissance Revival style to display the government's taste and refinement; the massing and materials lend a sense of permanence to the structure and assert the federal government's presence in Butte. The building was constructed of fireproof materials in accordance with a local ordinance that was passed after a fire in 1879 destroyed numerous wood-frame buildings in the town.

The facade of the Mike Mansfield Federal Building and U.S. Courthouse is arranged symmetrically and has a projecting central pavilion. The facade features exceptionally high-quality materials. The entrance steps and the basement elevations are composed of coursed, cut granite. The first story is faced with pale terra cotta and is topped by a belt course that encircles the building. Bricks on the second and third stories are laid in a pattern called Flemish bond that consists of alternating headers and stretchers. Many of the decorative components of the building are executed in terra cotta and include the quoins, the elaborate entablature that tops the building, the roof balustrade, and the central cartouche (scrolled, oval ornament). An eagle ornament above the main entrance expresses the federal presence in Butte.

The interior of the building also features high-quality materials. The most impressive space is the courtroom, which dominates the second and third stories. The courtroom doors are solid oak, as is the hand-carved judge's bench. Tall windows are topped with round arches and flanked with marble pilasters (attached columns). The vaulted ceiling displays decorative plaster, adding to the stateliness of the space.

The Copper Street lobby, which features marble wainscot, is another important interior space that retains original finishes. An ornate stairway that extends from the basement to the third story is a focal point of the interior. The stairway's treads are rose-colored marble. Terrazzo flooring is found throughout the building, although some areas have been covered with other types of floor covering. Other portions of the interior contain polished white Vermont marble baseboards, wainscot, and pilasters.

The building originally had a U-shaped footprint, but was enlarged in 1932 and 1933. The addition was designed by James A. Wetmore, Acting Supervising Architect of the U.S. Treasury Department at that time. Wetmore's addition respects both the design and materials of the original portion of the building. The addition more than doubled the usable square footage of the building. In 1965, the post office moved out of the building, and the Main Street lobby was altered substantially. Subsequent interior alterations occurred in 1992, when much of the first floor was modernized for new tenants.

== Significant events ==
- 1879: Butte incorporated
- 1903-1904: Federal Building and U.S. Courthouse constructed
- 1932-1933: Building addition constructed
- 1961: Butte National Historic Landmark district designated
- 1965: Post office vacated and Main Street lobby altered
- 1966: Butte historic district listed in the National Register of Historic Places
- 1979: Federal Building and United States Courthouse individually listed in the National Register of Historic Places
- 1992: Interior remodeled
- 2002: Building renamed to honor Montana statesman Mike Mansfield

== Building facts ==
- Location: 400 North Main Street
- Architects: James Knox Taylor; James A. Wetmore
- Construction Dates: 1903-1904 1932–1933
- Landmark Status: Individually listed in National Register of Historic Places
- Located within the Butte National Historic Landmark District and the Butte National Register of Historic Places district
- Architectural Style: Renaissance Revival
- Primary Materials: Granite Terra Cotta Red Brick
- Prominent Features: Formal facade Courtroom with decorative plaster and marble details
