= United States Post Office (Missoula, Montana) =

- U.S. Post Office
- U.S. National Register of Historic Places
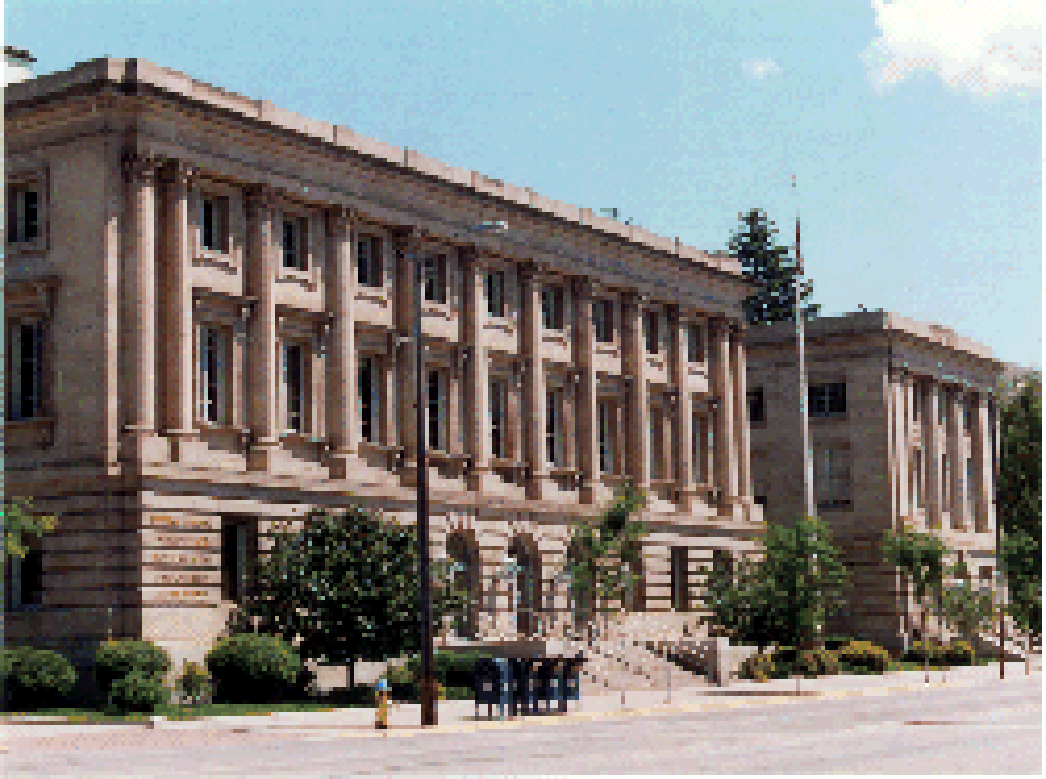
- Federal Building, U.S. Post Office and Courthouse, June 2003

- Location within Montana Location within the United States
- Location: 200 E. Broadway St., Missoula, Montana
- Coordinates: 46°52′18.4″N 113°59′31.8″W
- Area: 1.5 acres (0.61 ha)
- Built: 1913
- Architect: Taylor, James Knox; Wetmore, James
- Architectural style: Italian Renaissance Revival
- NRHP reference No.: 79001406
- Added to NRHP: November 30, 1979

The Federal Building, U.S. Post Office and Courthouse, Missoula, Montana, is a building housing various services of the United States federal government. Built between 1911 and 1913, an expansion initiated in 1927 and completed in 1929 allowed the building to serve thereafter as a courthouse of the United States District Court for the District of Montana. The building was again expanded in the 1930s, and was listed in the National Register of Historic Places in 1979.

== Building history ==
Missoula began as a small village in the 1860s, but grew quickly when it became a hub of the Northern Pacific Railroad in the 1880s. By the start of the 20th century, it was an important regional trading center for western Montana, northern Idaho, and eastern Washington.

Because of the growing population and the subsequent need for services, Missoula was selected as the location for a federal building. In 1907, the government purchased four lots along Cedar Street, which was later renamed Broadway Street, for $19,850. The Supervising Architect of the Treasury, James Knox Taylor, designed the new building, and construction commenced in January 1911. The building opened in 1913, and the original tenants were the U.S. Postal Service and the U.S. Forest Service. The Daily Missoulan called the building "a handsome structure, an ornament to the city."

As Missoula continued to grow, additional space for federal functions was needed. In 1927, James A. Wetmore, acting supervising architect of the U.S. Treasury Department, designed an extension and an annex to the original building to house judicial functions. Construction was completed in 1929, and the building hosted its first session of U.S. District Court on December 5, 1929. Despite the increase in space, the building required another enlargement in the 1930s. Designed by Louis A. Simon of the U.S. Treasury Department, the second annex was dedicated on October 13, 1937.

The building, which has served as the headquarters for the Northern Region of the U.S. Forest Service since 1914, was the location of the investigation into the tragic 1949 fire at Mann Gulch in the Helena National Forest. Thirteen firefighters, who were members of an elite U.S. Forest Service team known as the smokejumpers, died when the blaze blocked their escape route. The 1952 film Red Skies of Montana was based on the Mann Gulch fire, and one of the scenes features the Federal Building, U.S. Post Office and Courthouse.

The majority of postal functions moved out of the building in 1974, but a small post office remains. Numerous federal agencies occupy the building today. The building was listed in the National Register of Historic Places in 1979. The district court now meets in the Russell Smith Courthouse, across the street.

== Architecture ==
The Federal Building, U.S. Post Office and Courthouse is located on a block bounded by Broadway, Pine, and Pattee streets, near the central business area. The original architect, James Knox Taylor, designed the building in the Italian Renaissance Revival style of architecture, which was commonly used for federal building design throughout the country. Its classically inspired design conveyed the dignity of the federal government.

The building is three stories in height and utilizes a steel-frame and reinforced-concrete structural system. Despite the additions of the annexes, the building presents a cohesive appearance because both additions were designed to be compatible with the original building. The foundation is clad in smooth-faced granite, and limestone ashlar covers the principal facade and side elevations. The rear elevation is clad in economical buff-colored brick.

The building displays many character-defining features of the Italian Renaissance Revival style of architecture. Deep ribs in the limestone define the first story. The symmetrical facade features arched entrances. Prominent limestone window surrounds on the second and third stories are another common feature. The upper stories are defined by a series of two-story pilasters (attached columns) that have Corinthian capi-tals with ornate acanthus leaf patterns. A carved ornamental eagle on the 1929 annex conveys the federal significance of the building.

The original building is separated from the 1929 expansion by a narrow connector topped with a glass-enclosed atrium, which the U.S. Forest Service originally used as a greenhouse. A single-story addition housing conference rooms was added in 1952 and is the last enlargement.

The post office lobby, which is part of the original building, retains many historic features and finishes. The floors are covered in gray terrazzo set within a gray marble border. The marble extends up the wall to form wainscot. Above the wainscot, the walls are covered with plaster and feature pilasters similar to those on the exterior. A dentil (rectangular block) course encircles the lobby. The ceiling is covered with painted plaster panels divided by beams. Original bronze pendant light fixtures and sconces illuminate the space. Original oak doors remain.

The 1937 annex lobby also retains many original features. The floor is covered with panels of alternating light and dark marble that are arranged on a 45-degree angle with the lobby walls. The walls are covered with deep beige marble, and each contains a centrally placed arched opening. The walls are trimmed in dark gray marble at the base, while a molded wood cornice with a dentil course tops the space. The plaster ceiling features a decorative circular medallion from which a bronze pendant light descends.

The arched opening on the west leads to an exit that is framed with darkly stained wood and contains a fanlight. Decorative bronze medallions flank the exit. To the east, the arched opening leads to an elevator that has original bronze doors and surrounds.

Although the courtroom is no longer used for judicial purposes, some original features remain since conversion into office space. Original wood and leather doors are in place. Paneled wood wainscot covers the walls and a painted wood cornice tops the room. Three two-story arched windows are symmetrically placed on the north wall of the courtroom. The molded wood surrounds and mullions are original.

== Significant events ==
- 1911–1913: Original building constructed
- 1929: First annex completed
- 1937: Second annex completed
- 1949: Mann Gulch fire investigation
- 1974: Majority of postal functions leave the building
- 1979: Building listed in National Register of Historic Places

== Building facts ==
- Location: 200 East Broadway Street
- Architects: James Knox Taylor; James A. Wetmore; Louis A. Simon
- Construction Dates: 1911–1913; 1927–1929; 1937
- Architectural Style: Italian Renaissance Revival
- Landmark Status: Listed in the National Register of Historic Places
- Primary Materials: Granite and Limestone
- Prominent Features: Classical details; Postal lobby
