= United States Post Office and Courthouse–Billings =

- U.S. National Register of Historic Places

- Location within Montana Location within the United States
- Location: 2602 First Ave. N, Billings, Montana
- Coordinates: 45°46′58″N 108°30′10″W
- Area: 1 acre (0.40 ha)
- Built: 1914; 1932
- Architect: Wenderoth, Oscar; Et al.
- Architectural style: Late 19th And 20th Century Revivals, Second Renaissance Revival
- MPS: US Post Offices in Montana, 1900--1941, TR
- NRHP reference No.: 86000678
- Added to NRHP: March 14, 1986

The U.S. Post Office and Courthouse–Billings, in Billings, Montana, was built in 1914. It was listed on the National Register of Historic Places in 1986.

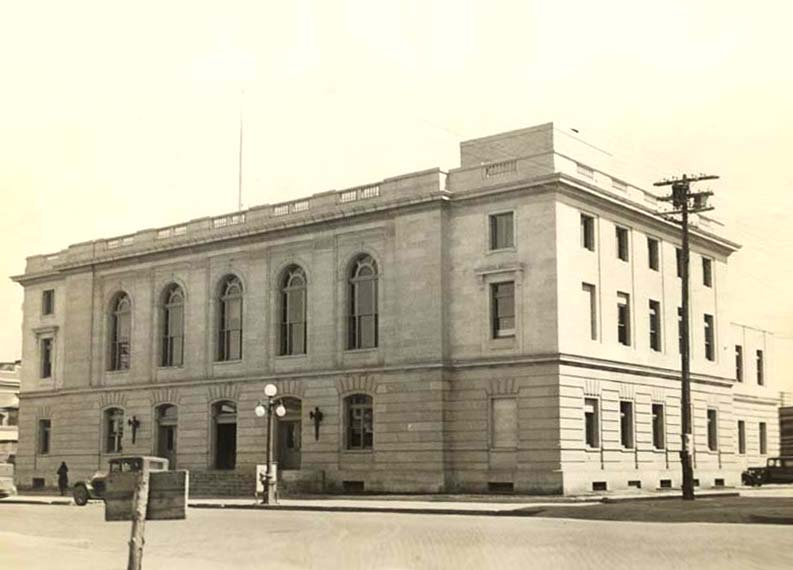
C. 1914

It includes Late 19th and 20th Century Revivals architecture and Second Renaissance Revival architecture. Also known as Billings Post Office and Courthouse and as Billings Downtown Station, it served historically as a courthouse of the United States District Court for the District of Montana, and as a post office. The courthouse functions were later relocated to the James F. Battin Federal Building.

The building's construction was touted as a great thing for Billings, and its opening was a matter of great pride for the city. The building was expanded and renovated in 1932.
