= United States Post Office and Courthouse–Glasgow Main =

- US Post Office and Courthouse--Glasgow Main
- U.S. National Register of Historic Places
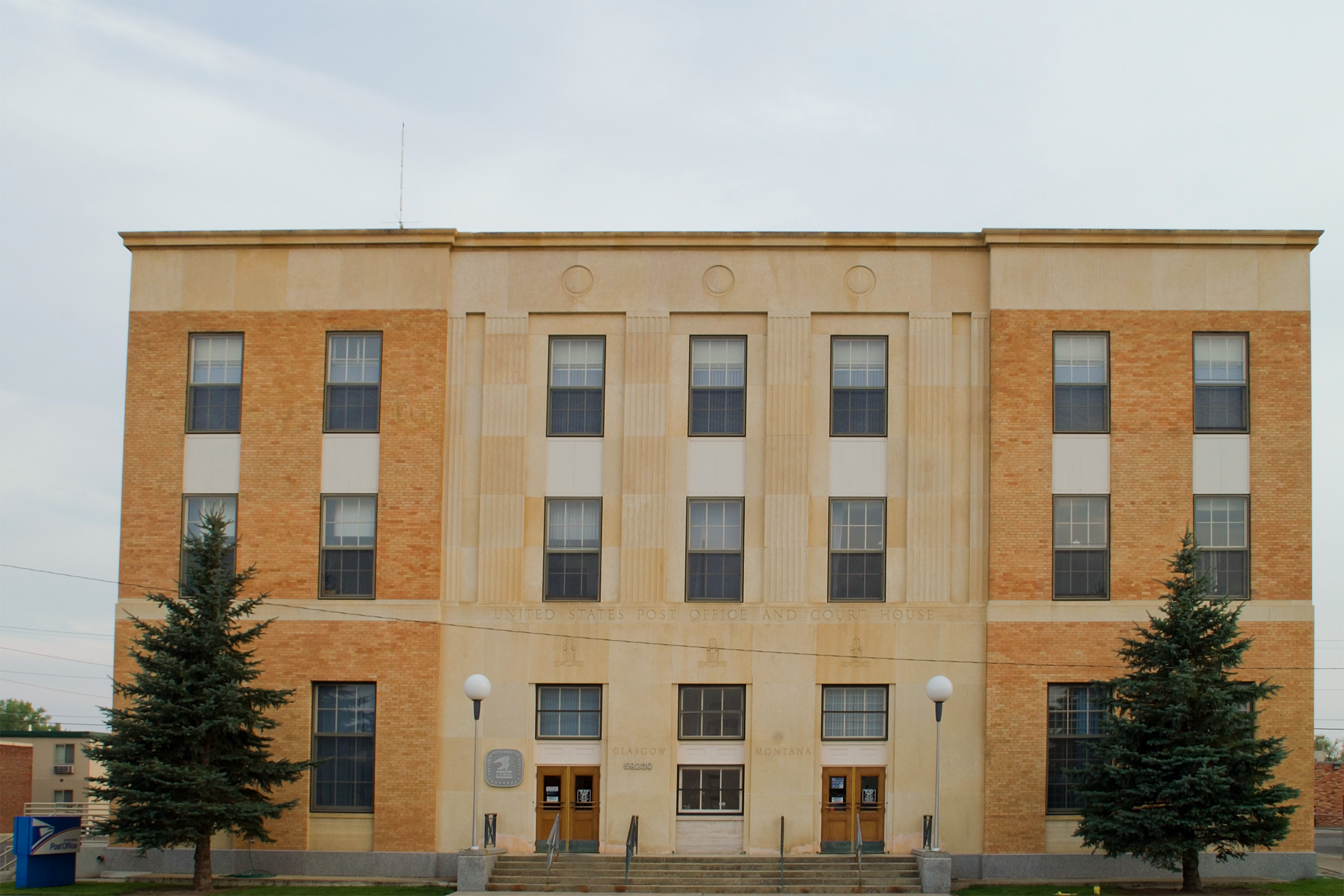

- Location within Montana Location within the United States
- Location: 605 Second Ave. S, Glasgow, Montana
- Coordinates: 48°11′40″N 106°38′18″W
- Area: 0.4 acres (0.16 ha)
- Built: 1939
- Architect: Simon, Louis A.
- Architectural style: Starved Classicism
- MPS: US Post Offices in Montana, 1900--1941, TR
- NRHP reference No.: 86000679
- Added to NRHP: March 21, 1986

The U.S. Post Office and Courthouse–Glasgow Main in Glasgow, Montana was built in 1939. Also known as Glasgow Post Office and Courthouse and as Glasgow Main Post Office, it was designed by Louis A. Simon in Starved Classicism style. It served historically as a courthouse and as a post office. It was listed on the National Register of Historic Places in 1986.

It includes a 6 feet (1.8 m) by 14 feet (4.3 m) mural by Forrest Hill (b. 1909) painted in 1942 for $1,250.
