= United States Post Office and Courthouse–Havre Main =

- U.S. Post Office and Courthouse—Havre Main
- U.S. National Register of Historic Places
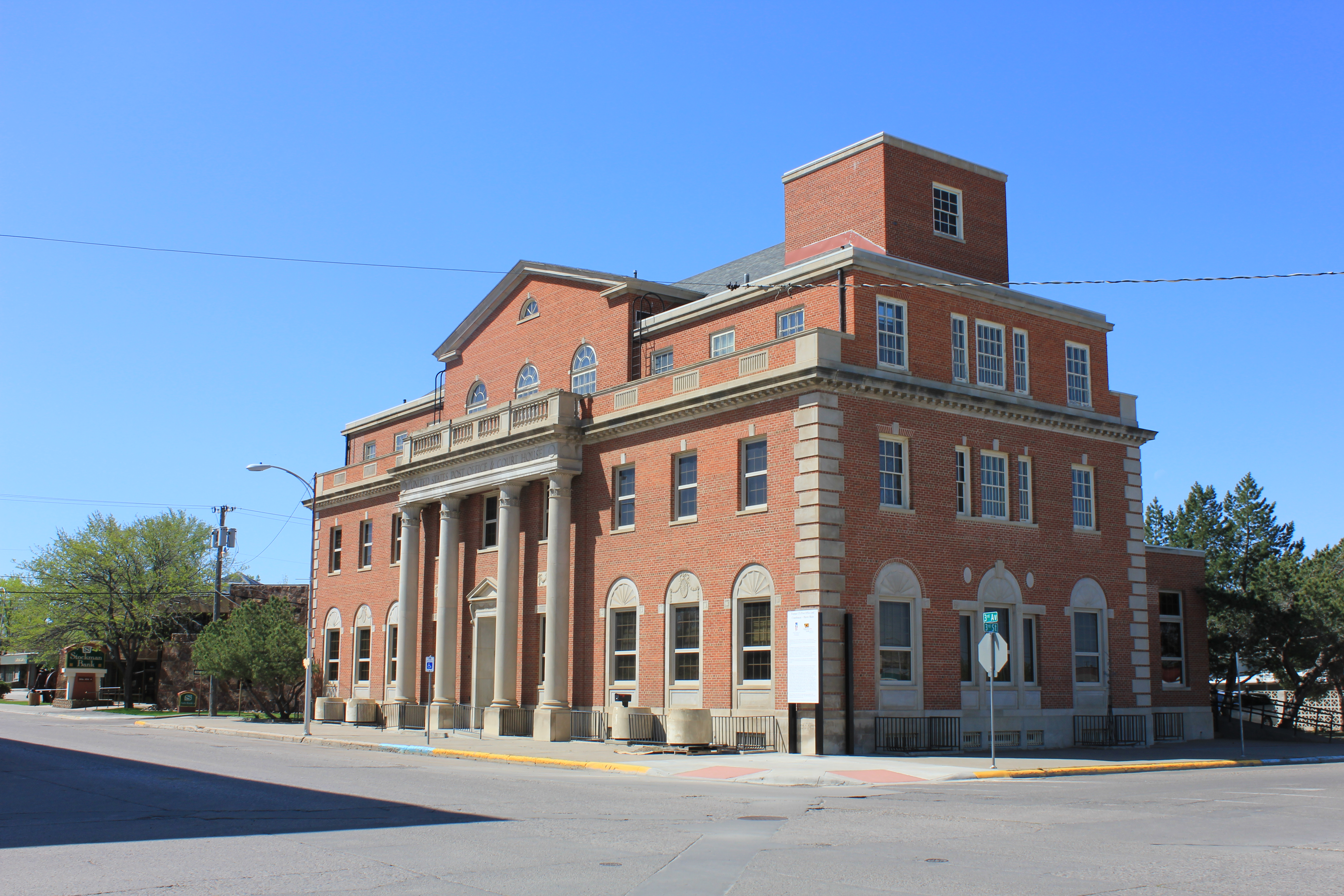

- Location within Montana Location within the United States
- Location: 306 Third Ave., Havre, Montana
- Coordinates: 48°33′5″N 109°40′42″W
- Area: 0.6 acres (0.24 ha)
- Built: 1932
- Architect: Office of the Supervising Architect under James A. Wetmore
- Architectural style: Classical Revival
- MPS: US Post Offices in Montana, 1900--1941, TR
- NRHP reference No.: 86000682
- Added to NRHP: March 14, 1986

The U.S. Post Office and Courthouse–Havre Main, located in Havre, Montana, was designed by the Office of the Supervising Architect under James A. Wetmore in Classical Revival style and was built in 1932. Also known as Havre Post Office and Courthouse or Havre Main Post Office, it served historically as a courthouse and as a post office. It was listed on the National Register of Historic Places in 1986.

As of 2015, it was purchased by a local family to be their place of residence and is undergoing extensive restoration.

Its construction in 1932 was a major local happening, symbolizing assistance of the national government to the local area during the Depression.
