= Grand Island United States Post Office and Courthouse =

Historic federal building in Grand Island, Nebraska

- U.S. National Register of Historic Places
- Federal Building

- Location within Nebraska Location within the United States
- Location: 203 W. Second St., Grand Island, Nebraska
- Coordinates: 40°55′27″N 98°20′25″W
- Area: less than one acre
- Built: 1908
- Architect: John Knox Taylor
- Architectural style: Classical Revival
- NRHP reference No.: 06000044
- Added to NRHP: February 14, 2006

The Federal Building, Grand Island, Nebraska is a historic post office, federal office and courthouse building located at Grand Island in Hall County, Nebraska. It is no longer used as a courthouse for the United States District Court for the District of Nebraska.

== Building history ==
In 1859, just two years after they founded Grand Island, Nebraska, German settlers established the community's first post office. For many years, however, the post office shared space with various commercial establishments. When Congressman George W. Norris secured funding for a new post office building during the early years of the 20th century, Grand Island was one of the last major cities in Nebraska to lack this important type of public building.

Supervising Architect of the Treasury James Knox Taylor designed the new post office and federal building in Grand Island, authorizing the final architectural plans in 1908. Workers completed the building, which officially opened on November 26, 1910, at a cost of $108,000. By this time, Grand Island was the third largest city in Nebraska and its economy was thriving.

Postal facilities occupied the first floor of the new building, while the second floor held a two-story district courtroom and associated court offices. As its population increased, Grand Island required expanded postal services and additional federal office space. In 1933, local architect Charles W. Steinbaugh designed an addition to the building, which opened in 1935. Two years later, the post office began housing the headquarters for Grand Island's Works Progress Administration (WPA) district office, a function that it served until 1939.

In 1968, the U.S. Postal Service vacated the building after securing a new facility. The same year, the U.S. General Services Administration purchased the building and renovated the first floor into office space for federal agencies. Current tenants include the FBI, Bureau of Reclamation, and U.S. Fish and Wildlife Service.

The Federal Building is located in downtown Grand Island, close to the county courthouse and various retail establishments and residential buildings. The Grand Island Federal Building was listed in the National Register of Historic Places in 2006 to recognize its architectural significance and contribution to community development.

== Architecture ==
The Grand Island Federal Building is a visually restrained but striking local landmark, occupying the southwest corner of the intersection of West Second and North Locust streets. Supervising Architect of the Treasury James Knox Taylor preferred classically inspired styles, deeming them appropriately dignified for public architecture. The Federal Building is an example of the Neoclassical architectural style, exhibiting design components derived from Greek, Roman, and Renaissance traditions. Taylor also supported the use of high-quality building materials, ensuring that the buildings constructed under his tenure would have lasting presences in their towns and cities.

The two-story Federal Building faces north onto Second Street. It is constructed of buff-colored brick, some of which is laid in decorative herringbone patterns, with limestone trim. The original portion of the building, which is constructed on a limestone foundation, is symmetrical, with the 1935 addition extending to the west. The central block projects slightly, articulating the entrance, which is reached by a small flight of stairs. A large wood door with carved medallions and inset metal grilles is centered in the central block. The first story features three round-arch openings that contain cast-iron frames and transoms with decorative circular, oval, and floral patterns. The arched openings are topped with scrolled limestone keystones flanked by circular medallions. Vertically aligned with the arches on the second story of the facade, three central windows feature small balconets with cast-iron balustrades. The bays are divided by two-story pilasters with stylized capitals. The pilasters support a classical entablature that features an architrave, frieze, and cornice with a dentil course. On the original portion of the building, other openings are rectangular and topped by flat arches with limestone keystones. A roofline brick parapet wall with limestone coping and pedestals is on the original portion of the building. A secondary entrance, located on the east elevation, features a limestone surround with a decorative lintel carved with a foliated motif. An original cast-iron light fixture with replacement globe extends from the lintel. The rear elevation contains an original U-shaped light court. The chimney, clad in brick and topped with a limestone cap, extends from the southeastern corner of the low-pitched hipped roof, which is covered with standing-seam metal. The 1935 addition is constructed of buff-colored brick, but lacks the original structure's decorative classical details.

The postal lobby once spanned the length of the facade on the first floor. Although the postal lobby features have been removed, original materials remain. These finishes include the terrazzo and marble floor, and marble and plaster walls. Round-arch openings with wood frames and a vaulted ceiling with original pendant chandeliers dominate the space. An original staircase with dark green marble risers and pink marble treads at the east end of the lobby provides access to the second floor. An ornate cast-iron lamp post atop a marble pedestal and surmounted by a spherical globe is located adjacent to the staircase. On the second floor, the two-story courtroom has been subdivided, but the corridors retain original materials, including terrazzo and marble flooring, plaster walls, and wood doors and frames.

Over the course of the building's history, it has undergone periodic upgrades and renovations, not always in keeping with the structure's historic character. In 1979 and 1980, original wood-sash windows were replaced with aluminum windows; however, the windows' original dimensions remain intact. Recently, GSA corrected some prior work that altered historic features. Most notably, the agency removed an inappropriate aluminum door from the Locust Street elevation and installed a replica of the original door.

== History ==
- 1908 Construction begins
- 1910 Construction completed and building occupied
- 1933-1935 Addition constructed
- 1968 Post office relocates; GSA purchases building and begins renovation
- 1979-1980 Original wood-sash windows replaced
- 2006 Building listed in the National Register of Historic Places

== Building facts ==
- Location: 203 West Second Street
- Architects: James Knox Taylor; Charles W. Steinbaugh
- Construction Dates: 1908-1910; 1933–1935
- Architectural Style: Neoclassical
- Landmark Status: Listed in the National Register of Historic Places
- Primary Materials: Buff-colored Brick; Limestone
- Prominent Features: Arched Openings with Ornate Limestone Keystones; Original Lobby with Historic Finishes
