= United States Post Office and Courthouse–Great Falls =

- U.S. Post Office and Courthouse—Great Falls
- U.S. National Register of Historic Places
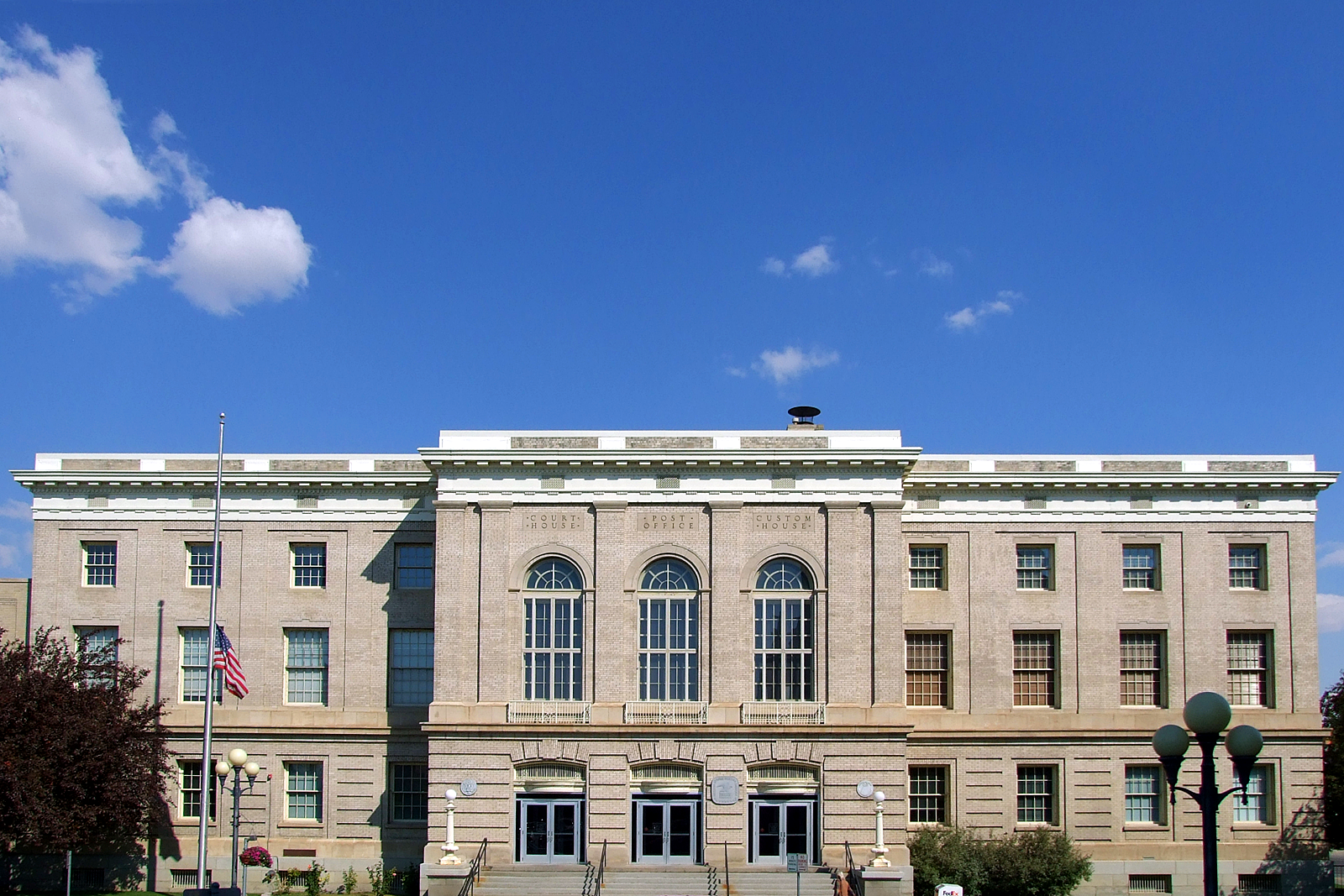

- Location within Montana Location within the United States
- Location: 215 First Ave. N, Great Falls, Montana
- Coordinates: 47°30′24″N 111°18′11″W
- Area: 1.9 acres (0.77 ha)
- Built: 1912; 1937; 1967-68
- Architect: James Knox Taylor
- Architectural style: Late 19th and 20th Century Revivals, Second Renaissance Revival
- MPS: US Post Offices in Montana, 1900--1941, TR
- NRHP reference No.: 86000681
- Added to NRHP: March 14, 1986

The U.S. Post Office and Courthouse–Great Falls, also known as Great Falls Post Office and Courthouse, in Great Falls, Montana, is a three-story building constructed in 1912. It was expanded by a two-story addition in 1937 and further expanded in 1967–68.

It was designed by James Knox Taylor and reflects Late 19th and 20th Century Revivals architecture and Second Renaissance Revival architecture. It served historically as a courthouse and as a post office, and it was listed on the National Register of Historic Places in 1986.

It was deemed to be "an outstanding example of early Twentieth Century federal architecture in the Second Renaissance Revival mode" and it was asserted that it "symbolizes the early growth of the city and the federal government's recognition of city's importance as a regional center."
