= Meadly House =

Historic house in Iowa, United States

- U.S. National Register of Historic Places
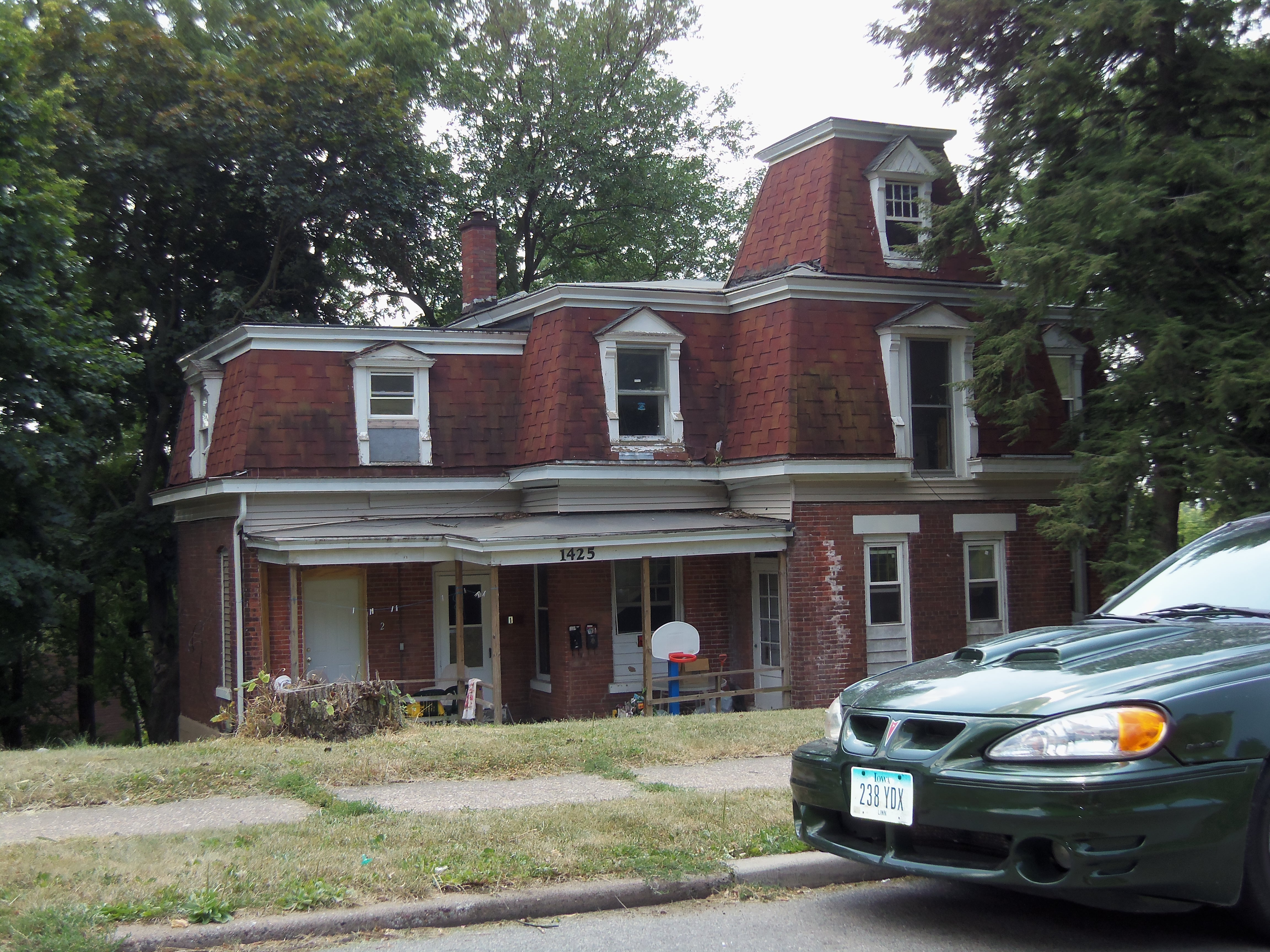

- Location within Iowa Location within the United States
- Location: 1425 W. 10th St. Davenport, Iowa
- Coordinates: 41°31′41″N 90°36′9″W
- Area: less than one acre
- Built: 1881
- Architectural style: Second Empire
- MPS: Davenport MRA
- NRHP reference No.: 84001476
- Added to NRHP: July 27, 1984

The Meadly House is a historic building located in the West End of Davenport, Iowa, United States. The Second Empire structure was built in 1881 for the Meadly family. Elizabeth Meadly was listed the longest at this residence. Four other people, possibly boarders or renters, were listed at this address by 1900. This house, and the nearby Albert Kiene House, are unique in that they are single story, brick residences with a high pitched Mansard roof that features prominent gabled dormers. The roughly cross-shaped house also has a small Mansard superimposed on the projecting pavilion, and a porch in the northeast reentrant angle. It originally had Eastlake details. The house has been listed on the National Register of Historic Places since 1984.
