= Joseph P. Mentzer House =

Historic house in Iowa, United States

- U.S. National Register of Historic Places
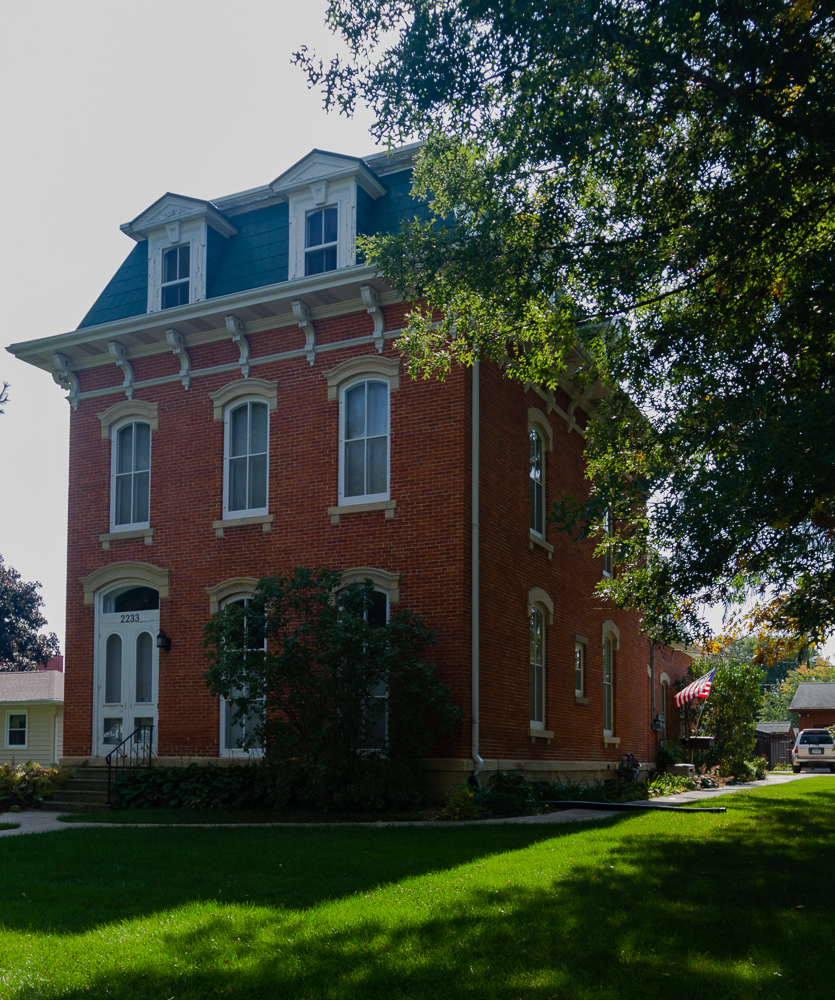

- Location within Iowa Location within the United States
- Location: 2233 3rd Ave., Marion, Iowa
- Coordinates: 42°01′46.9″N 91°35′19.1″W
- Area: less than one acre
- Built: 1868
- Architectural style: Second Empire
- NRHP reference No.: 82002629
- Added to NRHP: September 14, 2002

The Joseph P. Mentzer House is a historic building located in Marion, Iowa, United States. An Ohio native, Mentzer made his fortune as a merchant and as a banker in Marion. After his business partnership dissolved in 1865, he turned his attention to a 170-acre (69 ha) farm he bought on the edge of town. He built this 2½-story Second Empire house in 1868. It features a mansard roof with bracketed eaves and a single-story rear wing. The house remained in the Mentzer family into the 1930s. At one point it had been converted into three apartments. It was listed on the National Register of Historic Places in 1982.
