= Albert Kiene House =

Historic house in Iowa, United States

- U.S. National Register of Historic Places
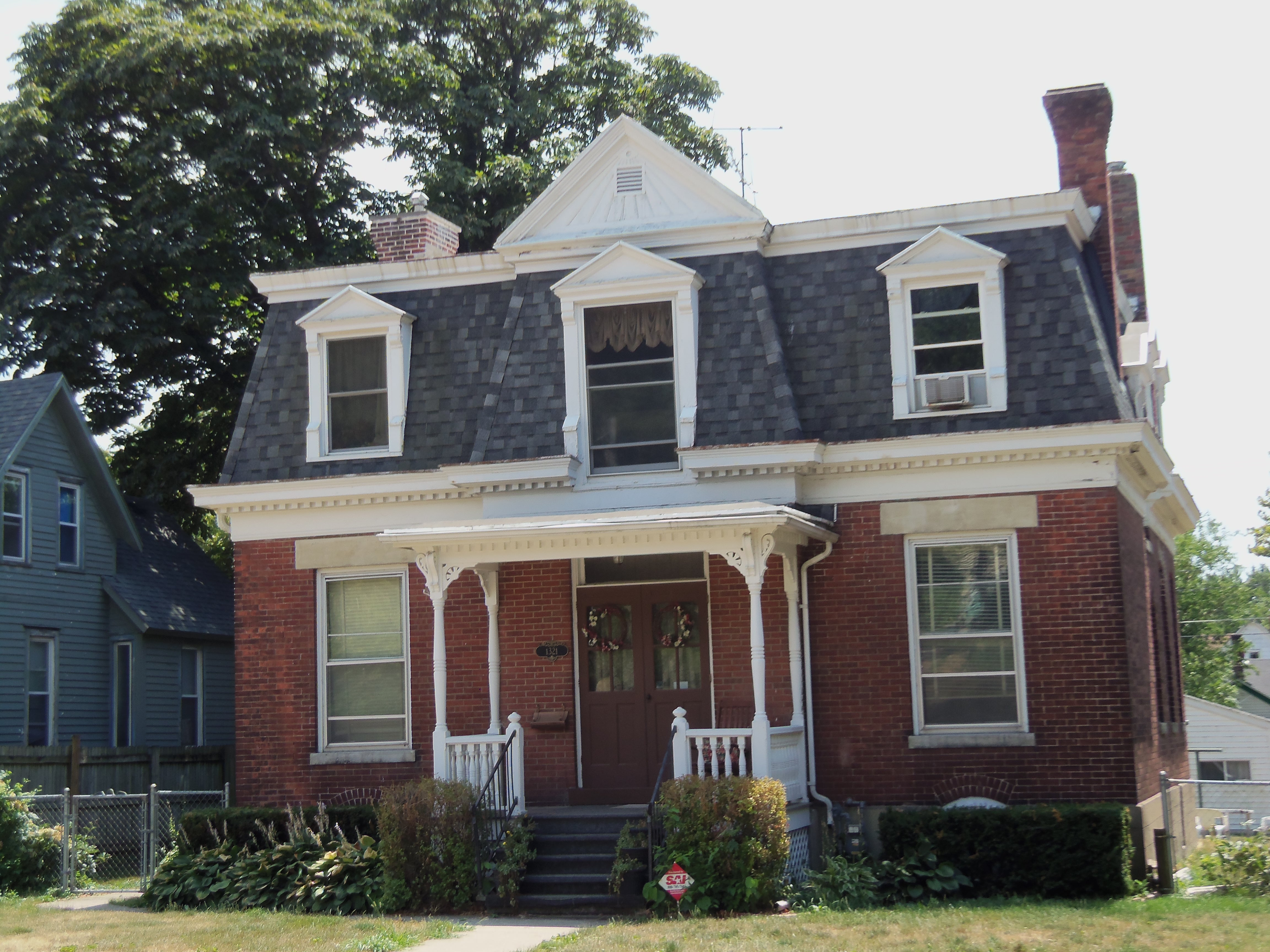

- Location within Iowa Location within the United States
- Location: 1321 W. 8th St. Davenport, Iowa
- Coordinates: 41°31′39″N 90°35′36″W
- Area: less than one acre
- Built: 1881
- Architectural style: Second Empire
- MPS: Davenport MRA
- NRHP reference No.: 84001450
- Added to NRHP: July 27, 1984

The Albert Kiene House is a historic building located in the West End of Davenport, Iowa, United States. Albert Kiene was the first person to live in this Second Empire style residence. He worked for the Ferdinand Haak Company, a prominent local cigar manufacturer. This house, and the nearby Meadly House, are unusual because they are single story, brick residences with a high pitched Mansard roof that features prominent gabled dormers. The house also features a three-bay symmetrical front and a projecting entrance pavilion with a small Eastlake porch. The double-door main entrance has a transom. It has been listed on the National Register of Historic Places since 1984.
