= Wisteria Lodge =

Wisteria Lodge may refer to:

- Wisteria Lodge (Reading, Massachusetts), a historic house
- "The Adventure of Wisteria Lodge", a Sherlock Holmes story
