= Larrabee's Brick Block =

- U.S. National Register of Historic Places
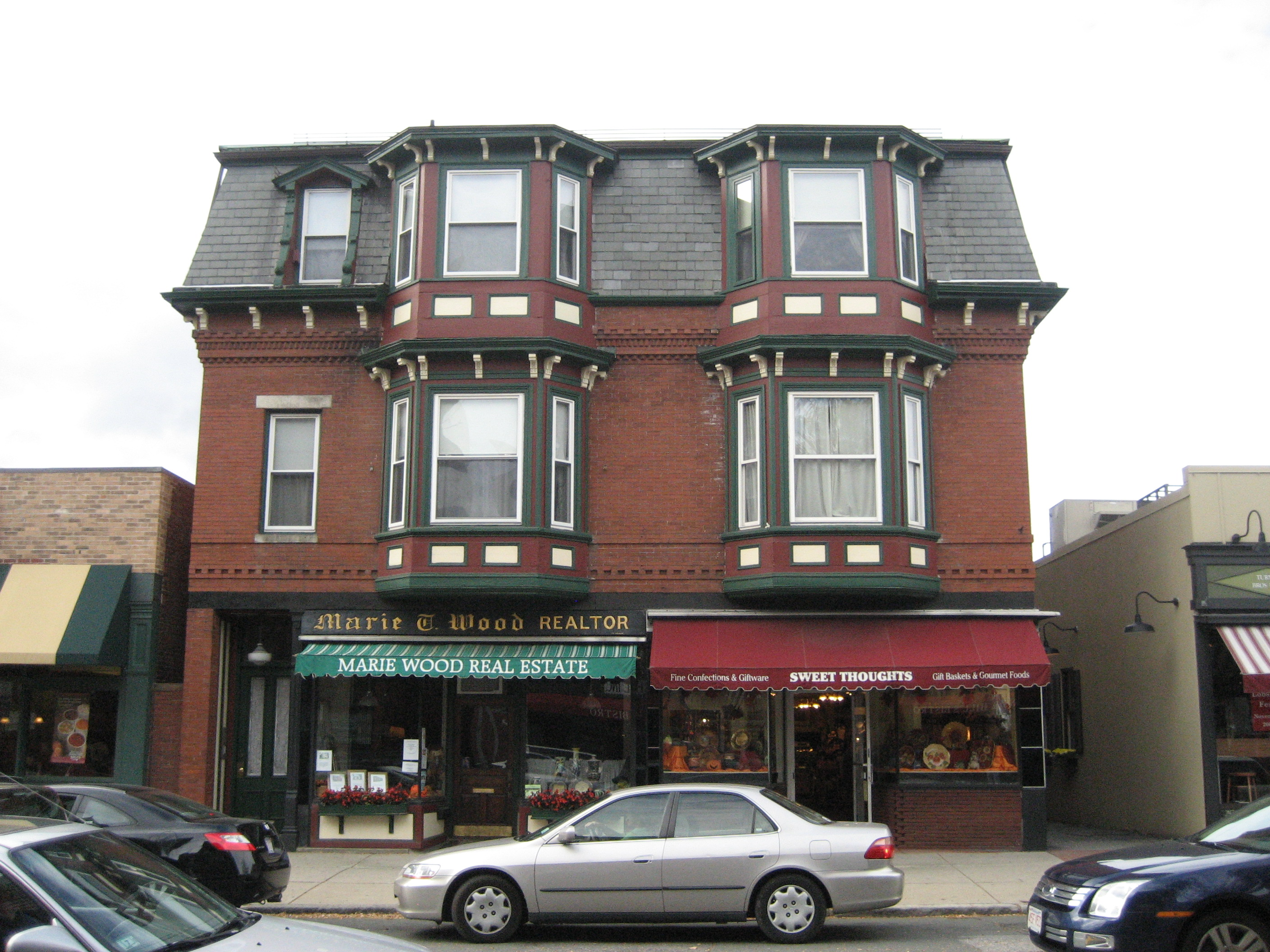

- Location within Massachusetts Location within the United States
- Location: Melrose, Massachusetts
- Coordinates: 42°27′20″N 71°3′57″W
- Built: 1880
- Architect: John Eaton
- NRHP reference No.: 84002729
- Added to NRHP: March 29, 1984

Larrabee's Brick Block is a historic commercial and residential building at 500–504 Main Street in Melrose, Massachusetts. It is one of only two relatively unaltered 19th century commercial buildings in Melrose. The three-story brick Second Empire building was built in 1880 by John Larrabee, on the site of a wood frame meeting hall. The block is built of brick laid in stretcher bond, and its third floor is under a mansard roof typical of the style. The ground floor consists of two storefronts with recessed entrances and plate glass windows, and a separate recessed entrance giving access to the upper residential floors. The second floor facade has two projecting bay windows, decorated with brackets and panel trim, above the two store fronts, and a sash window above the residential entrance. The mansard roof originally had single window dormers, but c. 1910, all but one of these (the one above the residential entrance) were removed and replaced by extensions of the second story bay windows.

The north elevation is also decorated with some elaboration, even though it faces a narrow passage. Windows on the second floor are topped by segmented arches and brick corbelled hoods, and the mansard roof is pierced by six dormers similar in style to the original one on the front. Windows on the south elevation are more simply styled, having only segmented arch lintels, and the cornice becomes simpler towards the rear of the building. The back elevation is also simply decorated, and is mostly obscured by a c. 1930s vernacular three-tier porch.

The interior of the building has also retained most of its original finishes. The ground floor shops have tin ceilings and walls, and original maple flooring, and the upper residential units retain much of the original woodwork, including fireplace mantels, wainscoting, and molded door and window surrounds.

The building was listed on the National Register of Historic Places in 1984.

== See also ==
- National Register of Historic Places listings in Middlesex County, Massachusetts
