= Abner L. Harris House =

Historic house in Wisconsin, United States

- U.S. National Register of Historic Places
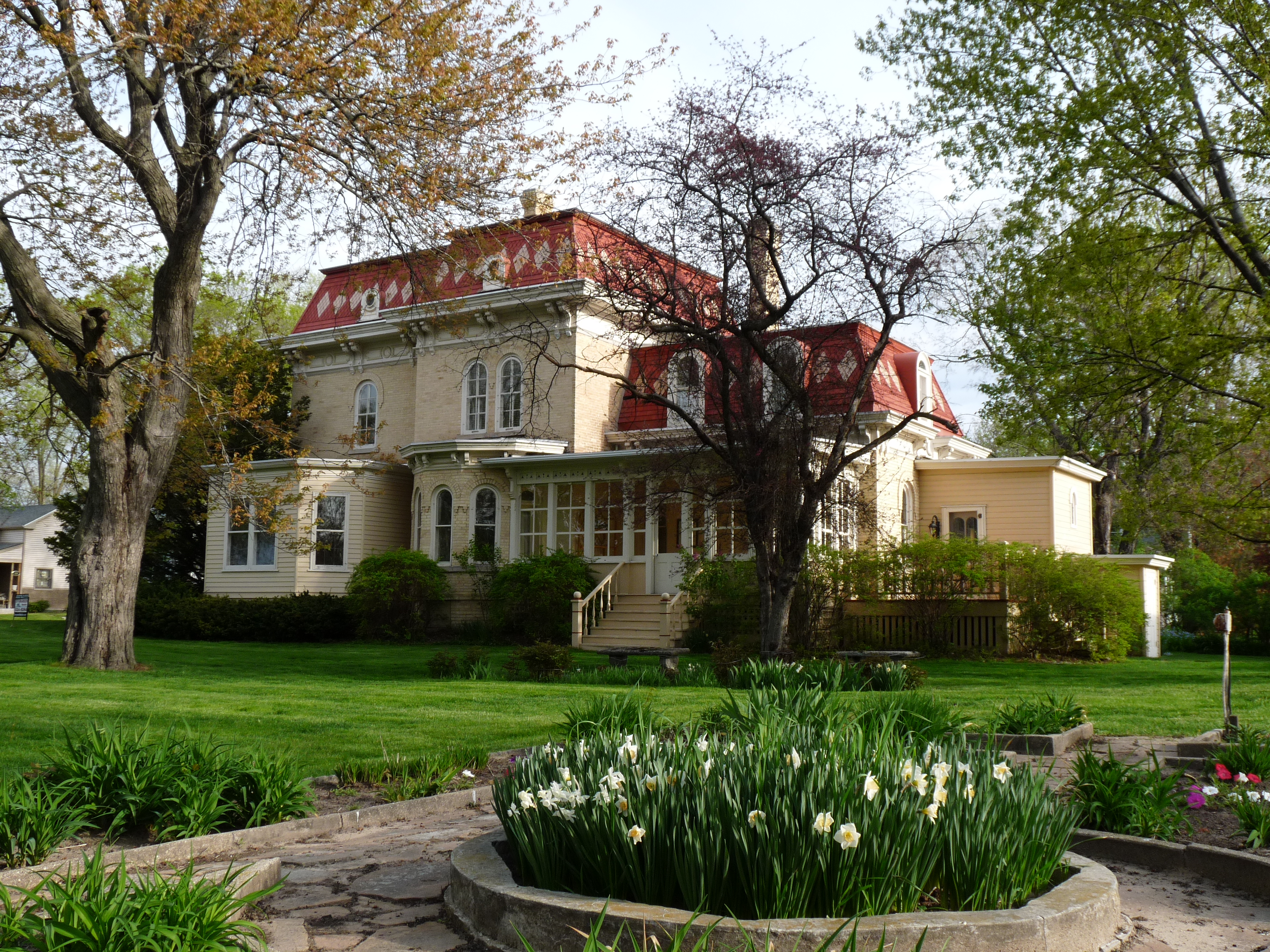
- Abner L. Harris House

- Location within Wisconsin
- Location: 226 N. Pine St., Reedsburg, Wisconsin
- Coordinates: 43°31′58″N 90°00′13″W
- Area: less than one acre
- Built: 1873
- Built by: William Dierks
- Architectural style: Second Empire
- MPS: Reedsburg MRA
- NRHP reference No.: 84000649
- Added to NRHP: December 26, 1984

The Abner L. Harris House is a historic house at 226 N. Pine Street in Reedsburg, Wisconsin.

== History ==
The two-story house was built circa 1873 by carpenter William Dierks. Dierks gave the house a Second Empire design featuring a front porch supported by classical columns, multiple bay windows, a sunroom in the rear, a bracketed cornice, and a mansard roof with small arched dormers. Longtime owner Abner L. Harris bought the house in 1874. Harris served as both mayor and postmaster of Reedsburg, operated a large general store, and funded or was a partner in many of Reedsburg's early commercial and industrial endeavors. After Harris died in 1908, Mary Meyer Rudd and her descendants lived in the house for several decades.

The house was listed on the National Register of Historic Places in 1984 and on the State Register of Historic Places in 1989.
