= Jens Naeset House =

Historic house in Wisconsin, United States

- U.S. National Register of Historic Places
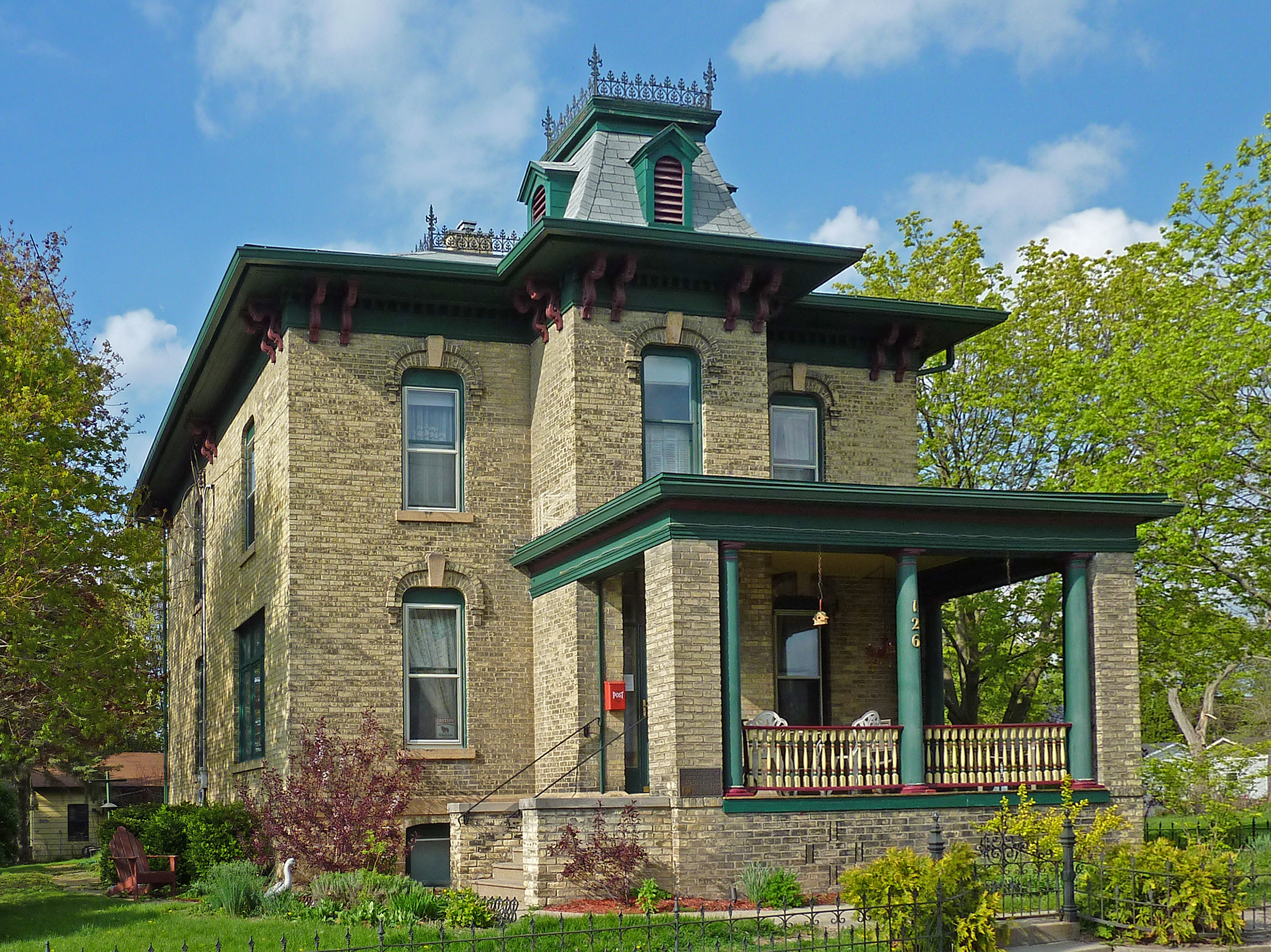
- Jens Naeset House
- Location: 126 E. Washington, Stoughton, Wisconsin
- Coordinates: 42°55′04″N 89°13′09″W
- Area: 0.3 acres (0.12 ha)
- Built: 1878
- Architect: Jens Naeset
- Architectural style: Second Empire, Italianate
- NRHP reference No.: 85000577
- Added to NRHP: March 14, 1985

The Jens Naeset House is an Italianate/Second Empire house built in 1878 in Stoughton, Wisconsin by Norwegian immigrant builder Naeset for his own family. In 1985 it was listed on the National Register of Historic Places.

== History ==
Jens Naeset was born in 1828 in Norway and emigrated from Vik in 1845. The family farmed in Christiana township until 1857. Then he began to work as builder and eventually as a contractor and architect. Notable among his projects was a stone church in East Koshkonong in 1858 and the tower on the old Liberty Prairie church. When Luther College in Decorah was established, he was one of five on the building committee, and he supervised construction of the south wing of Luther's Main Building in 1874. He was involved from 1874 to 1878 in building Christ Lutheran Church on E. Main St. He also served on the Church Council of the Norwegian Lutheran Church of America starting in 1863, and on the Board of Trustees of Luther College starting in 1865.

In 1878, Naeset designed and built the stylish house that is the subject of this article for his wife Gjertrud and family. It is two stories, with cream brick walls on a cut stone foundation. The general footprint is rectangular, with a two-story tower centered at the front. The tower is topped with a curved mansard roof topped with wrought iron cresting and the main house has a similarly shaped roof. The broad eaves are supported by paired brackets. Windows are topped with hood moulds. A one-story bay window hangs on one side, with a tiny balcony on top. A rectangular front porch is supported by simple columns. The general style is Italianate - particularly those double brackets - but the mansard roof and cresting are Second Empire flourishes. Inside, a parlor and sitting room have carved molding around the ceiling. The dining room has a built-in hutch. Bedrooms are upstairs.

After Jens died in 1909, Gjertrud continued to live in the house. In 1914 a granddaughter Gaea Melaas Roe and her husband Gustave Roe moved in with Gjertrud. Gjertrud died in 1919. Gustave was involved in the first auto dealership in Stoughton, selling Overland and Willys-Knight cars. He also co-owned the Badger Theater in Stoughton, and was a civic leader. The Roes lived in the house until the 1970s. After they died, their son Ingolf lived in the house, and his widow Lois Roe Kvamme lived there as of 1985.
