= Wisteria Lodge (Reading, Massachusetts) =

Historic house in Massachusetts, United States

- U.S. National Register of Historic Places
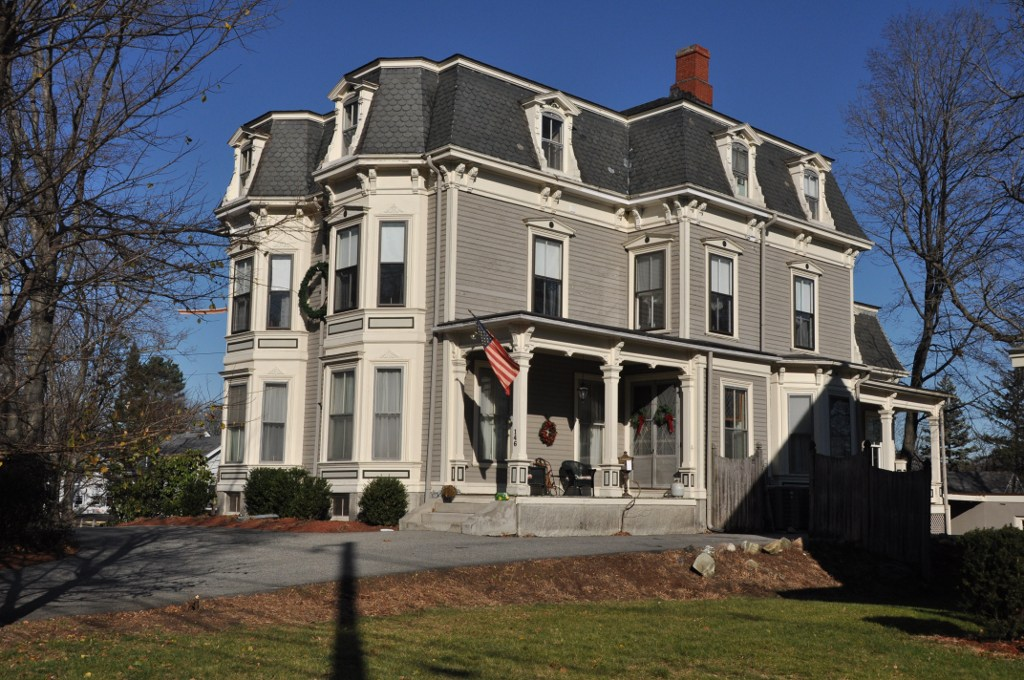

- Location within Massachusetts Location within the United States
- Location: 146 Summer Avenue, Reading, Massachusetts
- Coordinates: 42°31′25.05″N 71°7′5.89″W
- Built: 1850
- Architectural style: Second Empire
- MPS: Reading MRA
- NRHP reference No.: 84002857
- Added to NRHP: July 19, 1984

Wisteria Lodge is a historic house in Reading, Massachusetts. The 2 1/2-story Second Empire wood-frame house was built in 1850 by Oscar Foote, a local real estate developer entrepreneur who attempted to market bottled mineral water from nearby springs. The house has a mansard roof with fish scale slate shingles, bracketed eaves, an elaborate porte cochere, and styled window surrounds with triangular pediments. The porches and porte cochere are supported by square columns set on paneled piers, with arched molding between.

The house was listed on the National Register of Historic Places in 1984.

== See also ==
- National Register of Historic Places listings in Reading, Massachusetts
- National Register of Historic Places listings in Middlesex County, Massachusetts
