= South Willard Street Historic District =

Historic district in Vermont, United States

- U.S. National Register of Historic Places
- U.S. Historic district
- Location within Vermont Location within the United States
- Location: S. Willard St., Burlington, Vermont
- Coordinates: 44°28′21″N 73°12′23″W
- Area: 67 acres (27 ha)
- Architect: Fisher, A. B.; Et al.
- Architectural style: Late 19th And 20th Century Revivals, Late Victorian, Greek Revival
- NRHP reference No.: 88002226
- Added to NRHP: November 3, 1988

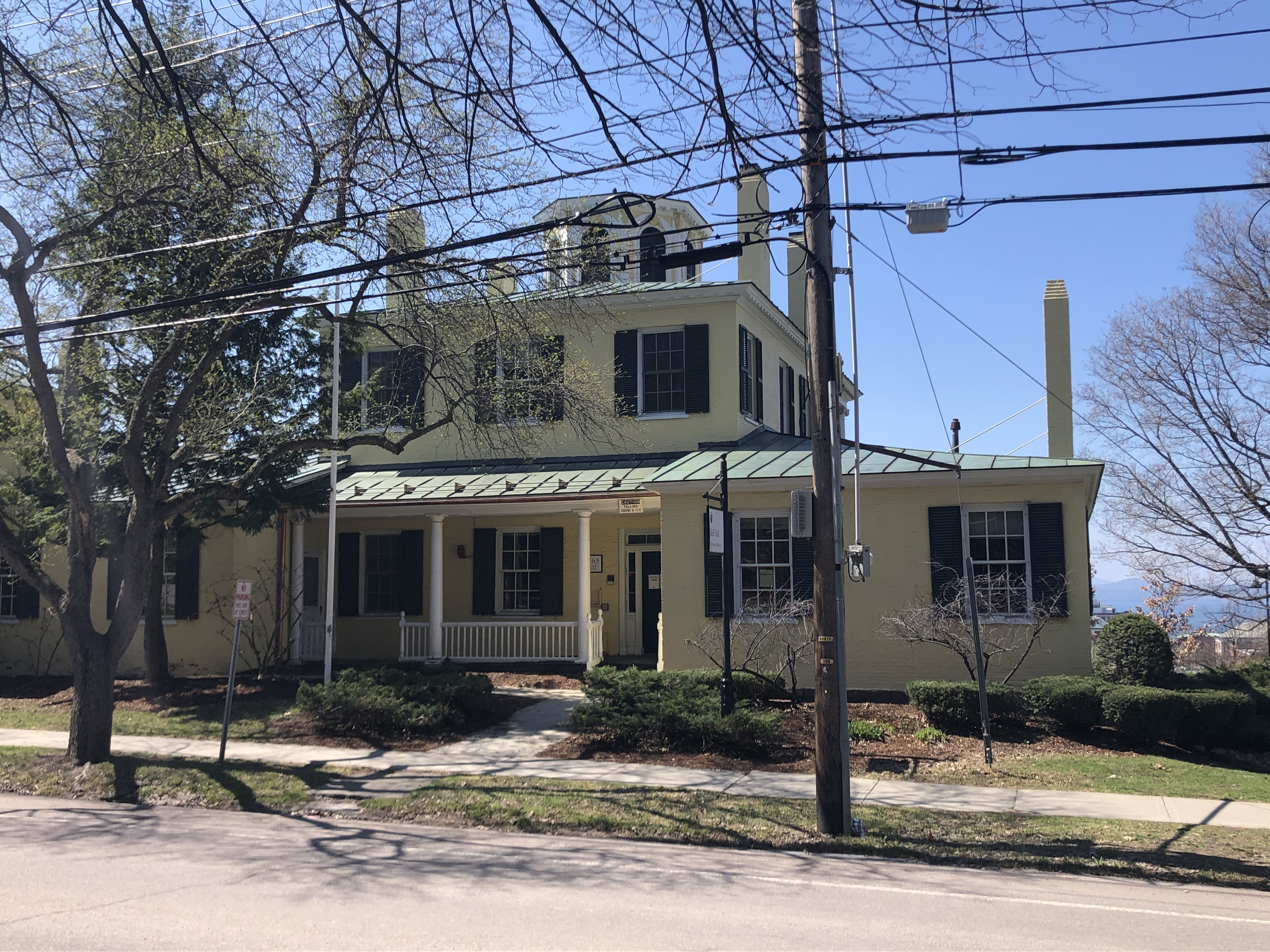
163 South Willard St. Skiff Hall, Champlain College.

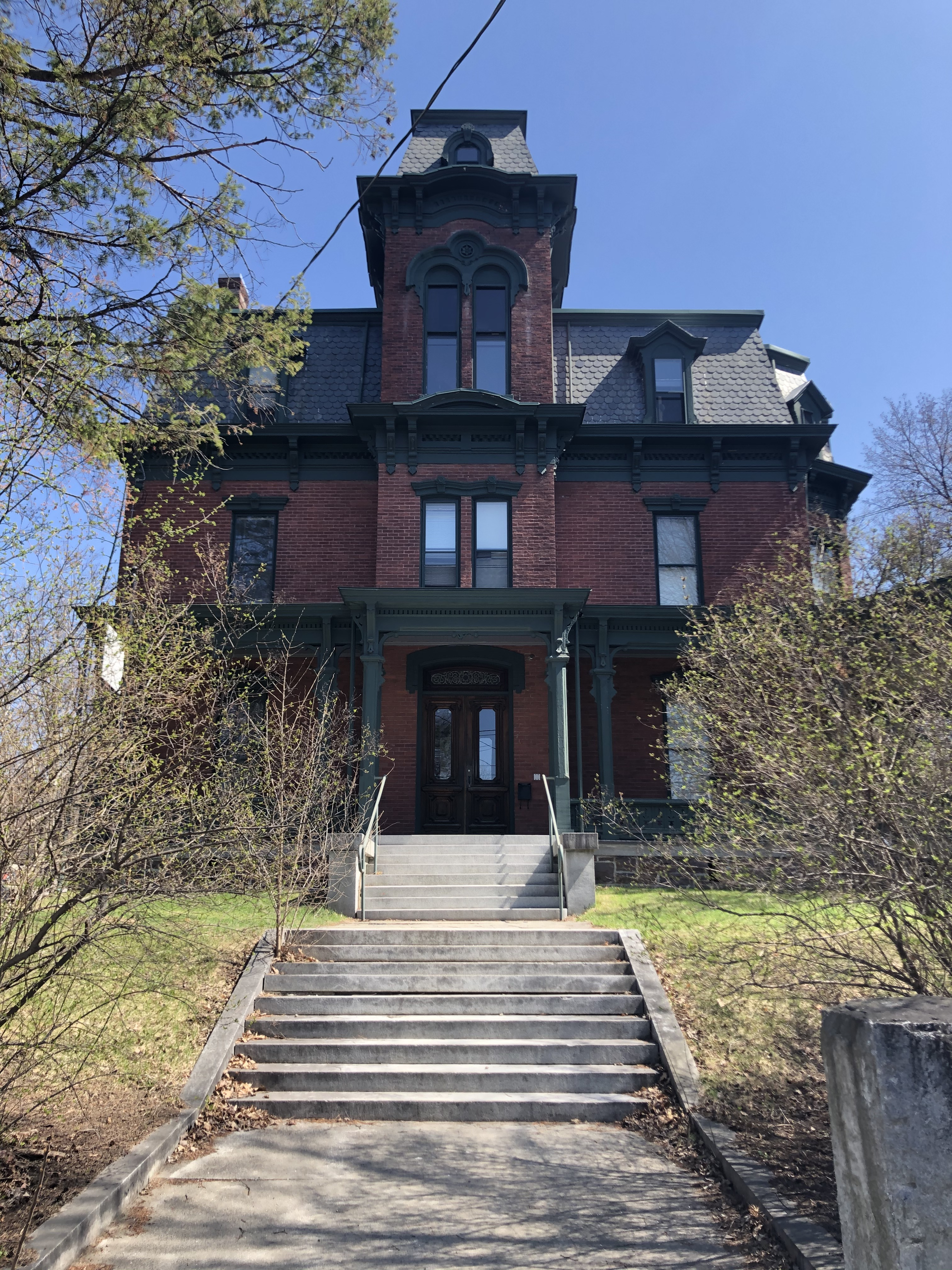
158 South Willard Street. Residence hall, Champlain College.

The South Willard Street Historic District encompasses what was once the most fashionable residential area of Burlington, Vermont. Located along South Willard Street between Pearl and Beech Streets, the architecturally heterogeneous area was in the 19th century home to major estates of the city's business leaders, and has since been infilled with a variety of late 19th and early 20th century architecture. The district was listed on the National Register of Historic Places in 1988.

== Description and history ==
The city of Burlington was incorporated in 1789, and grew rapidly thereafter as a major transportation and industrial hub. Willard Street was laid out in the early 19th century, roughly midway up the sloping terrain between Lake Champlain and the hilltop on which the University of Vermont (UVM) campus is located. Located uphill from downtown Burlington, the area soon developed as a fashionable residential area for the city's upper classes, resulting in a series of widely spaced Federal and Greek Revival houses. In the third quarter of the 19th century, successful businessmen built high-quality Italianate and Second Empire houses, sometimes subdividing the previous estates. Development pressure in the late 19th and early 20th centuries resulted in additional infill construction for the area, which now serves as a melting pot of local workers and students attending UVM or Champlain College, whose campus is located near the center of the district.

The historic district extends along South Willard Street (now designated United States Route 7) from Pearl Street in the north to Beach Street in the south. It includes properties along some of the adjacent side streets, most prominently along Howard, Cliff, Spruce, and Maple Streets. It covers about 67 acres (27 ha), and includes 118 historically significant buildings. They are architecturally diverse, including nearly every architectural style popular in the 19th and early 20th centuries. Although most of these buildings were constructed as residences, some have been repurposed for institutional uses or converted into professional offices. Later buildings include multiunit apartment houses.

== See also ==
- National Register of Historic Places listings in Chittenden County, Vermont
