= Second Empire architecture in the United States and Canada =

19th-century North American architectural style

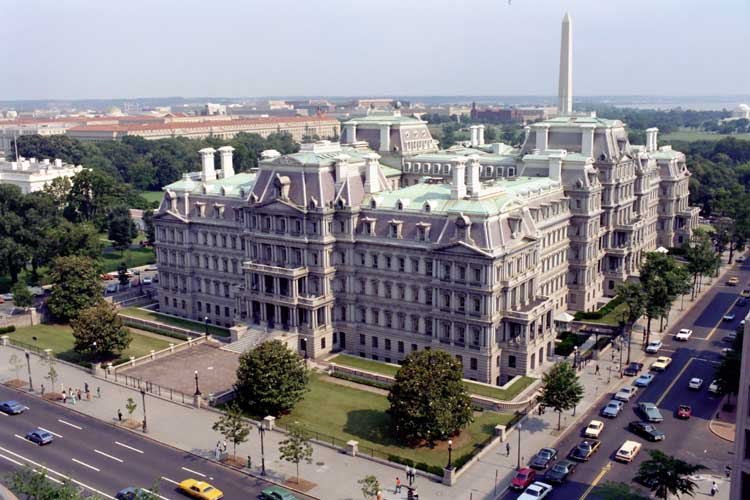
The Eisenhower Executive Office Building on the west side of the White House, in northwest Washington, D.C.

Second Empire architecture in the United States and Canada is an architectural style that was popular in both nations in the late 19th century between 1865 and 1900. Second Empire architecture was influenced by the redevelopment in the mid-19th century of ancient Paris, the capital city of France, under former President of the French Republic (1848–1852), and later Emperor Napoleon III's Second French Empire (1852–1870), and was influenced partly by the architectural styles of the earlier French Renaissance (15th to 17th centuries).

Second Empire architecture is typically characterized by a mansard roof, elaborate ornament, and a strong massing. It was common in public buildings, commercial buildings, and some residential structures.

== Terminology ==
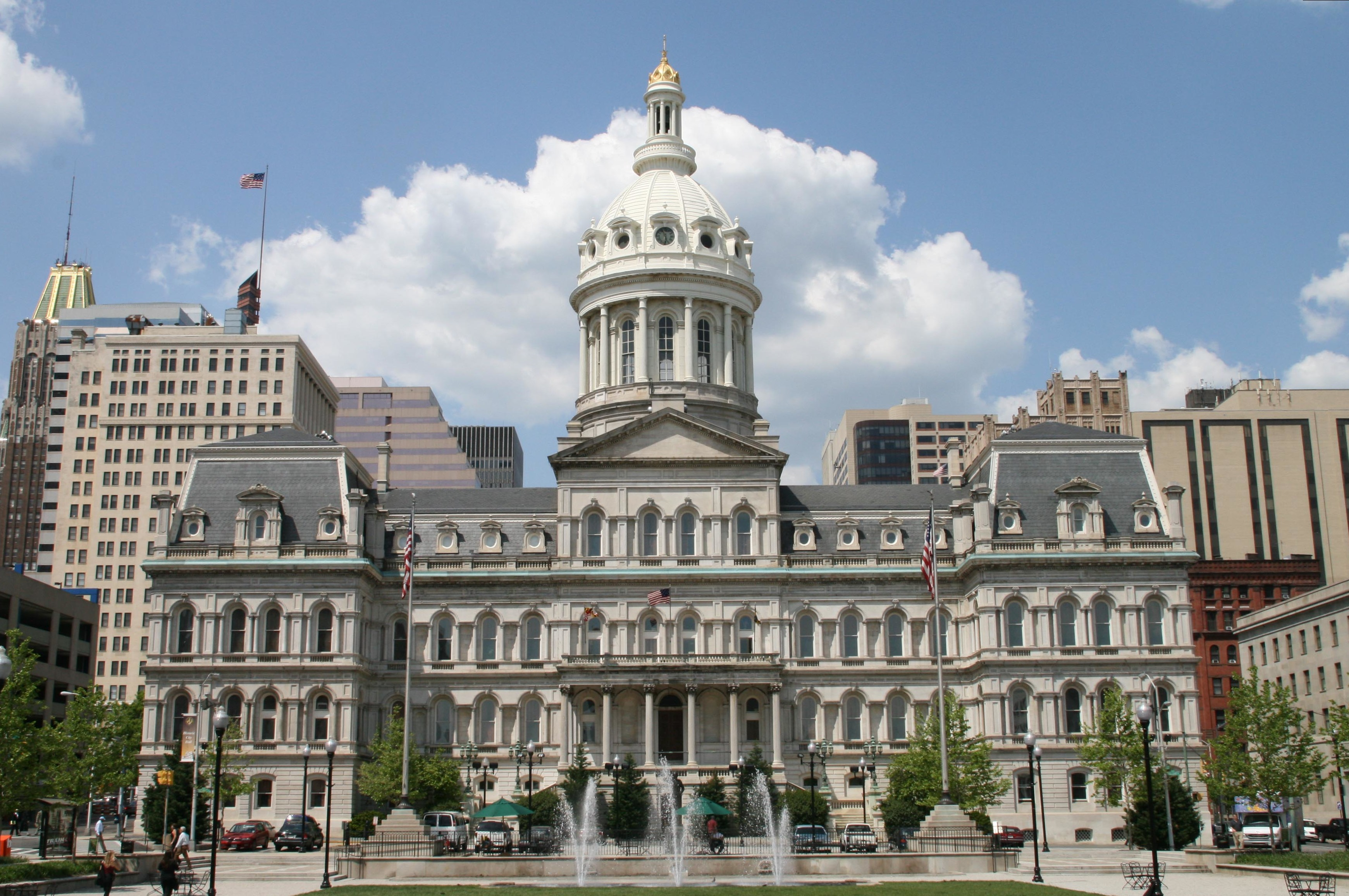
Baltimore City Hall (built 1867–1875), at 200 Holliday Street, facing City Hall / War Memorial Plaza, in the downtown Baltimore central business district, of Baltimore, Maryland; designed by prominent municipal architect George A. Frederick (1842–1924)

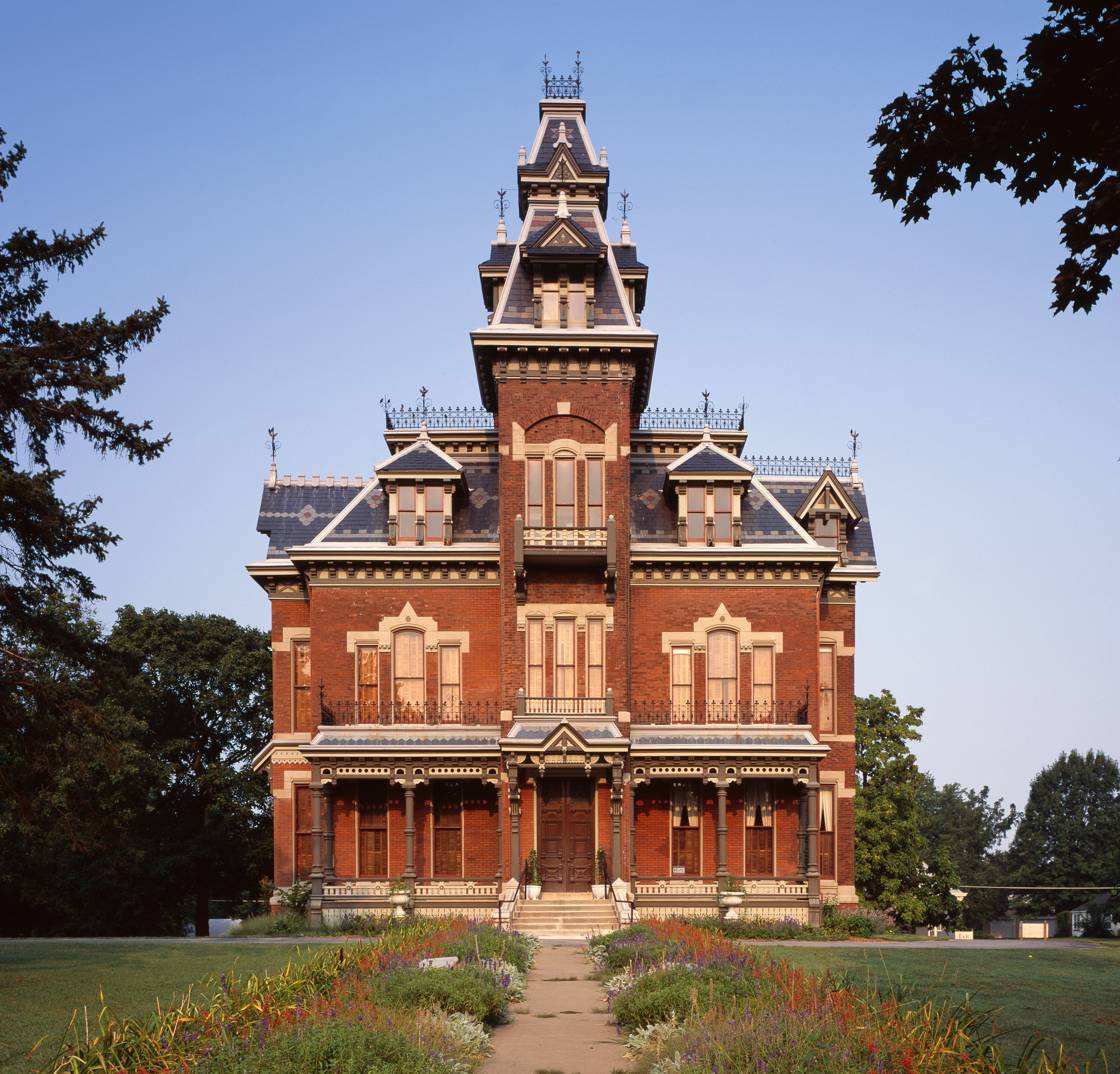
Vaile Mansion in Independence, Missouri

In the 19th century, the standard way to refer to this style of architecture was simply "French" or "Modern French", but later architectural historians / authors came up with the more accurate and descriptive term "Second Empire" or more precisely "French Second Empire". Currently, the style is most widely known as Second Empire, Second Empire Baroque, or French Baroque Revival; Leland M. Roth refers to it as "Second Empire Baroque." Mullett-Smith terms it the "Second Empire or General Grant style" due to its popularity in designing government buildings during the Grant administration.

== Characteristics ==
=== Key features ===
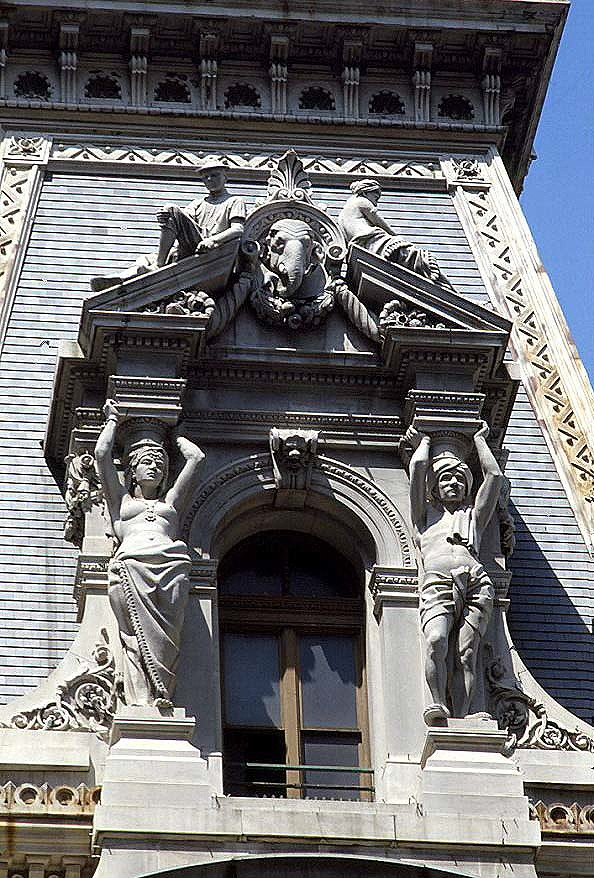
Philadelphia City Hall (built 1877 to 1901), in the Center City of Philadelphia Philadelphia, Pennsylvania, – Close-up photo looking up, showing detail of elaborate stone carving trim on its main clock tower (traditional in French Second Empire architecture). It is surmounted by a bronze huge statue of William Penn (1644–1718), founder of the colonial Province of Pennsylvania and its capital city, situated along the Delaware River of Philadelphia, upstream from the Delaware Bay.

The central feature of the Second Empire architectural style is the mansard roof, a four-sided gambrel roof with a shallow or flat top usually pierced by dormer windows, and usually covered by shingles or stone slate wedges. This roof type originated in 16th century France and was fully developed in the following 17th century by Francois Mansart, after whom it is named. The greatest virtue of the mansard is that it can allow an extra full story of space without raising the height of the formal facade, which stops at the entablature. The mansard roof can assume many different profiles, with some being steeply angled, while others are concave, convex, or s-shaped. Sometimes mansards with different profiles are superimposed upon one another, especially on towers. For most Second Empire buildings, the mansard roof is the primary stylistic feature and the most commonly recognised link to the style's French roots.

A secondary feature is the use of pavilions, a segment of the facade that is differentiated from surrounding segments by a change in height, stylistic features, or roof design and are typically advanced from the main plane of the facade. Pavilions are usually located at emphatic points in a building such as the center or ends and allow the uniformity of the roof to be broken for dramatic effect. While not all Second Empire buildings feature pavilions, a significant number, particularly those built by wealthy clients or as public buildings, do. The Second Empire style frequently includes a rectangular (sometimes octagonal) tower as well. This tower element may be of equal height to the highest floor, or may exceed the height of the rest of the structure by a story or two.

A third feature is massing. Second Empire buildings, because of their height, tend to convey a sense of largeness. Additionally, the facades are typically solid and flat, rather than pierced by open porches or angled and curved facade bays. Public buildings constructed in the Second Empire style were especially built on a massive scale, such as the Philadelphia City Hall and the Eisenhower Executive Office Building, and held records for the largest buildings in their day. Prior to the construction of the Pentagon during the 1940s, for example, the Second Empire–style Ohio State Asylum for the Insane in Columbus, Ohio, was reported to be the largest building under one roof in the U.S., though the title may actually belong to Greystone Park Psychiatric Hospital, another Kirkbride Second Empire asylum.

=== Plans ===
Second Empire plans for public buildings are almost entirely cubic or rectangular, adapted from formal French architectural ensembles, such as the Louvre. Sometimes they include interior courts. Most Second Empire domestic plans are adapted from prevailing plan types developed for Italianate designs by authors such as Alexander Jackson Davis and Samuel Sloan. The prime distinction between the designs is a preference for a central focus rather than a diffusion of forms. Floor plans for Second Empire residences can be symmetrical, with the tower (or tower-like element) in the center, or asymmetrical, with the tower or tower-like element to one side. Virginia and Lee McAlester divided the style into five subtypes:

- Simple mansard roof – about 20%
- Centered wing or gable (with bays jutting out at either end)
- Asymmetrical – about 20%
- Central tower (incorporating a clock and\or belvedere lookout room) – about 30%
- Town house

=== Ornament ===
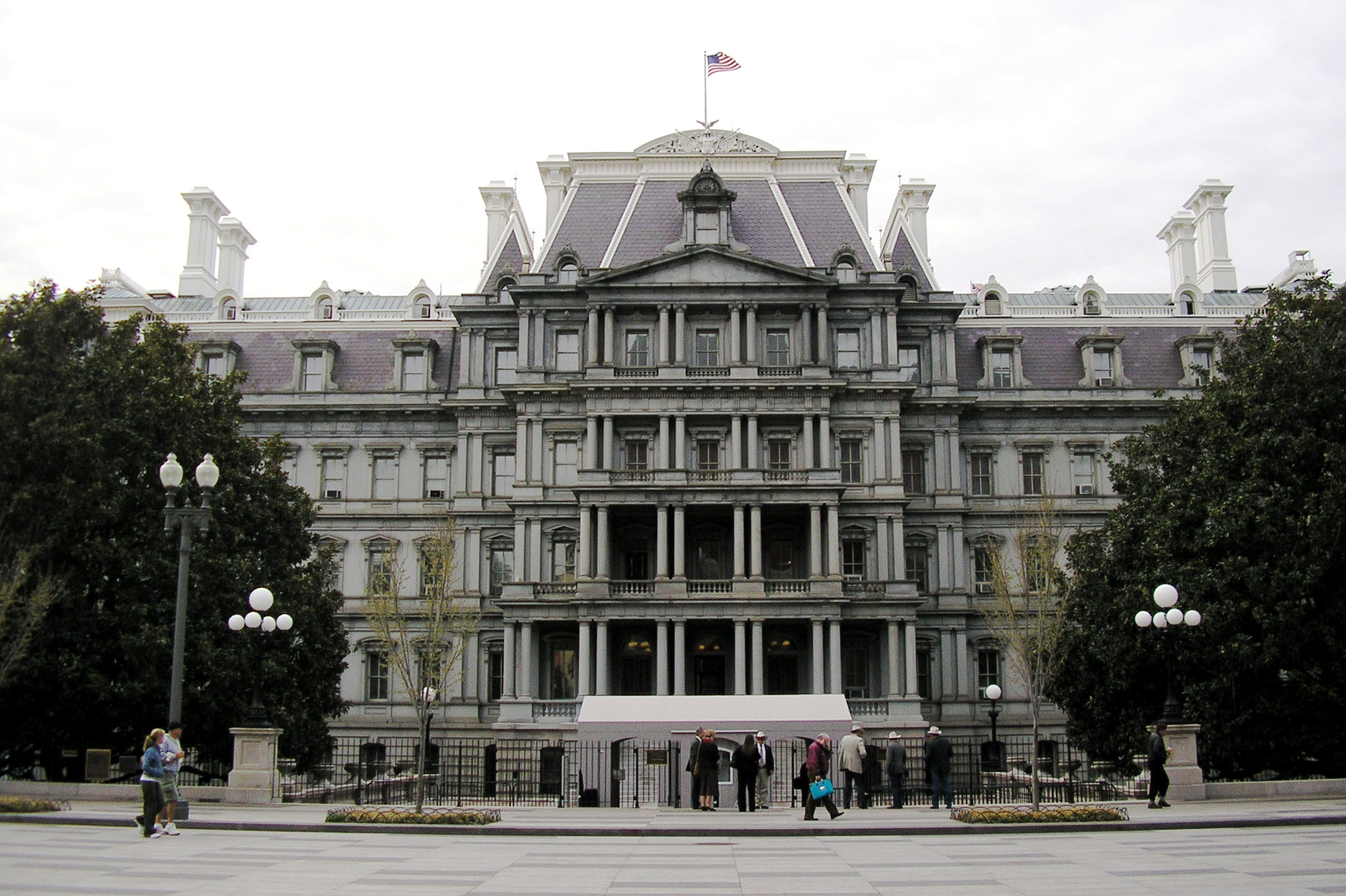
The Eisenhower Executive Office Building in Washington, D.C.

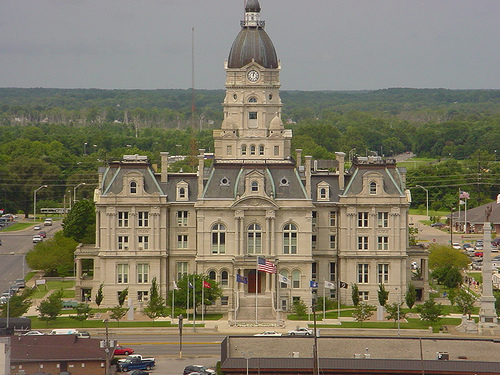
Vigo County Courthouse in Terre Haute, Indiana

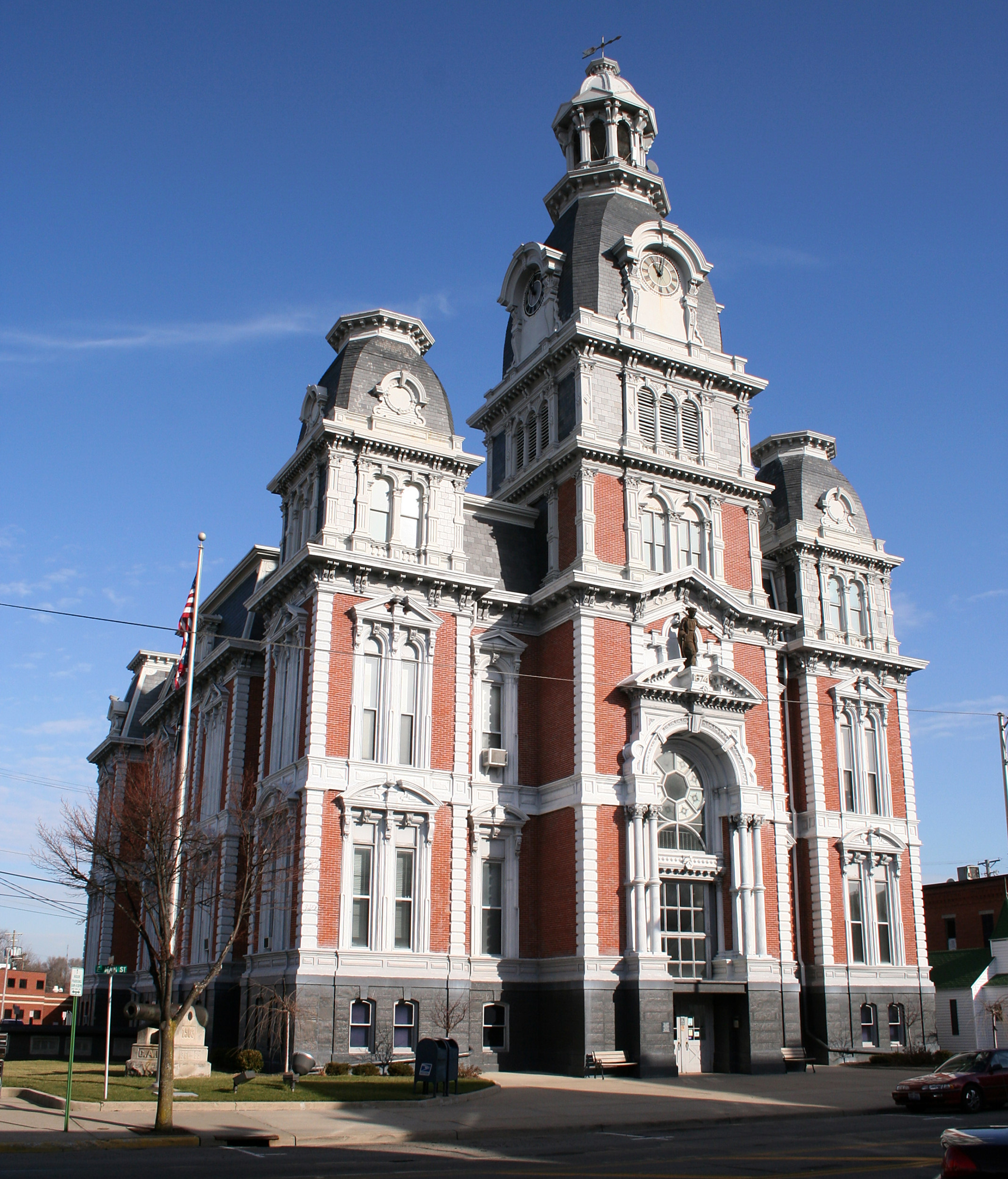
Van Wert County Courthouse in Van Wert, Ohio

There are two variations of Second Empire ornamentation: the high style, which followed French precedents closely and employed rich ornamentation, and the more vernacular styles, which lack a strongly distinctive ornamental vocabulary. The high style is mostly seen in expensive public buildings and the houses of the wealthy, while the vernacular form is more common in typical domestic architecture. The exterior style could be expressed in either wood, brick or stone, though high style examples on the whole prefer stone facades or brick facades with stone details (a brick and brownstone combination seems to be particularly common). Some Second Empire buildings have cast iron facades and elements.

High-style Second Empire buildings took their ornamental cue from the Louvre expansion. Typical features include quoins at the corners to define elements, elaborate dormer windows, pediments, brackets, and strong entablatures. There is a clear preference for a variation between rectangular and segmental arched windows; these are frequently enclosed in heavy frames (either arched or rectangular) with sculpted details. Another frequent feature is a strong horizontal definition of the facade, with a strong string course. Particularly high-style examples follow the Louvre precedent by breaking up the facade with superimposed columns and pilasters that typically vary their order between stories. Vernacular buildings typically employed less and more eclectic ornament than high-style specimens that generally followed the vernacular development in other styles.

The mansard roof ridge was frequently topped with a decorative iron trim, known as "cresting". Often, lightning rods were integrated into the cresting, as pinnacles.

== History ==
The mansard roof, a defining feature of Second Empire design, had evolved since the 16th century in France and Germany and was often employed in 18th- and 19th-century European architecture. Its appearance in the United States was relatively uncommon in the 18th and early 19th centuries. Mount Pleasant in Philadelphia is one of the few early examples, including mansard roofs on its side pavilions.

In Canada, because of French influence in Quebec and Montreal, the mansard roof was more commonly seen in the 18th century and used as a design feature and never entirely fell out of favour. The earliest Second Empire style private residence in English Canada that was built with a mansard roof was for the commercial druggist and land speculator Tristram Bickle between 1850 and 1855.

In the mid-19th century, Second Empire architecture in the United States and Canada began to blossom. A series of major projects and events in French urban planning and design provided the inspiration for Second Empire architecture. Haussmann's renovation of Paris under Napoleon III in the 1850s and the creation of baroque architectural ensembles employing mansard roofs and elaborate ornament provided the impetus for the development and emulation of the style in the US. Haussmann's work was targeted to renovating the decaying Medieval neighborhoods of Paris by wholesale demolition and new construction of streetscapes with uniform cornice lines and stylistic consistency, an urban ensemble that impressed 19th century architects and designers.

The reconstruction of the Louvre Palace between 1852 and 1857 by architects Louis Visconti and Hector Lefuel was widely publicized and served to provide a vocabulary of elaborate baroque architectural ornament for the new style. Finally, the Exposition Universelle of 1855 drew tourists and visitors to Paris and displayed the new architecture and urbanism of the city, an event that brought the style to international attention. These developments worked together to excite interest in design under the Second Empire in the US, particularly among francophiles and those interested in French fashion, then under the sway of Empress Eugenie whose tastes influenced clothing, furniture, and interior decoration. Despite the historicism of the ornamentation, Second Empire architecture was generally viewed as "modern" and hygienic as opposed to the revival styles of Italianate and Gothic Revival which hearkened to the Renaissance and Middle Ages.

The European born and trained architect Detlef Lienau, who studied architecture in Paris and emigrated to the U.S. in 1848, is credited with designing the first Second Empire house in the US, the Hart M. Schiff house in New York City, built in 1850. Lienau remained a prime designer of Second Empire houses, designing the Lockwood-Matthews Mansion in Norwalk, Connecticut (designed 1860). Despite Lienau's work, Second Empire did not displace dominant styles of the 1850s, Italianate and Gothic Revival and remained associated with only particularly wealthy patrons.

The first major Second Empire structure designed by an American architect was James Renwick's gallery, now the Renwick Gallery designed for William Wilson Corcoran (1859–1860). Renwick's gallery was one of the first major public buildings in the style, and its favorable reception furthered interest in Second Empire design. These early buildings display a close affinity to the high-style designs found in the new Louvre construction, with quoins, stone detailing, carved elements and sculpture, a strong division between base and piano nobile, pavilioned roofs, and pilasters.

The outbreak of the Civil War limited new construction in the US, and it was after the end of the war that Second Empire finally came to prominence in American design. The architects Alfred B. Mullett, who was supervising architect for the Treasury Department, and John McArthur Jr. a major designer of public buildings in the Mid-Atlantic, helped popularize the style for public and institutional buildings. Mullet, in particular, who favored the style, was responsible from 1866 to 1874 for designing federal public buildings across the US, spreading Second Empire as a stylistic idiom across the country. His massive and expensive public buildings in St. Louis, Boston, Philadelphia, Cincinnati, New York City, and Washington D.C., which closely followed the precedents set by the Louvre construction with grand mansard roofs and tiers of superimposed columns, made a strong impression on the architects in cities with new Mullett designs. Because of its first major appearance in public buildings, Second Empire quickly became the dominant style for the construction of large public projects and commercial buildings. Ironically, buildings in the style built in the US were often closer to their 17th-century roots than examples of the style found in Europe.

Because of the expense of designing buildings with the level of elaborate detailing found in European and public examples, Second Empire residential architecture was first taken up by wealthy businessmen. Since the Civil War had caused a boom in the fortunes of businessmen in the north, Second Empire was considered the perfect style to demonstrate their wealth and express their new power in their respective communities. The style diffused by the publications of designs in pattern books and adopted the adaptability and eclecticism that Italianate architecture had when interpreted by more middle-class clients. This caused more modest homes to depart from the ornamentation found in French examples in favor of simpler and more eclectic American ornamentation that had been established in the 1850s. In practice, most Second Empire houses simply followed the same patterns developed by Alexander Jackson Davis and Samuel Sloan, the symmetrical plan, the L-plan, for the Italianate style, adding a mansard roof to the composition. Thus, most Second Empire houses exhibited the same ornamentational and stylistic features as contemporary Italianate forms, differing only in the presence or absence of a mansard roof. Second Empire was also a frequent choice of style for remodeling older houses. Frequently, owners of Italianate, Colonial, or Federal houses chose to add a mansard roof and French ornamental features to update their homes in the latest fashions.

As American and Canadian architects went to study in Paris at the École des Beaux-Arts in increasing numbers, Second Empire became more significant as a stylistic choice. Canadian architects benefitted from having a large francophone population in the province of Québec that had for centuries been educated in French styles, as exemplified by the Grand Séminare (1668–1932) with its late Renaissance French colonial design (Québec City). Among the buildings of the American architects that travelled to Paris, the architect H.H. Richardson designed several of his early residences in the style, "evidence of his French schooling". These projects include the Crowninshield House (1868) in Boston Massachusetts, the H. H. Richardson House (1868) in Staten Island, New York, and the William Dorsheimer House (1868) in Buffalo, New York. Chateau-sur-Mer, on Bellevue Avenue, in Newport, Rhode Island, was remodeled and redecorated during the Gilded Age of the 1870s by Richard Morris Hunt in this style. This study, however, along with historical events, proved to be the undoing of the style, although Second Empire buildings continued to be constructed until the end of the 19th century. The fall of Napoleon III and the Second Empire in 1870 and the French defeat in the Franco-Prussian War soured interest in French styles and taste. Additionally, in the US, Alfred Mullett's extravagance in his designs, waste of money, and the scandal of his association with corrupt businessmen, led to his resignation in 1874 from his post as supervising architect, a development that damaged the style's reputation. Finally, as more architects spent time in Paris among the prime examples of French architecture, their style shifted in favor of a closer fidelity to contemporary French designs, leading to the development of Beaux Arts Classicism in the US.

Second Empire was succeeded by the revival of the Queen Anne Style and its sub-styles, which enjoyed great popularity until the beginning of the "Revival Era" in American architecture just before the end of the 19th century, popularized by the architecture at the World's Columbian Exposition in Chicago in 1893.

== Reception in the twentieth century ==
Viewed as out-of-date and emblematic of the excesses of the 19th century, Second Empire architecture was derided in the 20th century, particularly starting in the 1930s.The destruction of such notable buildings as Toronto's forty-five-year old Customs House (1876–1919) exemplify the desire to transition away from French architectural styles. Of Mullet's State, War, and Navy Building, for instance, Woodrow Wilson commented negatively on the building for displaying "every architectural style known to man" and made plans to remodel it, stripping the structure of its Second Empire features. Expensive to maintain, many Second Empire structures fell into decay and were demolished. Philadelphia's City Hall (1871–1901) was narrowly saved from demolition in the 1950s because of the expense of demolishing it, but New York's City Hall Post Office and Courthouse (1869–1880), termed "Mullett's Monstrosity", was demolished in 1939. This development allowed Second Empire domestic architecture to assume a new role in the American imagination, that of the haunted house. This may have been prompted by changes in aesthetics in the 1930s, in favor of cold austere functional buildings, the opposite of elaborate, but decaying Second Empire houses.

In the early and mid-20th century, Second Empire design came to be popularly associated with the sinister; haunted houses are still frequently depicted in the style. Cartoonist Charles Addams, for example, designed a typical Second Empire mansion as the home of his macabre Addams Family, and the similarly spooky family, the Munsters, lived in a Second Empire house during their series. The haunted house where the bats emerge from in the opening of Scooby-Doo, Where Are you? is a Second Empire house. The house in Alfred Hitchcock's Psycho was also in the Second Empire style, as was the decaying house in Frank Capra's It's a Wonderful Life. There were positive representations as well, however: the nostalgic film Meet Me in St. Louis features a large Second Empire mansion beloved by the family. Charles Addams himself also admitted that while his houses were in a rundown state, he "liked Victorian Architecture" and was "not trying to make fun of it".

In the latter part of the 20th century with the rise of the preservation movement, there has been a reevaluation of Second Empire houses and many have chosen to renovate rather than destroy Second Empire properties. By the 21st century, the remaining Second Empire architecture in the United States was once again greatly appreciated and valued by most for its sense of beauty, grandeur, and quirkiness while ironically the work of architects who originally chastised the style saw even greater criticism.

== Examples in Canada ==
- 124 Syndenham Street, John McIntyre House, (1876), Hochelaga Inn in Kingston, Ontario
- Balfour House (1880) in Hamilton, Ontario; James Balfour, architect
- Beardmore Mansion, Italian Consulate (1871), 136 Beverly St. in Toronto; Eden Smith, architect
- Customs House at Yonge and Front streets (1873–1876, demolished 1919) in Toronto; Richard Cunningham Windeyer, architect
- Francis Shields House (1878–77) in Toronto; Bruce and Hagon architects
- Glanmore House (1882–83) in Belleville, Ontario; Thomas Hanley, architect
- James Cooper House (1881) in Toronto (now James Cooper Condo clubhouse)
- Meahan House (1839–1842) in Bathurst, New Brunswick
- Montreal City Hall (French: Hôtel de Ville de Montréal) in Montreal; by architects Henri-Maurice Perrault and Alexander Cowper Hutchison, built between 1872 and 1878
- Prime Minister's Block, Canadian Parliament Buildings, (1884–89) in Ottawa; Thomas Fuller, architect
- Pinehurst (1851), Tristam Bickle Mansion in Hamilton, Ontario; architect unknown
- Victoria City Hall (1890) in Victoria, British Columbia; John Teague, architect

== Examples in the United States ==
- 49 Conger Avenue (1885) in Haverstraw, New York; architect unknown. The inspiration for Edward Hopper’s 1925 painting House by the Railroad
- 126 Waterman Street in Providence, Rhode Island (1870); William G.E. Mowry, architect
- 158 South Willard Street (1877) in the South Willard Street Historic District of Burlington, Vermont; built for General William Wells
- Abner L. Harris House (1873) in Reedsburg, Wisconsin; William Dierks, architect
- Alexander Ramsey House (1868) in Saint Paul, Minnesota; Sheire and Summers, architects
- Atlanta Union Station (1871) in Atlanta; Max Corput, architect
- Baltimore City Hall (1869–1875) in Baltimore; George A. Frederick, architect
- Bancroft Hall (1901–1906), United States Naval Academy in Annapolis, Maryland; Ernest Flagg, architect
- Caldwell County Courthouse (1894) in Lockhart, Texas, Giles and Guidon, architects
- Central Hall on the Hillsdale College campus (1875) in Hillsdale, Michigan
- William A. M. Culbert House (1851) in Newburgh, New York; Downing and Vaux, architects
- College Hall (1868–1872) in Montpelier, Vermont
- Crockett County Courthouse (1902) in Ozona, Texas; Oscar Ruffini, architect
- Davis County Courthouse (1877) in Bloomfield, Iowa; Thomas J. Tolan, architect
- Edward Penniman House (1868) in Eastham, Massachusetts
- Eisenhower Executive Office Building (1871–1888) in Washington, D.C.; Alfred B. Mullett, architect
- Fulton Mansion Historical Site (1877) in Fulton, Texas
- Gilsey House (1869–1871) in New York City; Stephen Decatur Hatch, architect
- Grand Opera House (1871) in Wilmington, Delaware; Thomas Dixon, architect
- Hall of Languages, Syracuse University (1871–1873) in Syracuse, New York; Horatio Nelson White, architect
- Heck-Andrews House (1869–1870) in Raleigh, North Carolina; George S. H. Appleget, architect
- Henry G. Taft House in the Woodland Street Historic District (1868) in Worcester, Massachusetts; architect unknown
- Hood County Courthouse (1876) and (1890); designed by W.C. Dodson
- Jens Naeset House (1878) in Stoughton, Wisconsin; Jens Naeset, architect
- Knowlton Hat Factory (1872) in Upton, Massachusetts; architect unknown
- Main Building (1861) at Vassar College in Poughkeepsie, New York; James Renwick Jr., architect
- Mill No. 3 (1866-1868) at Harmony Mills in Cohoes, New York; D.H. Van Auken, architect
- Mitchell Building (1876) and adjacent Chamber of Commerce (1879) in Milwaukee; E. Townsend Mix, architect
- Old City Hall (1862–1865) in Boston; Bryant and Gilman, architects
- Old Main (1873–1875) at the University of Arkansas in Fayetteville, Arkansas; John M. Van Osdel, architect
- Park-McCullough Historic House (1865), 1 Park Street in North Bennington, Vermont; Diaper and Dudley, architect
- Hotel Emma, part of Pearl Brewery (1894) in San Antonio; August Maritzen, architect
- Philadelphia City Hall (1871–1901) in Philadelphia; John McArthur Jr., architect
- Providence City Hall (1878) in Providence, Rhode Island; Samuel J. F. Thayer, architect
- Reitz Home (1871) in Evansville, Indiana
- Renwick Gallery, Smithsonian Institution (1859–1873) in Washington, D.C.; James Renwick Jr., architect
- South Hall (1873) at the University of California, Berkeley in Berkeley, California; Farquharson and Kenitzer, architects
- Spring Hill Ranch House (1881), Tallgrass Prairie National Preserve in Strong City, Kansas
- St. Ignatius College Prep (1869) in Chicago; Toussaint Menard, architect
- Terrace Hill (1866–1869) in Des Moines, Iowa (the Iowa governor's residence); William W. Boyington, architect
- United States Post Office (1884–1888) in Hannibal, Missouri; Mifflin E. Bell, architect
- United States Customhouse and Post Office (1873–1884) in St. Louis; one of four surviving Second Empire office buildings designed by architect Alfred B. Mullett
- Vigo County Courthouse (1884–1888) in Terre Haute, Indiana; Samuel Hannaford, architect
- Woodburn Hall (1874–1886) in Morgantown, West Virginia; additions by Elmer F. Jacobs, architect

=== Destroyed or demolished ===
- Arlington Hotel in Washington D.C.; Edmund George Lind, architect, 1868, destroyed in 1912
- Cincinnati Custom House and Post Office (1875–1885); Alfred B. Mullett, architect; demolished in 1936
- City Hall Post Office and Courthouse (1869–1880) in New York City; Alfred B. Mullett, architect; destroyed in 1939
- Detroit Old City Hall (1871) in Detroit, Michigan; designed by James Anderson and demolished in 1961
- Grand Union Hotel (1870) in Saratoga Springs, New York; destroyed in 1953
- Jerome Mansion (1859–1865), 32 East 26th Street in New York City; Thomas R. Jackson architect, destroyed in 1967

== Gallery of public buildings ==
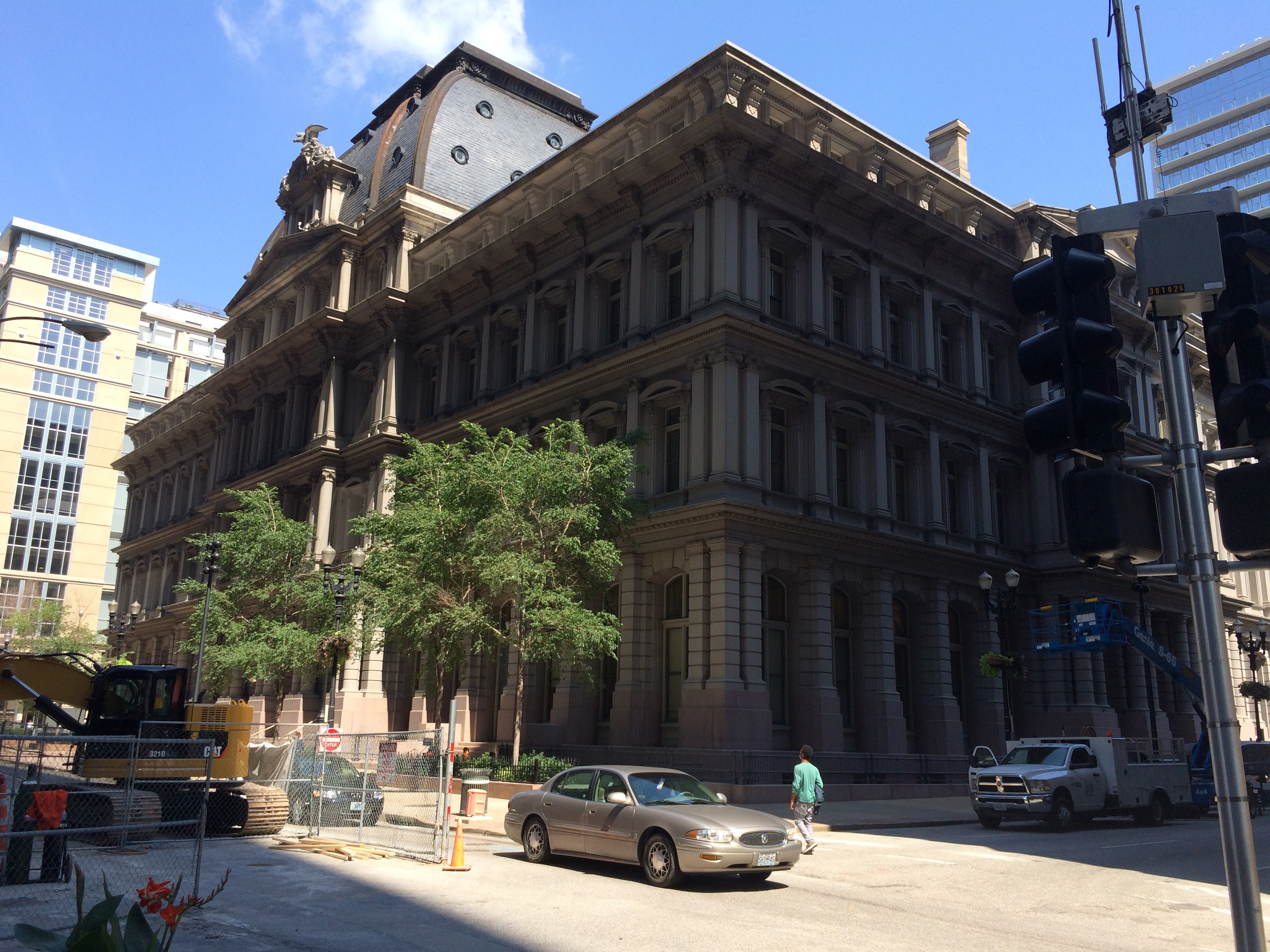
Old Post Office, St. Louis, Missouri

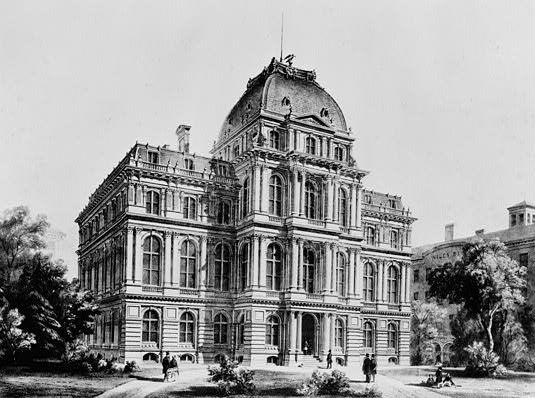
Old City Hall, Boston, Massachusetts

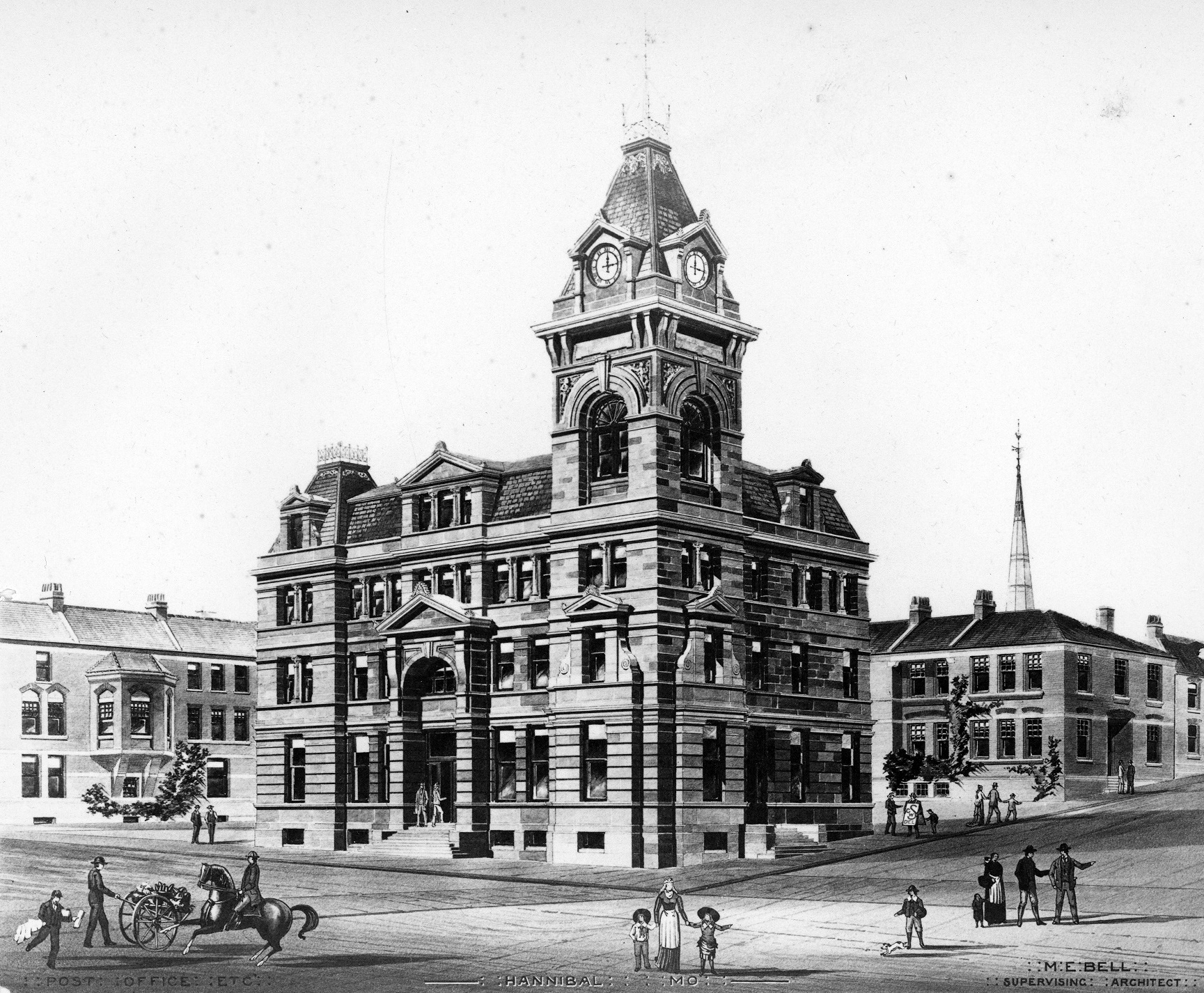
U.S. Post Office, Hannibal, Missouri

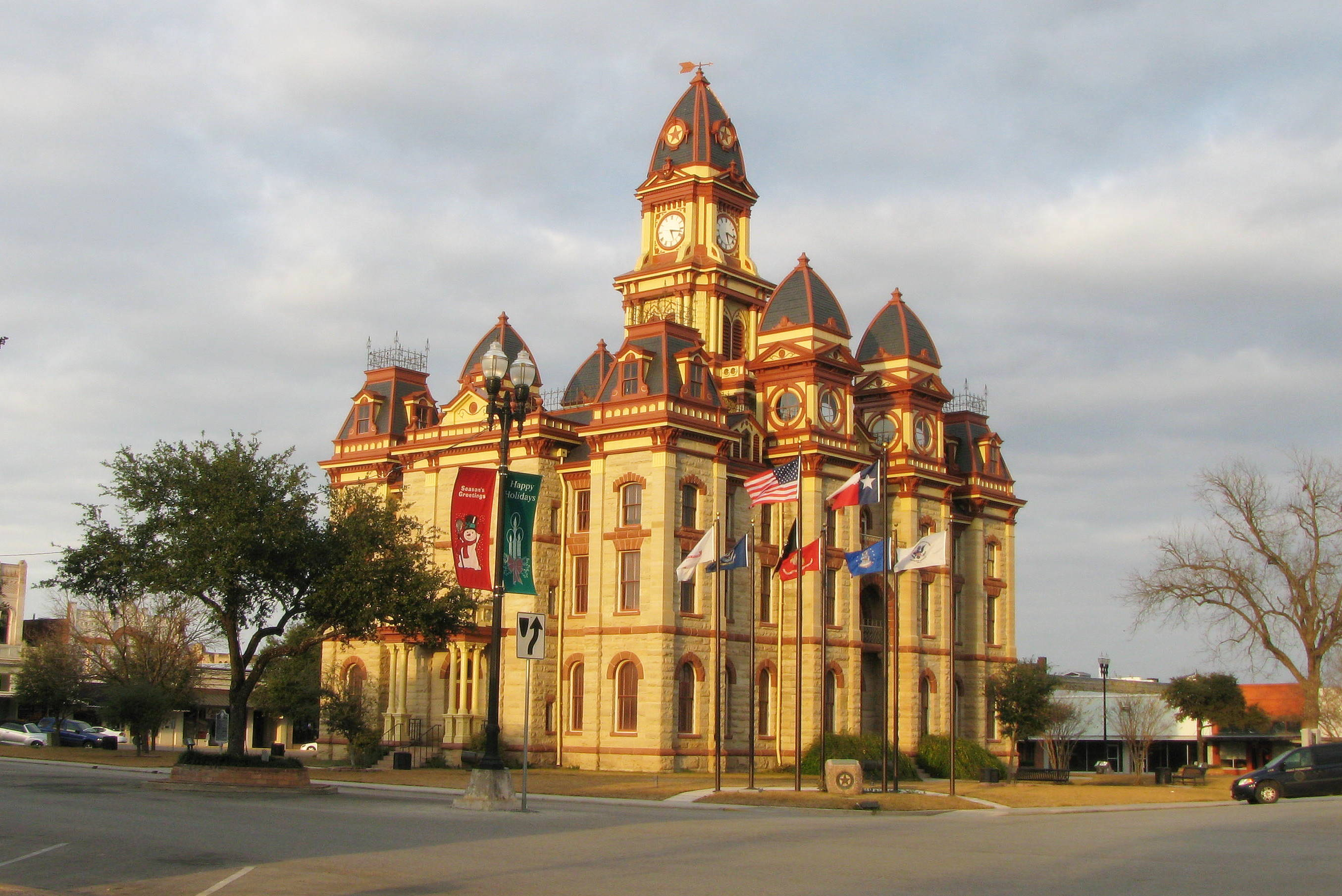
Caldwell County Courthouse, Lockhart, Texas

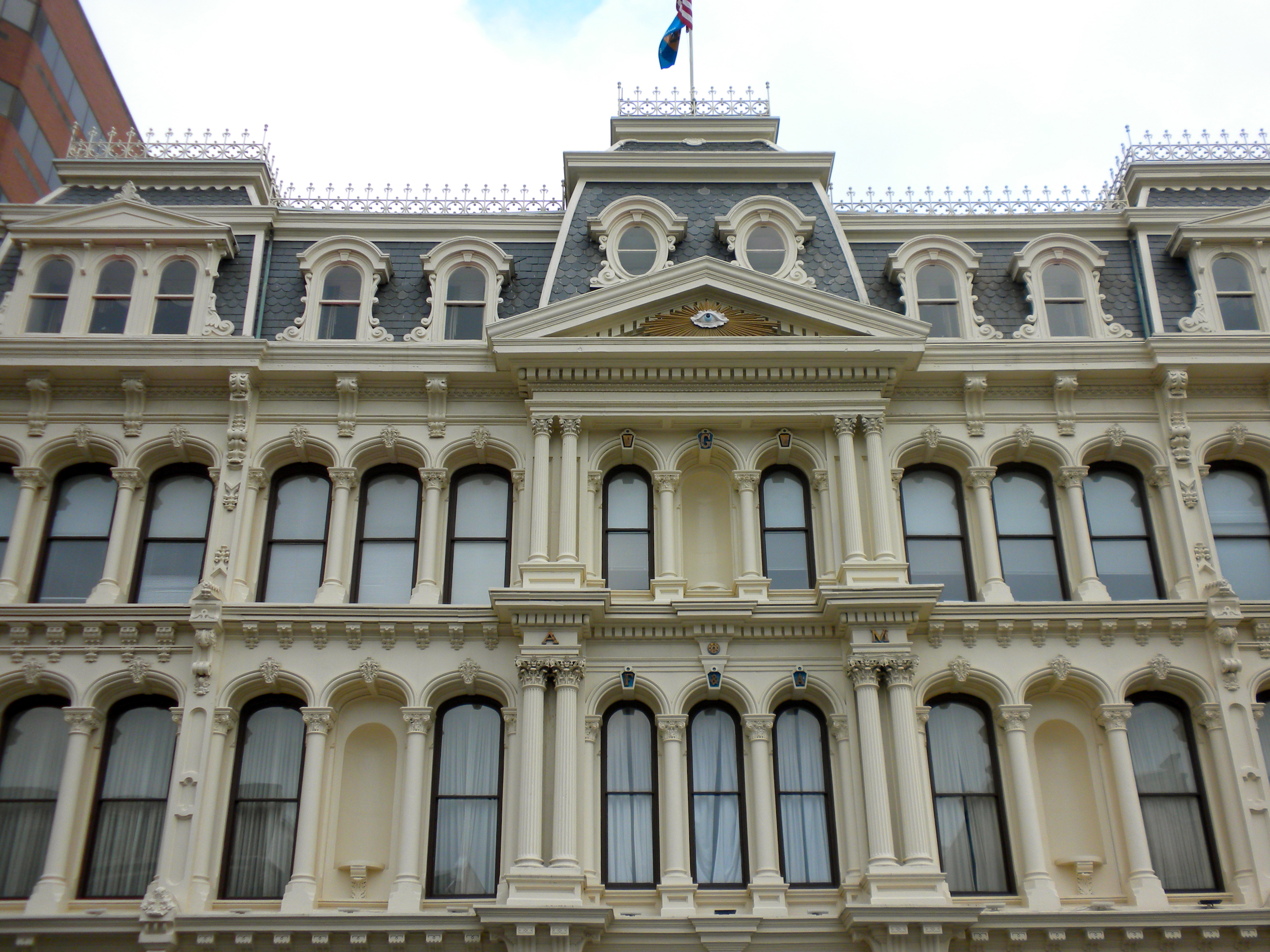
Grand Opera House, Wilmington, Delaware

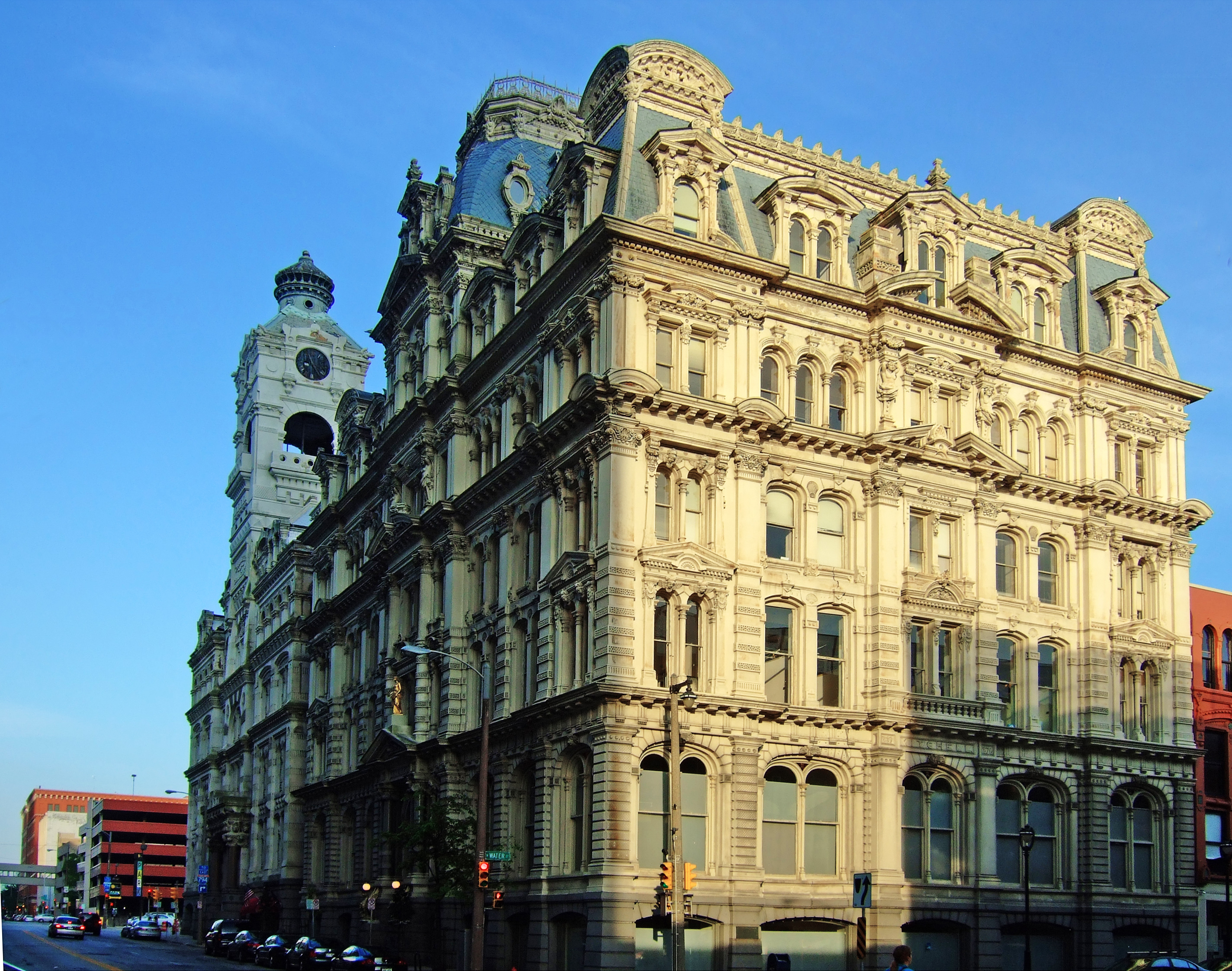
Mitchell Building + Chamber of Commerce, Milwaukee, Wisconsin

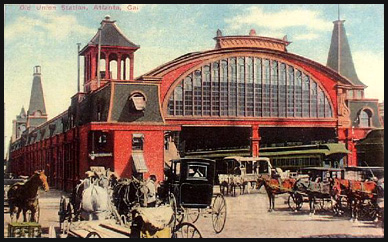
Atlanta's 1871 Union Station, Atlanta, Georgia (demolished in 1930)

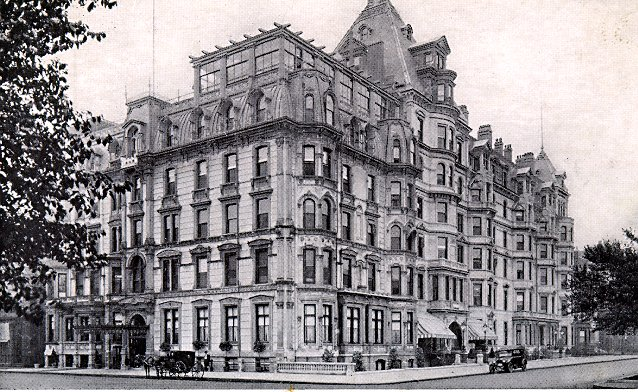
Hotel Vendome, Boston, Massachusetts (destroyed by fire in 1972)

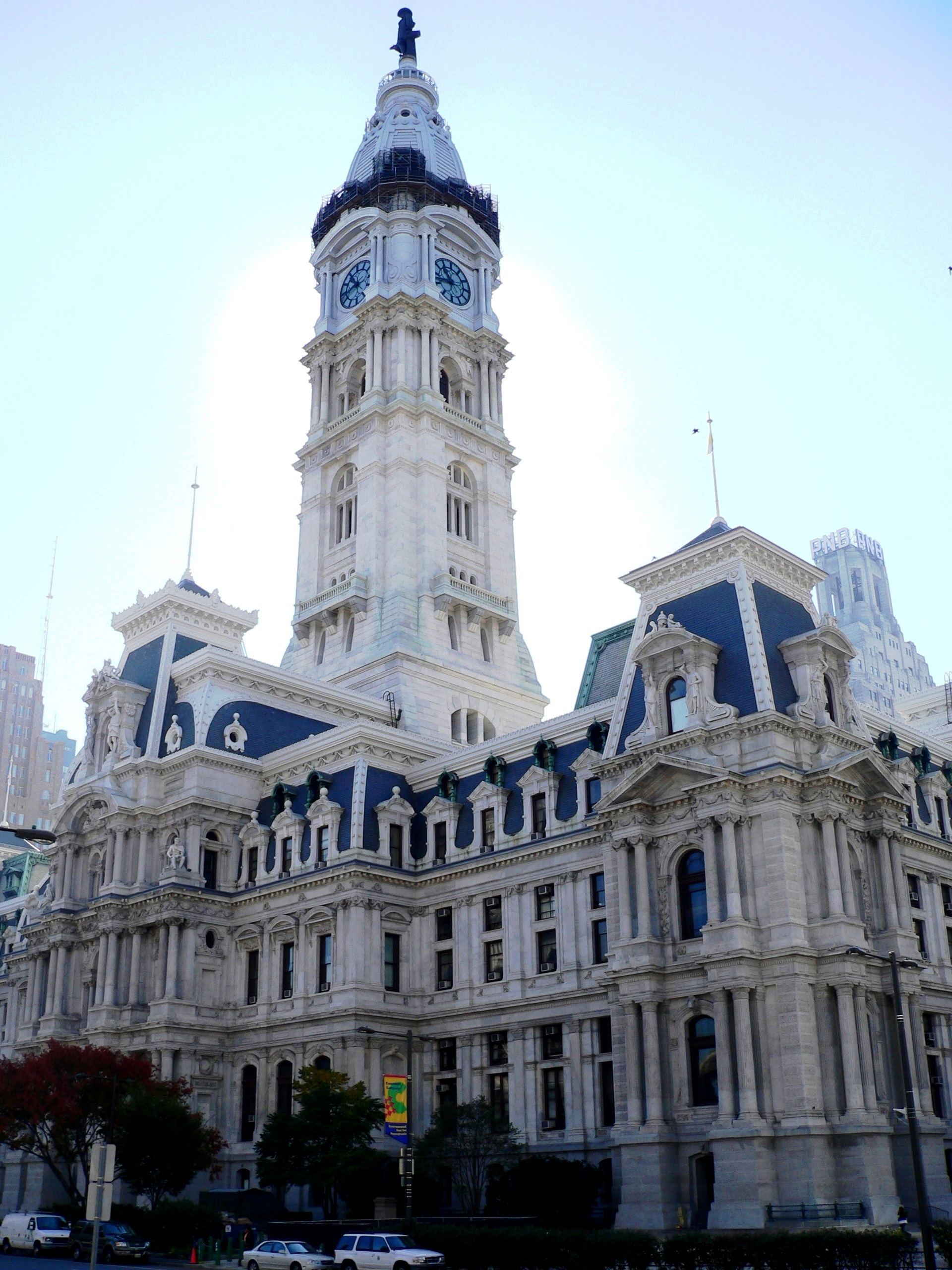
Philadelphia City Hall, Philadelphia, Pennsylvania

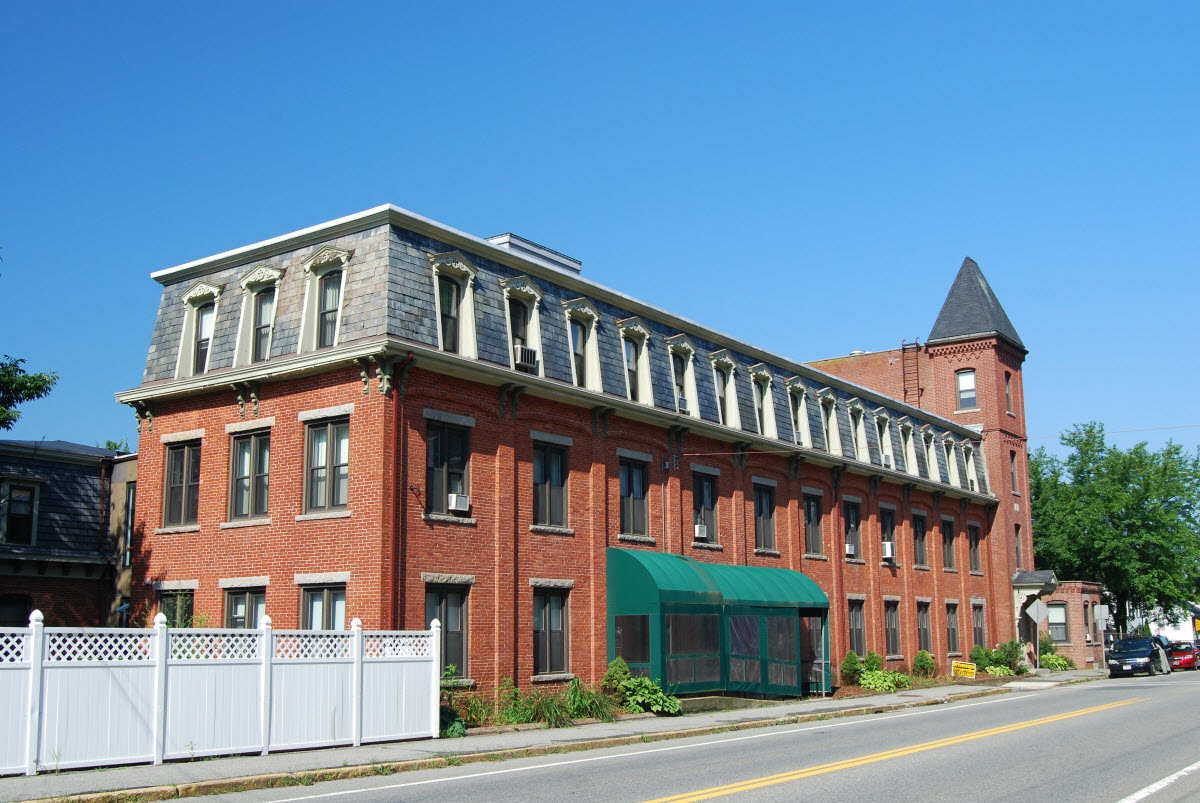
Knowlton Hat Factory, Upton, Massachusetts

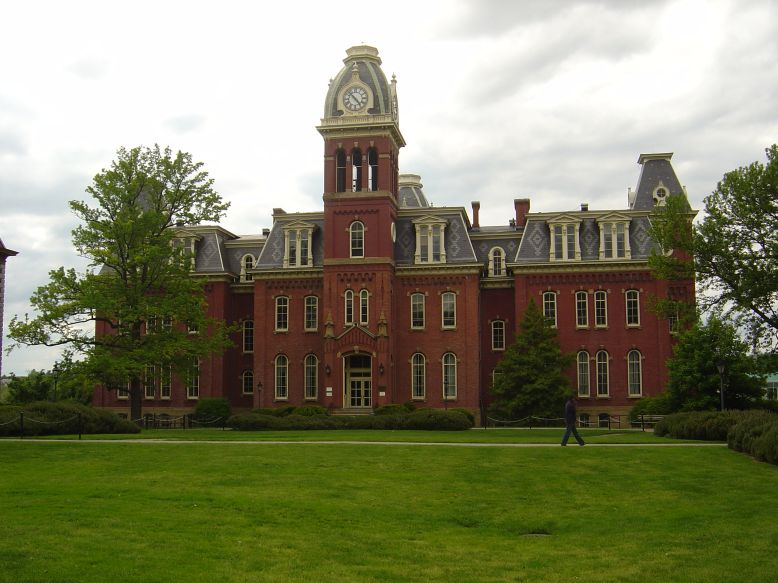
Woodburn Hall, Morgantown, West Virginia

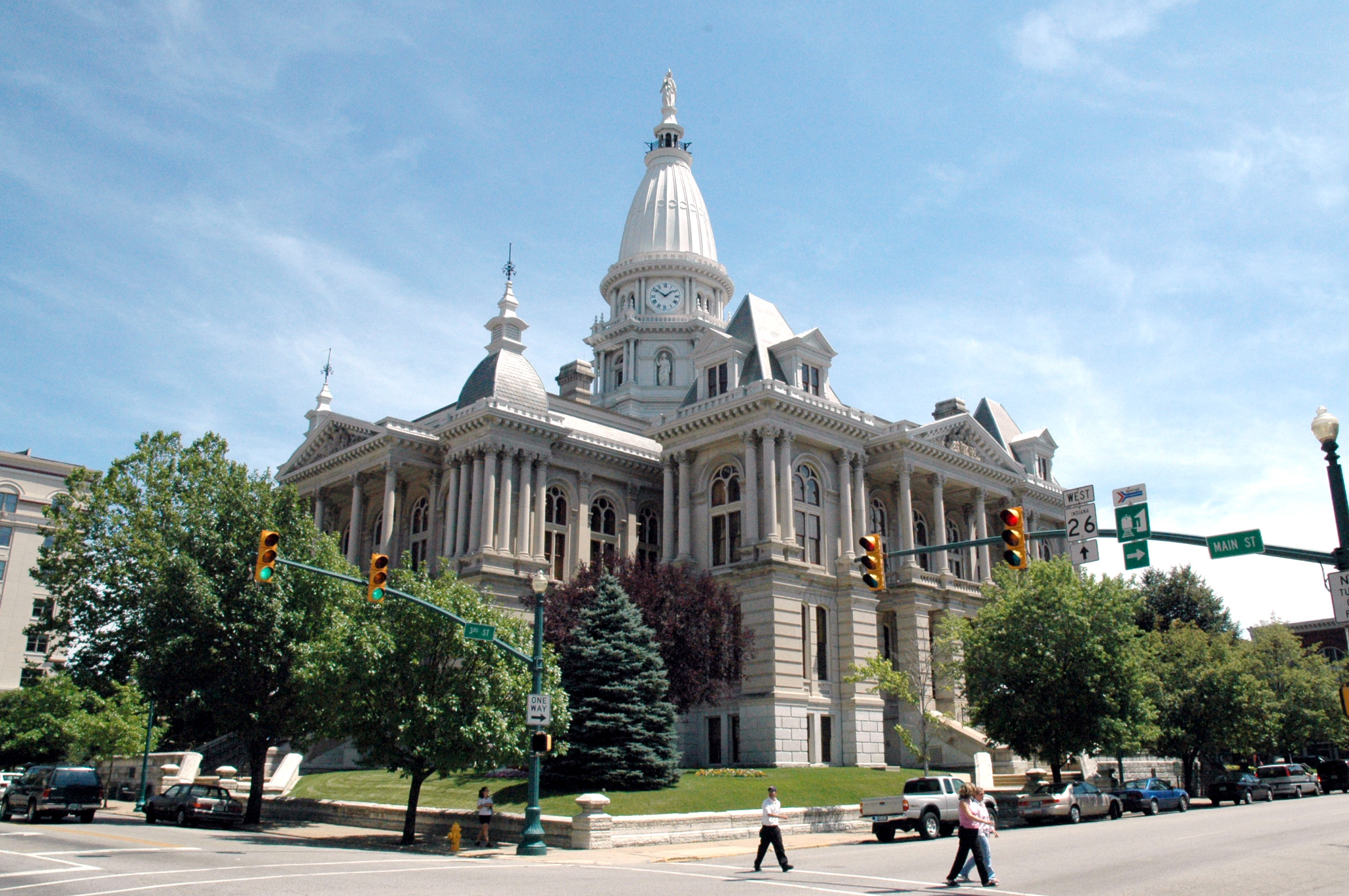
Tippecanoe County Courthouse, Lafayette, Indiana

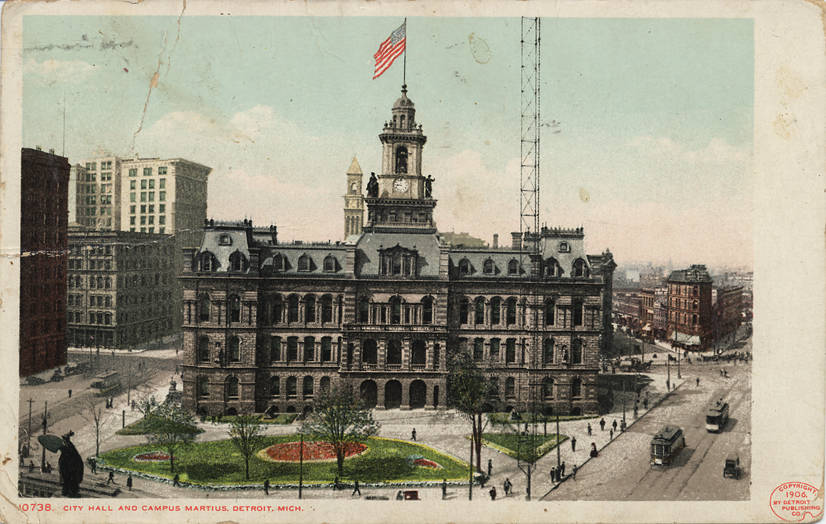
Detroit Old City Hall, Detroit, Michigan, demolished in 1961.

== Gallery of residential buildings ==
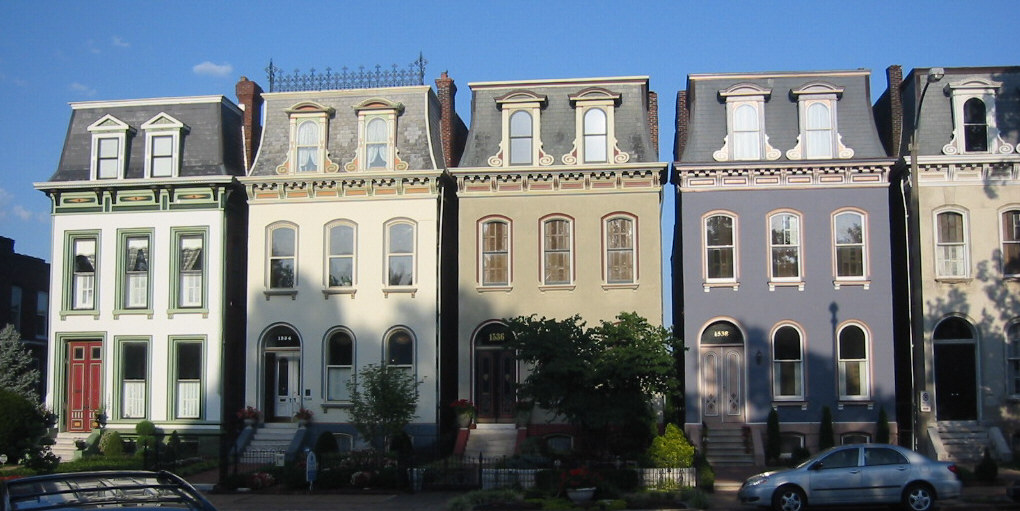
Lafayette Square, St. Louis, Missouri.

Terrace Hill, Des Moines, Iowa

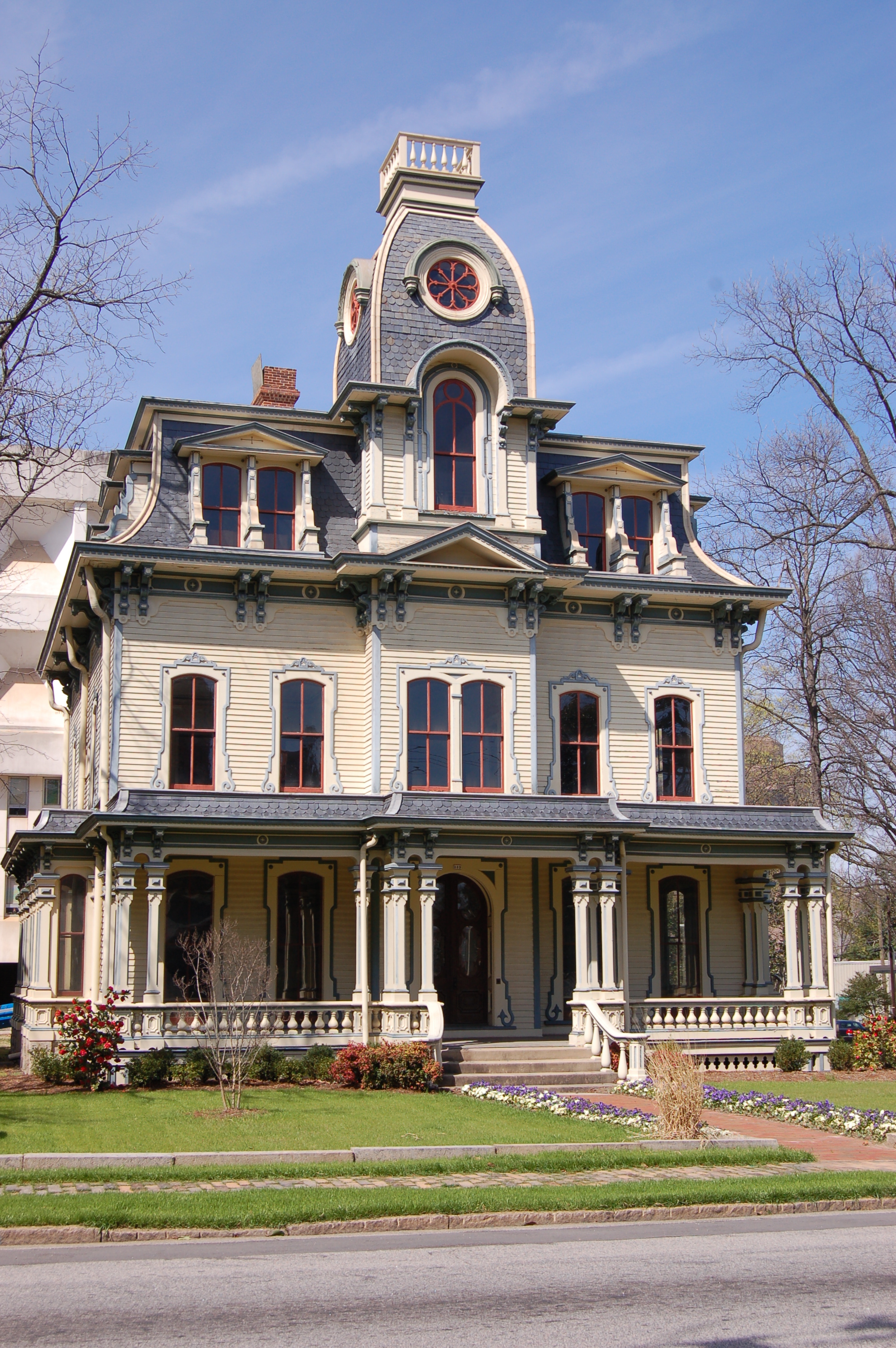
Heck-Andrews House, Raleigh, North Carolina

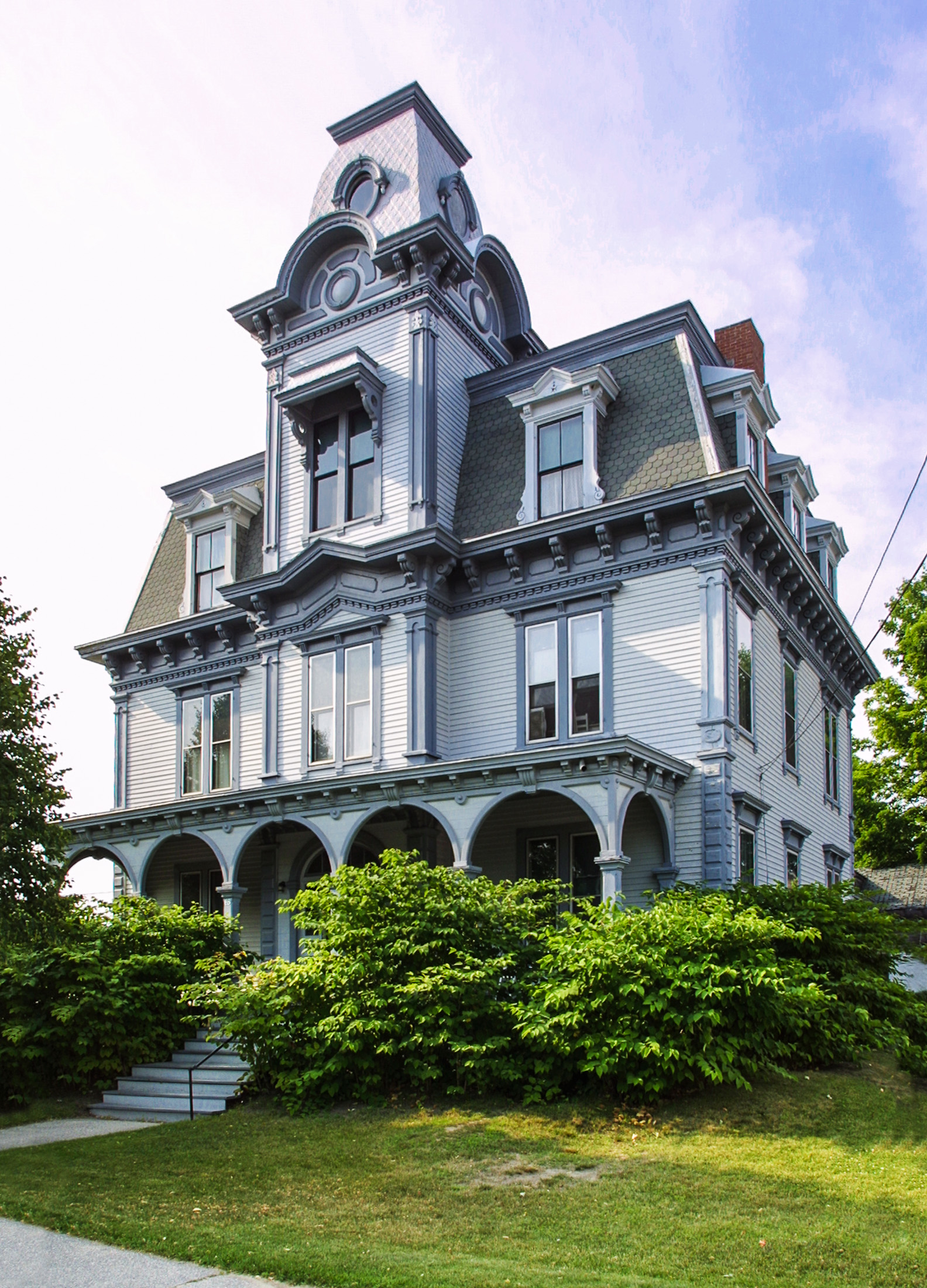
Charles A. Jordan House, Auburn, Maine

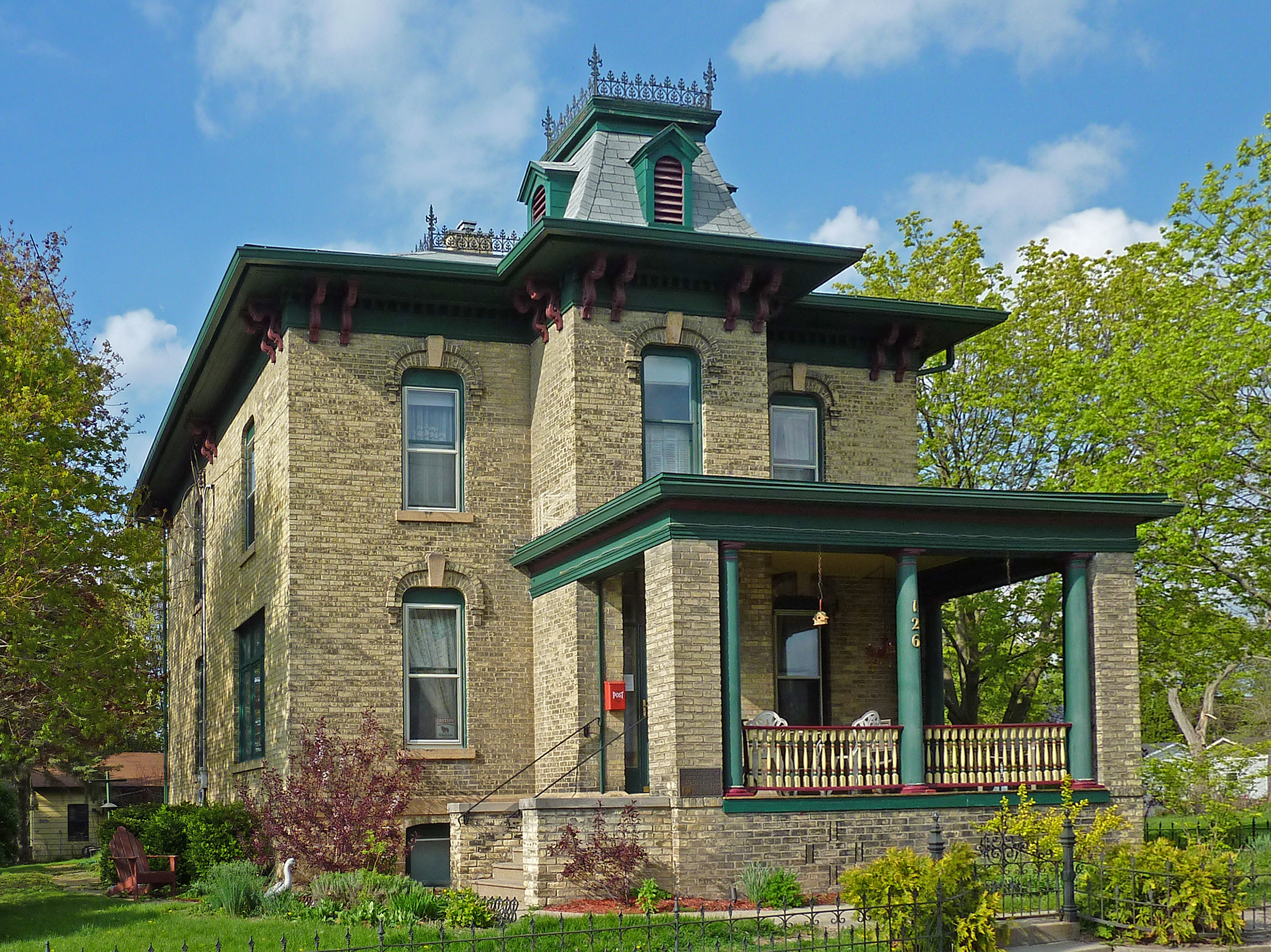
Jens Naeset House, Stoughton, Wisconsin

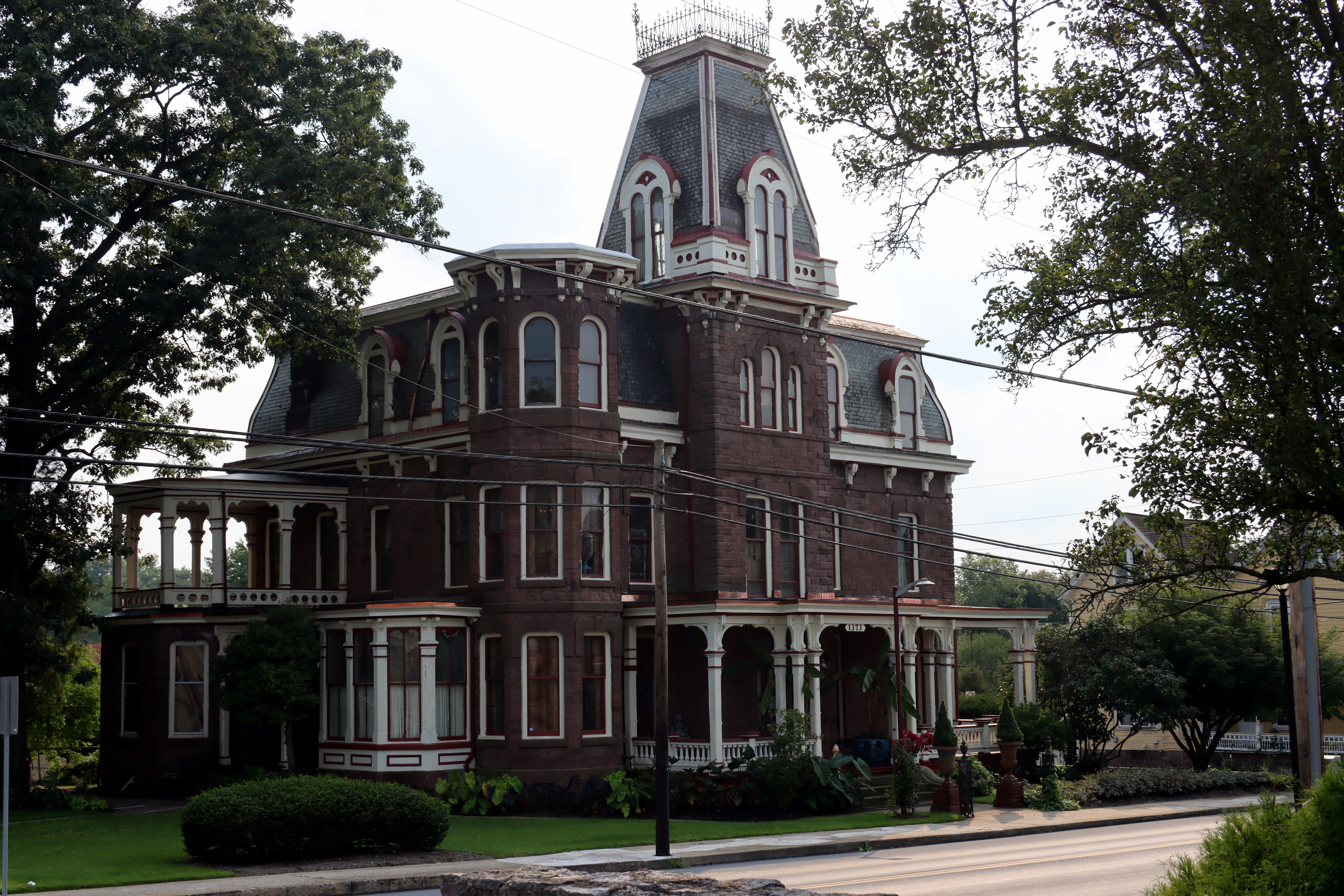
Weigley Mansion, Schaefferstown, Pennsylvania

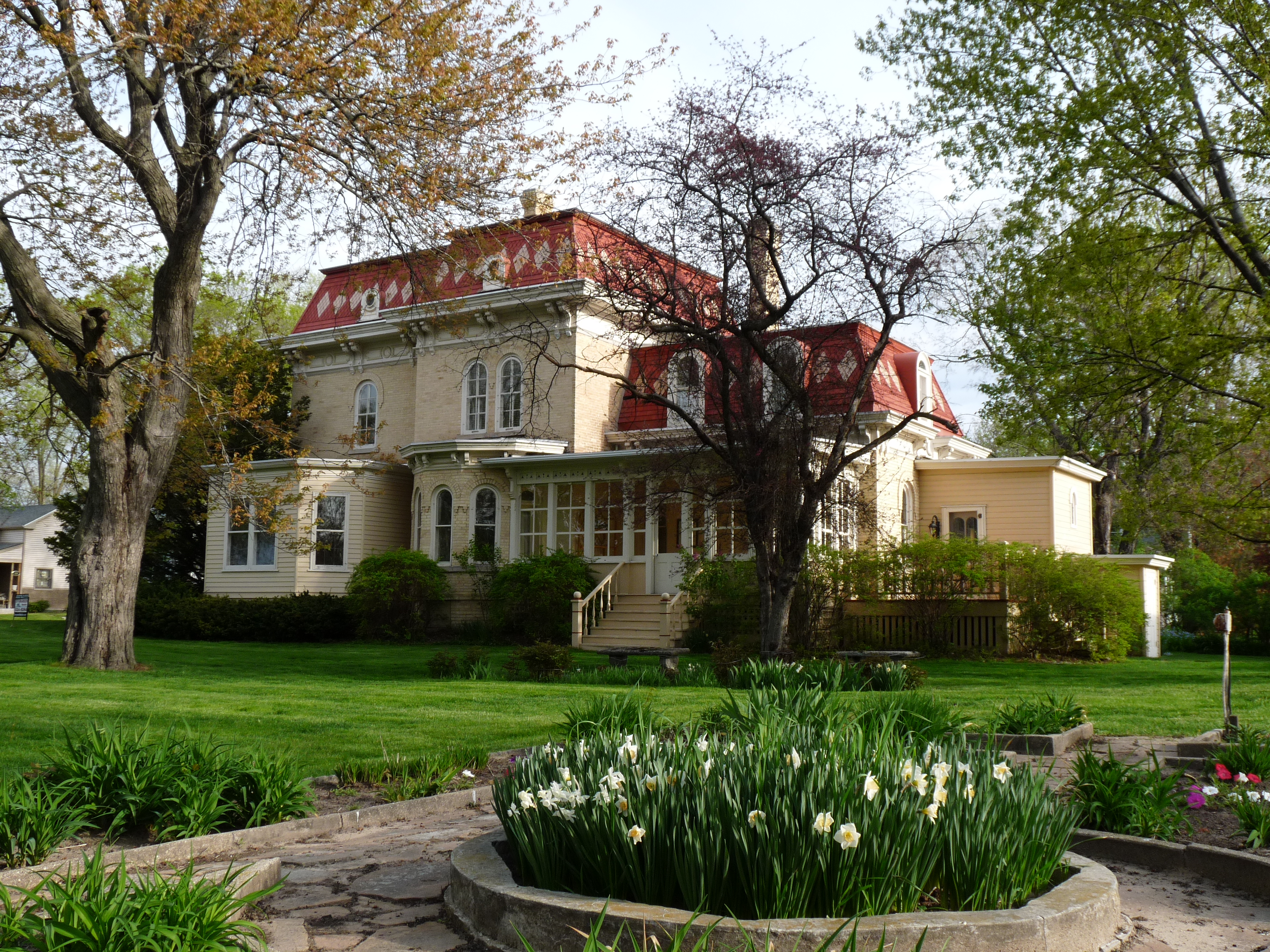
Abner L. Harris House, Reedsburg, Wisconsin

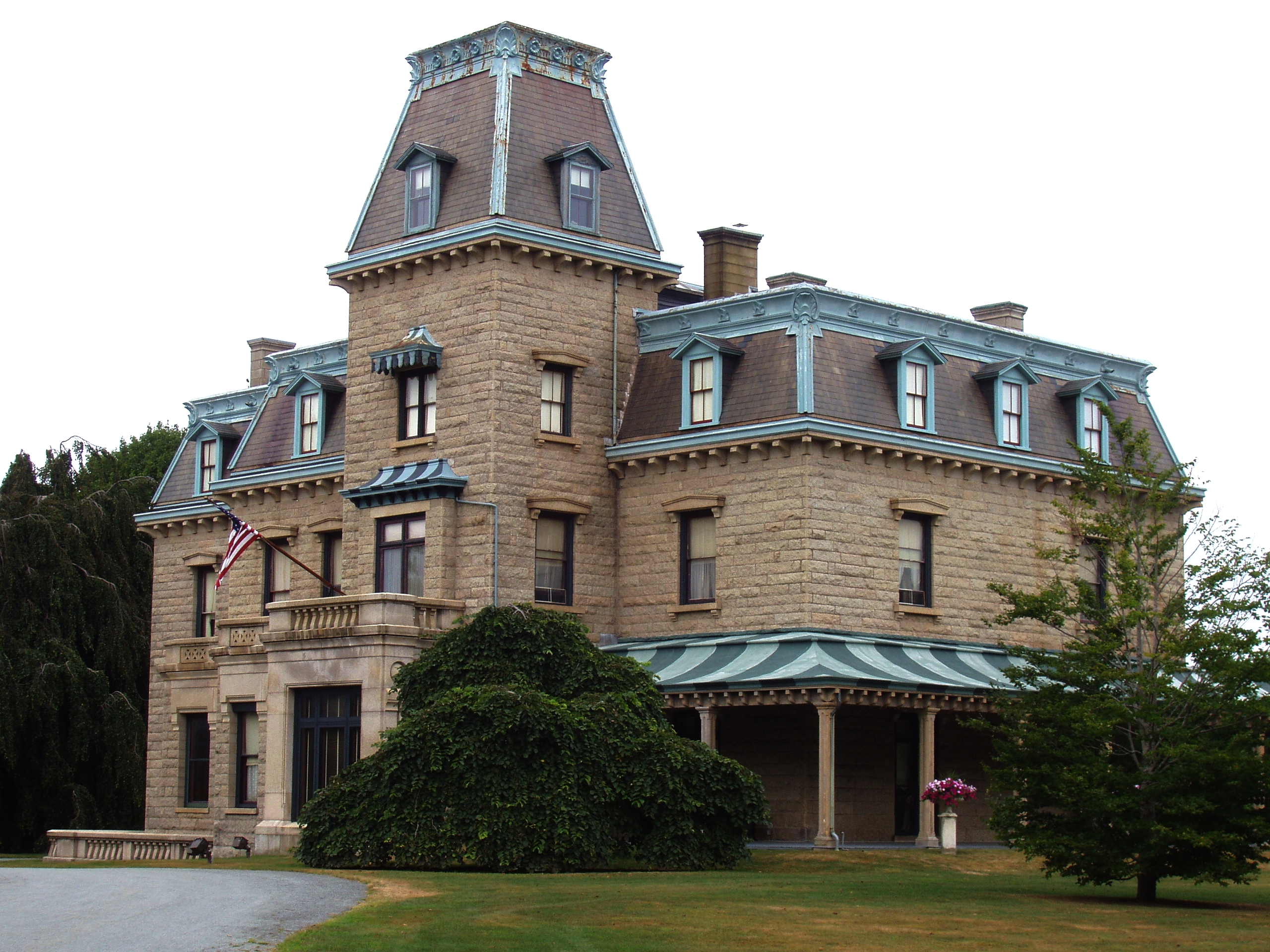
Chateau-sur-Mer, Bellevue Avenue, Newport, Rhode Island

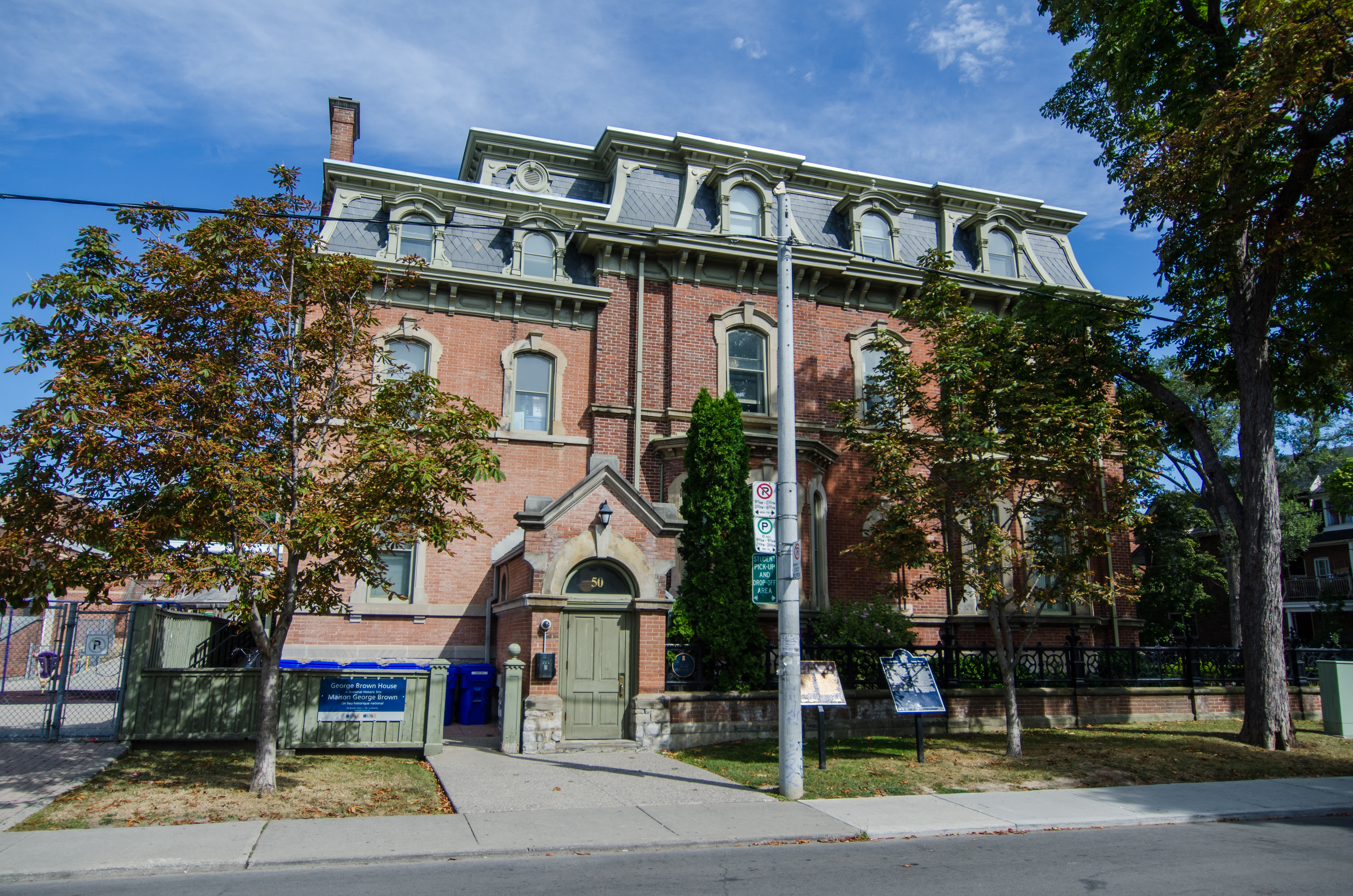
George Brown House (Toronto), Toronto, Ontario

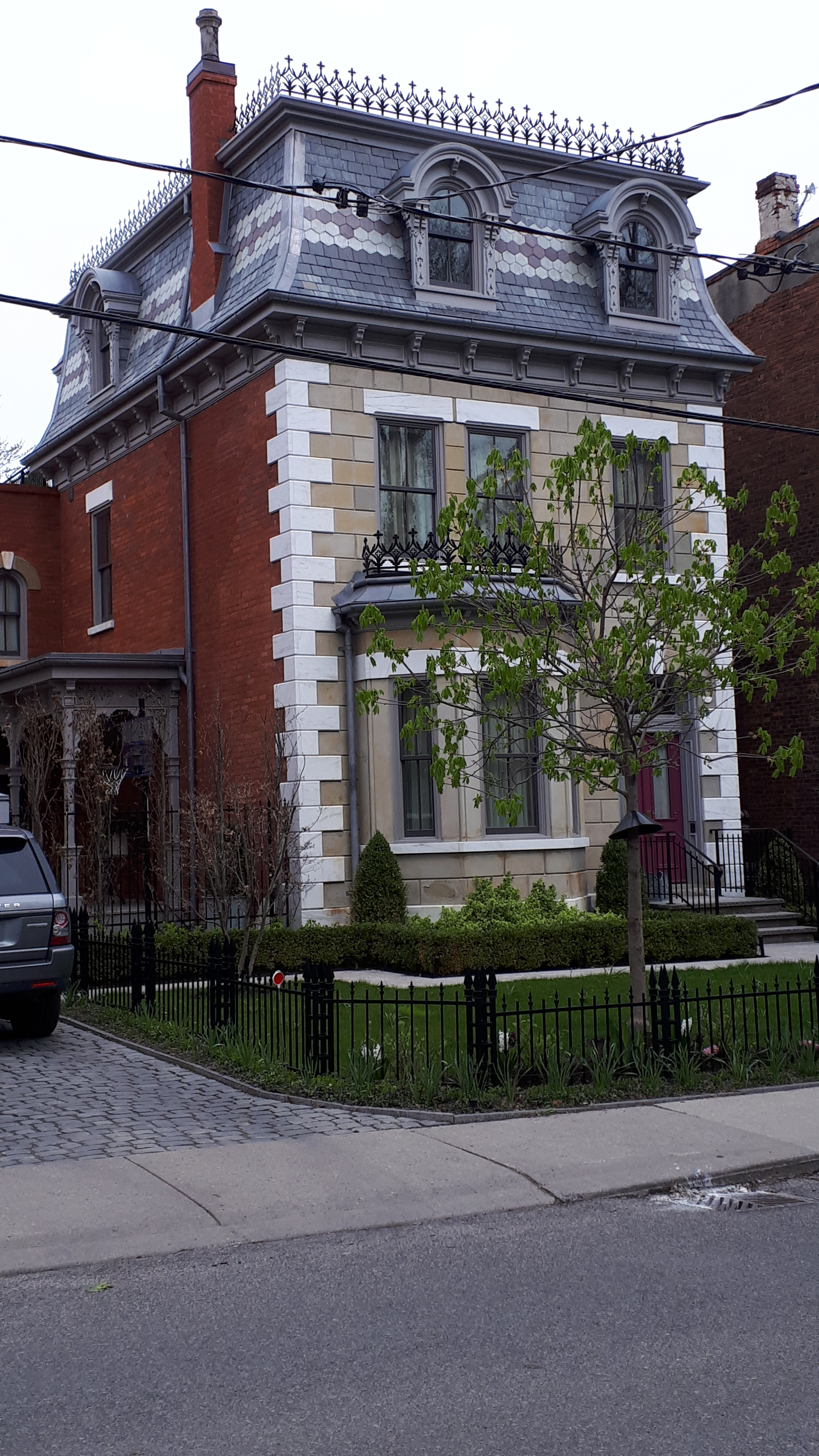
Francis Shields House, Toronto, Ontario

== See also ==
- Second Empire architecture in Europe
