= Basilica and Shrine of Our Lady of Perpetual Help =

Historic church in Massachusetts, United States

- The Mission Church
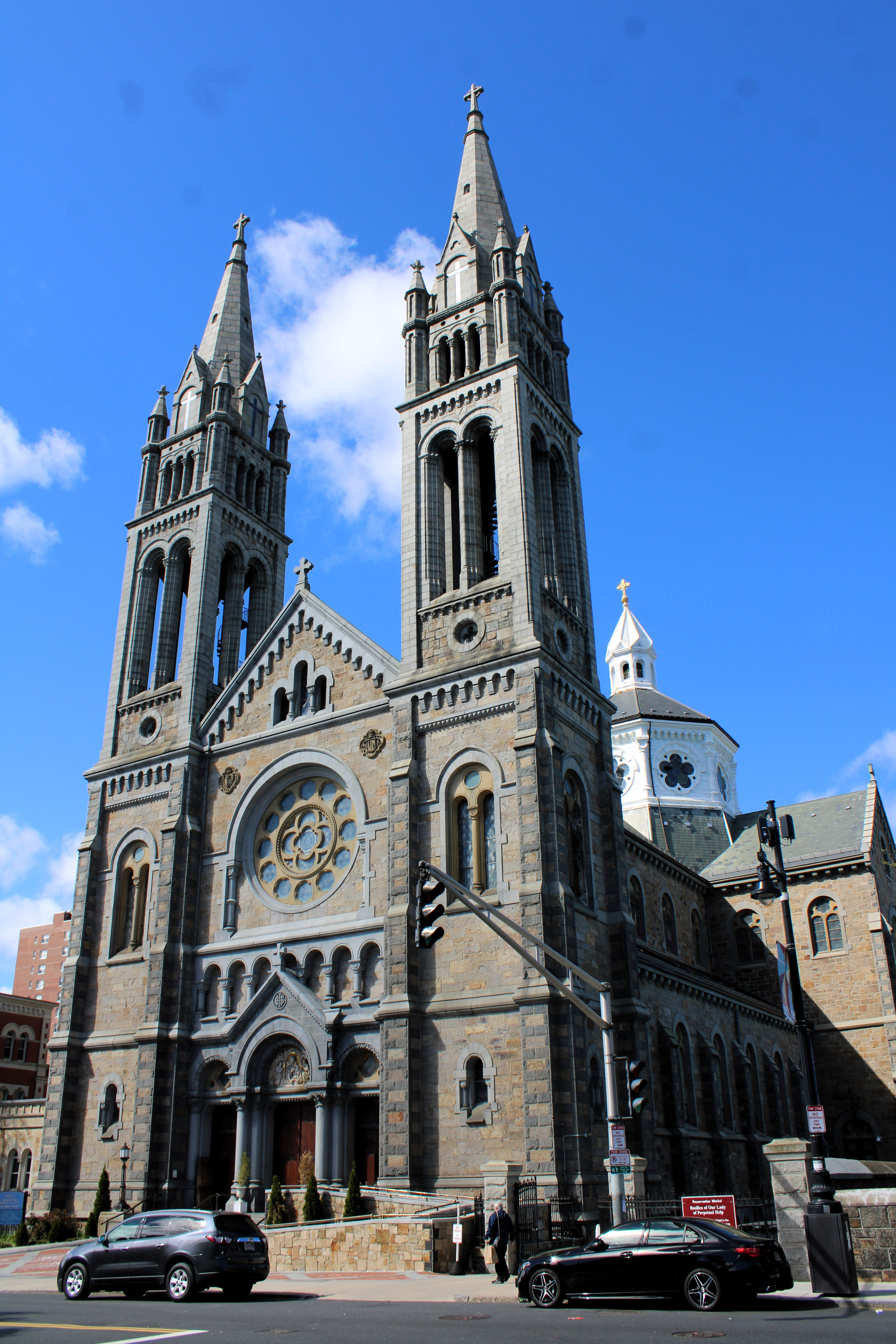
- Basilica and Shrine of Our Lady of Perpetual Help
- Location: 1545 Tremont Street; Boston, MA 02120
- Country: United States
- Denomination: Roman Catholic

History
- Status: Minor Basilica
- Dedication: Our Mother of Perpetual Help

Architecture
- Functional status: Active

Administration
- Archdiocese: Boston

Clergy
- Rector: Very Rev. Joseph Tizio, C.Ss.R Peter Krasinski
- Basilica and Shrine of Our Lady of Perpetual Help
- U.S. National Register of Historic Places
- Boston Landmark
- Location within Boston Location within Massachusetts Location within the United States
- Coordinates: 42°19′57.30″N 71°6′2.15″W
- Built: 1878, towers added 1910
- Architect: Schickel and Ditmars, towers by Franz Joseph Untersee
- Architectural style: Romanesque Revival, Gothic Revival
- NRHP reference No.: 89001747

Significant dates
- Added to NRHP: November 6, 1989
- Designated BOSL: August 10, 2004

The Basilica and Shrine of Our Lady of Perpetual Help (Latin: Basilicæ Minoris de Beatæ Maria Virginis de Perpetuo Succursu) informally known as The Mission Church is a Roman Catholic basilica in the Mission Hill neighborhood of Boston, Massachusetts, United States. The Redemptorists priests of the Baltimore Province have ministered to the parish since the church was first opened in 1870. The shrine is dedicated to the Blessed Virgin Mary under the title of Our Mother of Perpetual Help. Pope Pius XII raised the shrine to the status of Minor Basilica via his Pontifical Decree Ornatur Urbs et Archidiocesis on September 8, 1954.

== History ==
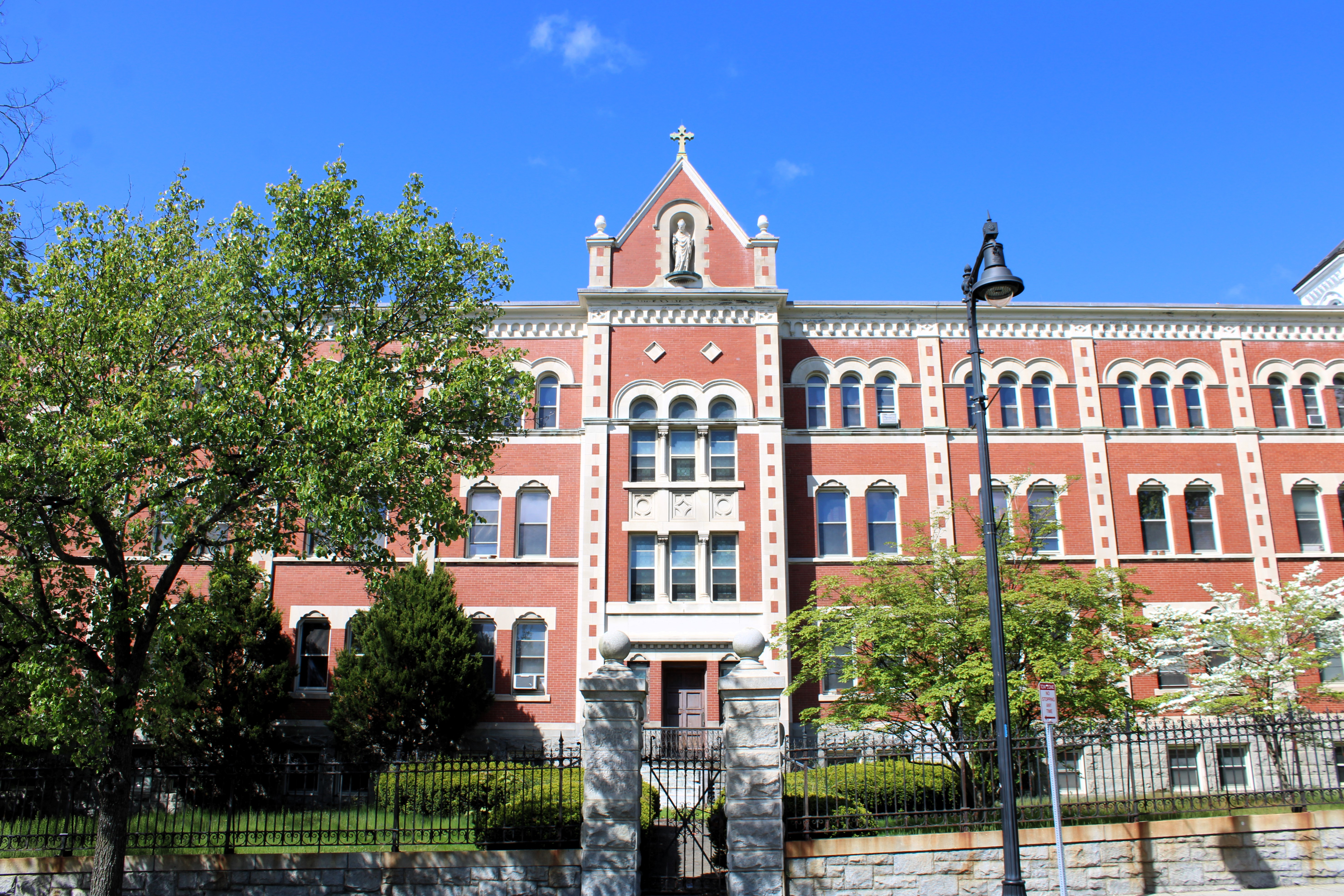
The rectory, site of the original church.

In May 1869, the Catholic priest, Father James Augustine Healy from the Church of Saint James in Boston invited the Redemptorists to give a parish mission. Pleased with the success of the mission, Healy recommended to the bishop that the Redemptorists should establish a mission-house in Boston. That year, Archbishop John J. Williams invited the Redemptorists to Boston. In September 1869 the Redemptorists acquired a site in Roxbury, then known as the Boston Highlands, on Parker Hill. Parker Hill was named for wealthy Boston merchant, John Parker, who occupied the summit of the hill during the eighteenth century. The five-acre estate was known as Brinley Place, and it included a grand house, Datchet House built in 1723 by prominent English officer Colonel Francis Brinley in memory of his ancestral home. Brinley died in 1765. Wealthy merchant Robert Pierpont purchased the house in 1773. Pierpont enlarged and enriched the house to such a degree that it became known as "Pierpont's Castle".

The Redemptorists built a modest wooden church on the location in 1870. This served as a "mission house", a home base for priests traveling to distant parts of Massachusetts, Canada, and elsewhere. The church was dedicated to Our Lady of Perpetual Help. The first Catholic Mass was offered on January 29, 1871. The original structure was located on the site where the rectory now stands.

== Building ==
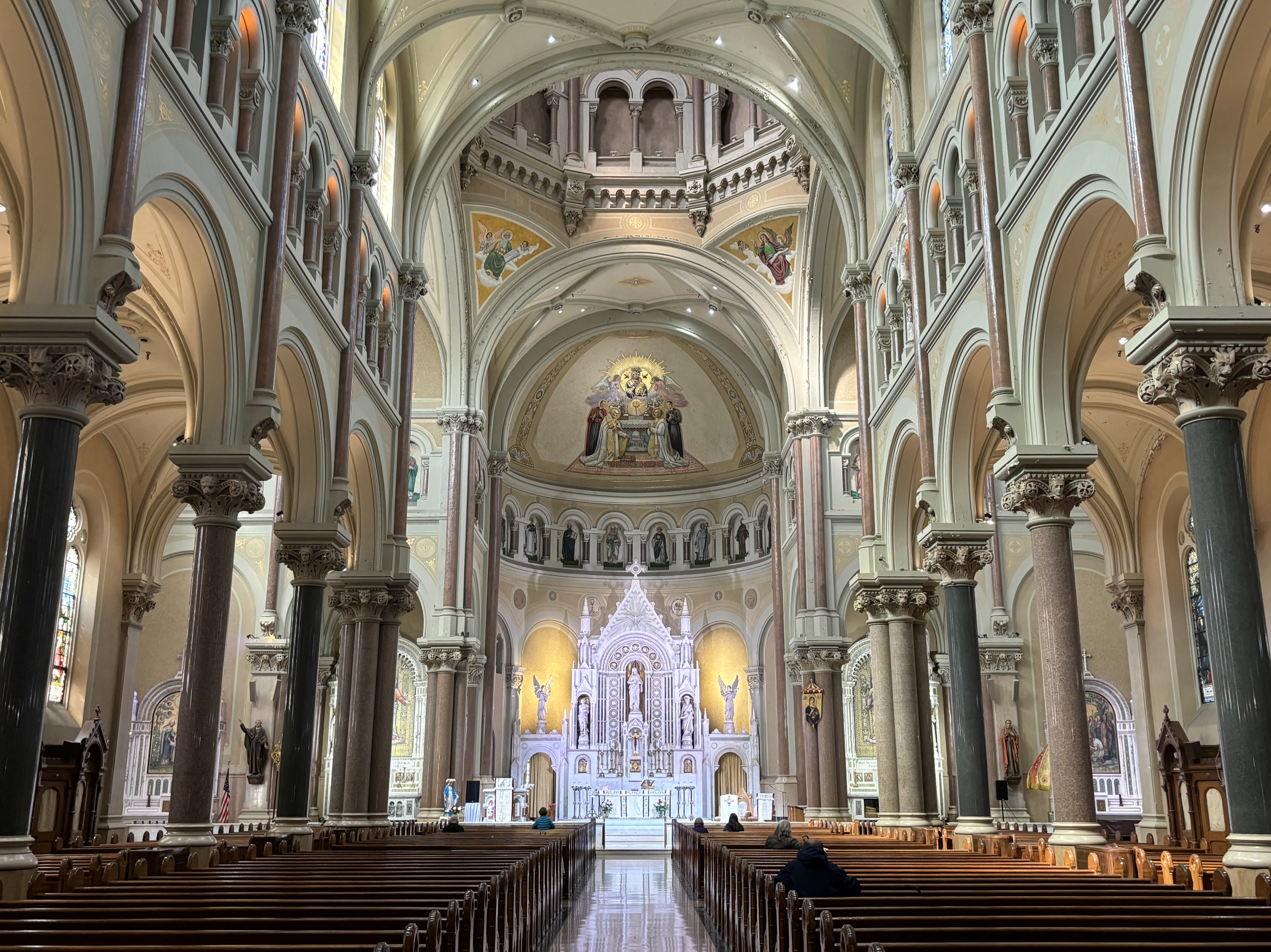
Interior of the Basilica

The current church was designed by J. William Schickel and Isaac E. Ditmars of New York. The congregation, then largely German, broke ground in 1874. The Mission Church was constructed in Romanesque style of Roxbury puddingstone, quarried from what is now Puddingstone Park, just down the street. An octagonal, cupola-topped lantern rises over a hundred feet above the crossing. The stained glass windows in the nave were made by F.X. Zettler, and the windows in the shrine were made by Franz Mayer and Co. of Munich. Side altars were dedicated to the Holy Family and St. Patrick. The church was dedicated in 1878. At this time the church was not an ordinary parish in which all sacraments were administered, but was instead limited to penance and Holy Communion. Our Lady of Perpetual Help became a parish of the Archdiocese of Boston in 1883.

The Hutchings organ was installed in 1897. It was one of the first organs in the US to successfully use electric action, which Hutchings invented and patented. The organ has 62 stops and close to 3,200 pipes.

The spires, added in 1910, were designed by Swiss architect Franz Joseph Untersee, who also designed the rectory. Due to the church's sloping foundation, the west cross tops its tower at 215 feet (66 m); the other spire is two feet shorter. The western tower houses twelve bells. The length of the church is also 215 feet (66 m). The church was elevated to basilica status in 1954 by Pope Pius XII. The church complex was designated a Boston Landmark by the Boston Landmarks Commission in 2004.

== Shrine of Our Lady of Perpetual Help ==
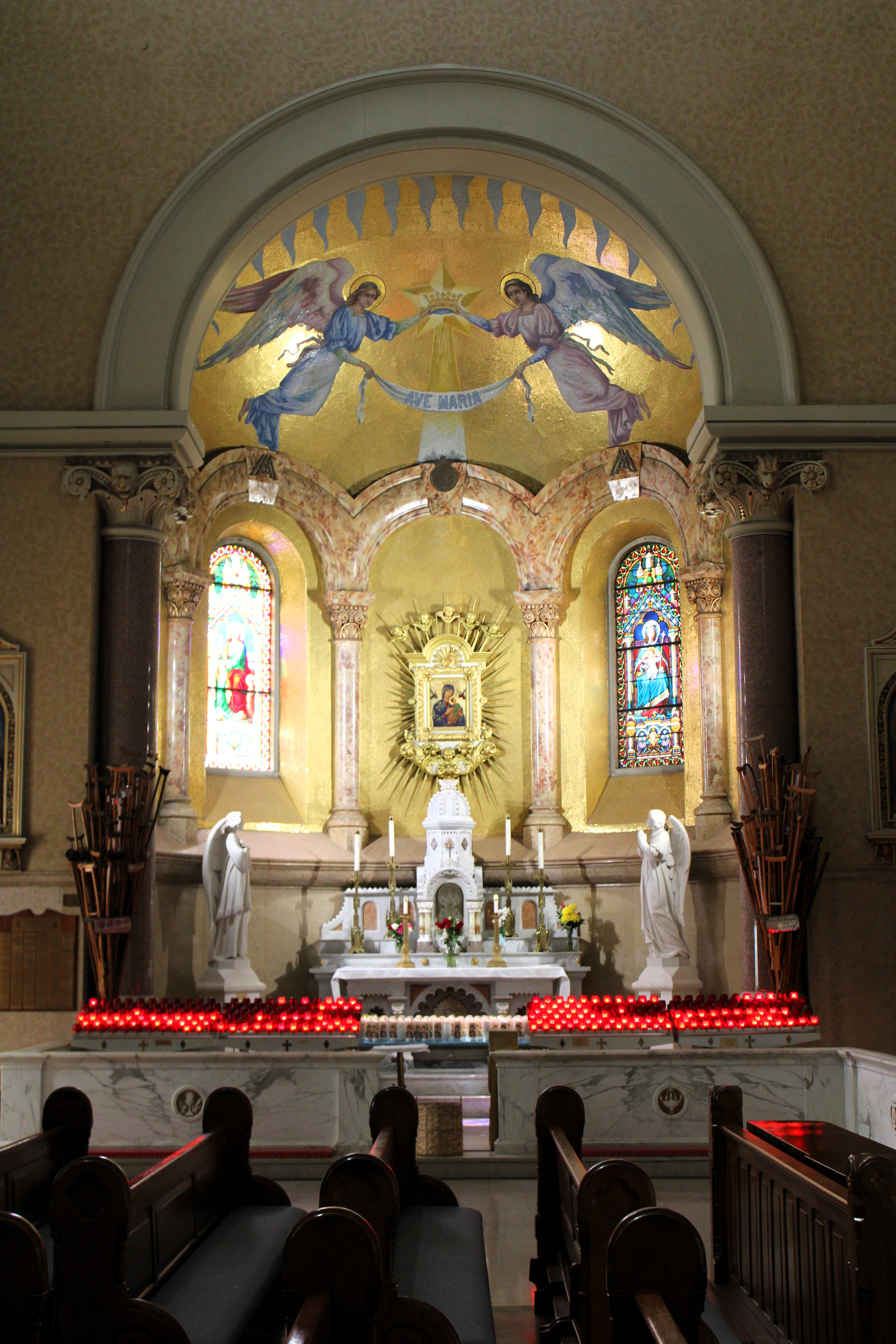
Our Lady of Perpetual Help shrine

A replica icon of Our Lady of Perpetual Help was installed over the main altar of the original church on May 28, 1871. Not long after, cures were reported, attributed to the intercession of Our Lady. In November 1874, the weekly practice of bestowing a blessing on the sick was established. When the new church was built, the icon was relocated to the new Chapel of Our Lady of Perpetual Help. As reputed cures continued to occur, crutches, braces, and other devices were left as votive offerings at the shrine. In 1900 Frawley began a quarterly publication, The Little Messenger of Mary, which included among other features accounts of favors received at the shrine. This was later superseded by the Annals of the Shrine of Our Lady of Perpetual Help.

An account of the sick flocking to the shrine was published in the New York Herald in March 1901, under the headline "A Lourdes in the Land of Puritans". Accounts of activities at the shrine were also covered by the Boston American General News of March 28, 1909, under the caption "Heaps of Crutches Left at Altar by Afflicted", and by the Boston Globe of December 10, 1910, and again in a Globe article of August 3, 1919. During World War I, the Roxbury shrine became popular with family members praying for the safe return of soldiers. Between 1878 and 1884 over 300 cures were documented.

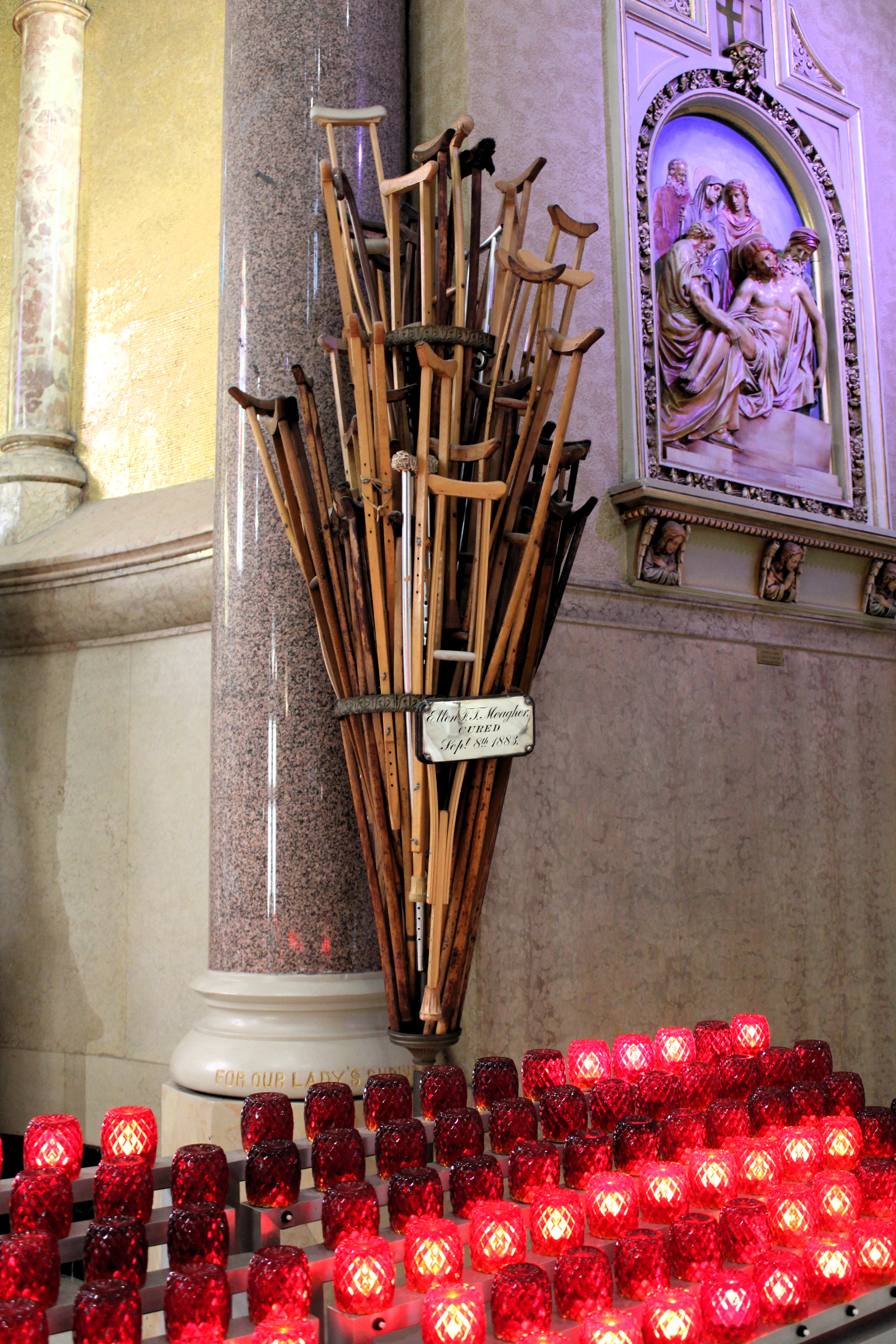
Crutches at the shrine

Mission Grammar School was completed in 1889, located behind the church on Smith Street, with 24 classrooms to accommodate 1,200 pupils. The School Sisters of Notre Dame arrived from Baltimore to educate the parish's boys and girls. Under the direction of the Xaverian Brothers, Mission Church High School opened in 1926. After 66 years, at the end of the school year in 1992, Mission Church High School was closed due to declining enrollment. The building was sold to the Boston Public School system and continues to be operated as New Mission High. The grammar school is currently located on St. Alphonsus Street and continues to educate children in K-8.

In 1900, St. Alphonsus Hall was opened as an early form of community center to serve a large immigrant population, most notably from Ireland. It housed a library, meeting hall, gym, bowling alley and theater. The Passion Play "Pilates Daughter" written by Rev. Francis Kenzel, C.Ss.R. was performed for the first time in St. Alphonsus Hall in 1902. With an all-female cast, the drama centers around the daughter of Pilate, Claudia, who threw a rose at Christ as he passed by carrying his cross. The flower touches Jesus and has miraculous powers that impact the lives of many. As a central attraction during Lent, parishioners acted out the play every year for over 50 years until performances ended in the late 1960s.

In 1903, the old Brinley Mansion was replaced by a new priests' residence. The rectory includes references to then Irish heritage of the neighborhood. The small chapel for resident Redemptorists has stained glass windows decorated with green shamrocks. The rectory also served as a house of formation for Redemptorist seminarians studying at Boston College and St. John's Seminary in Brighton until August 2017.

The basilica is located on Tremont Street, almost at the center of Mission Hill, a 0.75-square-mile (1.9 km^{2}) Boston neighborhood of approximately 18,000 people. The church is considered the symbol of the neighborhood, to which it gives its name. It continues to serve descendants of Irish immigrant families who still remain in the neighborhood, in addition to newly arrived immigrants from Ethiopia, Nigeria, and Haiti.

Senator Edward Kennedy's funeral took place there on August 29, 2009. He had often prayed at the church due to its proximity to the hospitals in the Longwood Medical Area of Boston, where he had visited sick and injured members of his family.

== See also ==
- List of churches in the Roman Catholic Archdiocese of Boston
- Our Lady of Perpetual Help, the shrine's namesake saint
- The Mission Hill neighborhood of Boston, MA, listed in the National Register of Historic Places
