= St. Monica Church (Manhattan) =

Coordinates: 40°46′20.16″N 73°57′6.74″W

Church of St. Monica
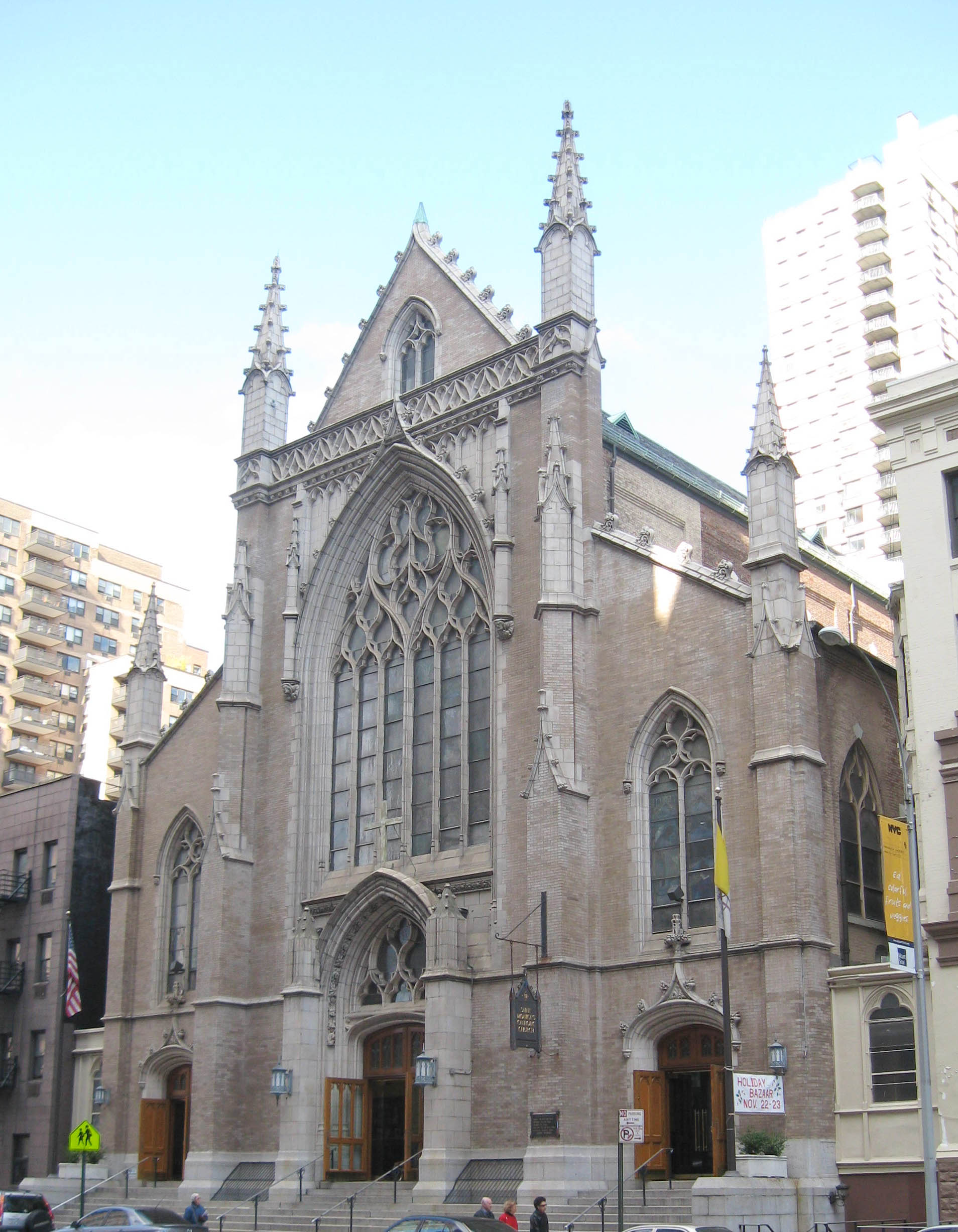
- Photographed in 2008
- Church of St. Monica
- Location: New York, New York
- Country: United States of America
- Denomination: Catholic Church
- Website: https://www.stelmo79.org/

Architecture
- Architect(s): Schickel & Ditmars (for church); Thomas Dunn of 37 West 57th Street (for 1926 school and convent); Brown-Guenther-Booss of 1860 Broadway (for 1955 convent)
- Style: Gothic Revival
- Groundbreaking: 1926 (school and convent); 1955 (convent)
- Construction cost: $120,000 (1926 school and convent) $275,000 (1955 convent)

Administration
- Archdiocese: Archdiocese of New York

The Church of St. Monica, commonly referred to as St. Monica's, is a parish church in the Roman Catholic Archdiocese of New York, located at 413 East 79th Street, Manhattan, New York City. The parish was established in 1879 and in 2015 merged with nearby St. Elizabeth of Hungary and St. Stephen of Hungary churches.

== History ==
The fourth Catholic parish on the Upper East Side, St. Monica's was founded by John Treanor, pastor of the Church of St. Lawrence O'Toole (now the Church of St. Ignatius Loyola). James J. Dougherty was appointed the first pastor, and in 1880 he began conducting Mass over a feed store at 404 East 78th Street. The following year, he purchased land for the construction of the church and school. Construction of the first church building was completed in 1883. In 1892, the address was listed as 409 East 79th Street.

John J. Boyle served as acting rector at St. Monica's before becoming the founding pastor of St. Luke's Church (Bronx, New York) in 1897.

In 2015, the Archdiocese of New York ordered St. Monica's merged with St. Elizabeth's and St. Stephen's to better serve 21st century Yorkville. The merged parish, which holds services at St. Monica's, is known as The Roman Catholic Parish of St. Monica, St. Elizabeth of Hungary, St. Stephen of Hungary. As a result of the merger, St. Monica's parish boundaries shifted slightly.

== Parish school ==
The parish school opened in 1883, operated by the Sisters of Charity of New York. The Sisters of St. Francis assumed operations in 1944. After several years of declining enrollment, the school was closed in 1974.

The Parish school is now St. Stephen of Hungary School, located just a few blocks away on 408 E 82 St.

== Buildings ==
The current Gothic Revival church building was erected in 1906 to the designs of Schickel & Ditmars, prominent church architects.

In 1926, the rector Arthur J. Kenny had a three- and four-story brick school and convent with tile roof built at 410 East 80th Street, to designs of Thomas Dunn for $120,000 ($2,180,000 in current dollar terms). A three-story convent at 405–413 East 79th Street was built in 1955 to designs by Brown-Guenther-Booss for $275,000 ($3,310,000 in current dollar terms).

== Pastors ==
- John Treanor (1879–1880)
- James J. Dougherty (1880–1890s)
- John J. Boyle (Acting Rector in 1890s)
- James P. Hughes was assigned here (presumably as assistant) in 1904; while William S. Creedan was transferred from here to St. Andrew's Church (Manhattan)
- Arthur J. Kenny (1920s)
- James Henry Ambrose Griffiths (1955–1964), auxiliary bishop
- Donald Baker (2015-present)
