= William G. Steinmetz =

German-American architect

- Born: c. 1838; Prussia
- Died: 27 April 1898; Buffalo, New York, U.S.
- Known for: Architect

Brigadier General William George Steinmetz AIA (c. 1838 – 27 April 1898) was a German-American architect who practiced in New York City as a founding associate of A.B. Mullet & Company with Alfred Bult Mullett (–1890) and Hugo Kafka (1843–1913) before the former founded Alfred B. Mullet & Sons, and the later formed William Schickel & Company

Steinmetz was born in Prussia and emigrated with his family when he was young. He enlisted in the Union Army when the Civil War broke out, rising through the ranks of the cavalry to become a brigadier general. He lost a leg at the Battle of Bull Run.

Steinmetz worked with noted Boston architect Paul Schulze (1827/28-1897) from 1875 to 1876.

In Mullet's firm, Steinmetz was the superintendent of construction of Mullet's famous Second Empire-style New York City Central Post Office (near City Hall, demolished 1939) but was dismissed in early 1877 a few months before a section of the mansard roof collapsed and killed four workers. Steinmetz had been replaced by Thomas A. Oakshott and "Mullet seized the opportunity to ascribe the accident to the dismissal of Steinmetz. A grand jury investigation into the accident revealed the roof truss had not been property bolted to the framing. Oakshott, neither an architect nor an engineer, was apparently uninformed to the construction or placement of the roof truss." Oakshott was dismissed and replaced by Thomas J. Jackson, an older architect.

William G. Steinmetz served on the board of trustees for the building of the Brooklyn Bridge. He also served as the comptroller for the City of Brooklyn.
