= Hugo Kafka =

American architect

- Born: 1843; Austrian Empire
- Died: 1915 (aged 71–72); New Rochelle, New York, United States
- Known for: Architect

Hugo Kafka, AIA, (May, 1843–April 1915) was a Czech-American architect and founding associate of the predecessor firm of Alfred B. Mullett & Sons, as well as William Schickel & Company; he ran his own firm, Hugo Kafka in the early twentieth century, later renamed Hugo Kafka & Sons.

== Life ==
Kafka was born in 1843 in the Austrian Empire. He graduated from the Polytechnikum in Zurich, Switzerland studying under Gottfried Semper. He came to Philadelphia, Pennsylvania in 1874 to work with Hermann Schwartzmann, architect-in-chief for the buildings of the Centennial Exposition, and practiced in New York City from 1877 to 1903." He became a Fellow of the American Institute of Architects in 1876 and a founding associate of the predecessor firm of Alfred B. Mullett & Sons, with Alfred B. Mullett and William G. Steinmetz in 1882. In 1885 along with J. William Schickel (1850–1907) and Isaac E. Ditmars (1850–1934), he was a founding associate of William Schickel & Company, which later became Schickel & Ditmars. He died April 28, 1913, in New Rochelle, New York. Working for himself in the twentieth century, his firm's address was at 99 Nassau Street; the firm's name was Hugo Kafka, and Hugo Kafka & Sons after 1905 at 34 W 26th Street.

One of his finest house designs is the Leonard and Annie Wiederer House (1887–1888), 387 St. Paul's Avenue (formerly Mud Lane), Staten Island, a three-story 4,500-square-foot (420 m^{2}) Queen Anne-style mansion of 24-room, including eight bedrooms, two kitchens and six fireplaces, each of a different design. It was built by the German-born beer baron named George Bechtel as a bridal gift to his daughter Annie on her marriage to Leonard Wiederer.

He died April 28, 1915, aged 70, at his home at 49 Washington Avenue, New Rochelle, New York.

== Works ==
- Leonard and Annie Wiederer House (1887–1888), 387 St. Paul's Avenue, Staten Island
- 153-155 West 43rd Street (1903), a 12-story brick and stone hotel, built for the estate of Ogden Goelet for $210,000
- West 176th Street, west of Amsterdam Avenue (1905), four five-story brick and stone tenements built for Winslow Realty Co. for $160,000.
- Mill
- "The Summersby" (1894), 342-344 West 56th Street, 7-story brick and limestone flats
