= J. William Schickel =

American architect

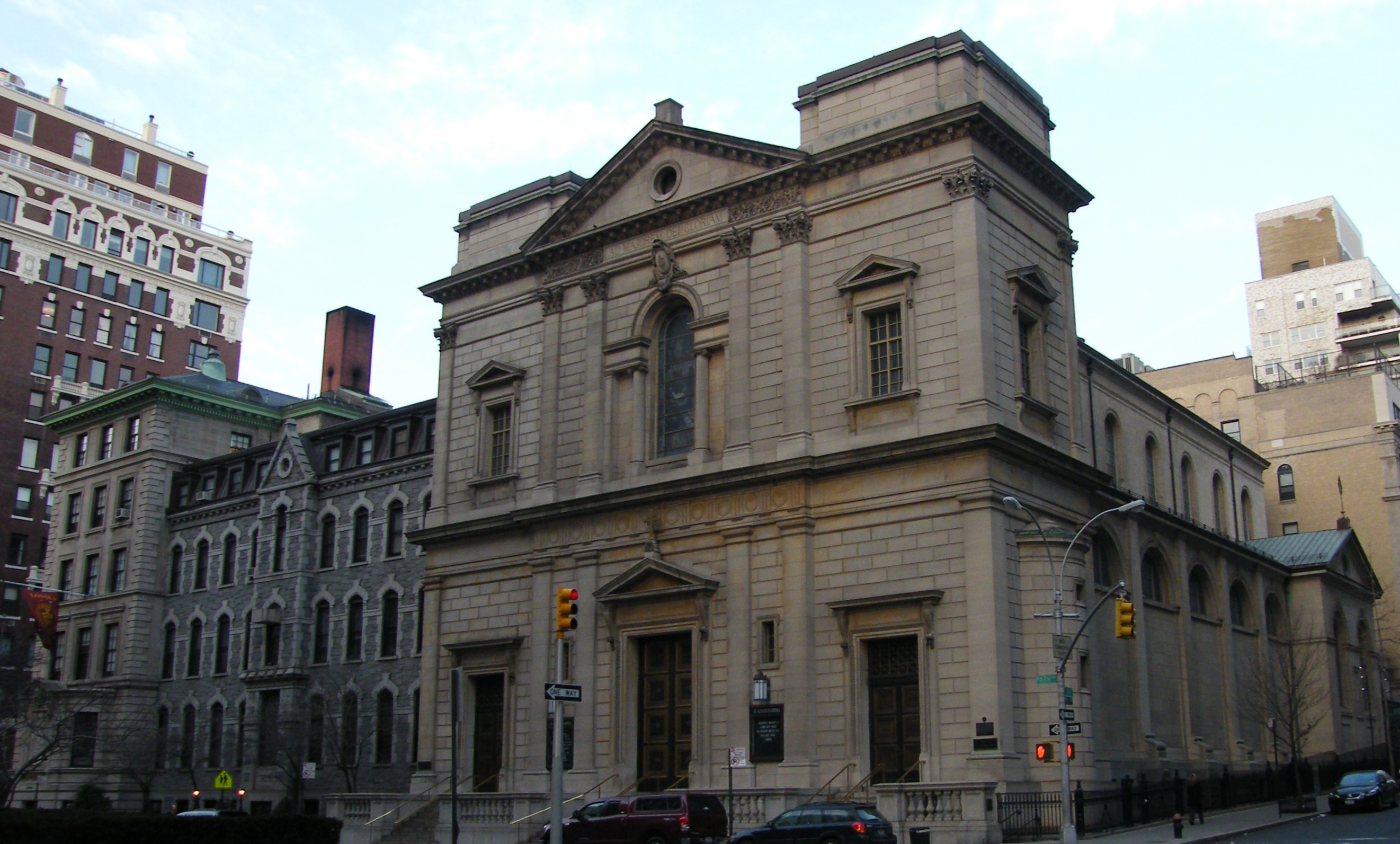
- Church of St. Ignatius Loyola, 980 Park Avenue, New York, New York
- Born: January 29, 1850; Wiesbaden, Hochbein, Germany
- Died: June 14, 1907 (aged 57)
- Known for: Architect

J. William Schickel, FAIA, (1850–1907) known professionally as William Schickel, was a German-American architect and founder of the New York architectural firm of Schickel & Ditmars.

== Life and practice ==
Schickel was born January 29, 1850, in Wiesbaden, Hochbein, Germany. He was a student of Wilhelm Bozler. In 1870, at the age of twenty, he emigrated to the United States, passing through Castle Garden in New York City, and the next day started his New York architectural career in the offices of the renowned Richard Morris Hunt. He became a member and a Fellow of the American Institute of Architects in 1894. In 1885 he formed William Schickel & Company in association with Isaac E. Ditmars (1850–1934) and Hugo Kafka (1843–1913). He died June 14, 1907, in New York City. Following his death, Ditmars continued the firm.

== Works ==
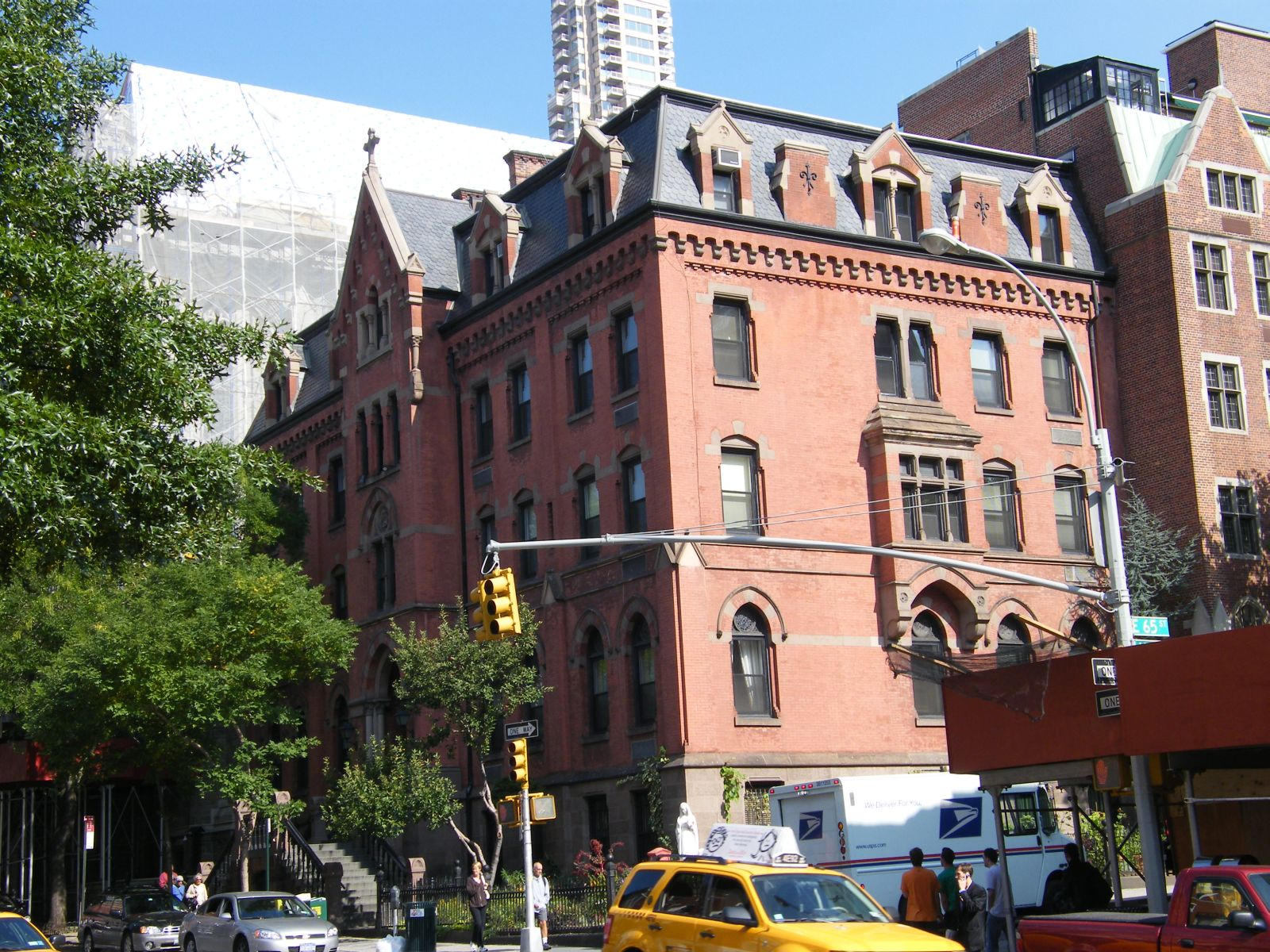
St. Vincent Ferrer Priory on south side

The John Crimmins House at 40 East 68th Street was the German-born Schickel's first commission in New York.

Schickel was hired in 1879 to design and build a replacement for the original 1867 chapel of the Church of St. Vincent Ferrer. The church was known as the "Gothic Barn" and was demolished in 1914. Along with this commission came one to build a priory that would serve as the provincial headquarters for the Dominicans in New York. The priory's intricate use of materials and its overall polychromy, characteristics of the High Victorian Gothic style popular in the late 19th century, reflect Schickel's training in Bavaria and the strong influence there of Friedrich von Gärtner. It was the first of many buildings Schickel would design for the New York diocese. The priory still stands.

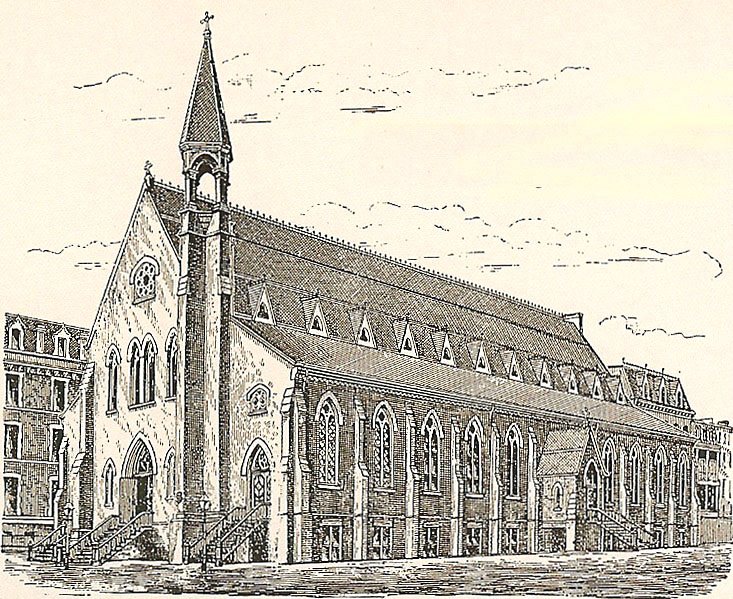
The first Church of St. Vincent Ferrer, known as the "Gothic barn"

Among Schickel's most celebrated works were the impressive German-Baroque edifice of St. Ignatius of Loyola (1898), now on the National Register of Historic Places , and the Neo-Gothic St. Louis's Church (1889) in Buffalo, New York, with elements of French and German Gothic design including a pierced spire influenced by Cologne Cathedral. His firm had long-standing ties to leading German-American families and the Roman Catholic Church, principally building churches and ecclesiastical complexes in German-American neighborhoods. Among many other church structures in the United States, Schickel was the architect of the Most Holy Trinity Church, 138 Montrose Ave., Brooklyn, New York. The cornerstone of Most Holy Trinity was placed in 1882 and after three years of construction the church was opened in 1885. Schickel also designed the massive St. Joseph Seminary, Dunwoodie, NY, begun 1893 and taking five years to complete.

== Partial list of solo works ==
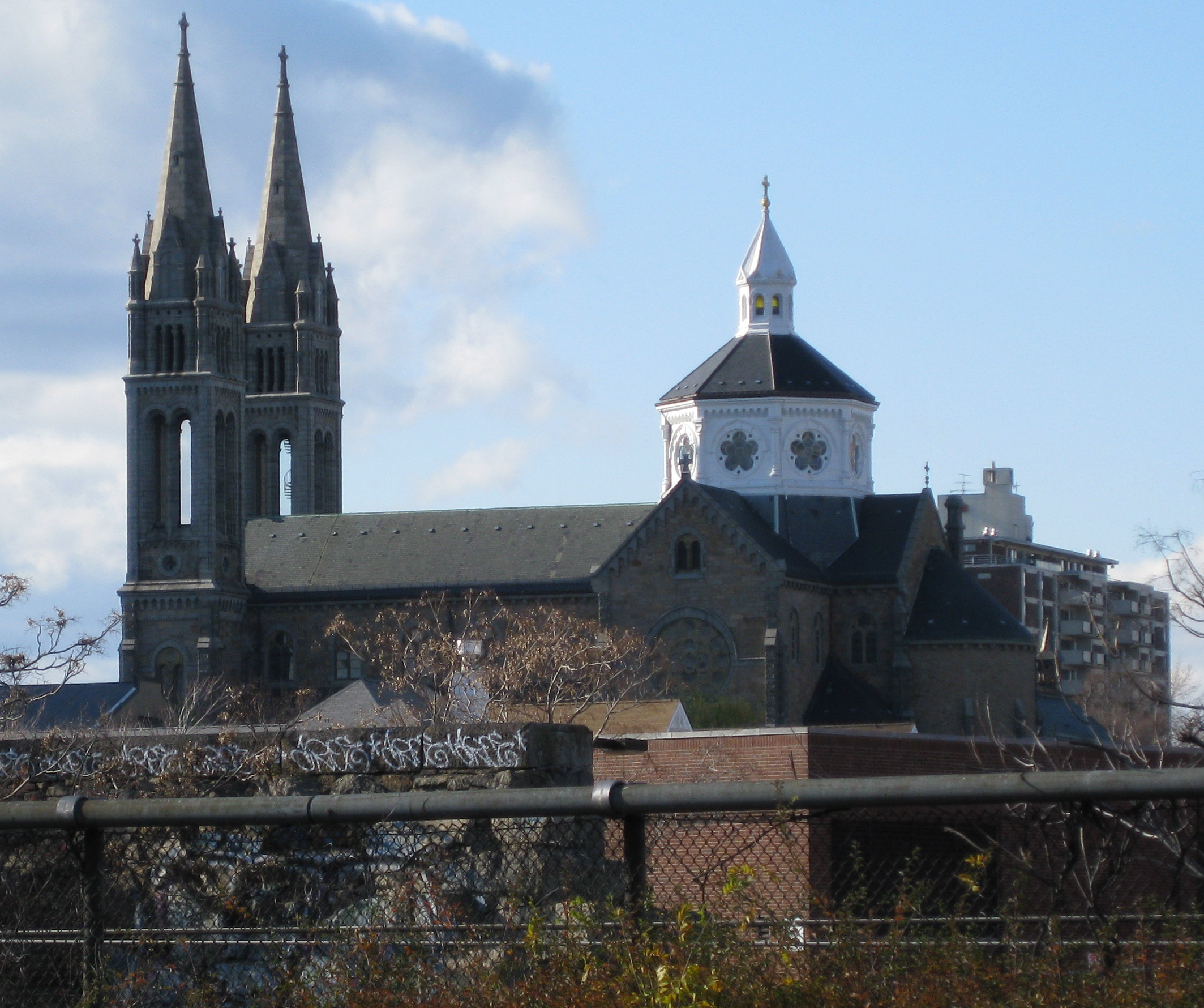
Basilica and Shrine of Our Lady of Perpetual Help, Boston

For work done with William Schickel & Company (1885) and Schickel & Ditmars (1885-1907), see Schickel & Ditmars

- The Staats-Zeitung Building, 17 Chatham Street (Park Row), New York City, New York (1873, demolished 1907 for the New York Municipal Building)
- Our Lady of Sorrows School, 219 Stanton Street, New York City, New York (1874)
- St. Francis Church, Monastery, and School, Milwaukee, Wisconsin (1877), National Register of Historic Places
- Basilica of Our Lady of Perpetual Help, Boston, (1874-8), better known as Mission Church (in association with Edward Welby Pugin) National Register of Historic Places
- The John D. Crimmins, Esq., Residence, 40 East 68th Street, New York City, New York (1878-9)
- Old Church of St. Vincent Ferrer (New York City) and Priory, New York City, New York (1879, demolished 1914, priory extant)
- Century Building (17th Street, Manhattan), 33 East 17th Street, New York City, New York (1880-1), National Register of Historic Places, New York City Landmark
- Dry Goods Building for Richard Arnold, 27-33 West 23rd Street, New York City, New York (1880-1)
- William Schickel House, 52 E 83rd Street, New York City, New York (1881-2), National Register of Historic Places
- Robert L. Stuart House, 871 Fifth Avenue, NE Corner of 68th Street and Fifth Avenue, New York City, New York (1882-3), demolished 1942
- Convent of the Sisters of Bon Secours of Troyes, France, 1197 Lexington Avenue, New York City, New York (1882), demolished c. 1985
- Most Holy Trinity Roman Catholic Church, 138 Montrose Avenue, Brooklyn, New York (1882-1890)
- The Constable Building Annex, 9-13 East 18th Street, New York City, New York (1883-4)
- Stables for Adolph Kutroff Residence, 153 East 69th Street (1883-4)
- August Richard House, 12 East 69th Street, New York City, New York (1883-4), new facade in 1913 by W.W. Bosworth, gut renovation in 2006.
- The German Library and Dispensary 135-137 Second Avenue, New York City, New York (1883-4), National Register of Historic Places, New York City Landmark
- Alumni Hall, Seton Hall University, South Orange, New Jersey (1884)
- Isaac & Virginia Stern House, 835 Madison Avenue, New York City, New York (1884-1885)

== See also ==
- Schickel & Ditmars
- William Schickel (artist), grandson of J. William Schickel who also designed liturgical spaces
