= Martin J. Scott =

Martin J. Scott SJ
- Born: 1865; New York City, New York, United States of America
- Died: November 29, 1954 (aged 88–89); New York City, New York, United States of America

Academic background
- Education: College of the Holy Cross (AB); Woodstock College (MA)

Martin Jerome Scott SJ (1865 – November 29, 1954) was an American priest of the Society of Jesus of the Roman Catholic Church and author of a number of books, pamphlets, and articles.

== Life ==
Scott was born in 1865 in New York City. He attended Assumption Academy in Utica, New York, between 1872 and 1879 and Utica Academy from 1879 to 1883; afterwards, he studied at College of the Holy Cross, where he received his bachelor's degree after a year. On August 15, 1884, he entered the Jesuit novitate at Manresa-on-Hudson, completing his novitate and studies in the city of Frederick, Maryland, between 1885 and 1888. Scott served as a professor of Latin at College of the Holy Cross between 1891 and 1893, and later as an educator at St. Francis Xavier College, before beginning theological studies at Woodstock College in 1896; he was ordained a priest there by James Gibbons in June 1899.

From 1902 to 1915, Fr. Scott was associated with the Church of St. Ignatius Loyola in Yorkville, Manhattan; being in charge of the Altar Boys and the Boy's Choir. In 1905, he took charge of the supervision of the Young Ladies Sodality. In 1910, he directed the construction of a Day Nursery and facilitated the organization of the Ladies Auxiliary Society. He briefly served as a lecturer at Boston College, and then served as assistant pastor at Immaculate Conception Church in Boston. He later served as a lecturer in apologetics at Fordham University, and also as a religious instructor at St. Francis Xavier College.

While in Boston, Fr. Scott had begun to write, publishing over 20 volumes of work; it was reported in 1946 that his books had sold over a million copies. He died at Saint Vincent's Hospital in New York City on November 29, 1954.

== Selected works ==
- God and myself: an inquiry into the true religion (1917)
- The Hand of God: A Theology for the People (1918)
- Convent life: the meaning of a religious vocation (1920)
- Credentials of Christianity (1920)
- You and Yours: Practical Talks on Your Home Life (1921)
- A Boy Knight (1921)
- Mother Machree: A Novel (1922)
- The Divine Counsellor (1922)
- What ails the world (article - North American Review, September 1922)
- You and Yours: Practical Talks on Home Life (1923 2nd edition of 1921 book)
- Man (1923)
- For Better for Worse: A Novel (1923)
- Christ or Chaos (1924)
- Kelly: A Novel (1924)
- The Virgin Birth (1925)
- Evolution (1925)
- Catholics and the Ku Klux Klan (article - North American Review, Summer 1926)
- Religion and Common Sense (1926)
- Isaac Jogues: missioner and martyr : an adaptation of the original biography of Martin-Shea (1927)
- Things Catholics Are Asked About (1927)
- Father Scott's radio talks, 1927–1928, station WLWL (1928)
- The Holy Sacrifice of the Mass (1928)
- Upstream (1929) Novel
- Christs Own Church (1930)
- Christ, True God (1930)
- Marriage (1930 and 1941)
- The Altar Boys of St. John's (1931) Novel
- Happiness (1931)
- What Use is Faith (1932)
- Faith and Conduct (1932)
- why Catholics Believe (1932)
- Religious Certainty (1933)
- The Church and the World (1934)
- Courtship and Marriage (1934)
- The Glories of the Catholic Church (with E.T. O'Dwyer, 1935)
- Marriage Problems (1935)
- What is Heaven (1936)
- Catholic Pamphlets (1938)
- Answer Wisely (1938)
- Teacher's Manual for Answer Wisely (1938)
- Introduction to Catholicism (1939)
- Jesus as men saw him (1940)
- Hundreds of Churches: But Only One is Christ's (1941)
- No Pope Can be Wrong in Teaching Doctrine (1941)
- Science Helps the Church: The Church Favors Science (pamphlet, 1941)
- They Said He Blasphemed, He Said He was the Son of God: What Say You of Jesus Christ? (pamphlet, 1941)
- This is my Body: the Sacrifice of the Mass (1941)
- Prove There's a Soul that Will Live Forever (pamphlet, 1941)
- God Forgives Sins: Why Confess to a Priest (pamphlet, 1942)
- Divorce is a Disease which Destroys Marriage (pamphlet, 1944)
- The Soul of Man (1945)
- Have You a God?: What is He Like (1945)
- Only One Church, Christ's Church (1945)
- The Infallible Pope (1945)
- This is My Body (1945)
- He Said He was the Son of God (1945)
- The Church the Champion of Science (1946)
- All you who are burdened (1946)
- Matthew, Mark, Luke and John - Were They Fooled, Did They Lie? (1946)
- Catholicism: Preserver of Christianity (pamphlet, 1950)
- The Life Work of the Nuns of the Good Shepherd (1900)
