= St. Louis Roman Catholic Church =

Church in Buffalo, New York, United States

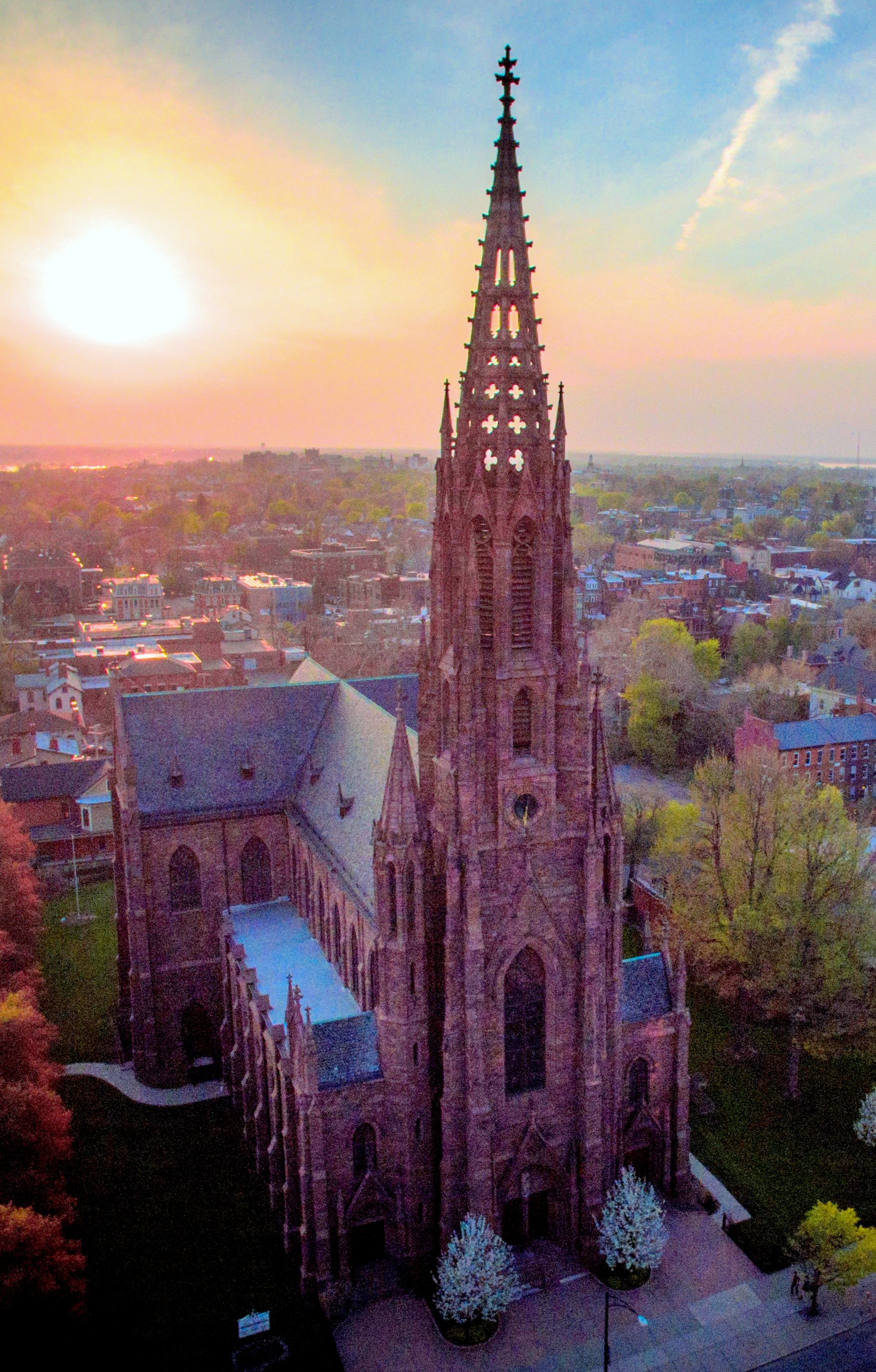
- St. Louis Roman Catholic Church
- 42.895428°N 78.871729°W
- Location: 35 Edward Street, Buffalo, New York
- Country: United States
- Denomination: Roman Catholic
- Website: stlouisrcchurch.org

History
- Status: Parish church
- Consecrated: 1913

Architecture
- Functional status: "Active"
- Architect: Schickel & Ditmars
- Style: Gothic Revival
- Completed: 1889

Specifications
- Capacity: 2000
- Length: 234 feet (71.3 m)
- Width: 134 feet (40.8 m)
- Height: 245 feet (74.7 m)
- Materials: Medina sandstone

Clergy
- Pastor: Salvatore Manganello

Saint Louis Roman Catholic Church is the oldest Catholic parish in Buffalo, New York. It was the first Catholic church built in Buffalo, and holds the title of "Mother Church of the Roman Catholic Diocese of Buffalo".

== History ==
The parish was established January 5, 1829 with land contributed by Louis Stephen LeCouteulx de Caumont (), a French nobleman. The first church, constructed of logs, was completed in 1831. The congregation was largely French, German and Irish. In 1837, the Irish members left to establish St. Patrick's Church, at Washington and Clinton. A larger brick church on the same site was completed in 1843. In 1846 a large group of the French congregants withdrew to form their own parish. Among the German parishioners left were prosperous and highly respected businessmen.

The church was destroyed by fire in 1885, setting the stage for the construction of the current church in 1889.

== Architecture ==
The historic Gothic Revival third church is located at 35 Edward Street. The church is laid out in a Latin-cross floor plan and features a 245 ft octagonal Medina sandstone steeple with a Seth Thomas clock. Above the steeple rests a 72 ft pierced spire; reputed to be the tallest open-work spire ever built completely of stone (without reinforcement) in USA.

Inside the church is a 1903 Kimball Organ, which is located in the choir loft.

In 1958, due to erosion of the masonry, the turret was rebuilt. Restoration was done on the transept entry in 2003.

Major structural events:

== Gallery ==
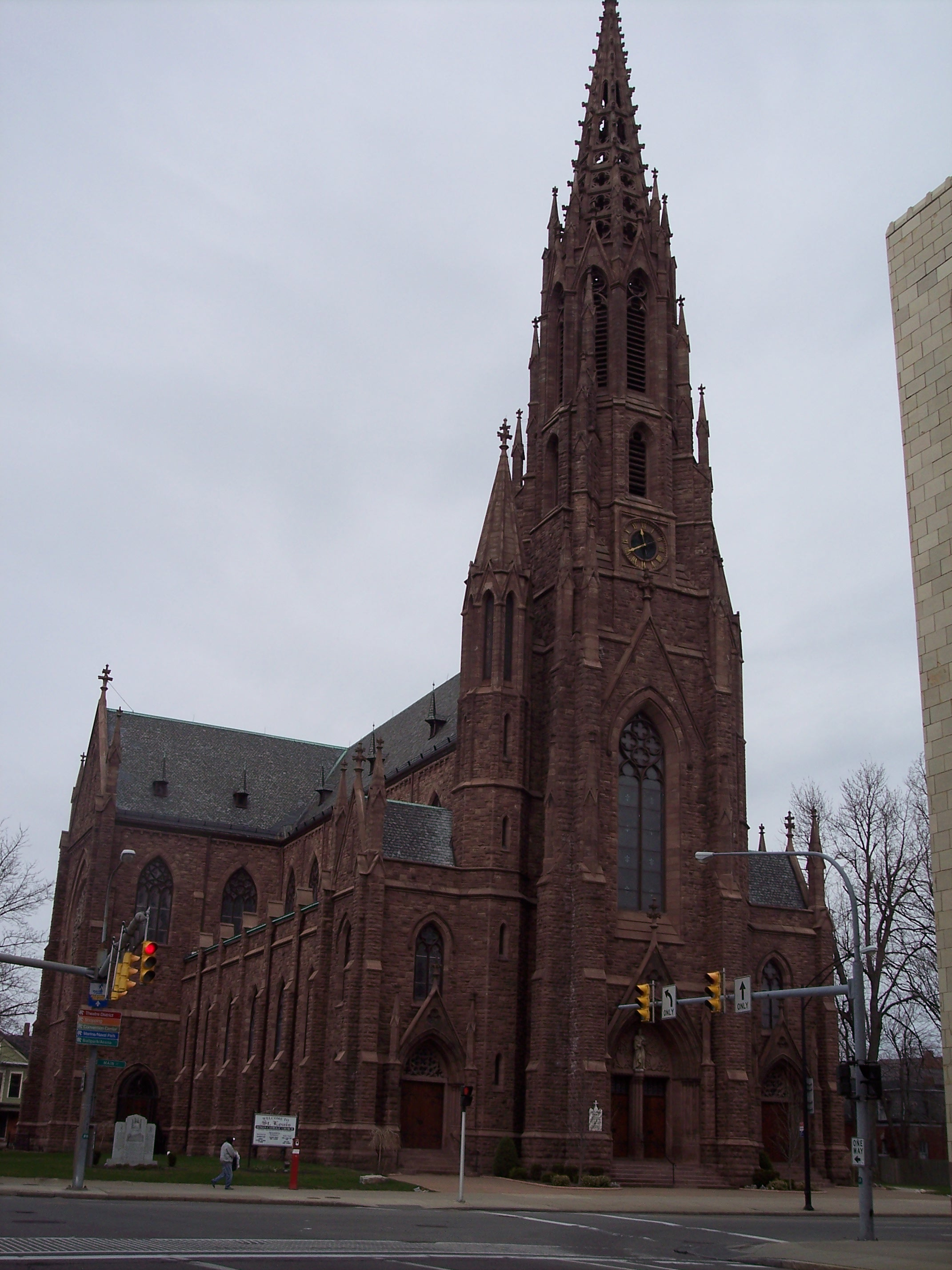
Front outside View

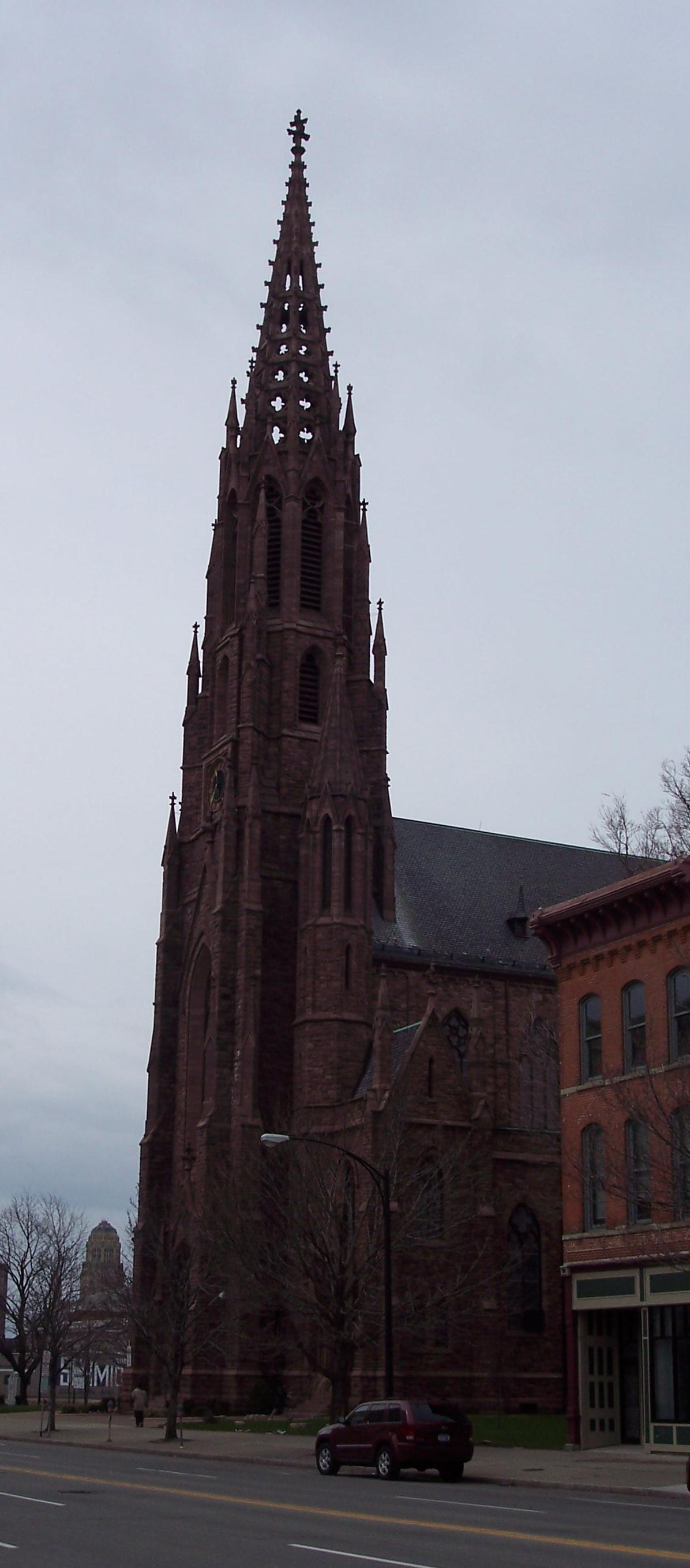
View looking down main street

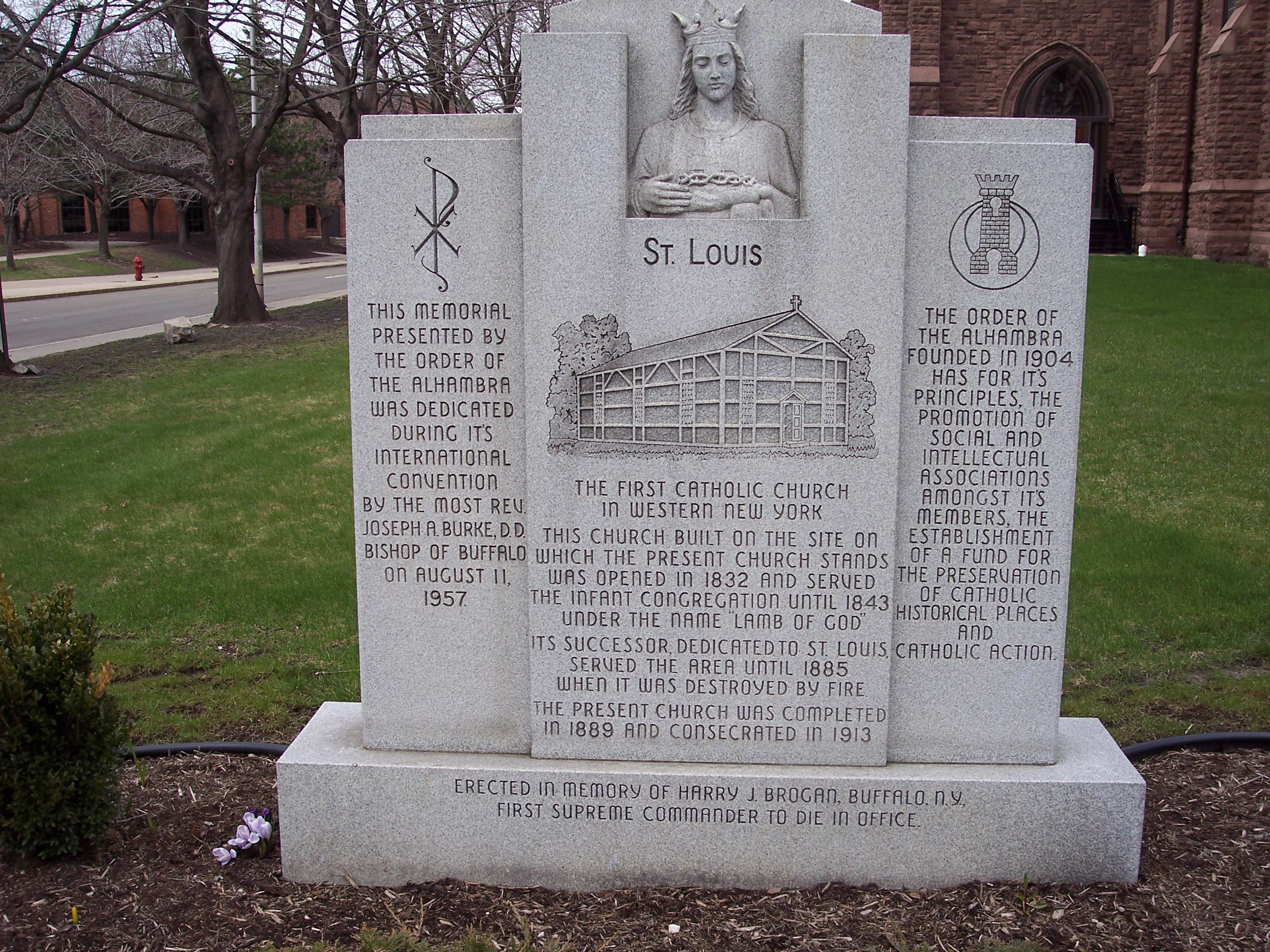
Stone monument at Saint Louis Roman Catholic

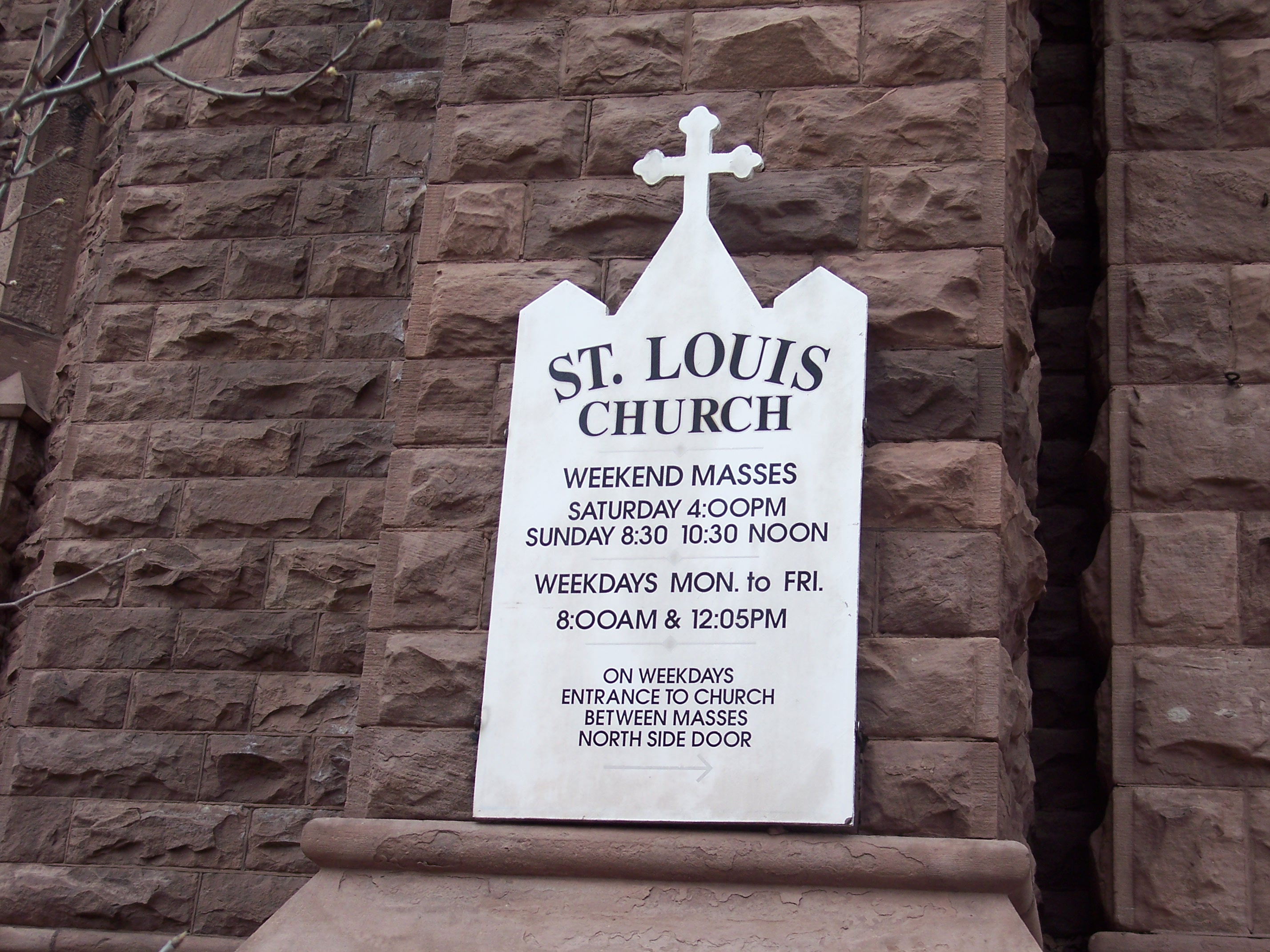

Saint Louis Church in 1914 publication

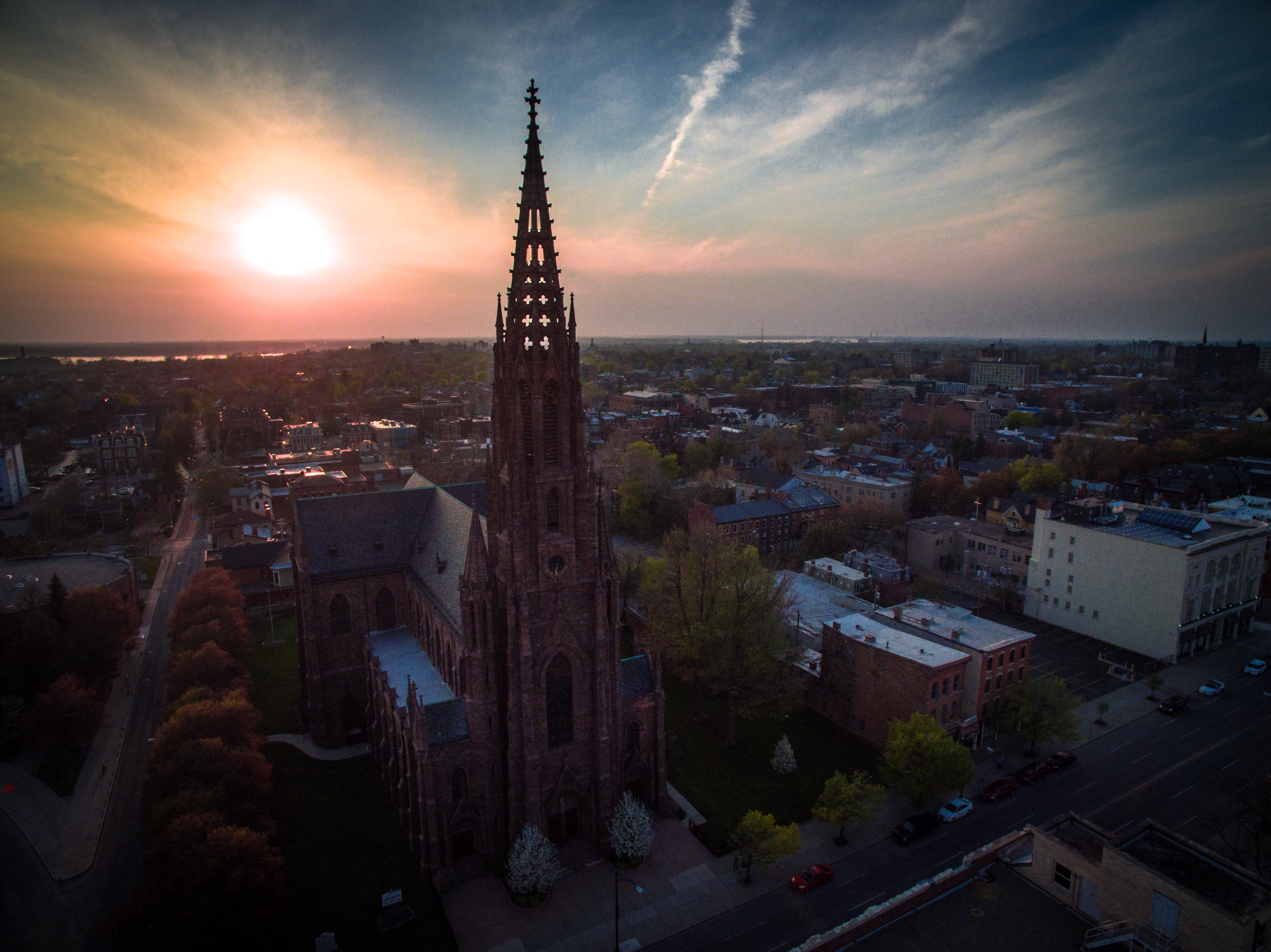
St. Louis Roman Catholic Church from Air

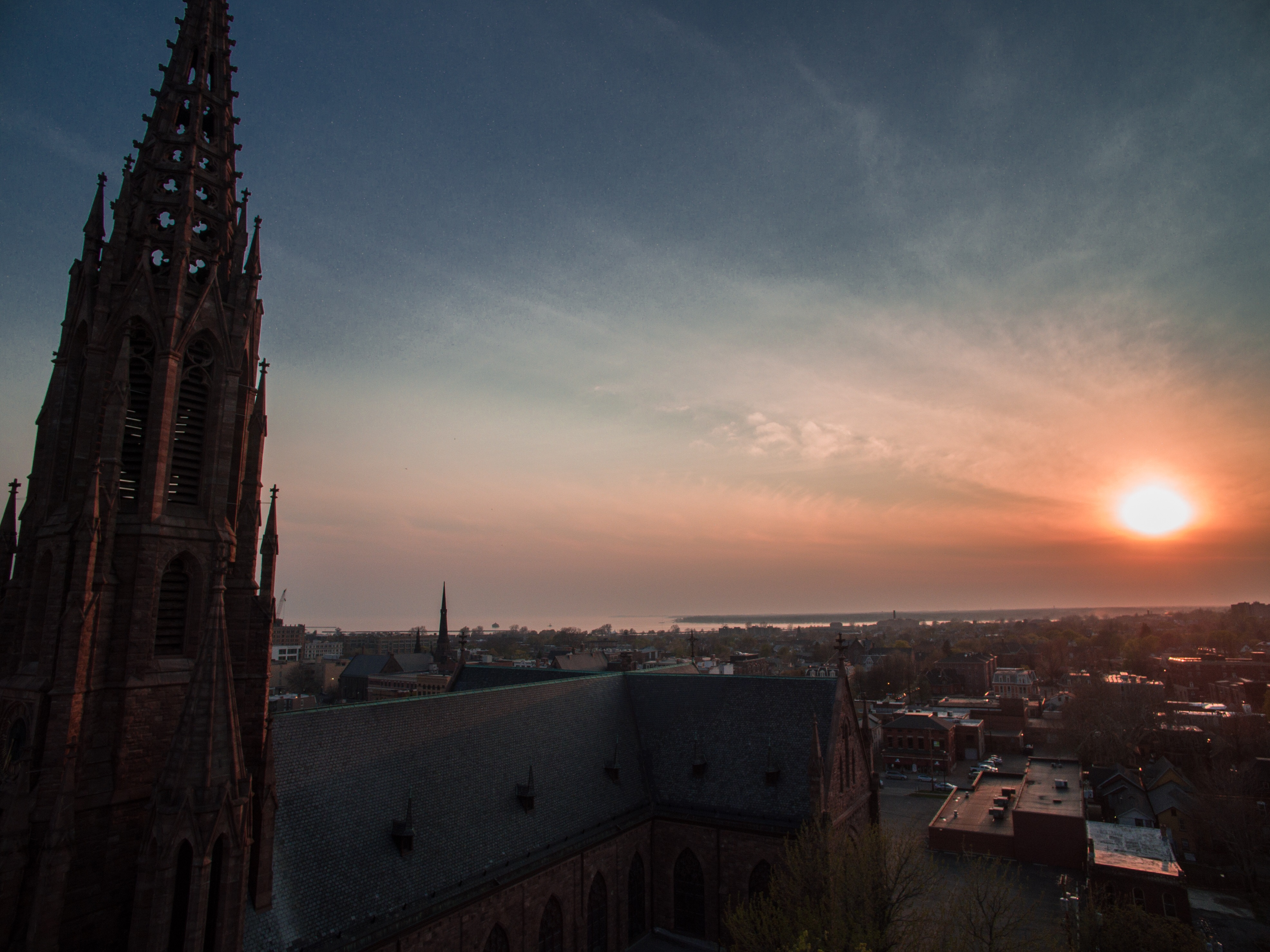
St. Louis Roman Catholic Church from Air
