= Loyola School (New York City) =

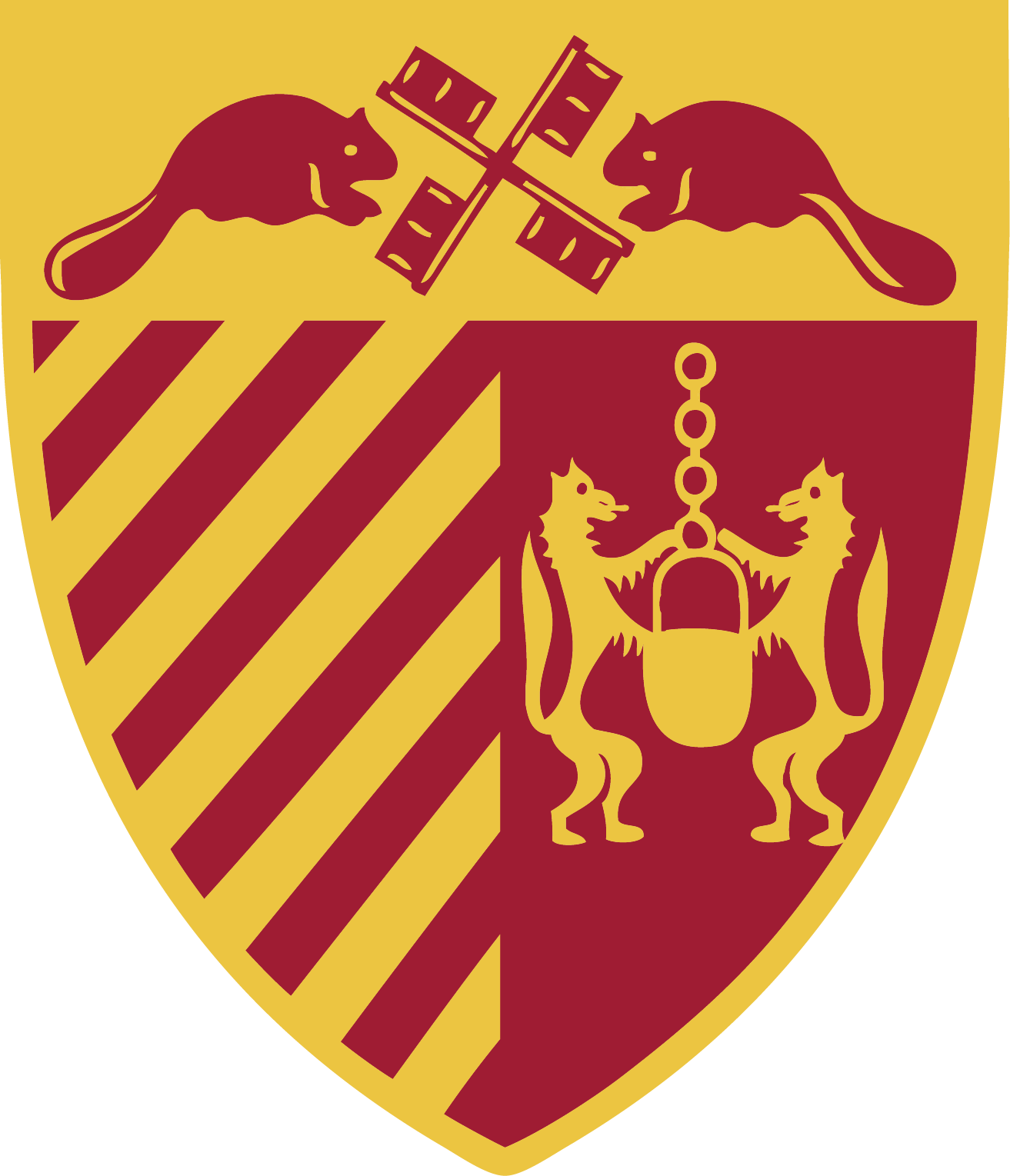

- Loyola School, located on East 83rd Street and Park Avenue, is on the National Register of Historic Places.

Location
- 980 Park Avenue (Upper East Side, Manhattan); New York City, New York 10028; United States; 40°46′43″N 73°57′31.5″W

Information
- School type: Private, independent Catholic co-educational college-preparatory high school
- Motto: Challenge. Inspire. Transform.
- Religious affiliation: Roman Catholic (Jesuit)
- Patron saint: Ignatius of Loyola
- Established: 1900 (126 years ago)
- Principal: James DeAngelo
- Faculty: approximately 30
- Grades: 9–12
- Gender: Coeducational
- Enrollment: 200-210
- Campus: National Register of Historic Places
- Campus type: Urban
- Colors: Maroon and Gold
- Athletics conference: New York City Athletic League
- Sports: Baseball, basketball, cross country, golf, soccer, softball, track and field, volleyball
- Mascot: Knight
- Team name: Knights
- Accreditation: New York State Association of Independent Schools
- Newspaper: The Blazer
- Website: loyolanyc.org

Loyola School is a private college preparatory school on the Upper East Side of the Manhattan borough of New York City, founded in 1900 by the Society of Jesus. It is located two city blocks east of Central Park and Museum Mile on 83rd Street and Park Avenue.

Originally a boys' school, it became co-educational in 1973, becoming the only Jesuit co-educational college preparatory high school in the tri-state area. The school has a student enrollment of two hundred, with an average class size of fifteen students.

The Church of St. Ignatius Loyola is in the same complex and is used for various school functions. The church is listed as a New York City landmark and the complex is listed as a National Historic Place. The Saint Ignatius Loyola School is a grammar school that also shares the complex, but there is no official link between the schools.

== History ==
The Rev. Robert J. Fulton, (1826–1895), eleventh pastor (from 1880) of St. Lawrence O'Toole (the original parish name of the Church of St. Ignatius Loyola), purchased the northwest corner of Park Avenue and 83rd Street (in the Yorkville neighborhood) adjacent to his church. The purchase price was $7,500.

Upon the church's rebuilding and re-dedication, the Society of Jesus strengthened their ties to this parish by founding the school, which was encouraged by the Dominicans at St. Vincent Ferrer and the Paulist Fathers at St. Paul the Apostle. Ground was broken for the new school in February 1899.

The school opened to students in October 1900 with classes held in the nearby priests' residence.

After various building material strikes delayed completion, the six-story Renaissance Revival style steel-framed school opened on December 17, 1900, and was formally dedicated by Michael A. Corrigan, Archbishop of New York, on February 11, 1901.

The New York Herald reviewed the new "Early Renaissance Type" building, reporting that "the building cost about $125,000; and the property, taken with the lot on which it is located, represents an expenditure of over $200,000. The exterior of the building is constructed entirely of Ohio sandstone, with cornices, and a flambeau with coat of arms just over the entrance.... It is of the most advanced fireproof construction.... Altogether the building represents the highest degree of architectural excellence as applied to schools."

The Latin inscription on the first floor chapel bow's blind window panel (with segmental pediment) of the Park Avenue facade reads "SANCT IGNATIO / DE LOYOLA / PATRI LEGIFERO / SOCIETATIS JESV / QVI VBICVMQVE / GENTIVM / IN SPEM RELIGIONIS / ET CIVITATIS / ADOLESCENTES MORIBUS / ET BONIS ARTIBVS / IMBVIT / AEDES HAE / DEDICANTVR" which translates: "To Saint Ignatius Loyola / Founder of the Society of Jesus / who for the good of Church and State / everywhere / has stored the minds of youth / with virtue and learning / these buildings are dedicated." This inscription was written by Father Philip Cardella.

The chapel was decorated by Brother Francis C. Schroen, S.J. (1857–1924), who had previously been a designer at the Jesuit Georgetown University. The stained glass was by Louis C. Tiffany and above Schroen's white marble altar was a canopied statue of Our Lady of Lourdes by the New York-sculptor Joseph Sibbel.

The six-story gymnasium and rectory at 43–63 East 83rd Street was built in 1953 to designs by architects Eggers & Higgins at a reported cost of $800,000. The five-story extension at 39–41 East 83rd Street was completed by the same architects in 1954 at a reported cost of $290,000.

In September 2024, the school opened a major 10,000-square-foot expansion designed by Ernest Harris Architects that added significant student-centered spaces to its Upper East Side campus. The renovation project doubled the size of the student commons, creating an open-concept dining and social area for up to 150 students featuring expanded natural light. A key component of the expansion is the new STEM center on the fourth floor, which is equipped with high-end technology and a designated robotics field to support courses in engineering, advanced programming, and computer-aided design. Additional improvements include a new faculty collaboration room, a library extension, and modern administrative offices for campus ministry and counseling services.

== Notable alumni ==
- Michael Joseph Armstrong – vice president, Cantor Fitzgerald; died on September 11, 2001
- Kevin Raymond Crotty – managing director, Sandler O'Neill and Partners; died on September 11, 2001
- Thomas Cullen – New York City Fire Department firefighter; died on September 11, 2001
- Drea de Matteo – actress
- Jim Dwyer – Pulitzer Prize-winning journalist
- Neal Finn – second baseman, Brooklyn Dodgers and Philadelphia Phillies
- Wellington Mara – former owner, New York Giants NFL team
- Joseph Patrick Shea – partner and senior executive managing director, Cantor Fitzgerald; died on September 11, 2001
- Horace Stoneham – former owner, New York/San Francisco Giants MLB team
- Dan Topping Jr. – former general manager and vice president, New York Yankees
- Robert F. Wagner Jr. – Mayor of New York City; United States Ambassador to Spain

== School Administration ==
Headmasters and Principals

- William J. Ennis, S.J. (1900–1903)
- James P. Fagan, S.J. (1903–1906)
- Patrick F. O'Gorman, S.J. (1906–1920)
- J.H. Farley, S.J. (1920–1932)
- Frances E. Garner, S.J. (1932–1939)
- Walter A. Reilly, S.J. (1939–1946)
- C. Justin Hanley, S.J. (1946–1949)
- Peter J. Daly, S.J. (1949–1960)
- Robert J. Haskins, S.J. (1960–1968)
- Michael J. Guerra (1968–1982)
- James F. Fox, S.J. (1982–1995)
- Joseph J. Papaj, S.J. (1995–2001)
- Franklin N. Caesar (2001–2004)
- James F.X. Lyness (2004–2014)
- Kristin Ross (2014–2017)

Following Dr. Ross's appointment, the title of "headmaster" was retired and replaced with that of "principal" .

- Adam Lewis (2017–2019)
- James F.X. Lyness (2019–2024)
- James DeAngelo (since 2024)

Presidents

- Neil Norbert McKinnon, S.J (1900–1907)
- William O'Brien Pardow, S.J. (1907–1909)
- David W. Hearn, S.J. (1909–1915)
- J. Havens Richards, S.J. (1915–1919)
- James J. Kilrowy, S.J. (1919–1924)
- Patrick F. O'Gorman, S.J. (1924–1930)
- Edward J. Sweeney, S.J. (1930–1933)
- William J. Devlin, S.J. (1933–1935)
- W. Coleman Nevils, S.J. (1935–1940)
- Francis A. McQuade, S.J. (1940–1945)
- John Edwards Gratton, S.J. (1945–1949)
- C. Justin Hanley, S.J. (1949–1952)
- Robert I. Gannon, S.J. (1952–1958)
- John J. McGinty, S.J. (1958–1960)
- William T. Wood, S.J. (1960–1966)
- Charles T. Taylor, S.J. (1966–1970)
- Robert Haskins, S.J. (1970–1975)
- John Kelly, S.J. (1975–1981)
- James F. Fox, S.J. (1981–1995)
- Joseph J. Papaj, S.J. (1995–2002)
- Stephen Katsouros, S.J. (2002–2011)
- Tony Oroszlany (since 2011)
