= Saint Ignatius Loyola School (New York City) =

Location
- 48 East 84th Street; New York, New York 10028; United States; 40°46′45″N 73°57′33″W

Information
- Type: Private, co-educational, independent grammar school
- Religious affiliation: Roman Catholic (Jesuit-inspired)
- Established: 1854
- Grades: PreK-3–8
- Gender: Co-educational
- Enrollment: 535 (2024–2025)
- Colors: Blue and gold
- Mascot: Lions
- Website: saintignatiusloyolaschool.com

Saint Ignatius Loyola School is a private, co-educational grammar school on Manhattan's Upper East Side. It serves students from PreK-3 through Grade 8 and is affiliated with the Archdiocese of New York.

== History ==
The school was founded in 1854 as a parochial school to serve Irish families in the Yorkville neighborhood. The parish was transferred to the Society of Jesus in 1866, who introduced a Jesuit-inspired educational approach. The Upper Campus building at 48 East 84th Street has housed the school since 1906. The school holds the distinction of being the oldest Jesuit grammar school in New York.

== Campus ==
The school operates two campuses on East 84th Street. The upper campus for grades 1–8 is located at 48 East 84th Street. The historic building (constructed in 1900 with later additions, including renovations in 2005) houses classrooms, science labs, art studios, and a gymnasium. The building totals approximately 100,000 square feet.

The lower campus (PreK-3 to Kindergarten) is located at 240 East 84th Street. It was designed specifically for early childhood education. Constructed in 1915 in a Neo-Gothic style as a "Day Nursery," it was financed and donated by Nicholas Frederic Brady, a leading philanthropist and one of the wealthiest men in New York at the time. The building totals approximately 16,000 square feet.

The school forms part of the historic parish complex which is anchored by the landmark Church of St. Ignatius Loyola. The church was completed in 1898, the parish complex was designated a New York City Landmark in 1969 and was added to the National Register of Historic Places in 1980.

The interiors have served as a filming location for several television series, including the CW series Gossip Girl (Season 1, Episode 8) and HBO series Succession (Season 4, Episode 9).

== Academics ==
The school educates approximately 500 children, with 50 students per grade. 99% of faculty hold advanced degrees. The curriculum emphasizes critical thinking, STEM (including coding classes, a working greenhouse used by all grades, and widespread technology integration), the arts, and character development rooted in Jesuit values of diligence, integrity, compassion, and social justice.

The school is financially self-sustaining and is additionally supported by a $50 million endowment, among the largest for a New York City elementary/middle school. It has received the National Blue Ribbon School of Excellence award three times (2011, 2018, and 2024).

== Student life ==
The school offers interscholastic sports (basketball, soccer, track) and a wide range of after-school clubs, including acting, animal habitats, art appreciation, arts and crafts, coding, cheer club, chess, creative writing, dance, drama, game club, sports club, screenwriting, sculpture making, yoga, and many others. Community events include science fairs, concerts, and annual traditions such as the St. Blaise feast day blessing of the throats. The close-knit community draws families primarily from Manhattan's Upper East Side.
