= Schickel & Ditmars =

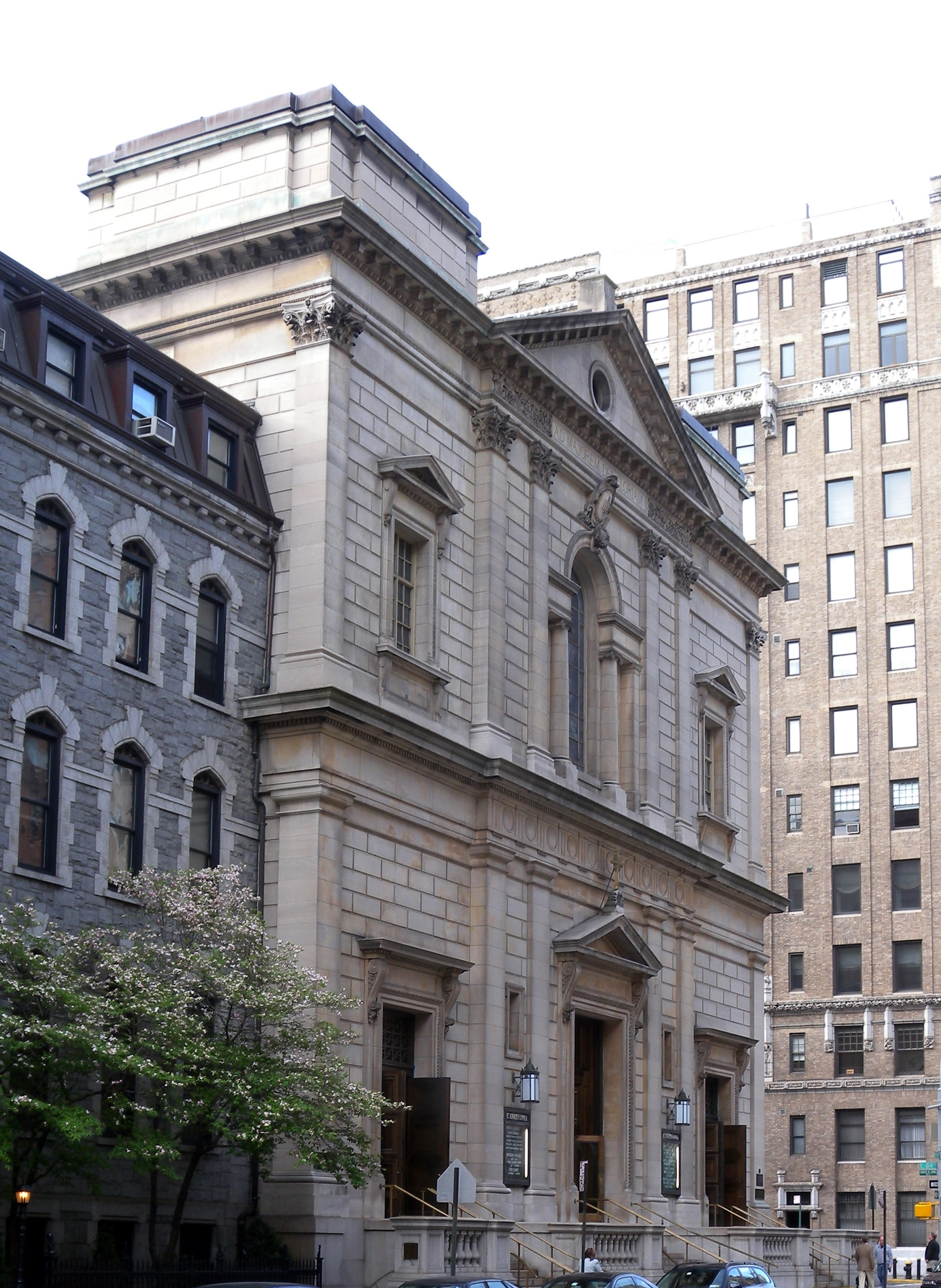
Church of St. Ignatius Loyola (New York City), 1898

Schickel & Ditmars was an architectural firm in New York City, active during the city's Gilded Age from 1885 until the early 1900s. It was responsible for designing many fine churches, residences and commercial buildings.

== History ==
J. William Schickel (1850–1907) formed the firm in 1885 as William Schickel & Company, in association with Isaac E. Ditmars (1850–1934) and Hugo Kafka (1843–1913). The firm's name changed to Schickel and Ditmars in 1895, and continued under the direction of Ditmars after Schickel's death in 1907. The firm "enjoyed considerable patronage from German-American clients" and produced a large number of works for the Roman Catholic Archdiocese of New York. The firm "focused primarily, although not exclusively, on preparing designs for Roman Catholic churches and institutional buildings," particularly Roman Catholic churches for German-American parishes. The firm's address was listed at 111 Fifth Avenue, New York City.

Schickel & Ditmars were the architects responsible for much of Lenox Hill Hospital (under its previous name, "The German Hospital") as it grew into its present location on the Upper East Side.

The prominent architect and artist Harold Van Buren Magonigle was counted amongst the firm's employees.

== Noteworthy structures ==
Churches and Ecclesiastical Projects:

- St. Andrew-on-Hudson (now the Culinary Institute of America's Roth Hall), Hyde Park, New York (1899-1902)
- St. Anthony of Padua Church, 154 Sullivan Street, New York City, New York (1886-1888)
- St. Boniface Roman Catholic Church and rectory, Rochester, New York (1887, demolished due to fire, rectory extant)
- St. Liborius Roman Catholic Church, St. Louis, Missouri (1889)
- St. Louis Roman Catholic Church, Buffalo, New York, 780-790 Main Street, Buffalo, New York, (1889)
- St. Patrick's Church, Elizabeth, New Jersey, (1889)
- St. Vincent Archabbey, Latrobe, Pennsylvania, (1891-1905)
- Church of the Immaculate Conception, Montclair, New Jersey, (1892-1908)
- St. Joseph's Roman Catholic Church, 408 East 87th Street, Yorkville, New York City (1895)
- St. Joseph's Seminary, Dunwoodie (1896), 201 Seminary Avenue, Yonkers, New York
- Church of the Most Precious Blood (Manhattan), 109 Mulberry St, New York City, New York (1897)
- The Church of the Ascension (RC) (1896–1897), 221 West 107th Street, Upper West Side, Manhattan, New York City
- St. Ignatius of Loyola, (1898)
- Evangelical Lutheran Church of the Holy Trinity (1902), Central Park West, NW corner of 65th Street, a church with rectory built for $125,000.

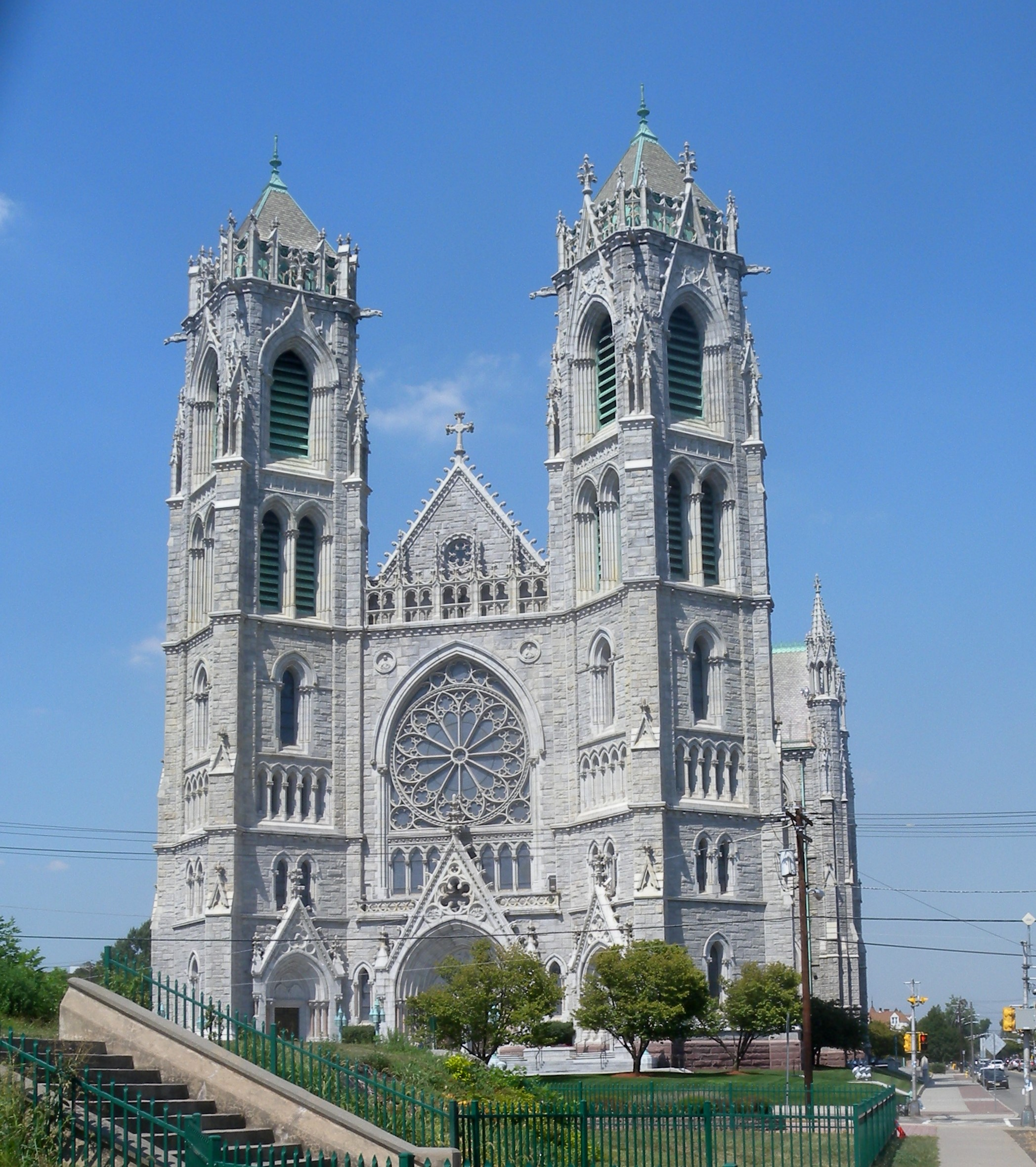
Sacred Heart, Newark, one of the largest gothic cathedrals in the U.S.

- St. Monica's Roman Catholic Church, New York City, (1906)

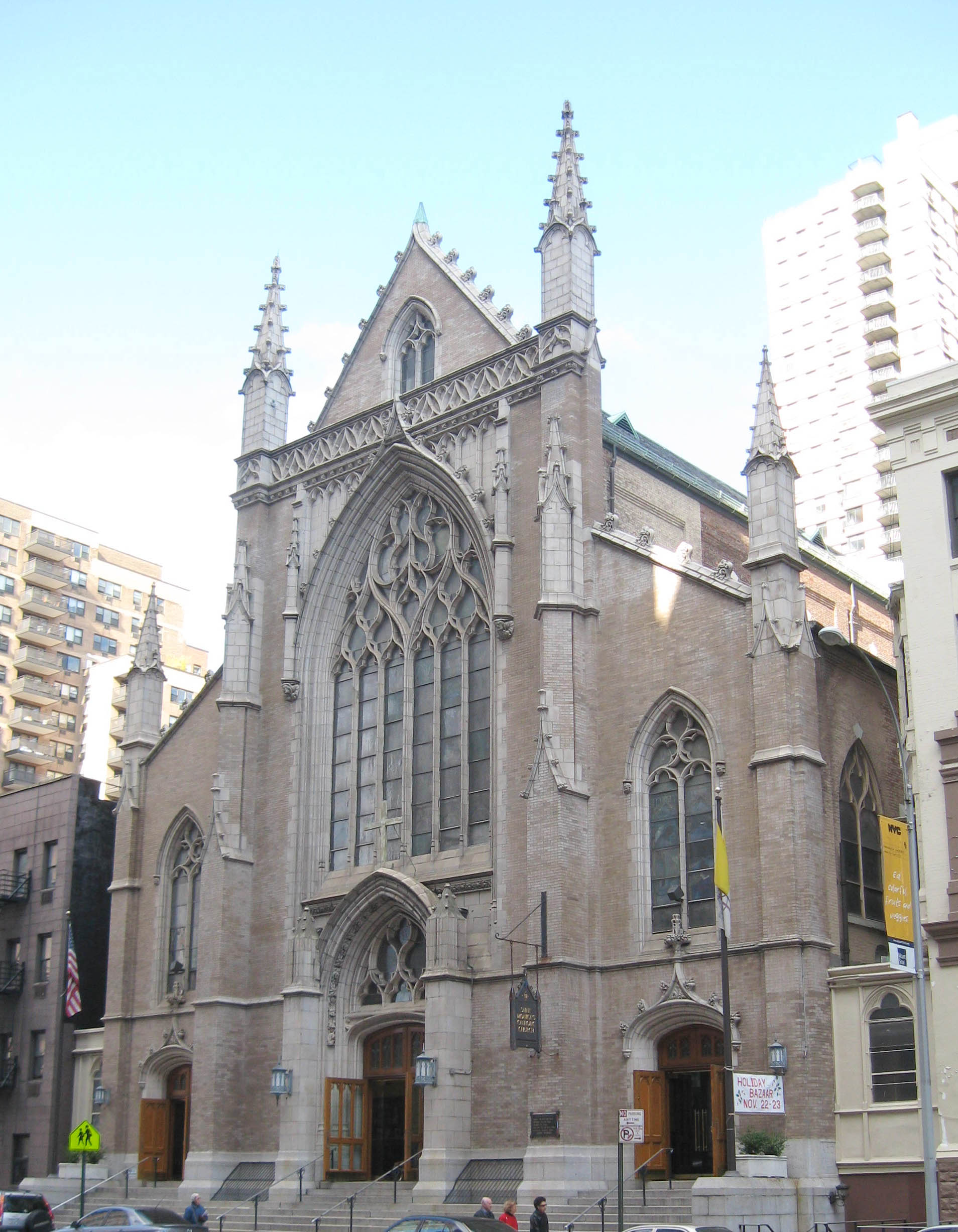
The Church of St. Monica (Manhattan), photographed in 2008

- George Ehret Mausoleum, Woodlawn Cemetery, Bronx, New York City, New York,(1900)
- Basilica of the Sacred Heart of Jesus in Newark, New Jersey, "following the dismissal of its original architect Jeremiah O'Rourke in 1910."

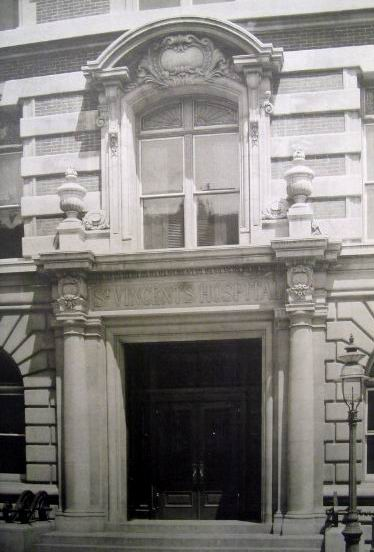
Main Entrance of St. Vincent's Hospital (1900), Greenwich Village, New York City

Hospitals and Institutions:

- St. Peter's Hospital, 274 Henry Street, Brooklyn, (1888-9)
- The Catholic Club of New York, 120 Central Park South, New York City, New York (1892, demolished mid-20th century)
- The German Hospital, New York City, New York (1900, demolished), SW corner of 77th Street and Lexington Avenue, a five-story and basement brick hospital, built for the German Hospital for $120,000.
- 523-531 E 86th Street, (1907), a 5-6-story brick stone dwelling with chapel, built for $125,000 for the Sisters of Misericorde.
- St. Ignatius' School, 46-50 E 84th Street, (1907), built for the Church of St. Ignatius for $150,000.
- St. Lawrence Hospital, 430-432 West 164th Street, New York City, New York, (1912–13)
- The German Hospital Nursing School, 1084-1090 Lexington Avenue, New York City, New York (1916), a nine-story brick nursing school, built for the German Hospital two years before it would be renamed to Lenox Hill.
- The St. Vincent de Paul Hospital School of Nursing, 1-17 Seventh Avenue and 148-172 West 12th Street, New York City, New York (1924, Seventh Avenue structures demolished for 1951 Al Smith building)

Commercial, Office and Industrial Buildings:

- The Constable Building Annex, 12 East 18th Street, New York City, New York (1886-7)
- Astor Building (now The Mercer Hotel), 99 Prince Street, New York City, New York, (1887-8)
- Ehrich Brothers Emporium, 695-709 Sixth Avenue, New York City, New York (1889)
- R.H. Macy & Co. Store Annex, 55 13th Street, New York City, New York (1891-1892), now Arnhold Hall of The New School
- Scott & Bowne Building, 409-415 Pearl Street, New York City, New York, (1892 or 1893), demolished
- The Constable Building Office Tower, 109-111th Fifth Avenue, New York City, New York (1894-5)
- R.H. Macy & Co. Store Annex, 56 West 14th Street, New York City, New York (1897), New York City Landmark
- The Conley Foil Company Building, 521-537 West 25th Street, New York City, New York (1900), a four-story and basement brick factory, built for Conley Foil Co. for $165,000.
- The Lakewood Hotel, Lakewood, New Jersey, (1901) demolished, built for Nathan Straus
- The Johnston Building, 1166-1172 (1170) Broadway, New York City, New York (1902-3), a 12-story stone front office building with stores, built for Caroline H Johnston, Stuttgart, Germany, attorney, and Frederick A Constable of 9 E 83rd St for $500,000.
- 38 West 21st Street, New York City, New York (1908)

Residences:

- Constable Family Stables & Greenhouse Complex, 4 East 84th Street, et al, New York City, New York, (1886), demolished c. 1950 for 1025 Fifth Avenue
- Leonard and Annie Weiderer House, 387 St. Paul's Avenue, Staten Island, New York, (1886–1888)
- Residence of John D. Crimmins, Esq., 40-42 East 68th Street, New York City, New York, (1898) addition, renovation and new facade
- Mrs. Thomas Fortune Ryan Residence, 1 West 12th Street, (1901), demolished
- William Baumgartner Residence, 294 Riverside Drive, New York City, New York (1901)
- Isaac Stern House, 858 5th Ave., New York City, New York (1894 or 1900), demolished
- Louis Stern Residence, 993 5th Ave., New York City, New York (1887 or 1900), demolished
- Isaac Stern Residence, 42 East 52nd Street, New York City, New York (1904), demolished

== Noteworthy alumni ==
- Harold Van Buren Magonigle
- George H. Streeton
