= Church of St. Ignatius Loyola (New York City) =

Catholic church in Manhattan, New York

- U.S. National Register of Historic Places
- U.S. Historic district – Contributing property
- New York State Register of Historic Places
- New York City Landmark
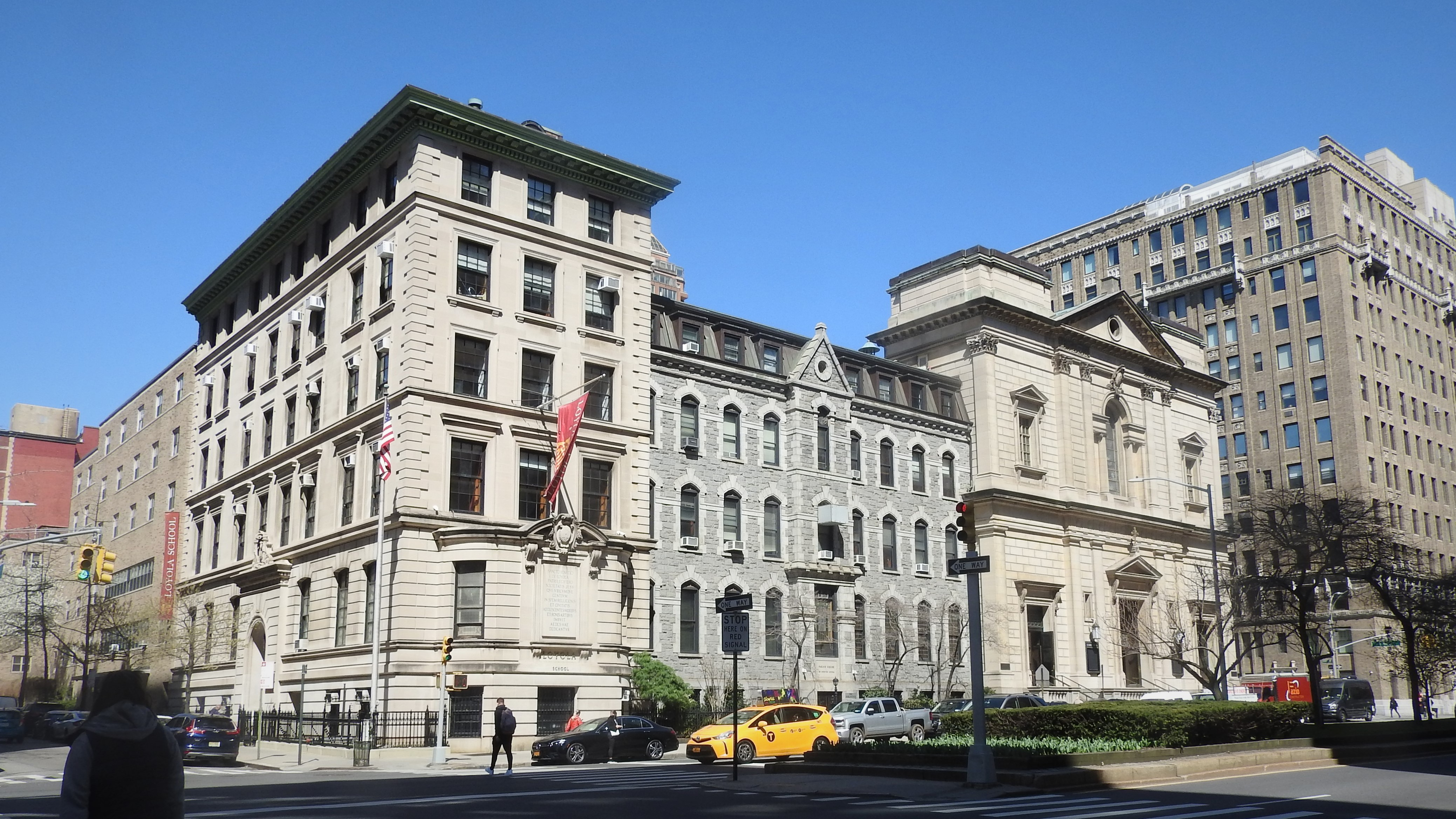
- St. Ignatius Loyola complex, April 2021

- Location within Manhattan Location within New York City Location within New York Location within the United States
- Location: 980 Park Avenue, New York City, New York
- Coordinates: 40°46′44″N 73°57′31″W
- Area: 3.5 acres (1.4 ha)
- Built: 1895-1900
- Architect: Schickel & Ditmars
- Architectural style: German Baroque; Classical Revival
- Website: Official website
- Part of: Park Avenue Historic District (ID10000588)
- NRHP reference No.: 80002679
- NYSRHP No.: 06101.002473
- NYCL No.: 0431

Significant dates
- Added to NRHP: July 24, 1980
- Designated NYSRHP: June 23, 1980
- Designated NYCL: March 4, 1969

The Church of St. Ignatius Loyola (also referred to as the Church of St. Ignatius of Loyola) is a Roman Catholic parish church on the Upper East Side of Manhattan in New York City. Administered by the Society of Jesus, the parish falls under the authority of the Roman Catholic Archdiocese of New York. It was established in 1851 as St. Lawrence O'Toole's Church. In 1898, Rome granted permission to change the patron saint to St. Ignatius of Loyola, the founder of the Jesuit order.

The church is located at 980 Park Avenue, on the southwest corner of Park Avenue and East 84th Street. It forms the centerpiece of a large Jesuit complex occupying most of the block bounded by Park Avenue, East 83rd Street, Madison Avenue, and East 84th Street. The complex includes Wallace Hall (the parish hall beneath the church), the rectory on Park Avenue, and the Saint Ignatius Loyola School (the parish grammar school) directly behind the church. The complex is also home to two Jesuit high schools: Loyola School (a coeducational college-preparatory school) and Regis High School (an all-scholarship, merit-based, boys' college-preparatory school).

The church was designated a New York City Landmark on March 4, 1969, and was added to the National Register of Historic Places on July 24, 1980.

== History ==
The parish was established in 1851. It occupies "the site of the former St. Lawrence O'Toole Church, founded in 1851, and named for a twelfth-century bishop of Dublin by the parish's first pastor, the Rev. Eugene O'Reilly from Ireland. A wooden church was erected in 1852, which was replaced in 1853 by a modest brick structure through the hard work and fund raising by the Rev.Walter Quarter.

The parish was entrusted to the care of the Society of Jesus in 1886 and marked the Jesuits' first major apostolate in the Yorkville area of New York. Late-nineteenth-century directories listed the address of St. Lawrence at the corner of Park Avenue and East 84th Street. The church's present foundation was built 1884-1886 as the foundations to a planned Gothic design. The parish was transferred to Jesuit control in 1886. The present church was built 1895 to 1900 to the designs of architect J. William Schickel of Schickel & Ditmars, and dedicated on December 11, 1898, by the Most Reverend Michael Corrigan, third Archbishop of New York. The present building was erected among the increasing affluence and confidence of the Catholic community on the Upper East Side near the start of the 20th century as well as the ambitious determination of Fr. Neil McKinnon, S.J., pastor of the parish from 1893 to 1907. During his time, Martin J. Scott, later a noted author of novels and controversial literature, worked as assistant priest among the young (1902-1915) and built a day nursery in 1910.

The church was declared a New York City Landmark on March 4, 1969. The church was added to the National Register of Historic Places on July 24, 1980.

The complex has been used as a filming location for the Woody Allen film Interiors, as well as television series, including the confessional scene in Gossip Girl (Season 1, Episode 8) and the elaborate funeral of Logan Roy in Succession (Season 4, Episode 9, filmed on-site in 2023).

== Controversy ==
The church has attracted some controversy for its stance on homosexuality. Although no Catholic church or priest can perform a same-sex marriage, the parish has an "LGBT Catholics & Friends" ministry that describes LGBT people as "fully affirmed and celebrated". The parish has publicly criticized the Catholic church: in April 2021, the parish's official website published an essay by a co-chair of the ministry criticizing the Vatican's refusal to bless same-sex unions. The essay reproduced ministry members' statements that they wanted "a full marriage" for same-sex couples, did not care "what the hierarchy in Rome says", and hoped to change the wider Catholic Church. This advocacy of same-sex marriage is contrary to the Catholic Church's stated teaching that marriage is the exclusive union of a man and a woman and that sexual relations are morally licit only within such a marriage.

Beyond marriage, as of 2026 the church has not yet publicly disputed or contradicted the other 6 sacraments (baptism, confirmation, communion, confession, ordination, or last rites).

== Educational presence ==
The Church of St. Ignatius Loyola anchors a broader educational presence on the Upper East Side block. The parish directly operates or is closely affiliated with several schools as part of its ministry.

The primary parish school is the Saint Ignatius Loyola School (48 East 84th Street), a co-educational grammar school (PreK-3 through grade 8) located immediately behind the church on the north side of the street. Founded in 1854 as a parochial school serving Irish families in Yorkville, it adopted a Jesuit-inspired approach after the Jesuits assumed parish administration in 1866. The school is highly selective, with a low single digit acceptance rate (excluding legacy and affiliated applicants), and has been recognized as a National Blue Ribbon School three times (2011, 2018, and 2024) for academic excellence.

Adjacent institutions include:

Loyola School (980 Park Avenue), a Jesuit coeducational college-preparatory high school located at the northwest corner of Park Avenue and East 83rd Street.

Regis High School (55 East 84th Street), a highly competitive, all-scholarship Jesuit boys' high school located on the north side of East 84th Street, known for its merit-based admissions and rigorous academic standards.

These schools form part of the historic Jesuit complex documented in the church's New York City Landmark designation and National Register of Historic Places listing.

== Notable events and associations ==
The Church of St. Ignatius Loyola has long been a preferred location for high-profile funerals in New York City and has counted several prominent figures among its parishioners and visitors.

=== Notable parishioners ===
- President John F. Kennedy and First Lady Jacqueline Kennedy
- Grace Kelly (later Princess Grace of Monaco) and Prince Rainier
- Lena Horne, singer, actress, and civil rights activist
- James A. Farley, U.S. Postmaster General and Democratic Party chairman

=== Notable funerals ===
- Jacqueline Kennedy Onassis, former First Lady – May 23, 1994 (she had been baptized and confirmed in the church)
- Aaliyah, singer and actress – August 31, 2001
- Patricia Kennedy Lawford – September 2006
- Lena Horne, singer, actress, and civil rights activist – May 14, 2010 (she was a regular communicant at the parish)
- Philip Seymour Hoffman, actor – February 7, 2014
- Oscar de la Renta, fashion designer – November 3, 2014
- Mario Cuomo, Governor of New York – January 6, 2015
- Ann Mara, co-owner of the New York Giants – February 2015
- David Carr, New York Times columnist – February 2015
- Tatiana Schlossberg, journalist and granddaughter of Jacqueline Kennedy Onassis – January 5, 2026

== Architecture ==
Ignatius Loyola complex on Park Avenue (2026)

=== Exterior ===
St. Ignatius Loyola, A Pictorial History and Walking Guide of New York City's Church of St. Ignatius Loyola (1999) includes an exemplary description of the exterior and interior of the church:

Two unbroken vertical orders, a Palladian arched window, and a tri-part horizontal division suggesting the central nave and side aisles beyond, lend a Classical balance to the Park Avenue exterior. Yet St. Ignatius' façade is not static; the central division raised in slight relief beyond the side divisions and the varying intervals between the symmetrically positioned pilasters (columns that are not free standing) create a subtly undulating dynamism that introduces a note of syncopated rhythm reminiscent of the exterior of Il Gesù, the Jesuits' mother church in Rome. The original plans for the street front of St. Ignatius, presently 90 feet high and 87 feel wide, included a pair of towers designed to reach 210 feet above the ground, but this feature of the project was abandoned early, leaving only the two copper-capped tower bases on either side of the central pediment as hints of the grander scheme. Located directly beneath this pediment are the motto of the Society of Jesus, Ad Majorem Dei Gloriam (To the Greater Glory of God) and the Great Seal of the Society, composed of a cross, three nails, and the letters I H S (the first three letters of Jesus' name in Greek which later became a Latin acronym denoting Jesus the Savior of Humankind); together they proclaim to all who pass by that St. Ignatius is a Jesuit Parish.

=== Interior ===
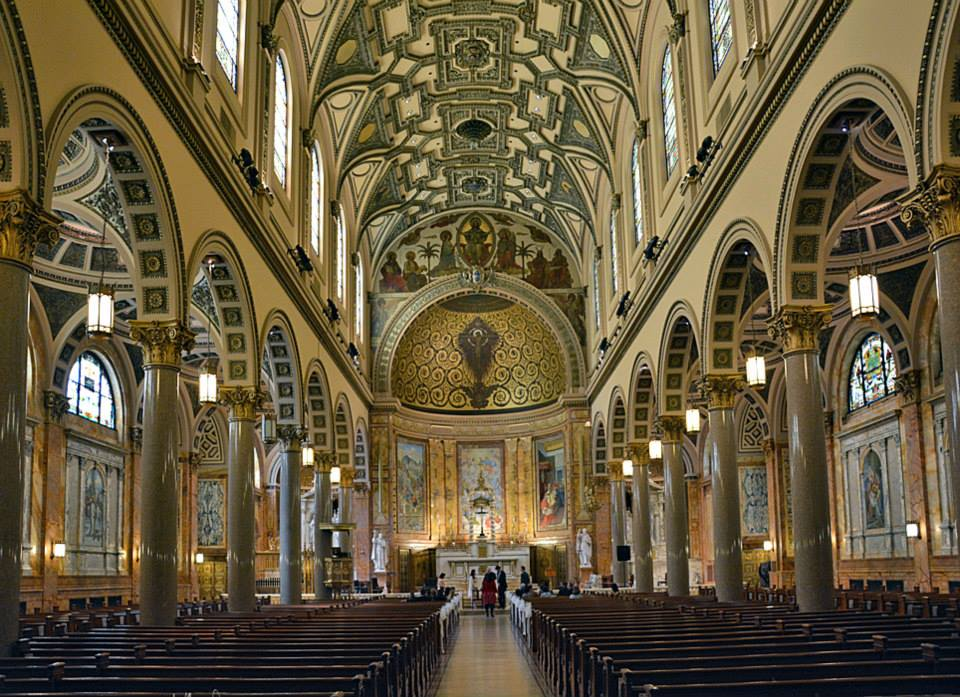
Interior

The church is constructed of American, European, and African marbles, including pink Tennessee, red-veined Numidian, yellow Siena, pink Algerian marble, white Carrara marble, and veined Pavonazzo marble; most of the intricate marble work was executed by the firm of James G. Batterson Jr., and John Eisele of New York.

The marble mosaic Stations of the Cross panels were designed by Professor Paoletti for Salviati & Company of Venice; some were publicly exhibited in Turin before installation.

The great twelve-panel bronze doors located at the sanctuary end of the side aisles… were designed by the Rev. Patrick O'Gorman, S.J., pastor from 1924 to 1929... [and were] crafted by the Long Island Bronze Company….

The Jesuit statues, including St. Francis Xavier and St. John Francis Regis were carved by the Joseph Sibbel Studio of New York in Carrara marble.

The church is notable for its organ, dedicated in 1993 and built by English organ builder Noel Mander. The instrument "is New York City's largest mechanical action (tracker) pipe organ, and the largest mechanical action pipe organ ever to have been built in the British Isles."

=== Baptistery ===
The semi-circular wrought-iron baptistery screen in the Chapel of John the Baptist of gilt flaming swords was wrought by Mr. John Williams to the designs of William Schickel. The baptistery font is of Carrara marble set above marble pavement designed "by Heaton, Butler & Bayne of London, with slight modifications made by Mr. John Buck of the Ecclesiastical Department of the Gorham Company of New York; the Gorham Company was also responsible for cutting and installing the mosaic's tesserae (the pieces comprising the mosaic)." The baptistery's altar and surround curved walls are of Pavonazzo marble inlaid with mosaics, "designed and executed under the direction of Mr. Caryl Coleman of the Ecclesiastical Department of the Tiffany Glass and Decorating Company. These mosaics, composed of that company's justly famous opalescent Favrile glass, are as delicate as the Venetian glass mosaics above are bold." Tiffany also executed the baptistery's semi-dome.

== List of rectors ==
- 1. Rev. Eugene O'Reilly, rector 1851-August 5, 1852
- 2. Rev. Thomas Ouellet, S.J., rector 1852-
- 3. Rev. Walter J. Quarter, rector, Oct.1852 –1863
- 4. Rev. Samuel Mulledy (1811–1866), rector 1863–1866
- 5. Rev. Victor Beaudevin, S.J., rector 1866–
- 10. Rev. John Treanor, S.J., rector (–1880)
- 11. Rev. Robert J. Fulton, S.J.(1826-1895), rector November 1, 1880-
- 12. Rev. David Merrick, S.J. (rector 1880–)
- 13. Rev. Neil McKinnon, S.J., rector July 31, 1893 – 1907 (parish rededicated on December 11, 1898, with new upper church dedicated to St. Ignatius Loyola and lower church dedicated to St. Lawrence O'Toole)
- 14. William O'Brien Pardow, S.J., rector 1907-1909
- 15. David Hearn, S.J., rector 1909-1915
- 16. Cowles Havens Richards, S.J., rector 1915-1919
- 17. James J. Kilrowy, S.J., rector 1919-1924
- 18. Patrick F. O'Gorman, S.J., rector 1924-1929
- 19. Edward J. Sweeney, S.J., rector 1930-1933
- 20. William J. Devlin, S.J., rector 1933-1935
- 21. W. Coleman Nevils, S.J., rector 1935-1940
- 22. Francis A. McQuade, S.J., rector 1940-1945
- 23. John Edwards Gratton, S.J., rector 1945-1949
- 24. C. Justin Hanley, S.J., rector 1949-1952
- 25. Robert I. Gannon, S.J., rector 1952-1958
- 26. John J. McGinty, S.J., rector 1958-1960
- 27. William T. Wood, S.J., rector 1960-1966
- 28. Charles T. Taylor, S.J., rector 1966-1970
- 29. Robert J. Haskins, S.J., rector 1970-1979
- 30. Victor R. Yanitelli, S.J., rector 1980-1986
- 31. Walter F. Modrys, S.J., rector 1986-2005
- 32. Gerald R. Blaszczak, S.J., rector 2005-2008
- 33. William J. Bergen, S.J., acting rector June–August 2008
- 34. George M. Witt, S.J., rector 2008-2015
- 35. Thomas H. Feely, S.J., parish administrator 2015–2016
- 36. Dennis J. Yesalonia, S.J., rector 2016–Present

== See also ==
- National Register of Historic Places listings in Manhattan below 14th Street
- List of Jesuit sites
- List of New York City Designated Landmarks in Manhattan below 14th Street
