= Isaac E. Ditmars =

Canadian-American architect

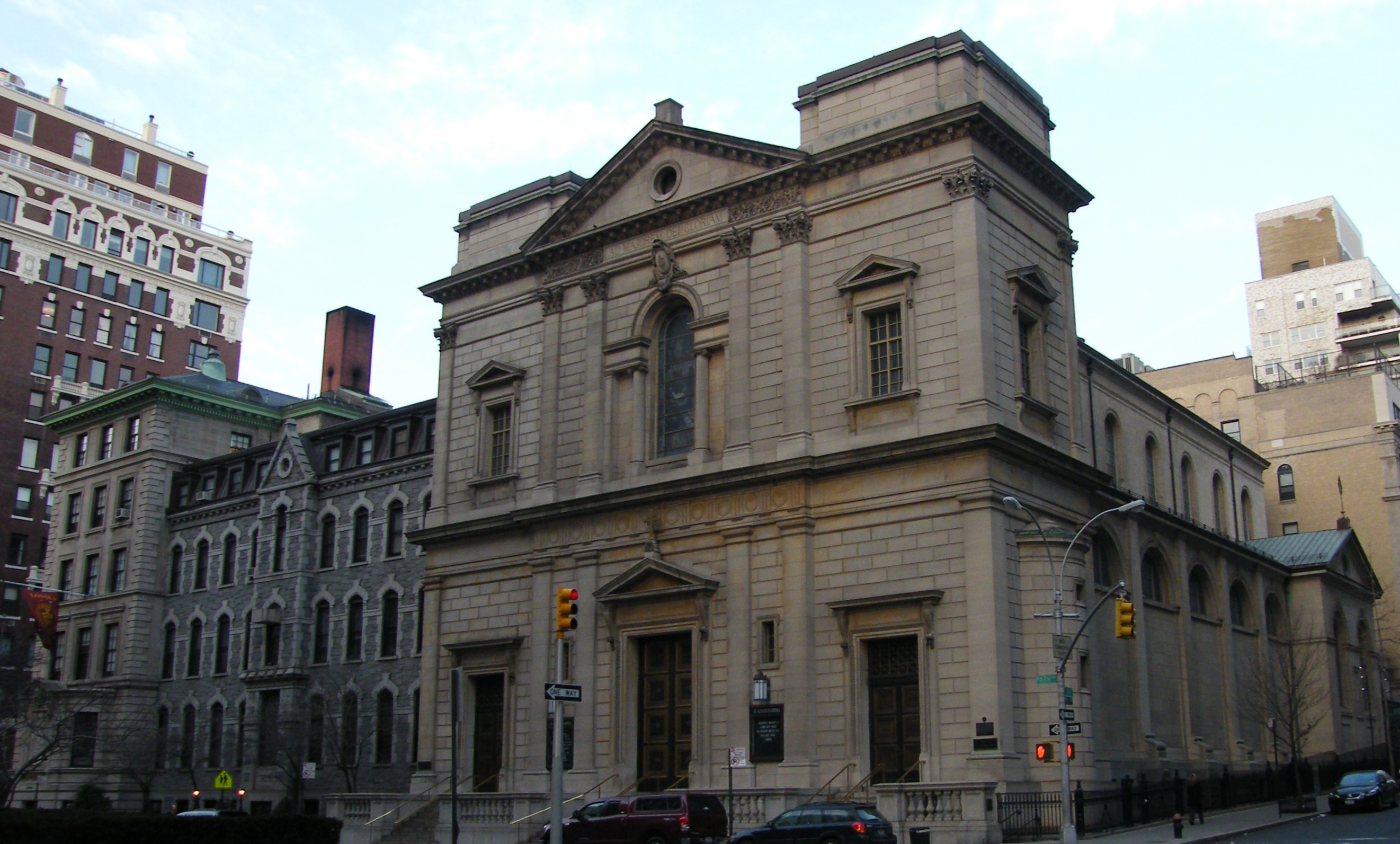
- Church of St. Ignatius Loyola, 980 Park Avenue, New York, New York
- Born: 1850
- Died: 1935 (aged 84–85)
- Known for: Architect

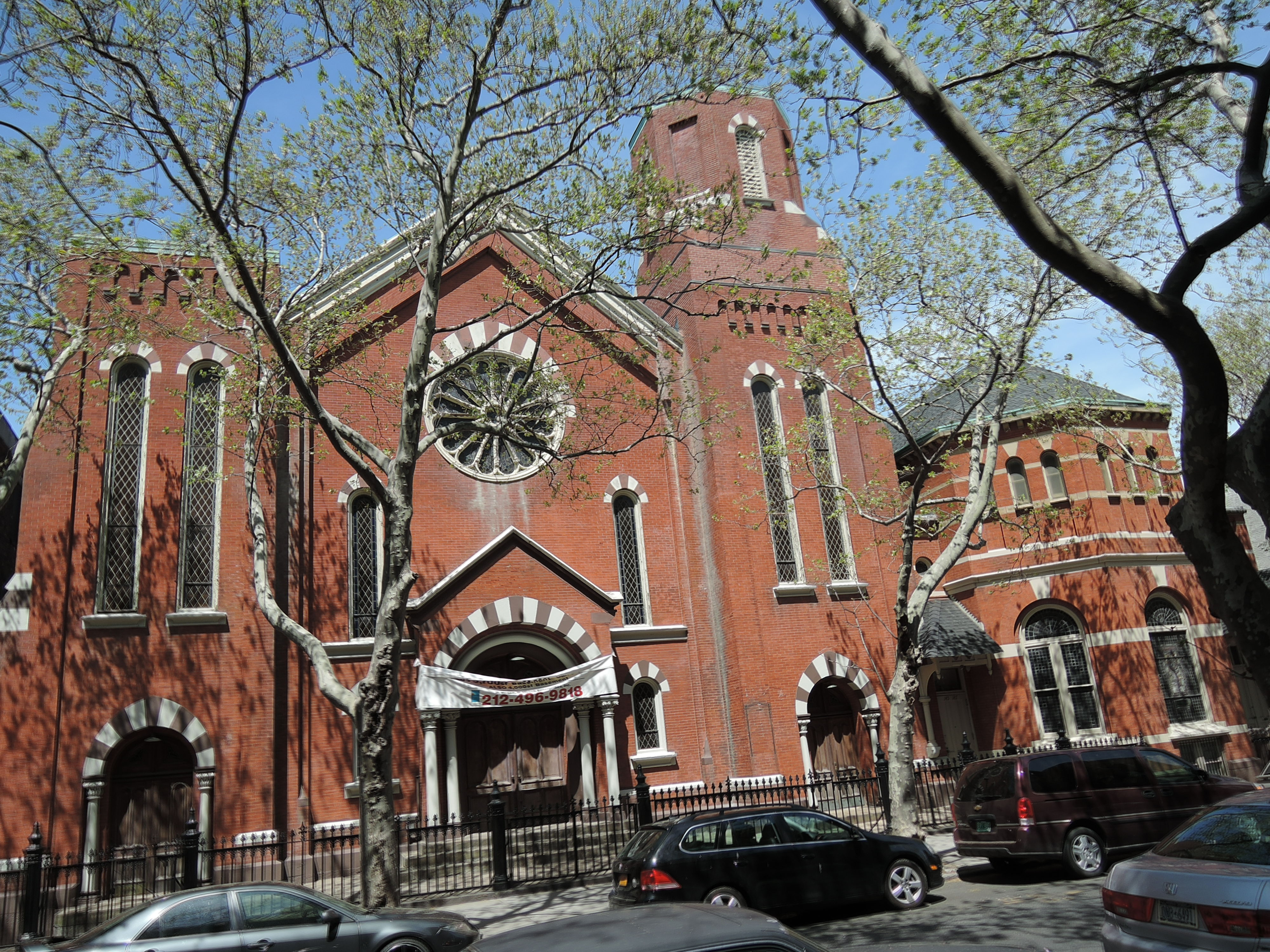
St Elias Greek Rite Catholic Church, Greenpoint

Isaac E. Ditmars, FAIA, was a Canadian-American architect and founding associate of William Schickel & Company, and directed that company as Schickel & Ditmars from 1907 into the 1920s. He joined the American Institute of Architects in 1895 and became a fellow that year.

He died in 1935.

In 1913, he designed a six-story brick hospital at 430-432 West 164th Street for the Sisters of Charity of St. Vincent De Paul and Mt. St. Vincent on Hudson for $500,000.

There was an architect named William B. Ditmars, architect of the Reformed Church of Greenpoint, now the St. Elias Greek Rite Roman Catholic Church (Brooklyn, New York) (1869–1870), who may be related.
