= United States Customhouse and Post Office (St. Louis, Missouri) =

- United States Custom House and Post Office
- U.S. National Register of Historic Places
- U.S. National Historic Landmark
- St. Louis Landmark
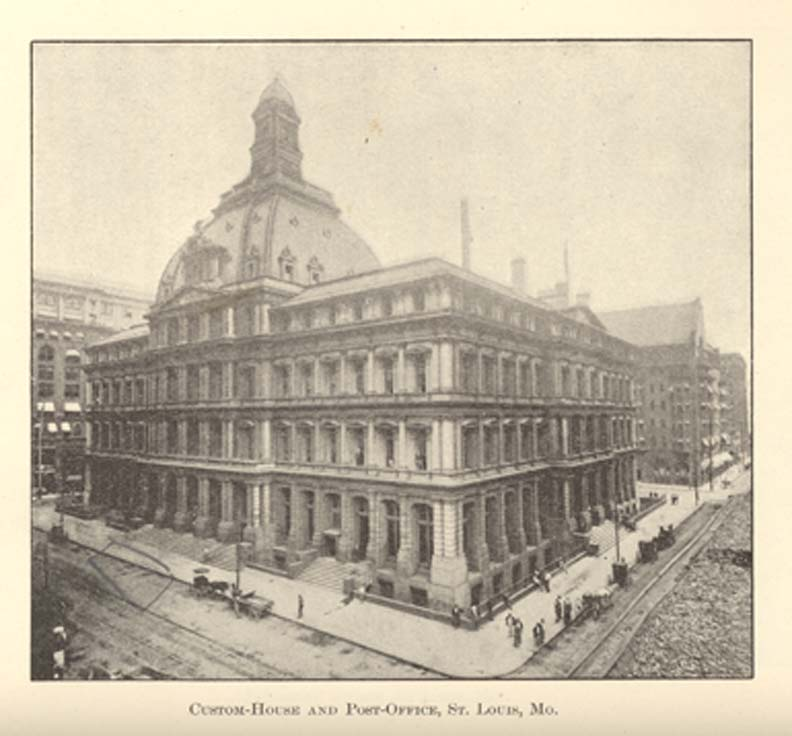

- Location within St. Louis Location within Missouri Location within the United States
- Location: 815 Olive St. St. Louis, Missouri
- Coordinates: 38°37′44″N 90°11′34″W
- Built: 1873-1884
- Architect: Alfred Bult Mullett
- Architectural style: Second Empire
- NRHP reference No.: 68000053

Significant dates
- Added to NRHP: November 22, 1968
- Designated NHL: December 30, 1970

The U.S. Custom House and Post Office is a court house at 815 Olive Street in downtown St. Louis, Missouri, United States. It was designed by architects Alfred B. Mullett, William Appleton Potter, and James G. Hill, and was constructed between 1873 and 1884. It is built in the Second Empire architectural style that was popular in the post American Civil War era and is located at the intersection of Eighth and Olive Streets.

The St. Louis Customhouse is one of four surviving Federal office buildings designed by Mullett. The others are the Eisenhower Executive Office Building, a part of the White House complex in Washington, D.C., the Century Post Office in Raleigh, North Carolina, and the U.S. Custom House in Portland, Maine. Mullett's other Second Empire buildings in Boston, Cincinnati, New York, and Philadelphia have been demolished.

== Description ==
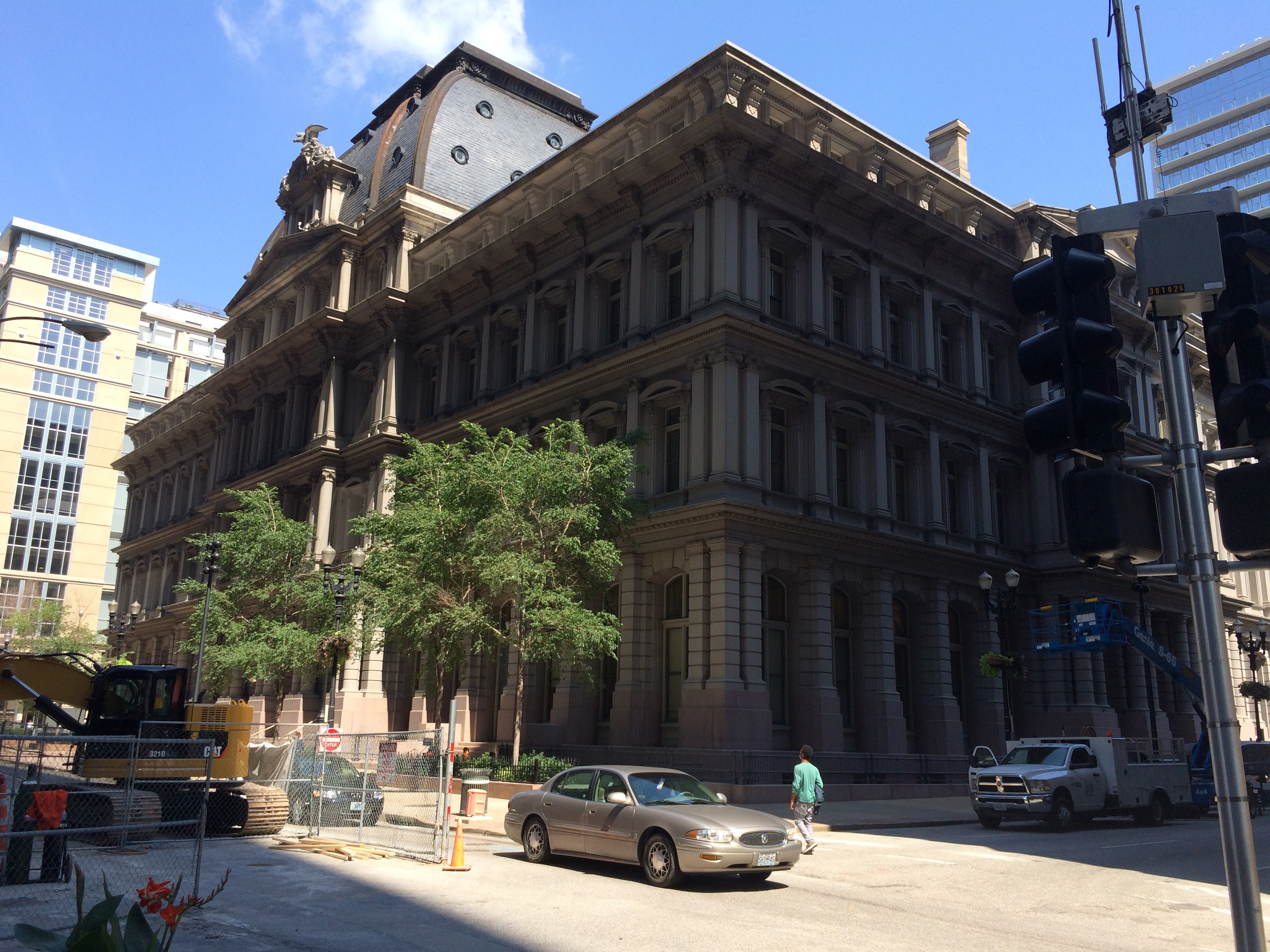
Photo taken from the southeast corner of the Old Post Office in St. Louis, Missouri. The photo shows the principal facade along Olive Street.

The three-story monumental granite building is 234 feet (71 m) long and 179 feet (55 m) deep. It includes a basement, sub-basement and attic level, with 16-foot (4.9 m) ceilings at the basement levels and 10-foot (3.0 m) thick foundation walls, which are surrounded by a 25-foot (7.6 m) deep dry moat for light and ventilation. The basement connects to a tunnel under 8th Street that was used for the delivery of mail to the post office. The basement material is red Missouri granite, while the upper floors are gray granite from Hurricane Island, Maine, between 3 feet (0.91 m) and 4 feet (1.2 m) in thickness. The building surrounds a skylit inner courtyard, 48 feet (15 m) by 55 feet (17 m).

High ceilings predominate in the main structure, with first floor ceilings at 26 feet (7.9 m) and second and third floors at 22 feet (6.7 m). Interior structure is a mixture of wrought and cast iron, supporting arched brick floors in a system that was referred to at the time of construction as "fireproof". The building's windows were provided with fireproof shutters.

The principal facade is the southern, along Olive Street, which features an iron mansard dome. Each street elevation features a central pavilion which in turn bears a portico. The Olive Street elevation's pediment is ornamented by the 1877 sculpture "America at War and America at Peace" by Daniel Chester French, his first major commission. Double-hung windows are set in cast iron frames throughout the building. Cast iron trim and molding frames interior sides of windows and doors. Interior detailing was extensive, with art glass panels, mosaic tile floors and bronze door knobs imprinted with the Seal of the United States. Thirty offices on the second, third and fourth floors featured red Bologna marble fireplace mantels.

== History ==
The Customhouse and Post Office was constructed under the supervision of architect James G, Hill and construction superintendent Thomas Walsh, for a total cost of $5,686,854.68. The third floor of building was occupied by the U.S District Court until 1935, when it moved to new quarters at 12th and Market streets. The Post Office remained until 1970, occupying the main basement and the first floor. A number of Federal agencies were housed on the fourth floor.

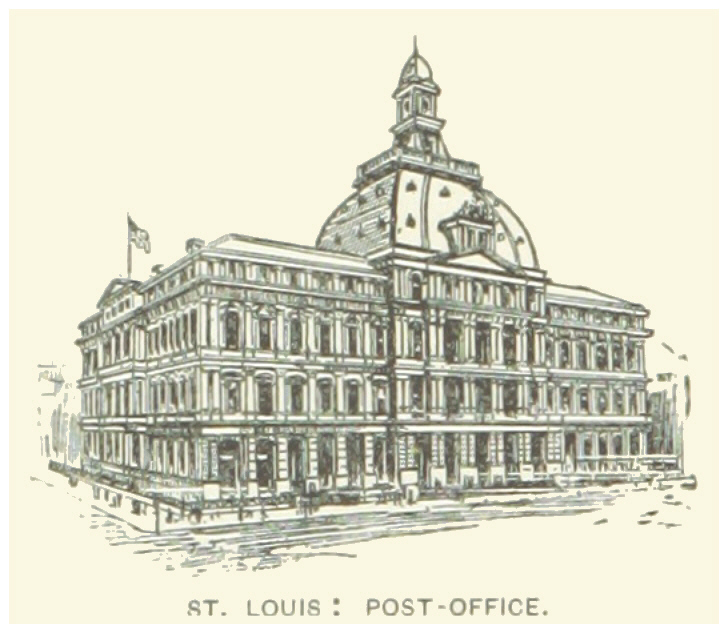

The United States District Court for the Eastern District of Missouri met at this courthouse until 1935, and the U.S. Circuit Court that district met here until that court was abolished in 1912. The U.S. Court of Appeals for the Eighth Circuit met here from 1891 until 1935. It was transferred from the U.S. General Services Administration to the State of Missouri through the Federal Historic Surplus Property Program in September 2004. It is currently a mixed-use facility serving federal, state, and private purposes. The building was the downtown campus for Webster University until the campus was relocated to the adjacent Arcade Building upon the completion of its renovation in late 2015. Soon after, Lindenwood University announced it would relocate its downtown campus to Webster University's former space. The Missouri Court of Appeals, Eastern District, also occupies the building.

== See also ==
- National Register of Historic Places listings in Downtown and Downtown West St. Louis
- List of National Historic Landmarks in Missouri
