= Bruff (disambiguation) =

Bruff is a town in County Limerick, Ireland.

Bruff may also refer to:

- Bruff GAA, Gaelic games club in the Irish town
- Bruff R.F.C., rugby union club near the Irish town
- Bruff (surname) (with a list of people of this name)
