= Mullett Rowhouses =

- U.S. National Register of Historic Places
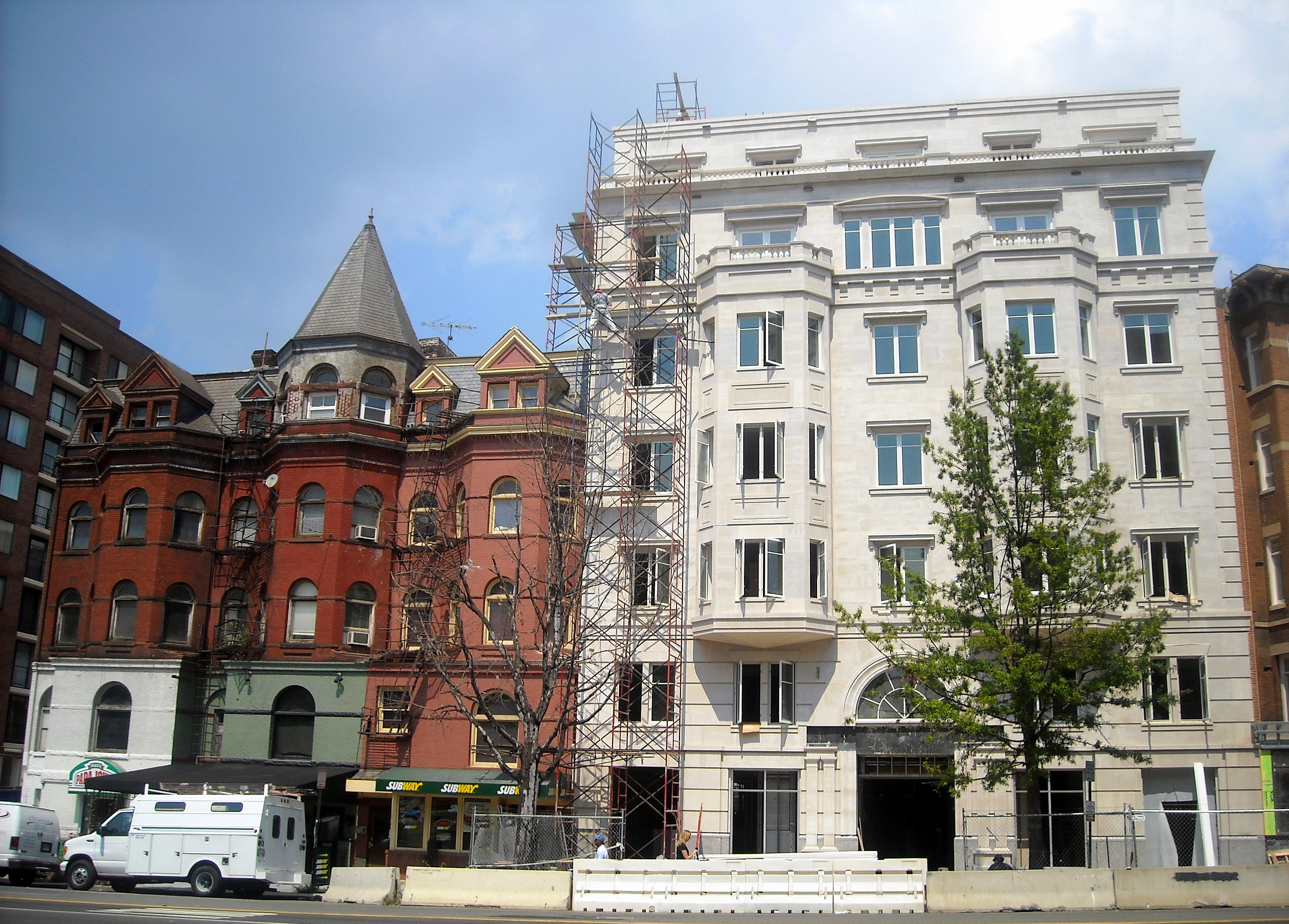

- Location within Washington, D.C.
- Location: 2517, 2519 and 2525 Pennsylvania Ave. NW; Washington, D.C.
- Coordinates: 38°54′15″N 77°3′16″W
- Built: 1889
- Architect: Alfred B. Mullett
- Architectural style: Queen Anne
- NRHP reference No.: 94001149
- Added to NRHP: September 30, 1994

The Mullett Rowhouses are historic structures, located at 2517, 2519 and 2525 Pennsylvania Ave. Northwest, Washington, D.C., in the West End neighborhood.

== History ==
Alfred B. Mullett designed these speculative luxury townhouses. Completed in 1889 in the Queen Anne style, the buildings are faced in red brick. Mullet, a prominent Washington architect who was responsible for the State, War, and Navy Building, was said to have committed suicide as a result of the financial difficulties associated with this project.

It has been listed on the District of Columbia Inventory of Historic Sites since 1990 and it was listed on the National Register of Historic Places in 1994.
