= City Hall Post Office and Courthouse (New York City) =

Courthouse in Manhattan (1869–1939)

Coordinates: 40°42′43″N 74°00′27″W

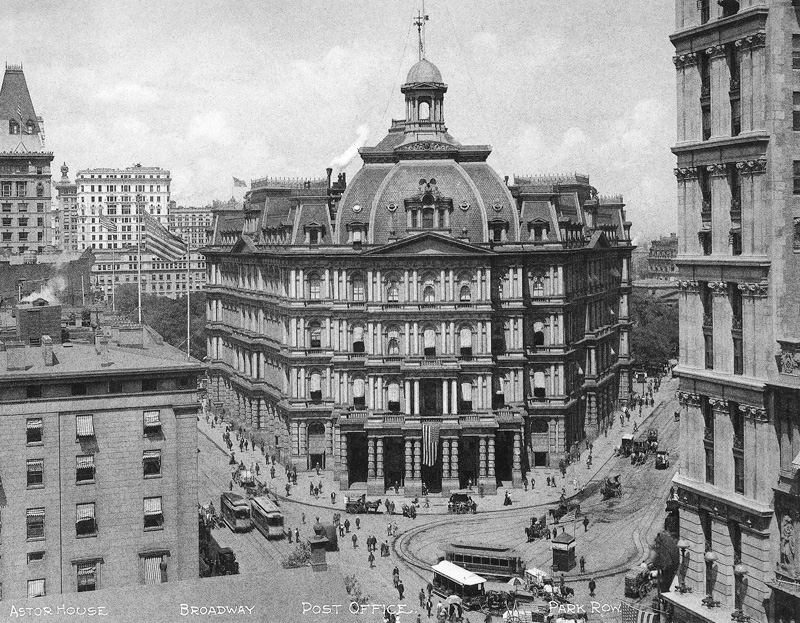
- City Hall Post Office c. 1906
- Interactive map of the City Hall Post Office and Courthouse area

General information
- Status: Demolished
- Architectural style: Second Empire style
- Location: Park Row; New York City, US
- Construction started: 1869
- Completed: 1880
- Demolished: 1939

Design and construction
- Architect: Alfred B. Mullett

The City Hall Post Office and Courthouse was designed by architect Alfred B. Mullett for a triangular site in New York City along Broadway in Civic Center, Lower Manhattan, in City Hall Park south of New York City Hall. The Second Empire style building, erected between 1869 and 1880, was not well received. Commonly called "Mullett's Monstrosity", it was demolished in 1939 and the site used to extend City Hall Park to the south.

== History ==
Since 1845, the city's main post office was located in the Middle Dutch Church on Nassau Street, a dark 18th-century building that by the 1860s was stretched past its capacity. Congress eventually approved funds for a new central post office, and a competition was held for design proposals. Fifty-two designs were submitted, but none were judged acceptable. Five firms—Richard Morris Hunt, Renwick and Sands, Napoleon LeBrun, Schulze and Schoen, and John Perret—were selected to collaborate on a single design.

Together, the firms produced a Second Empire concept that borrowed from Renwick's Corcoran Gallery of Art and the New York State Capitol. Feeling the proposed design was too expensive, Mullett took over the project, which nonetheless cost $8.5 million. This coup may have influenced opinions on his final product. The iron framing was clad with a pale granite quarried in Dix Island, Knox County, Maine.

Regarding the building's lack of popularity, The New York Times wrote in 1912:

The Mullett Post Office has always been an architectural eyesore, and has, from the first, been unsatisfactory to the Postal Service and the Federal Courts beneath its roof.

Built in five stories (the fifth in its mansard roof) with a basement for sorting mail and a subbasement for machinery, the building housed the main New York Post Office, as well as courtrooms and federal offices on its third and fourth floors. It had pneumatic tubes for efficient mail transfer to other post offices. Unfortunately, the cramped trapezoidal site required the post office's loading docks to be on the side facing City Hall and the park. The building's French Second Empire style and architectural vocabulary were similar to its surviving siblings, the Old Post Office in St. Louis, Missouri, and the Old Executive Office Building in Washington, D.C.

On May 1, 1877, during the building's construction, three workers were killed when a concrete slab collapsed, prompting an investigation by the city and a public rebuttal of accusations of misconduct from Mullett.

The building's former site is directly across Broadway from the Woolworth Building. With the passage of time and changing tastes, architectural criticism now regards the City Hall Post Office as one of Mullett's best works, providing a now-missing defining element at the bottom of City Hall Park.

== See also ==
- James Farley Post Office, successor to the City Hall Post Office as New York's main post office
