= Joseph Goldsborough Bruff =

American architect

J. Goldsborough Bruff
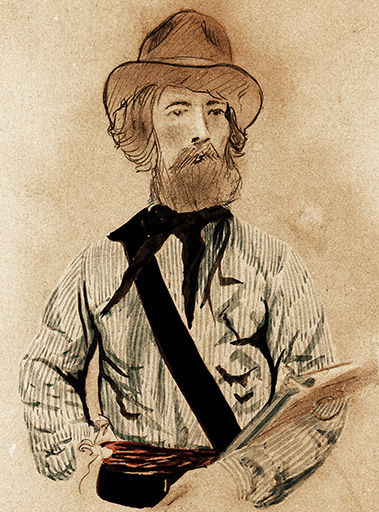
- Self portrait of Captain Bruff
- Born: October 2, 1804; Washington, D.C., U.S.
- Died: April 14, 1889 (aged 84); Washington, D.C., U.S.
- Occupations: Draftsman and cartography
- Known for: Leading 1849 expedition to California

Joseph Goldsborough Bruff (October 2, 1804 – April 14, 1889) was an amateur artist and adventurer as well as a professional draftsman and cartographer. He attended West Point for two years before becoming a merchant seaman. He later served as a draftsman for the United States Navy and a mapmaker for the United States Army. In 1849, he formed the Washington City and California Mining Association and led an expedition to California seeking gold. He kept a detailed journal of the expedition that was later published in two volumes. After returning from California, Bruff worked as an architectural designer in the United States Department of the Treasury.

== Early life ==
Bruff was born in the City of Washington, District of Columbia on 2 October 1804. He was the son of Thomas and Mary Bruff. His father was a well-known physician and dentist, who invented and patented several dental equipment items, along with the coffee grinder. He grew up in a large house on the corner of Pennsylvania Avenue and 21st Street in downtown Washington. As a child, Bruff witnessed the British invasion of Washington during the War of 1812.

In 1820, Bruff was appointed to West Point. However, he was forced to resign after only two years because he was involved in a duel, which was a serious violation of military regulations. After leaving West Point, he signed onto the crew of a merchant ship as a cabin boy. He spent the next five years traveling around the world as an itinerant seaman. This included at least three years as an acting Master's Mate on a United States Navy Ship.

== Career ==
Bruff returned to Washington in 1827. Deciding to give up sea travels, he took a job as a draftsman at the Gosport Navy Yard in Norfolk, Virginia. He remained in this position with minor promotions until 1837. Feeling that he was underpaid, Bruff took a new drafting job with the United States Army at nearby Fortress Monroe, where he stayed for about two years.

Sometime in 1839, Bruff took a new job with the Army's Bureau of Topographical Engineers back in Washington. In this position, he made numerous maps for Army reports that were published and sent to Congress. He made hand-copied duplicates of original field maps delivered to the bureau by Army topographical engineers returning from their journeys in the West. He also engraved maps and drawings for publication. One of his most important projects was to make copies of all of the maps and drawings that were included in Captain John C. Frémont's report to Congress. During the course of his work, Bruff got to know Frémont and many other topographical engineers when they returned from exploring the West. He also made the military maps used in the Mexican–American War. Bruff remained with the bureau for the next decade.

== California expedition ==
In 1849, the news of gold discoveries in California swept through Washington. This rekindled Bruff's desire for travel and adventure. He organized the Washington City and California Mining Association and planned an expedition to California with the stated purpose of mining gold and conducting trade. The association had many investors, and they financed a well-equipped expedition. Bruff was elected captain of the expedition. While it was an unofficial title, Bruff was called "Captain" for the rest of his life.

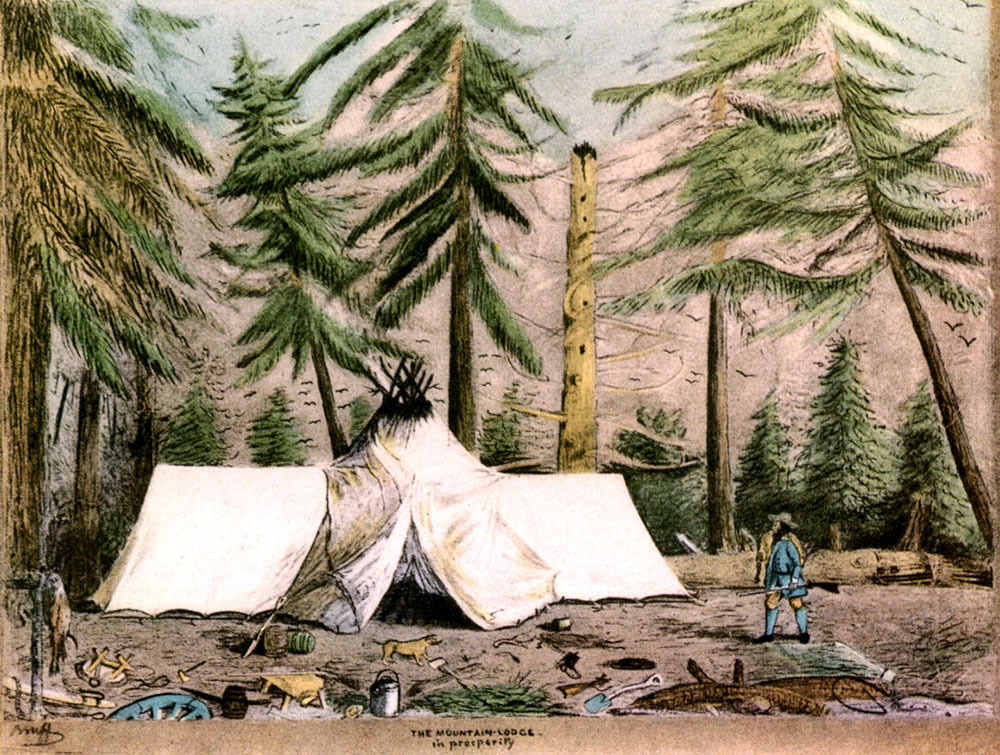
Bruff's camp in the Sierra Nevada Mountains

As the leader of the expedition, Bruff purchased fourteen large wagons, mules, tents, armaments, and other supplies for the trek to California. On 2 April 1849, he led the expedition's sixty-six men, all in matching uniforms, in a farewell parade through the streets of Washington. On the way out of the city, Bruff stopped at the White House and met with President Zachary Taylor.

During the expedition, Bruff kept extensive journals that recorded the details of the expedition's travels. He also made many drawings of the things he saw along the trail. He recorded his meeting with Colonel Benjamin Bonneville at Fort Kearny. He sketched Fort Laramie in Wyoming and Fort Hall in Idaho along with important geographic features like Chimney Rock in Nebraska. He also made drawings of numerous less important hills, canyons, river crossings, and hot springs. Bruff made many drawings of camp life and recorded grave markers he encountered along the trail.

The expedition followed the Lassen Trail into California. After arriving in the state, the expedition broke up, leaving Bruff to spend a very difficult winter in the Sierra Nevada Mountains. While in California, Bruff got to know Peter Lassen very well. He then traveled around California's gold country, making many drawings of geographic landmarks, mining camps, and other interesting scenes. He left California in June 1851 by sea, arriving in New York City a month later. Some of his luggage was stolen from the dock at New York harbor, but none of his journals or drawings were lost.

== Later life ==
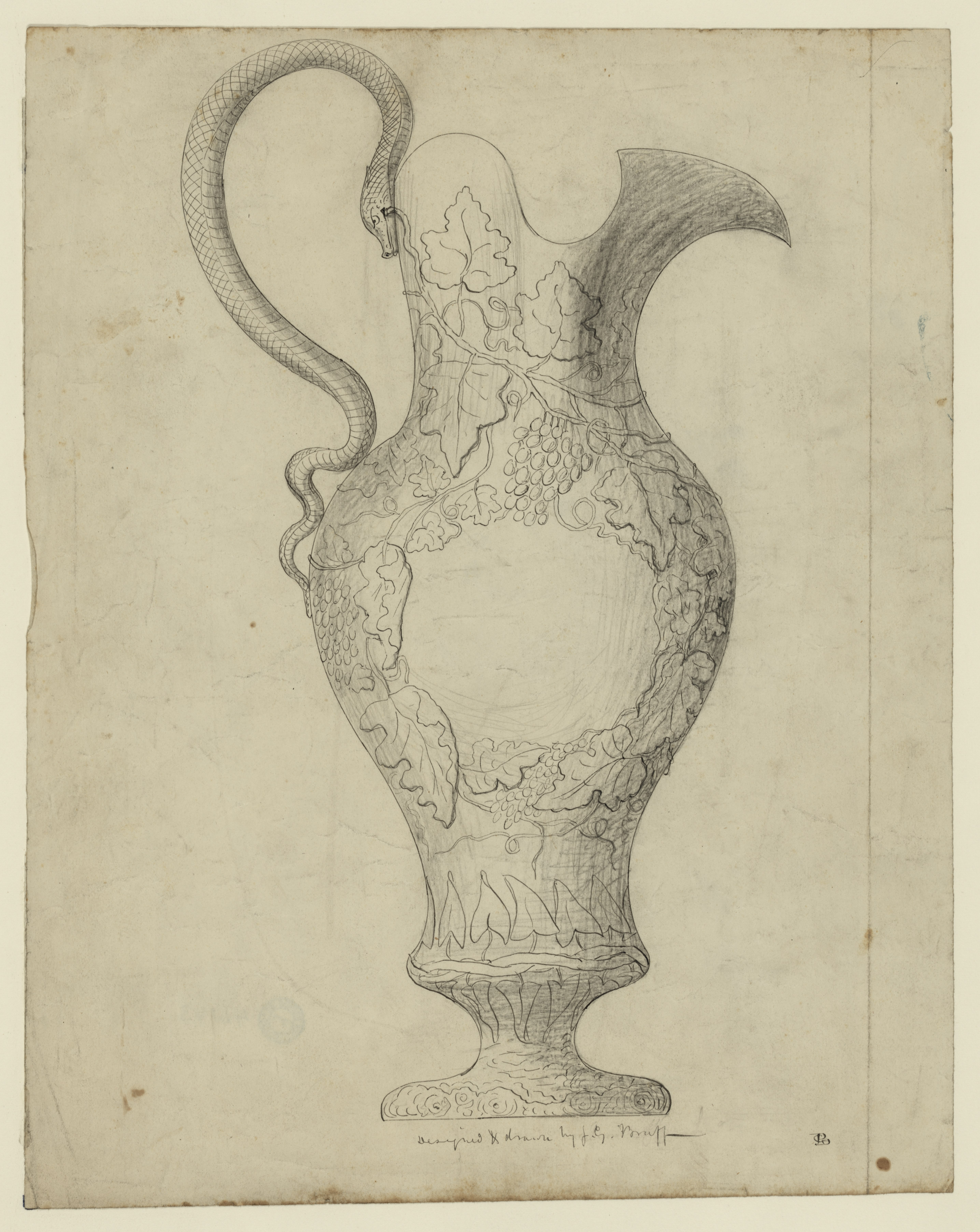
Vase, 1824

After returning to Washington, Bruff went to work as a draftsman in the office of the supervising architect in the United States Department of the Treasury. In that position, he designed the ornamentation for the south and west wings of the Treasury building in Washington as well as architectural ornamentation for Treasury offices throughout the country. During his tenure in the office, he served under supervising architects Ammi B. Young, Isaiah Rogers, and Alfred B. Mullett. Bruff did not get along with Mullett and left the office in 1869, transferring to the department's registry office. He returned to the Treasury architect's office in 1876 to serve under his friend James G. Hill. By 1887, Bruff was the oldest employee of the United States Government. He remained in his Treasury position until he became ill in early 1889.

Bruff was an active member of the National Institute for the Promotion of Science, which eventually became part of the Smithsonian Institution. He was a member of the National Art Association, serving as the organization's secretary for a time. He was also a member of the Washington Monument Association and a lifelong Mason. In addition, Bruff was a member of the Society of the Oldest Inhabitants of Washington City. As a prominent member of the society, he was selected to give the keynote address at the city's Washington birthday celebration held at the city hall in 1874. That same year, Bruff became a founding member of the Washington Association of Engineers and Architects, a professional organization for architects and building engineers.

Bruff was an avid reader. His personal library included 322 volumes covering a wide range of topics including history, travel, many scientific works, philosophy, religion, fine arts, and literature. He also kept a private artifact collection of ancient coins, Native American weapons and tools, geological specimens, animal tusks, original letters from notable Americans, and mementos from historical sites as well as portraits of famous people he admired.

Bruff's daughter, Zuleima, also became a painter, after studying with her father.

== Death and legacy ==
Bruff died on 14 April 1889 at his home in Washington. His funeral was held on 17 April. He is buried at the National Congressional Cemetery in Washington. After his death, his writings were published in a two volume set of books titled Gold Rush: The Journals, Drawings, and Other Papers of J. Goldsborough Bruff. The two volumes cover the period of 2 April 1849, when his California expedition left Washington, until 20 July 1851, when he returned to the city.

Today, significant collections of his original drawing and papers are held by the National Archives, the Library of Congress, the Huntington Library, Yale University Library, and the Smithsonian. In addition, there are at least 16 art books that discuss his art work or include copies of his paintings and illustrations.
