= Greystone (Knoxville, Tennessee) =

Historic home in Knoxville, Tennessee

- Camp House
- U.S. National Register of Historic Places
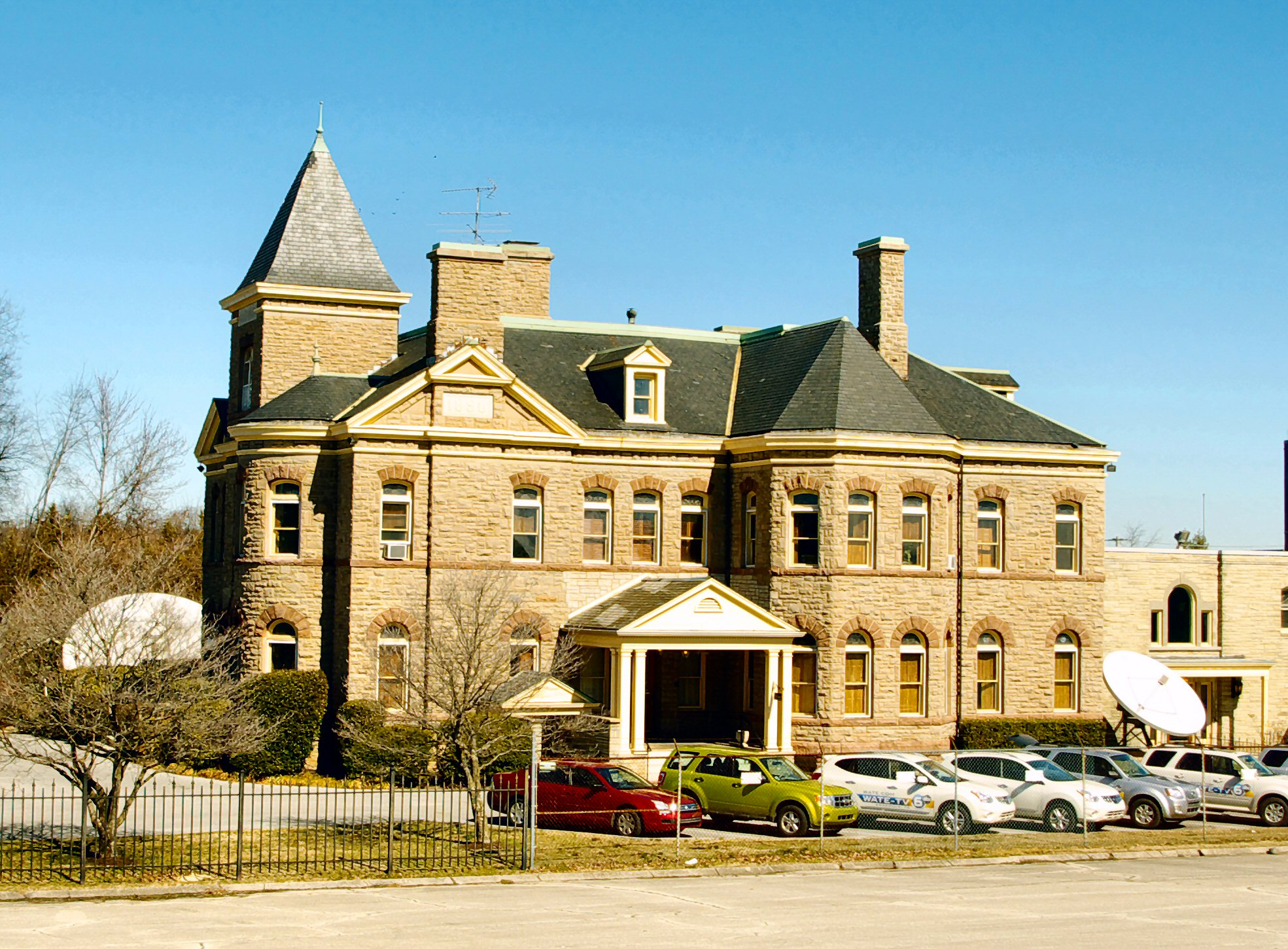
- Location: Knoxville, Tennessee
- Coordinates: 35°59′6.58″N 83°55′16.31″W
- Built: 1890
- Architect: Alfred B. Mullett
- Architectural style: Romanesque
- NRHP reference No.: 73001800
- Added to NRHP: April 24, 1973

Greystone, also called the Camp House, is a prominent historic home in Knoxville, Tennessee, that houses the studios and offices of WATE-TV. It is listed on the National Register of Historic Places. The mansion is located at 1306 Broadway.

== History ==
Major Eldad Cicero Camp began constructing his home in 1885. Architect Alfred B. Mullett designed the mansion in the Richardsonian Romanesque style. Mullett had previously designed the Customs House building in downtown Knoxville. The home is two and a half stories, with a three-story tower in the front. The exterior of the home is sheathed in stone from a quarry in Rocky Top, Tennessee. The home contains elaborate hand-carved mantels from France. Each room is paneled in a different type of wood. The heads of windows include stained glass panels, and 22 different types of marble are used in the house. The site also includes a carriage house.

Major Camp was born in Ohio, served in the Union Army during the Civil War, made Knoxville his home and was appointed a U.S. District Attorney by President Ulysses S. Grant.

The Camp family used the home until 1935. When Camp's heirs were no longer able to maintain the house, they sold some of the furnishings and subdivided the mansion into apartments. The condition of the building declined during its rental use, until WATE-TV purchased the building in 1965 at a cost of $75,000. The mansion was restored and renovated for use by the television station. The restoration and renovation process took two years and cost $1.5 million. The first floor of the building was preserved and restored largely in its original form. A 13,000-square-foot (1,200 m^{2}) addition on the back of the building housed the station's studios. In April 1973, Greystone was added to the National Register of Historic Places.
