= Federal Building (Raleigh, North Carolina) =

- U.S. National Register of Historic Places
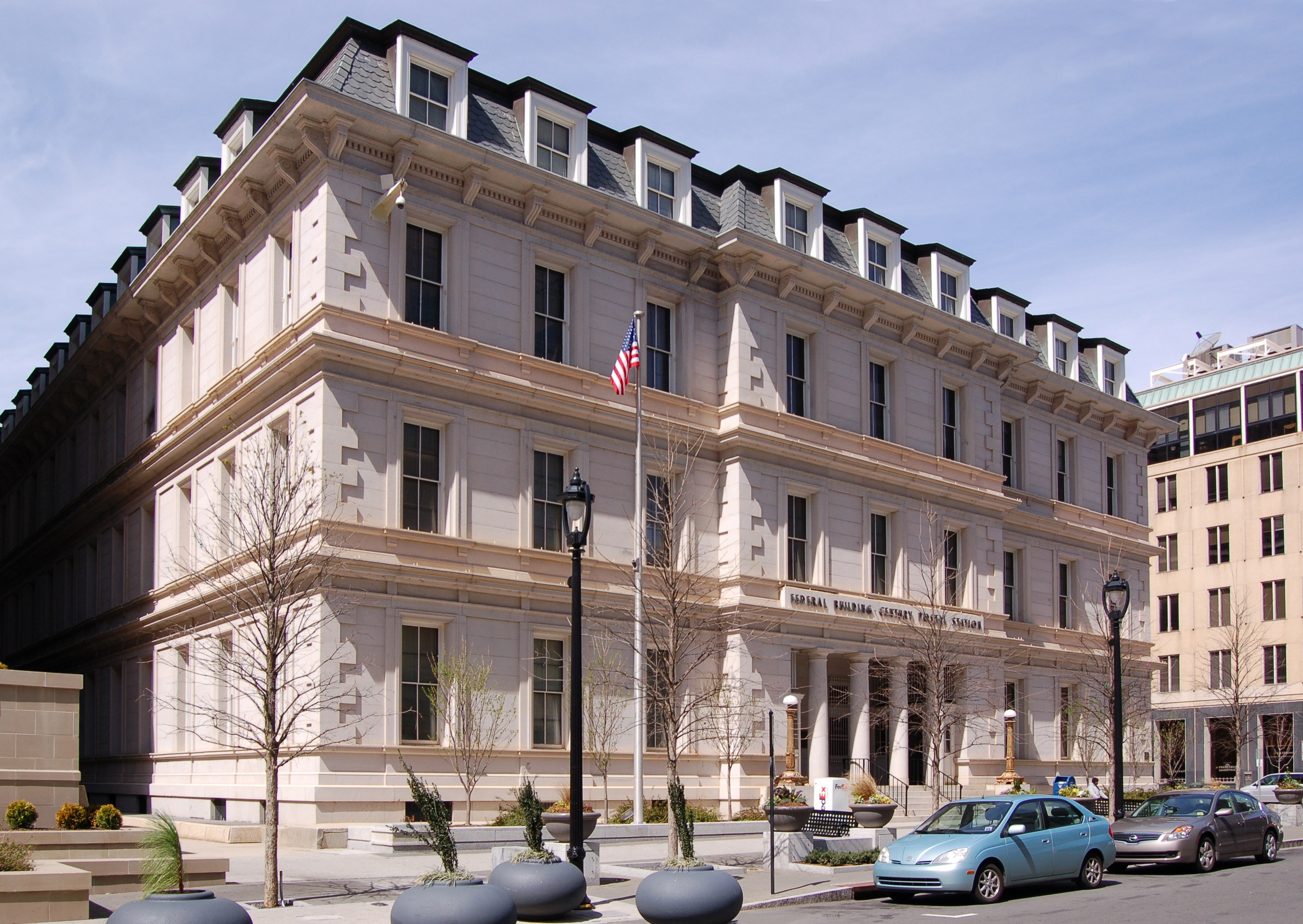

- Location within North Carolina Location within the United States
- Location: 300 Fayetteville St., Raleigh, North Carolina
- Coordinates: 35°46′37.89″N 78°38′40.01″W
- Area: 0.5 acres (0.20 ha)
- Built: 1874
- Architect: Alfred B. Mullet
- Architectural style: Second Empire
- Part of: Fayetteville Street Historic District
- NRHP reference No.: 71000624
- Added to NRHP: May 6, 1971

The Federal Building, also known as the Century Post Office, is a historic building located on Fayetteville Street in Raleigh, Wake County, North Carolina, United States. It was the first Federal Government project in the South following the Civil War. Construction of the building began in 1874 and was completed in 1878. The building's Second Empire design was by Alfred B. Mullett whose more famous works included the Old Executive Office Building located near the White House. The Federal Building was listed on the National Register of Historic Places in 1971 and is a Raleigh Historic Landmark.

After completion of the building, local offices of federal agencies, such as the post office, were located on the first floor. The United States District Court was located on the second floor and at the time was considered the best fitted courtroom in North Carolina. In 1913, the building was doubled in size to accommodate the effects of city growth. The building was renovated and its original materials and most of its detailing were replicated. In 1939, the building was expanded with the same exterior design being applied to the new addition.

Federal Government agencies grew rapidly after World War II. Due to this growth, the majority of the offices located in the Federal Building were moved to rented facilities located throughout Raleigh. A new Federal Building was constructed downtown to consolidate the agencies in 1970. The facility also became the new home of the court and post office's administrative facility. In 1978, the original Federal Building was renovated and renamed Century Station to commemorate the 100th anniversary of its opening. Currently, it serves as a post office for downtown Raleigh and as the United States Bankruptcy Court.

== See also ==
- List of Registered Historic Places in North Carolina
