= Indian Treaty Room =

Room in government building, Washington D.C.

Coordinates: 38.8972°N 77.0385°W

The Indian Treaty Room

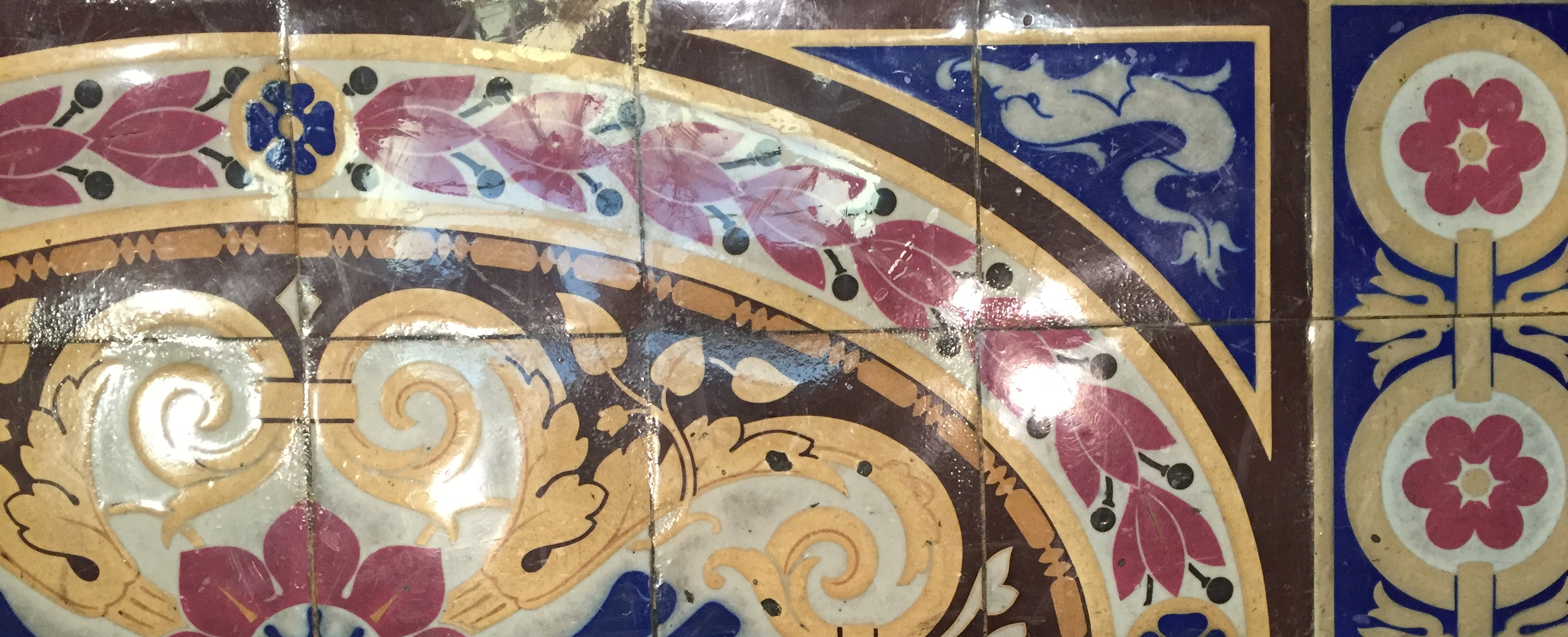
A section of the tile in the room

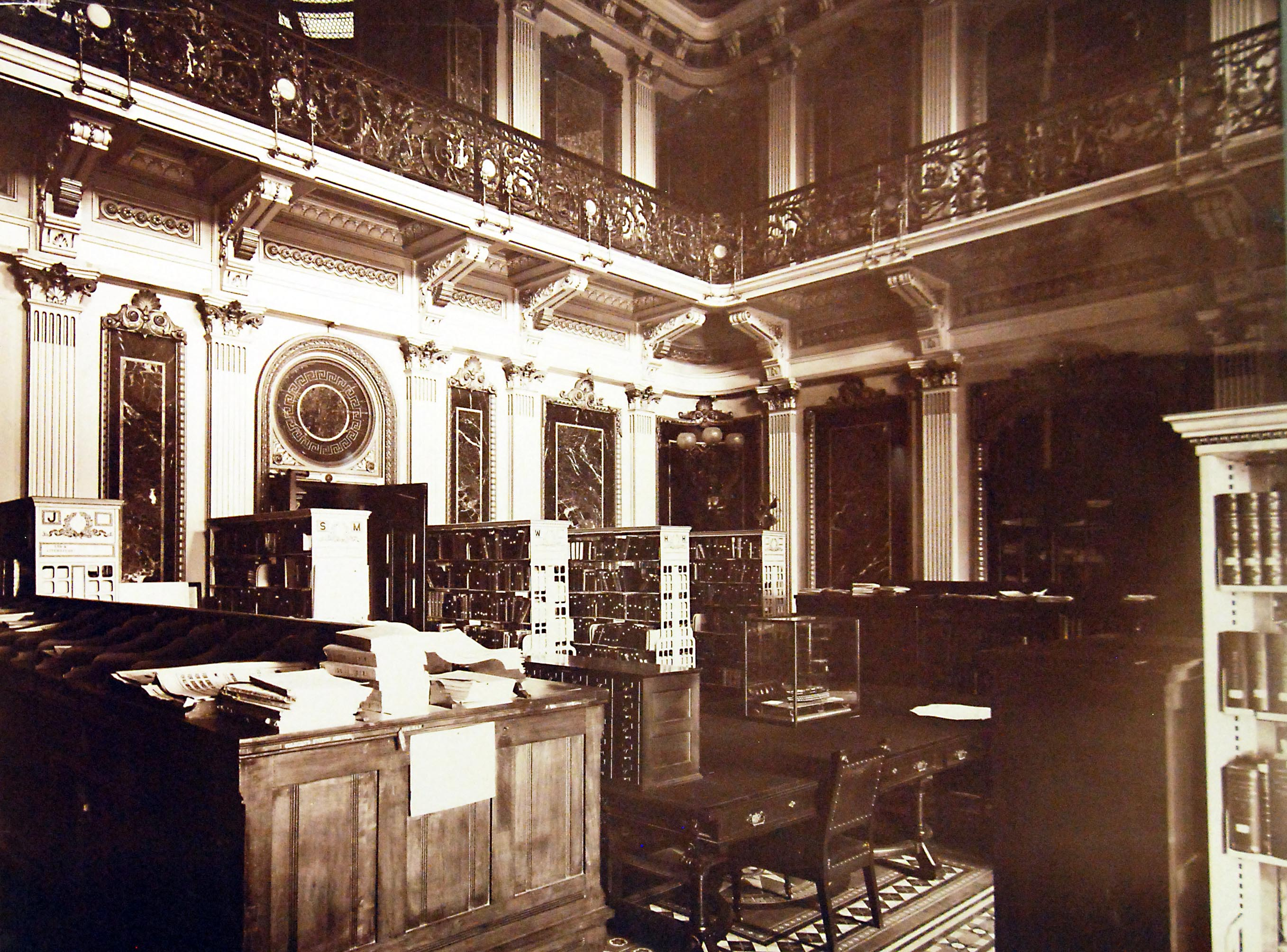
The Indian Treaty Room as seen during its time as the Navy Department Library

The Indian Treaty Room (originally known as the Navy Department Library and Reception Room) is located in the East Wing of the Eisenhower Executive Office Building. It was designed by Richard von Ezdorf, Draftsman for the Supervising Architect of the Treasury. Completed in 1879, it cost more to construct than any other room in the building at about $33.50 per square foot (total $55,675.00). The room has been used as a library, but today is primarily used for meetings and receptions.

The design of the room includes many nautical motifs, such as shells over the Italian and French marble panels; seahorses and dolphins in the cast iron railings on the second floor balcony; stars for navigation in the ceiling; and the compass in the center of the floor. The floor is the original English Minton tile floor. The room contains the only surviving original lighting fixtures in the building.

President Dwight D. Eisenhower held the first televised presidential press conference in the room in January 1955. It was subsequently used for presidential press conferences from 1955 until 1961. On September 12, 2001, the room was used to host the American Red Cross for an emergency blood drive so the White House staff could donate blood in response to the September 11 attacks. In 2001–2002, the room was used for the White House's Coalition Information Center, which coordinated media relations and relief efforts during Operation Enduring Freedom.

The origin of the name "Indian Treaty Room," which dates from the 1930s, is unclear. It may have been applied because the Navy had used the room to store documents including treaties with tribal nations.

The Bretton Woods agreements, the peace treaties with Italy, Hungary, and Romania after World War II, and the United Nations Charter were all signed in the room.
