= Bruff (surname) =

Bruff is a surname. Notable people with the surname include:

- Charles Mackenzie Bruff (1887–1955), Norwegian chemist
- Joseph Goldsborough Bruff (1804–1889), American draftsman and cartographer
- Jules Bruff, American actress and filmmaker
- Peter Bruff (1812–24 February 1900), English civil engineer
