= Zuleima Jackson =

American painter

Zuleima Bruff Jackson
- Born: October 9, 1843; Washington, D.C., U.S.
- Died: February 16, 1915; Washington, D.C., U.S.
- Known for: Floral painting
- Spouse: John Jackson

Zuleima Bruff Jackson (October 9, 1843 – February 16, 1915) was an American painter, largely of floral pieces. Daughter of Joseph Goldsborough Bruff, she was born in Washington, D.C., and was taught by her father to be a "Designing Artist". In 1861 she married Danish immigrant John Jackson, a brevet major in the United States Army. She continued to live in Washington until her death. Two of her drawings are in the Library of Congress.
