= United States Post Office (Evansville, Indiana) =

- Evansville Post Office
- U.S. National Register of Historic Places
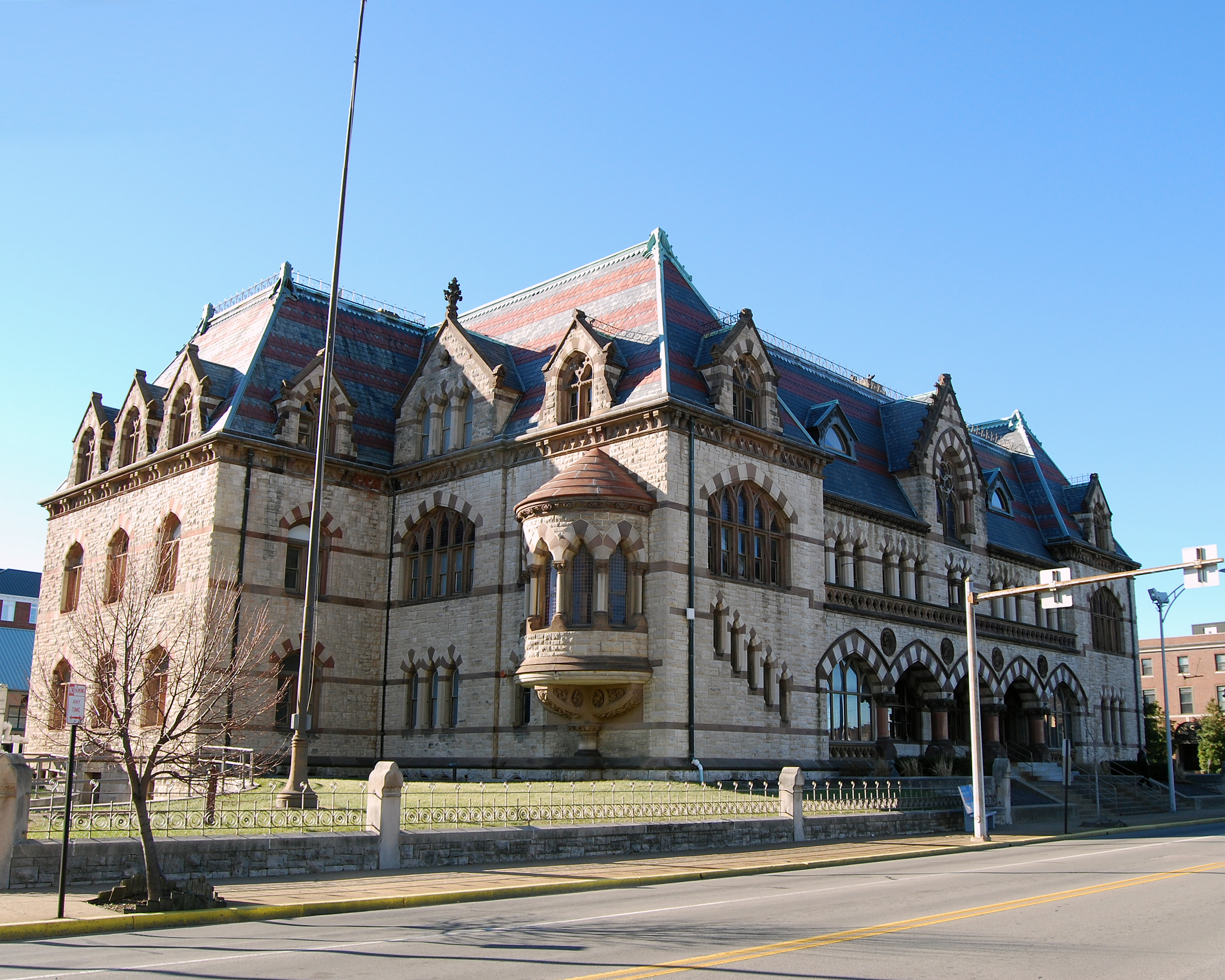
- Evansville Post Office, December 2008

- Location within Indiana Location within the United States
- Location: 100 block N.W. 2nd St., Evansville, Indiana
- Coordinates: 37°58′17″N 87°34′17″W
- Area: 1 acre (0.40 ha)
- Built: 1876-79; 1918
- Architect: Office of the Supervising Architect
- Architectural style: Gothic, Ruskinian Gothic
- NRHP reference No.: 71000010
- Added to NRHP: July 2, 1971

Evansville Post Office, also known as the Customs House, is a historic post office building located in downtown Evansville, Indiana.

== History and architecture ==
The Evansville Post Office is a three-story, Ruskinian Gothic style limestone building over a basement. It features a front arcade, oriel window, slate roof, and contrasting brownstone details. The building was designed by architects and engineers in the Office of the Supervising Architect under Alfred B. Mullett and William Appleton Potter, with significant revisions by Potter to Mullett's Second Empire design. Construction began under Potter in 1876, and was completed by his successor, James G. Hill, in 1879. The building originally housed facilities for the United States Post Office, the United States District Court for the District of Indiana, the United States Customs Service, the United States Weather Bureau, and other agencies, though several of these would later move to other locations. In 1918 the building was extended with flanking wings in a style matching the original.

It was added to the National Register of Historic Places in 1971. After a new federal building was opened in 1968, the building was sold and is now (2022) known as Old Post Office Plaza and used as office and event space.

== See also ==
- List of United States post offices
