= United States Custom House and Post Office (Cincinnati) =

Former building in Cincinnati, Ohio, U.S.

Coordinates: 39°05′58.7″N 84°30′46.4″W

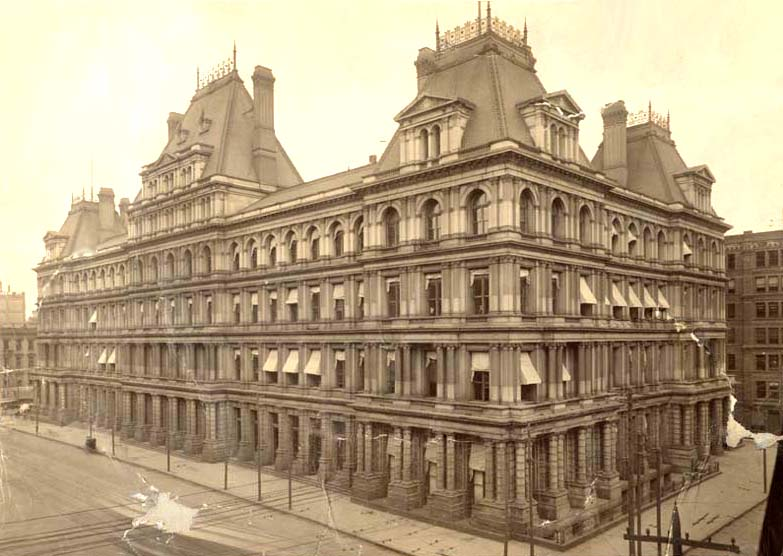
United States Custom House and Post Office in 1900

The United States Custom House and Post Office in Cincinnati, Ohio, served as the main federal presence in that city from its construction, completed in 1885, until its demolition in 1936, to make way for a successor building. It was the location of the United States Custom House, and the United States District Court for the Southern District of Ohio. The United States Court of Appeals for the Sixth Circuit met here from 1891 until 1936.

== History ==
Cincinnati's first federal building, located at the southwest corner of Fourth and Vine Streets, was bought in 1851 in response to a general demand in the city that scattered Federal offices be assembled. Construction of that first building took seven years and cost $339,183. Then, after 27 years of use, the site and structure were sold in 1879 for $100,000 to make way for the Merchants' Exchange.

Even before the Government became responsive to the growing city's demand for a larger building and began to take an interest in Fifth Street as a site, the section now embraced by Fountain Square and Government Square had assumed historic importance. Three Presidents - James Monroe, Andrew Jackson and John Quincy Adams - had visited it. Abraham Lincoln had spoken there. The fountain and esplanade were installed in the early 1870s, becoming leading attractions of the city. It seemed a good place for a Federal Building, then as now. However, business men in the "Bottoms" complained when the move to Fifth Street was proposed. They contended Fifth Street was too far from the business center of the city.

The site was acquired by condemnation and cost the Government $708,026. The act authorizing construction of a new building was passed by Congress, March 18, 1872, and signed by President Ulysses S. Grant immediately, but it was not until April, 1874, that the last of the business houses on the land had been torn down. Excavation for foundations, done entirely by hand labor, required another year. The building was erected under the supervision of the Architect of the Treasury, Alfred B. Mullett. In all, it took 11 years to complete construction. Its cost was $5,088,328.

Nearly half a century went by, and then again, in the 1930s, the demand arose for suitable and adequate quarters for the growing services of the Federal Government in Cincinnati. The old building, completed in 1885 to house 27 departments, had grown too small. A new building was the answer, although the new structure would technically be smaller than the previous structure. The new courthouse (eventually named the Potter Stewart United States Courthouse) had 6,640,000 cubic feet (188,000 m^{3}) where the original building had 7,883,500. However, the working area in the new courthouse was 485,000 square feet (45,100 m^{2}) as against 240,000 in the old - more than double the working space in a smaller building. Part of the explanation is to be found in the fact that the new building was nine stories, where the old had only five, although the height of the old was virtually the same. The cost of the new courthouse was approximately $3,170,000.

== See also ==
- Customs house
