= Alfred B. Mullett =

American architect (1834-1890)

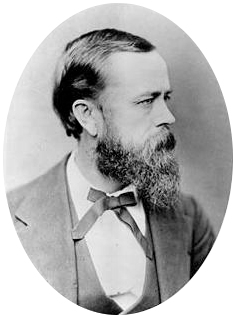
- Born: April 7, 1834; Taunton, England
- Died: October 20, 1890 (aged 56); Washington, D.C., U.S.
- Occupation: Architect
- Parent: Augustine A. Mullett
- Buildings: Pioneer Courthouse, Portland, Oregon; Old Executive Office Building, Washington, D.C. Old Custom House and Post Office, St. Louis, Missouri; Old San Francisco Mint; Custom House, Knoxville, Tennessee; Federal Building, Raleigh, North Carolina; Camp House

Signature
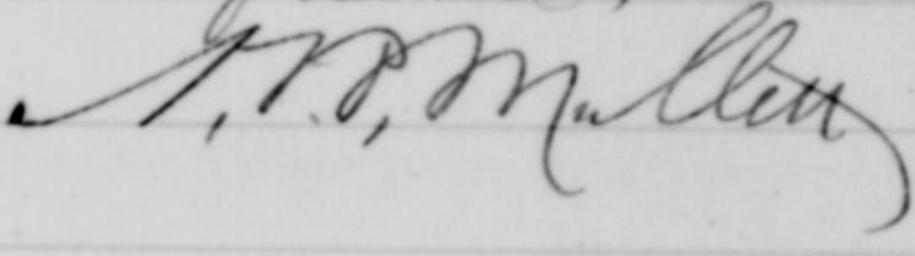

Alfred Bult Mullett (April 7, 1834 – October 20, 1890) was a British-American architect who served from 1866 to 1874 as Supervising Architect, head of the agency of the United States Treasury Department that designed federal government buildings. His work followed trends in Victorian style, evolving from the Greek Revival to Second Empire to Richardsonian Romanesque.

== Biography ==
Mullett was born at Taunton in Somerset, England. When he was eight years old, his family immigrated to Glendale, Ohio, where in 1843 his father bought an 80-acre (32 hectares) farm. He matriculated at Farmers' College in College Hill, Cincinnati, studied mathematics and mechanical drawing, but left as a sophomore in 1854. He trained in the Cincinnati office of architect Isaiah Rogers and became a partner.

== Career ==
Mullett left Rogers on less than friendly terms in 1860, to establish his own practice. His first known individual design is the Church of the New Jerusalem, a board-and-batten Gothic Revival church built at Glendale in 1861.

After serving with the Union army during the American Civil War, Mullett in 1863 relocated to Washington. He worked again with Rogers, since 1862 the de facto Supervising Architect at the Treasury Department. At that time the Treasury Department oversaw design and construction of all federal buildings. Mullett undermined his superior's position until an exasperated Rogers resigned in 1865. That year Mullet married Pacific Pearl Myrick.

Although widely dismissed as "an obscure draftsman" from Cincinnati, Mullett used his political skills to gain appointment as Supervising Architect in 1866. He designed fireproof federal buildings across the nation, particularly custom houses, post offices and courthouses. Responsible for contracting with local architects and/or construction companies to deal with subcontractors, source materials and other matters, Mullett was known as a micromanaging authoritarian with an explosive temper.

Influenced by the 1864–1868 remodeling of the Louvre's Pavillon de Flore by Hector Lefuel and Richard Morris Hunt, Mullett produced six massive fortress-like Second Empire federal buildings in St. Louis, Boston, Cincinnati, New York, Philadelphia, and Washington D.C. What was called the State, War, and Navy Building rose near the White House. These stone and cast iron structures, with mansard roofs and multiple tiers of columns, were expensive. Mullett was dogged by accusations of extravagance and subjected to five separate investigations into his ties to the corrupt "Granite Ring".

Mullett reluctantly resigned in 1874 while under attack from reforming Treasury Secretary Benjamin Bristow and others. When three men were killed on May 1, 1877, by a floor failure at the City Hall Post Office, New York City, which had been constructed under his supervision, Mullett was investigated for negligence.

In 1882, he set up a practice in New York with Hugo Kafka and William G. Steinmetz, later establishing Alfred B. Mullett & Sons to practice with his two elder sons. But the government never paid him for major commissions, and he remained a popular political target. The New York Sun called him "the most arrogant, pretentious, and preposterous little humbug in the United States." In 1890, in financial trouble and ill health, Mullett killed himself in Washington.

Over his career he produced some 40 government buildings. Two of the six huge Second Empire buildings survive in St. Louis and Washington. The New York City Hall Post Office was dubbed "Mullett's monstrosity." Following another shift in popular taste, however, he is recognized since the late 20th century for his contribution to monumental Victorian architecture.

== Death ==
Mullet died by suicide in 1890 after a period of ill health.

== Works ==
- 1861 — Church of the New Jerusalem, Glendale, Ohio
- 1866-1870 — Carson City Mint, Carson City, Nevada
- 1867 — Courthouse and Post Office, Madison, Wisconsin
- 1867 — Post Office, Portland, Maine (demolished 1965)
- 1867-1870 — Custom House and Post Office, Ogdensburg, New York
- 1868-1871 — Office Building and U.S. Light-House Depot Complex, St. George, Staten Island, New York
- 1869-1870 – Old Custom House and Post Office, Wiscasset, Maine
- 1869-1873 — Post Office and Sub-Treasury Building Boston, Massachusetts (demolished c. 1929)
- 1869-1874 — San Francisco Mint, San Francisco, California (survived the San Francisco earthquake, 1906)
- 1869-1880 — City Hall Post Office and Courthouse, New York City (demolished 1939)
- 1869-1875 — Pioneer Courthouse, Portland, Oregon
- 1870 — Courthouse and Post Office (now City Hall), Columbia, South Carolina
- 1871-1888 — State, War, and Navy Building aka Old Executive Office Building aka Eisenhower Executive Office Building, Washington, D.C.
- 1871-1881 – U.S. Custom House (New Orleans), Louisiana
- 1871 — US Assay Office, Boise, Idaho
- 1872 — Custom House and Post Office, Cairo, Illinois
- 1872 — US Custom House, Portland, Maine
- 1873-1879 — Post Office and Customs House, Evansville, Indiana
- 1873-1884 — Old Post Office, St. Louis, Missouri
- 1874 — Customs House, Knoxville, Tennessee
- 1874-1885 — United States Custom House and Post Office (Cincinnati), Cincinnati, Ohio (demolished c. 1936)
- 1874-1884 — Courthouse and Post Office, Philadelphia, Pennsylvania (demolished c. 1942)
- 1874-1878 — Federal Building, Raleigh, North Carolina
- 1876-1879 – Evansville Post Office, Evansville, Indiana
- 1877 — Custom House and Post Office, Port Huron, Michigan
- 1873-1882 — Courthouse and Post Office, Hartford, Connecticut
- 1887 – Major General John A. Logan Mausoleum, U.S. Soldiers' and Airmen's Home National Cemetery, Washington, D.C.
- 1887 — Sun Building, Washington, D.C., for the publisher of The Baltimore Sun newspaper; it is one of the oldest multistory steel-frame buildings in Washington, D.C.
- 1889 — Mullett Rowhouses, Washington, D.C.
- 1890 — Camp House mansion, Knoxville, Tennessee

== Gallery of designs ==
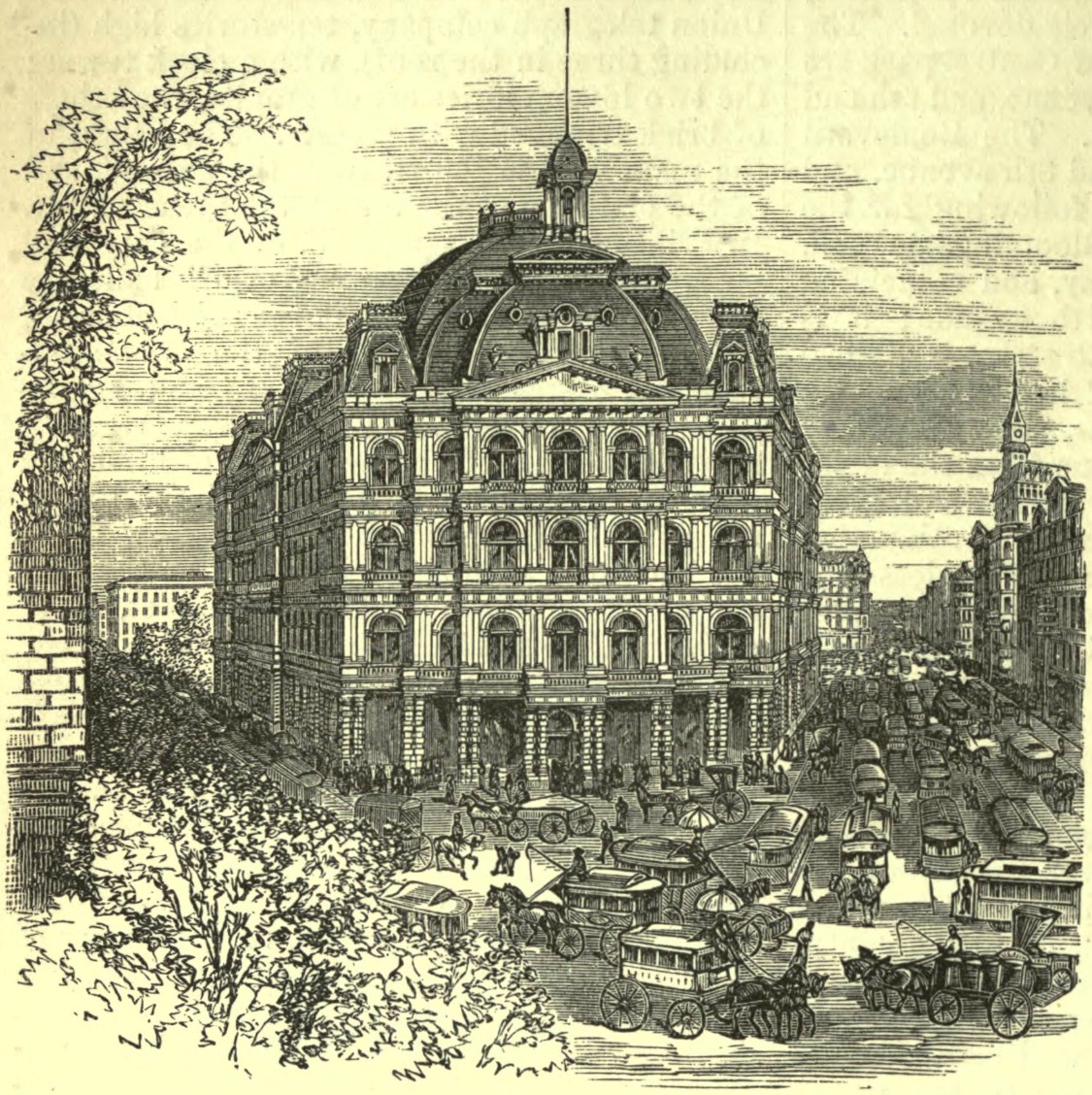
City Hall Post Office and Courthouse, Broadway, Manhattan, NY

Preceded by Isaiah Rogers	Office of the Supervising Architect; 1866–1874	Succeeded by William Appleton Potter
