= Eisenhower Executive Office Building =

U.S. historic place and government building

- State, War, and Navy Building
- U.S. National Register of Historic Places
- U.S. National Historic Landmark
- D.C. Inventory of Historic Sites
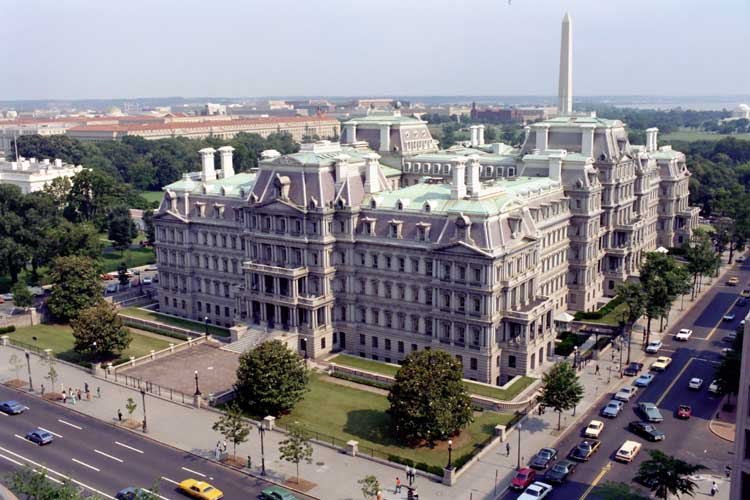
- Eisenhower Executive Office Building in 1981

- Location within Central Washington, D.C.
- Location: 1650 17th Street, NW, Washington, D.C., 20006, United States
- Coordinates: 38°53′51.24″N 77°2′20.93″W
- Built: 1871–1888; 138 years ago
- Architect: Alfred B. Mullett
- Architectural style: French Second Empire
- NRHP reference No.: 69000293
- DCIHS No.: 571

Significant dates
- Added to NRHP: June 4, 1969; 57 years ago
- Designated NHL: November 11, 1971; 54 years ago
- Designated DCIHS: November 8, 1964

The Eisenhower Executive Office Building (EEOB), formerly known as the Old Executive Office Building (OEOB), and originally known as the State, War, and Navy Building (SWAN Building), is a United States government building that is now part of the White House compound in the U.S. capital of Washington, D.C. The building houses various agencies that comprise the Executive Office of the President, such as the White House Office, the Office of the Vice President, the Office of Management and Budget, and the National Security Council. Opened in 1888, the building was renamed in 1999 in honor of Dwight D. Eisenhower, the 34th U.S. president and a five-star U.S. Army general who was an Allied forces commander during World War II.

The building is located on 17th Street NW, between Pennsylvania Avenue and State Place and West Executive Drive. It was commissioned by President Ulysses S. Grant, and built between 1871 and 1888 on the site of the original 1800 War/State/Navy Building and the White House stables, in the French Second Empire style.

As its original name suggests, it was initially built to house the staff of three government cabinet departments. The building's elaborate architectural style received substantial criticism when it was first completed; it has since been designated as a National Historic Landmark.

== History ==
The first executive offices were constructed between 1799 and 1820 on the former site of the Washington Jockey Club, flanking the White House. In 1869, following the Civil War, Congress appointed a commission to select a site and submit plan and cost estimates for a new State Department Building, with possible arrangements to house the War and Navy departments.

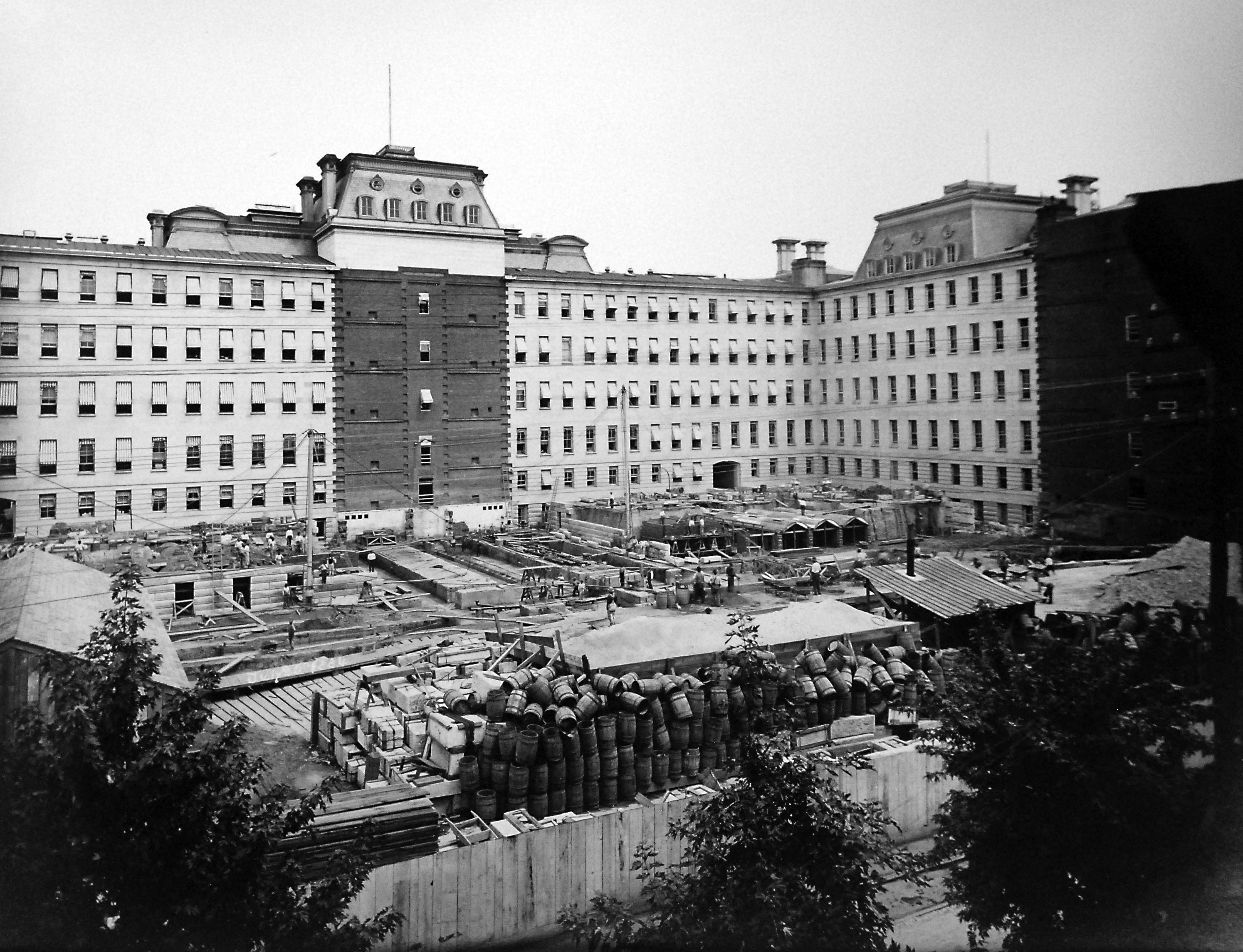
Construction of the building (undated), now the EEOB

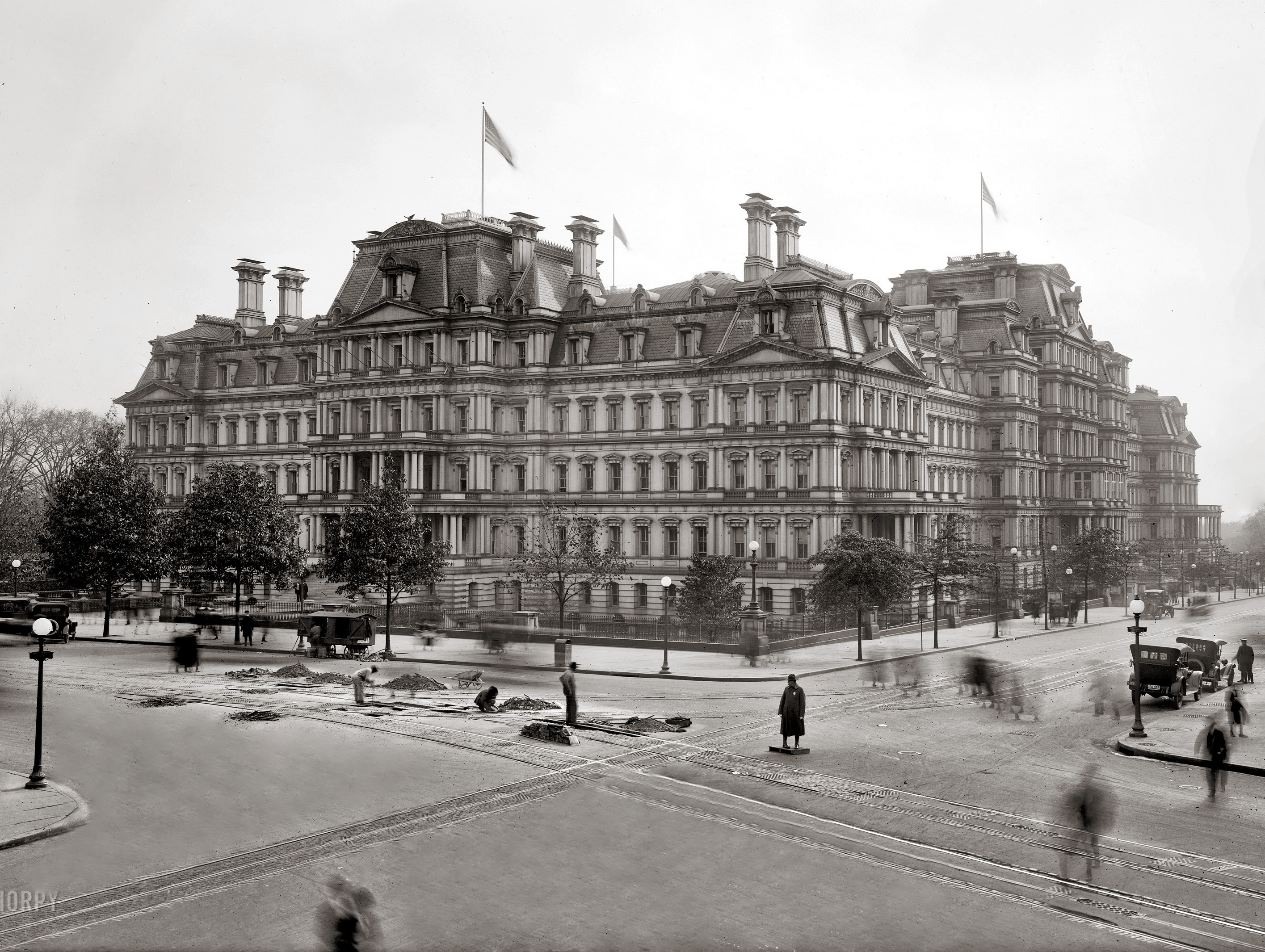
The (second) State, War, and Navy Building in 1917

The building, originally called the State, War, and Navy (SWAN) Building because it housed these three departments, was built between 1871 and 1888 in the French Second Empire style.

It was designed by Alfred B. Mullett, Supervising Architect of the Department of Treasury, which had responsibility for federal buildings. Patterned after French Second Empire architecture that clashed sharply with the neoclassical style of the other Federal buildings in the city, it was generally regarded with scorn and disdain. President Harry S. Truman called it "the greatest monstrosity in America." Historian Henry Adams called it Mullett's "architectural infant asylum." Mullett later resigned. Beset by financial difficulties, litigation, and illness, in 1890 he died by suicide.

The exterior granite was cut and polished on the island of Vinalhaven, Maine, under a contract with Bodwell Granite Company. Much of the interior was designed by Richard von Ezdorf, using fireproof cast-iron structural and decorative elements. These included massive skylights above each of the major stairwells, and doorknobs with cast patterns indicating which of the original three occupying departments (State, Navy, or War) occupied a particular space. The total cost to construct the building was $10,038,482 when construction ended in 1888 ($358 million in 2025), after 17 years.

The original tenants quickly outgrew the building, and finally vacated it completely in the late 1930s. Becoming known as the Old Executive Office Building, it housed staff members of the Executive Office of the President. The building was considered inefficient and was nearly demolished in 1957. In 1969, the building was designated as a National Historic Landmark.

In 1981, plans began to restore all the "secretary of" suites. The main office of the Secretary of the Navy was restored in 1987 and is now used as the ceremonial office of the vice president. Shortly after the September 11 attacks, the 17th Street side of the building was vacated and has since been modernized. The building continues to house various agencies that compose the president's executive office, such as the Office of the Vice President, the Office of Management and Budget, and the National Security Council. Its most public function is that of the Vice President's Ceremonial Office, which is used chiefly for special meetings and press conferences.

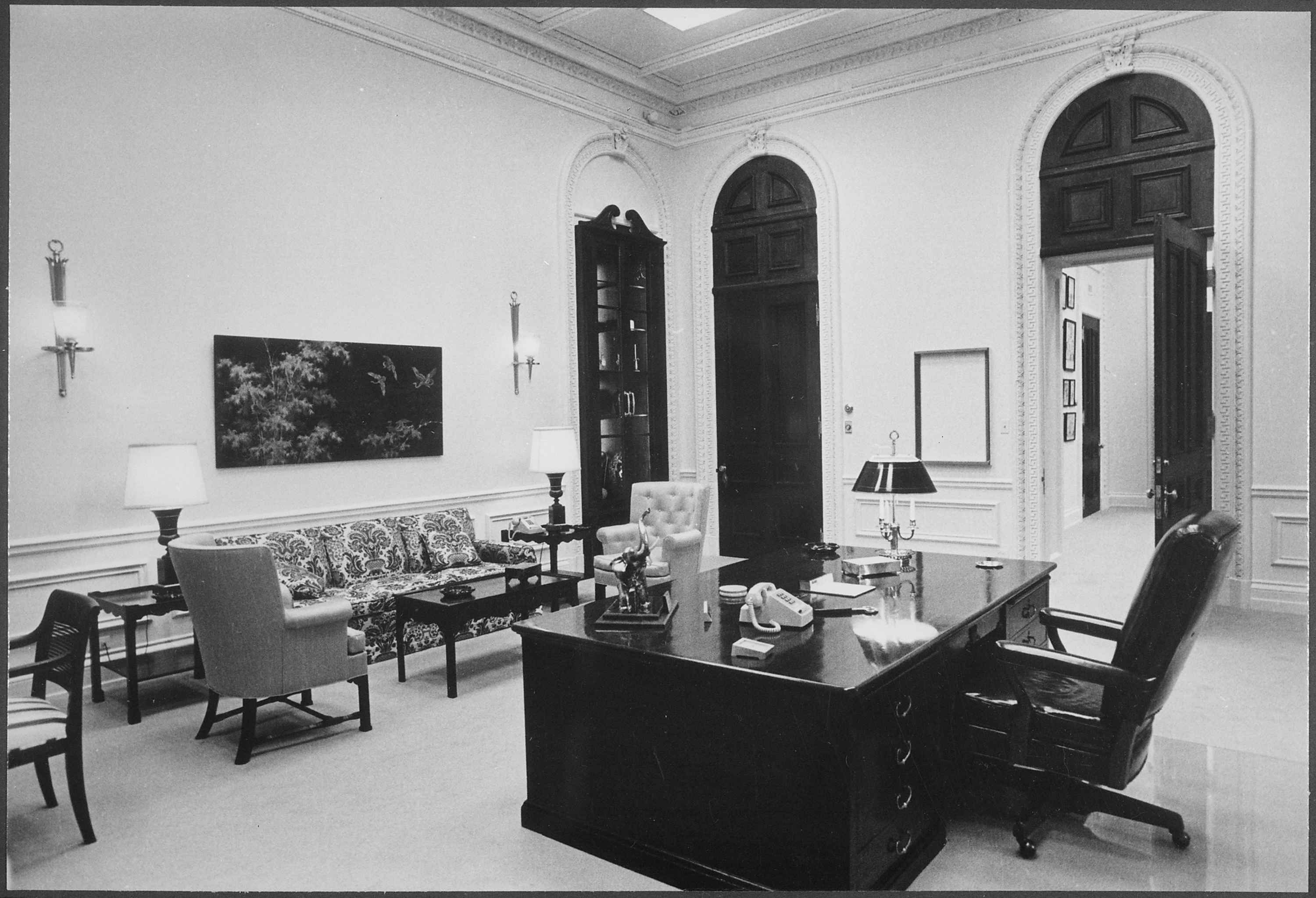
President Richard Nixon maintained a "hideaway" office in Room 180 of the EEOB, pictured here in 1969.

Many celebrated national figures have participated in historical events that have taken place within the Old Executive Office Building. Presidents Theodore Roosevelt, William Howard Taft, Franklin D. Roosevelt, Dwight D. Eisenhower, Lyndon B. Johnson, Gerald Ford, and George H. W. Bush all had offices in this building before becoming president. It has housed 16 secretaries of the Navy, 21 secretaries of war, and 24 secretaries of state. Sir Winston Churchill once walked its corridors and Japanese emissaries met there with Secretary of State Cordell Hull after the bombing of Pearl Harbor.

Presidents have occupied space in the EEOB as well. Herbert Hoover worked out of the Secretary of the Navy's office for a few months following a fire in the Oval Office on Christmas Eve 1929. President Dwight D. Eisenhower held the first televised presidential news conference in the building's Indian Treaty Room (Room 474) on January 19, 1955. President Richard Nixon maintained a private "hideaway" office in room 180 of the EEOB during his presidency, from where he preferred to work, using the Oval Office only for ceremonial occasions.

Vice President Lyndon B. Johnson was the first in a succession of vice presidents who have had offices in the building. The first wife of a vice president to have an office in the building was Marilyn Quayle, wife of Dan Quayle, vice president to George H.W. Bush.

The Old Executive Office Building was renamed the Dwight D. Eisenhower Executive Office Building when President Bill Clinton approved legislation changing the name on November 9, 1999. President George W. Bush participated in a rededication ceremony on May 7, 2002.

A small fire on December 19, 2007, damaged an office of the vice-president's staff and included the VP ceremonial office. According to media reporting, the office of the vice president's Political Director, Amy Whitelaw, was heavily damaged in the fire.

The building underwent major modernization from 2008-2014, updating all building systems while preserving historic character. The project earned a GSA Honor Award in 2014.

During the second Trump administration, the president showed a mock-up of the building painted white during a television interview. With a slate gray exterior, he considered the building ugly especially with its close proximity to the White House.

== Past occupants ==
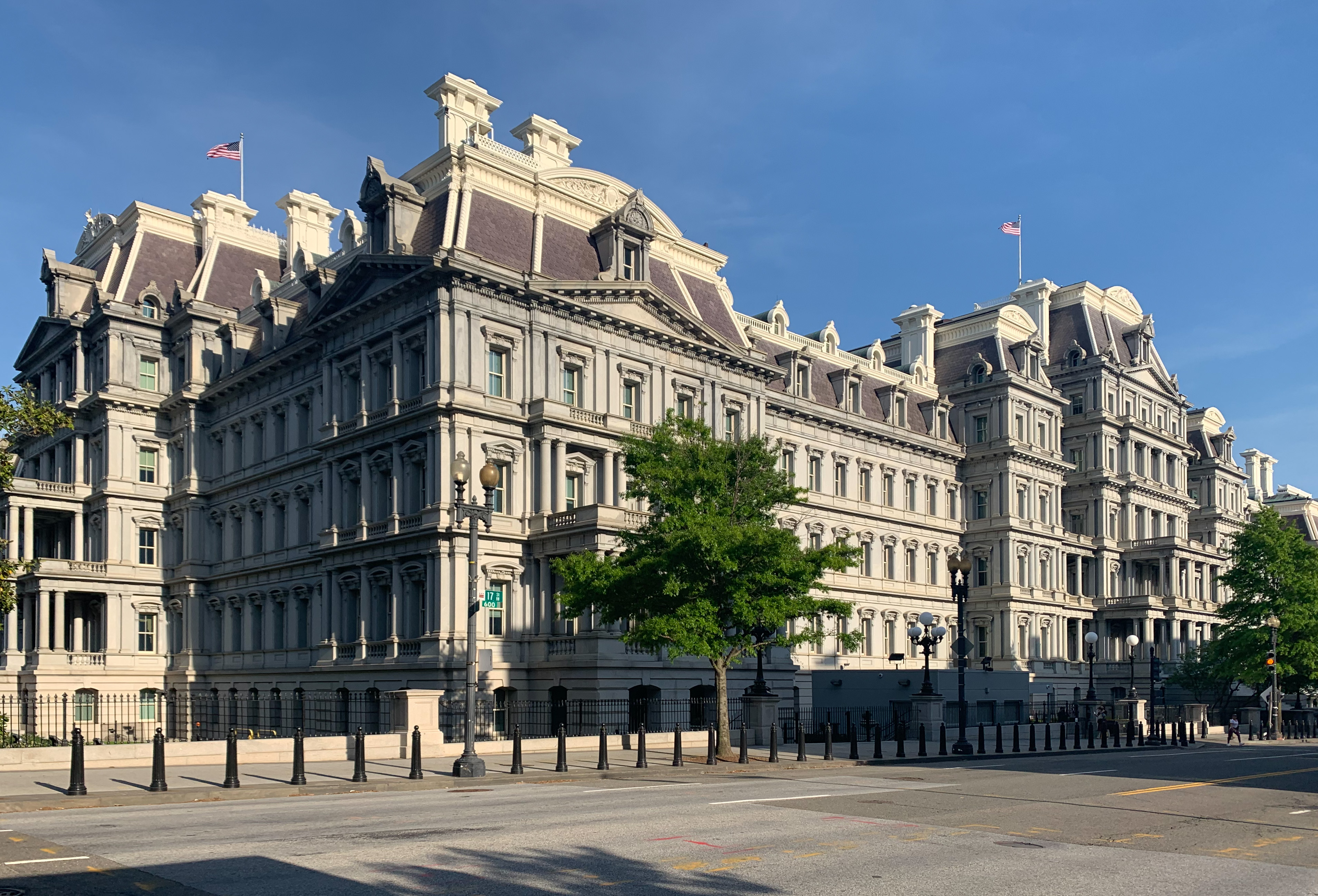
The EEOB from the intersection of Pennsylvania Ave and 17th St. NW, pictured in 2021

=== Presidents ===
- Theodore Roosevelt – while assistant secretary of the Navy
- William Howard Taft – while secretary of war
- Herbert Hoover – temporary offices after White House fire
- Franklin D. Roosevelt – while assistant secretary of the Navy
- Harry S. Truman – offices during reconstruction of the White House
- Dwight D. Eisenhower – while assigned to the Army General Staff
- Lyndon B. Johnson – while vice president
- Richard Nixon – had "hideaway" office
- Gerald Ford – while vice president
- George H. W. Bush – while vice president
- Joe Biden – while vice president

=== Vice presidents ===
- Hubert Humphrey
- Spiro Agnew
- Nelson Rockefeller
- Walter Mondale
- Dan Quayle
- Al Gore
- Dick Cheney
- Mike Pence
- Kamala Harris
- JD Vance

=== Secretaries of state ===
- John Hay
- Elihu Root
- William Jennings Bryan
- Cordell Hull

=== Secretaries of defense ===
- Henry L. Stimson
- Russell A. Alger
- Newton D. Baker
- Patrick J. Hurley

=== Army chiefs of staff ===
- John Schofield
- Nelson A. Miles
- John J. Pershing
- John L. Hines
- Charles Pelot Summerall
- Tasker H. Bliss
- Peyton C. March
- Douglas MacArthur
- Malin Craig
- George Marshall

=== Secretaries of the Navy ===
- John Davis Long
- Josephus Daniels
- Charles Joseph Bonaparte
- Charles Francis Adams III
- Frank Knox

=== Senior Navy officers ===
- George Dewey
- William S. Benson
- William Sims
- Ernest King
- William D. Leahy
- Harold Rainsford Stark
- Robert Coontz

== Gallery ==
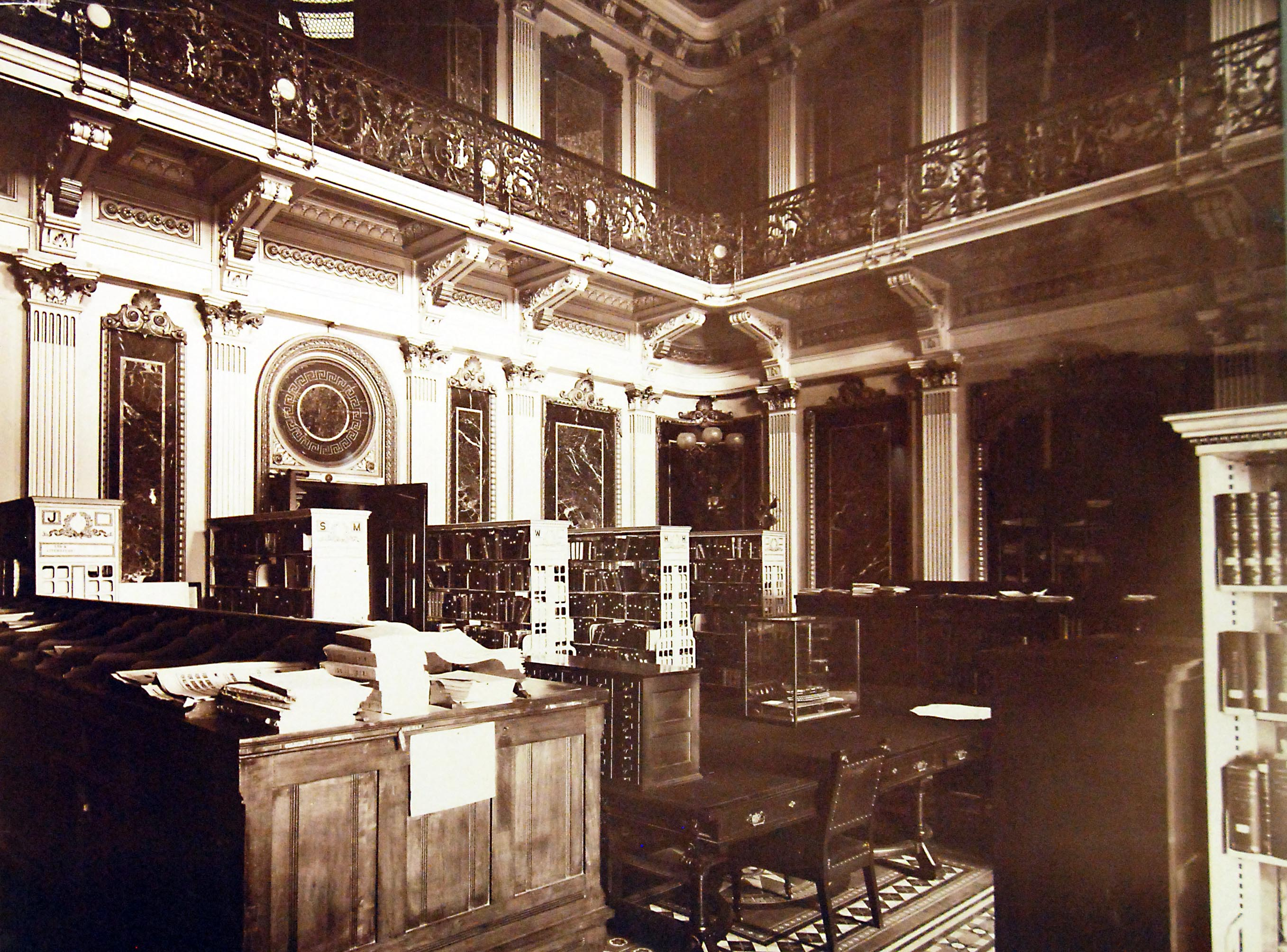
The Navy Department Library, 1915

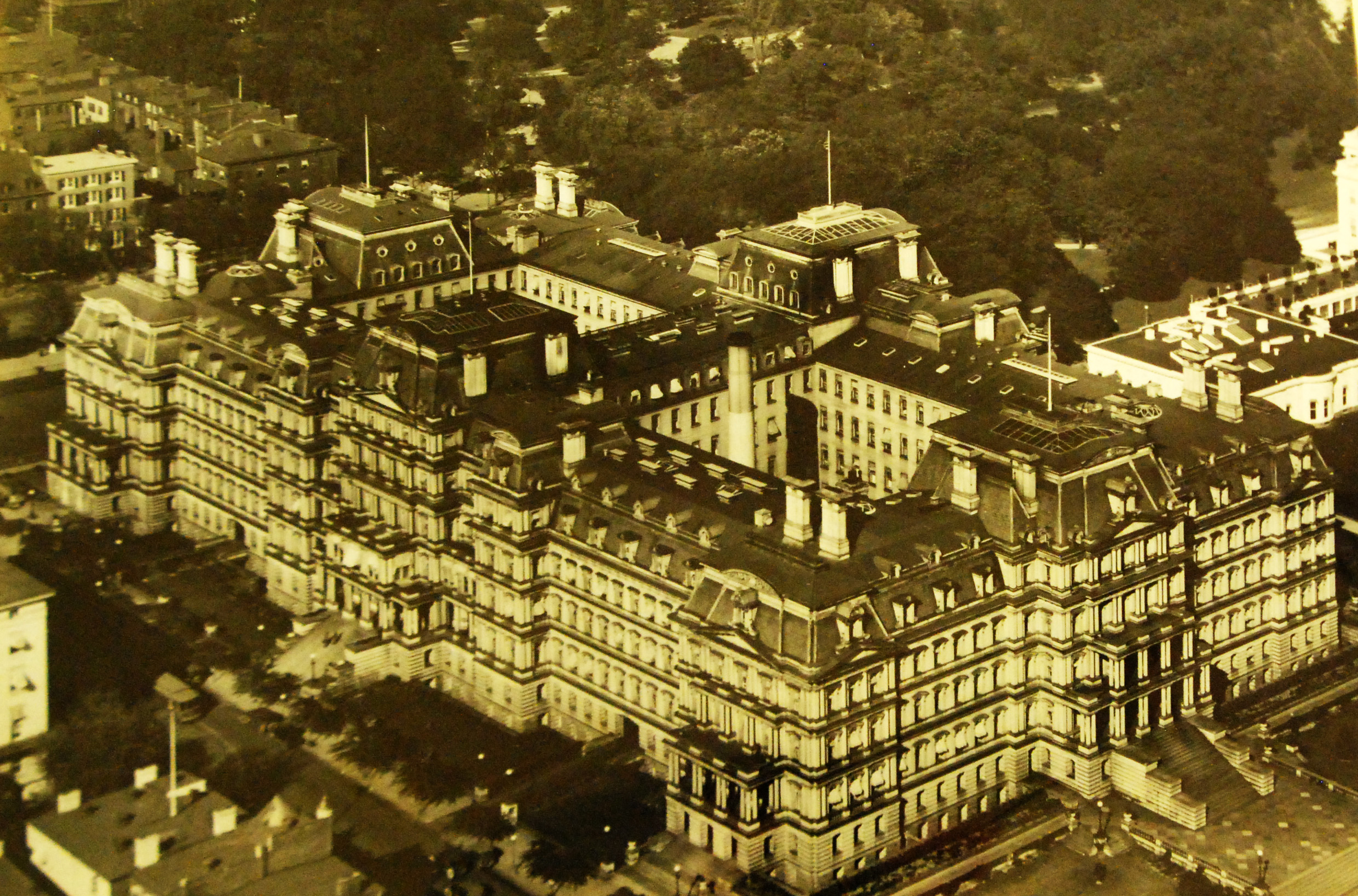
An overhead view looking northeast, c. 1920

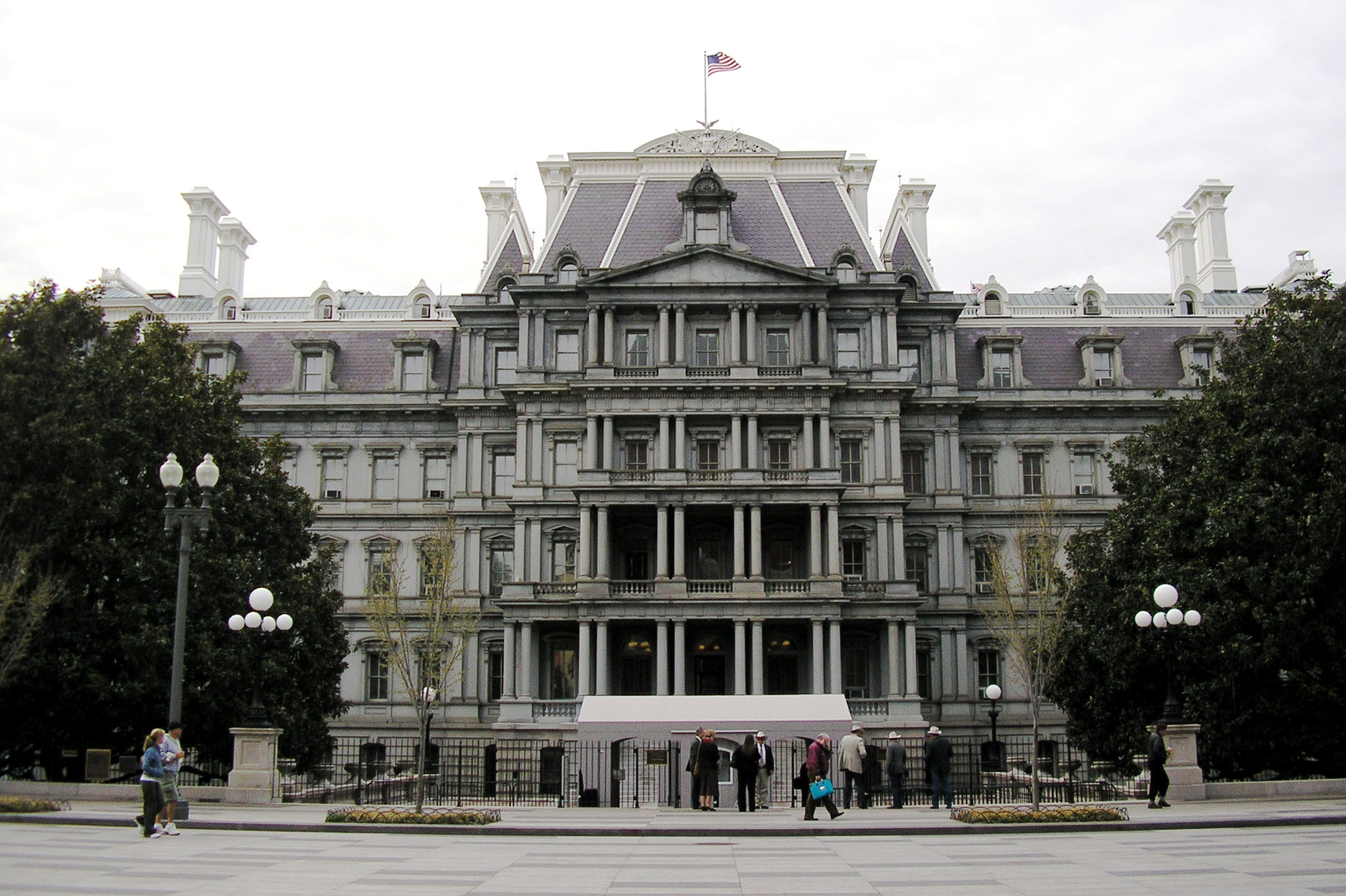
The Eisenhower Executive Office Building north façade

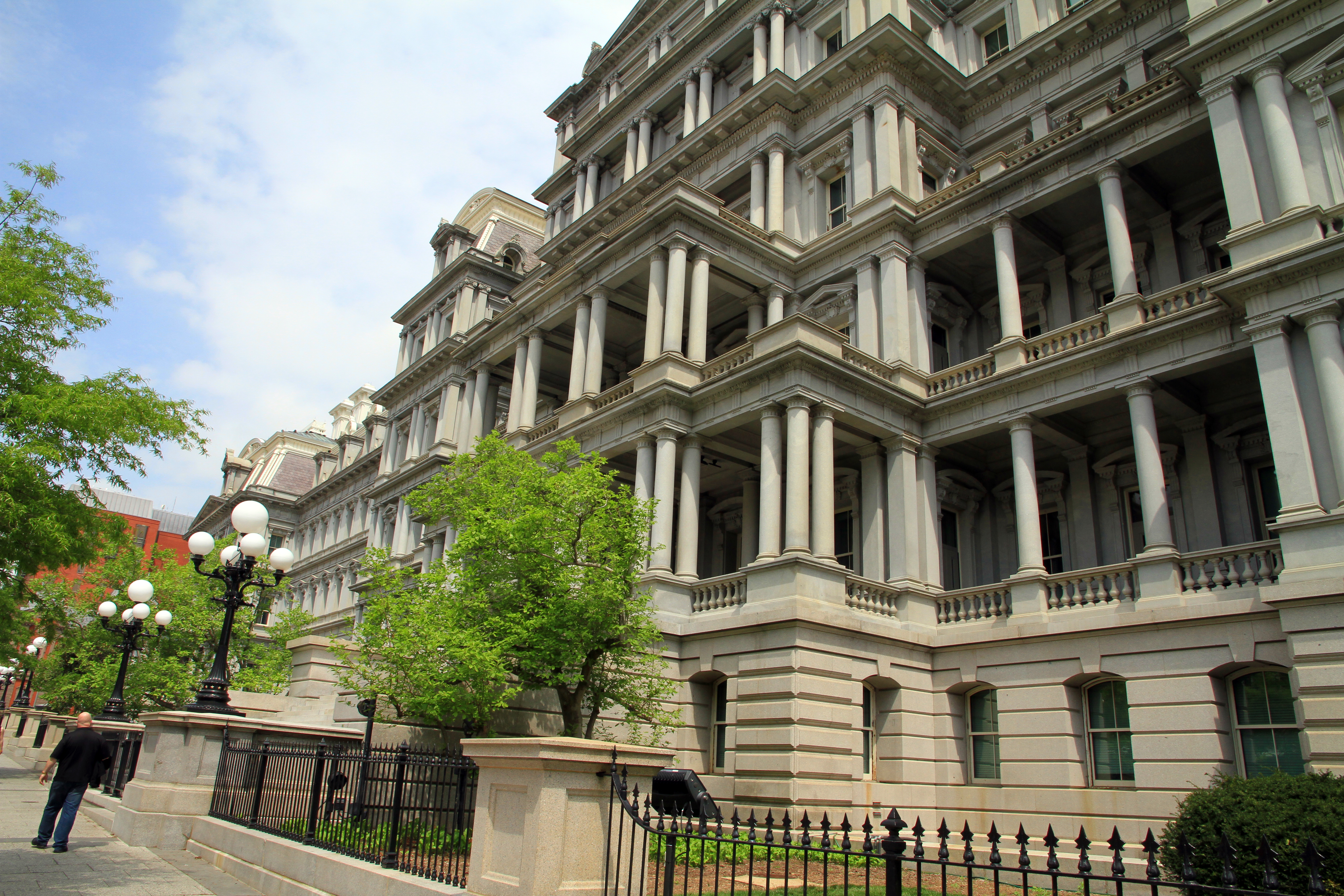
Executive Office Building façade detail

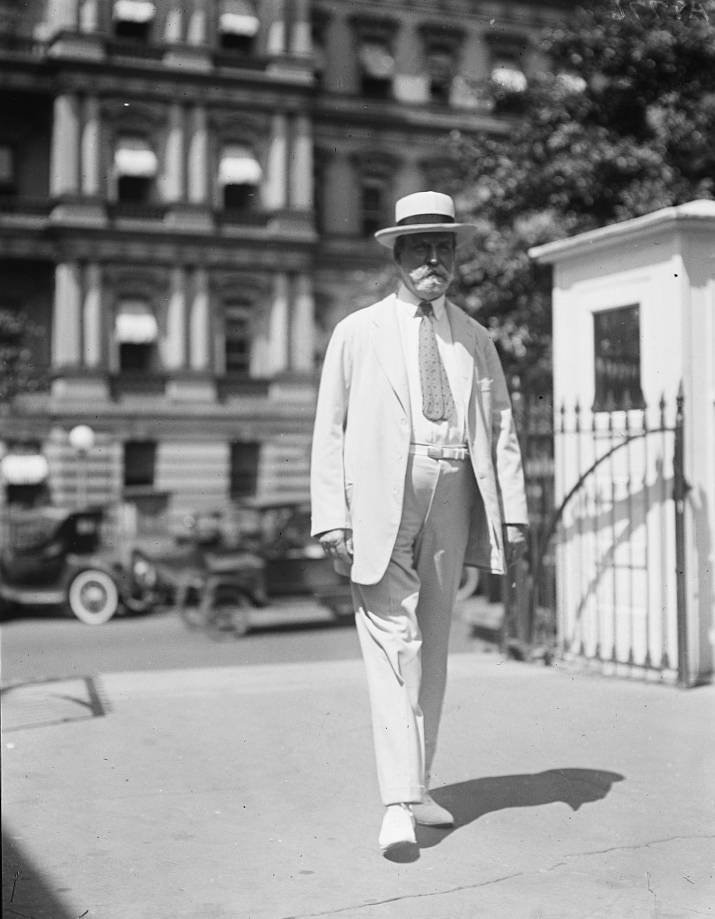
Charles Evans Hughes with the EEOB in the background

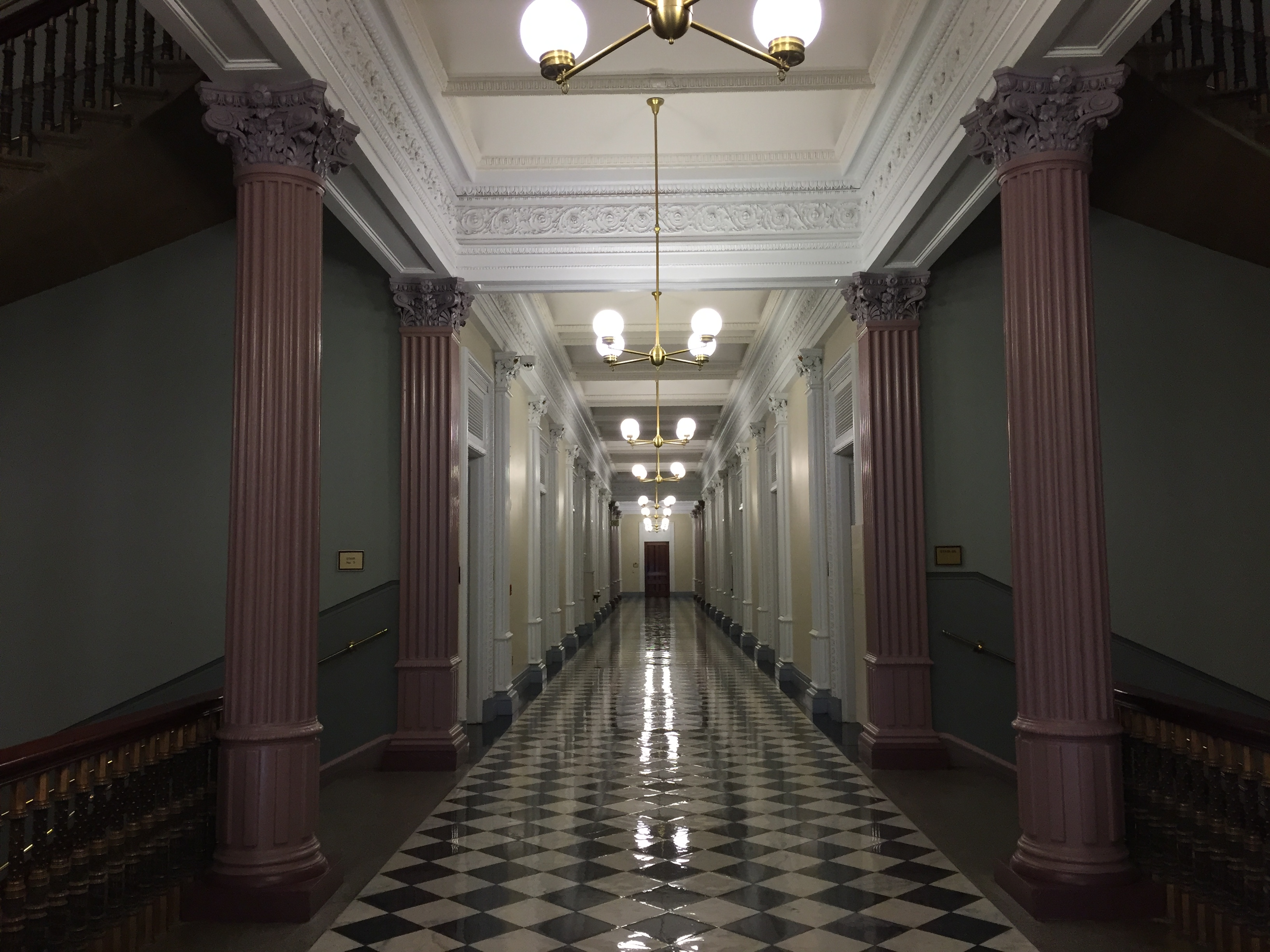
A hallway with decorative elements

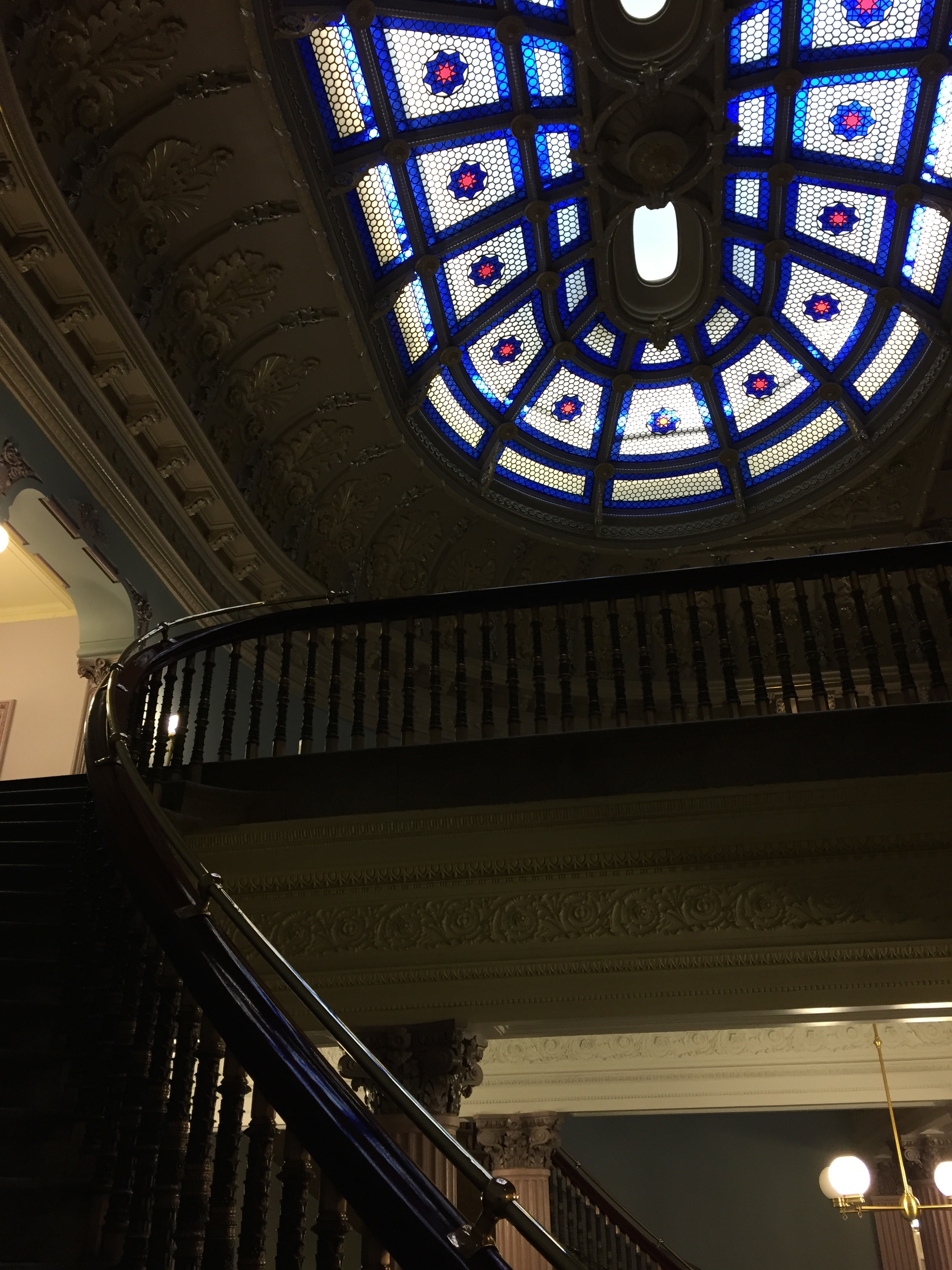
A skylight above a staircase

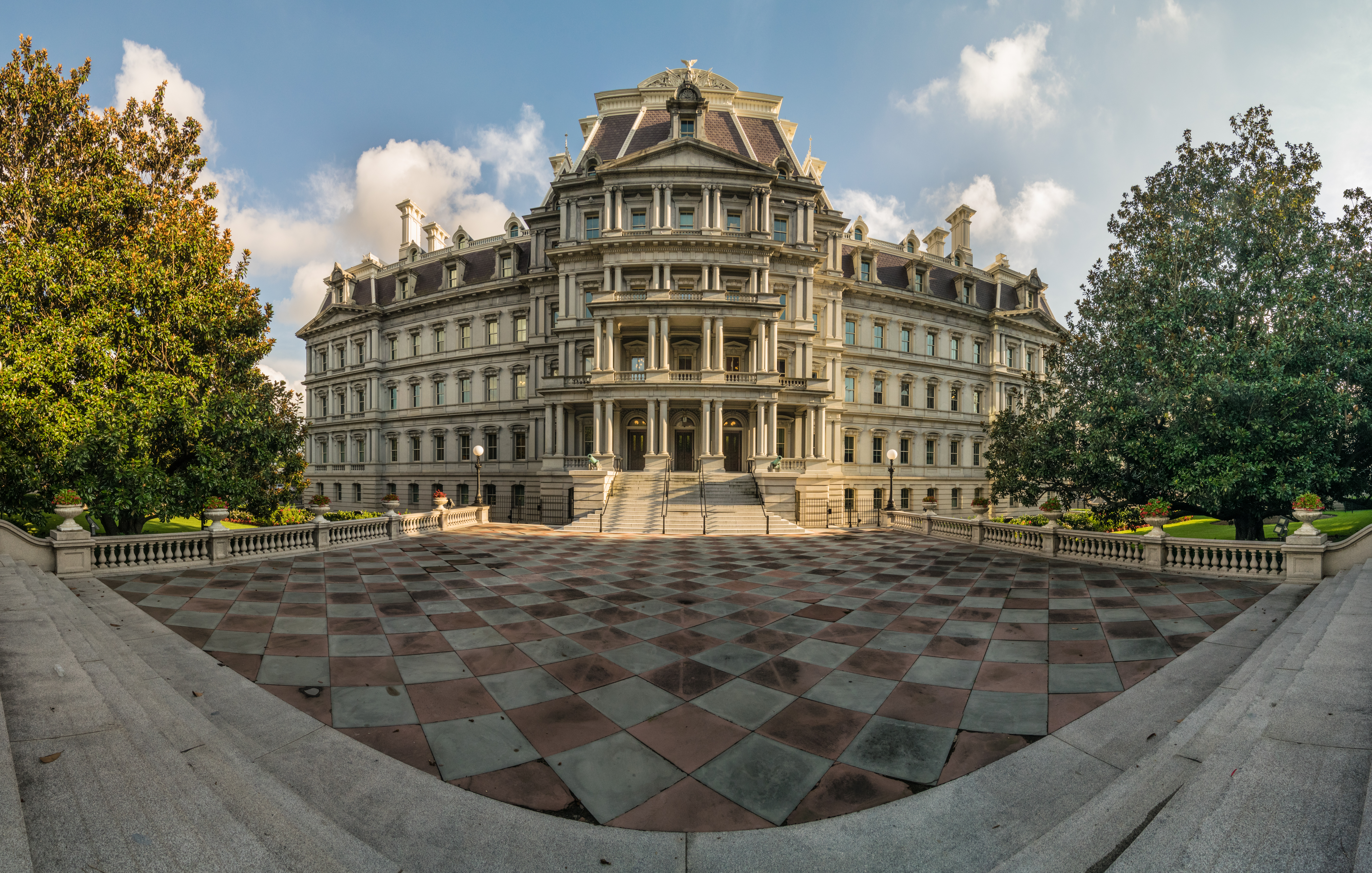
A fisheye view of the façade, 2017

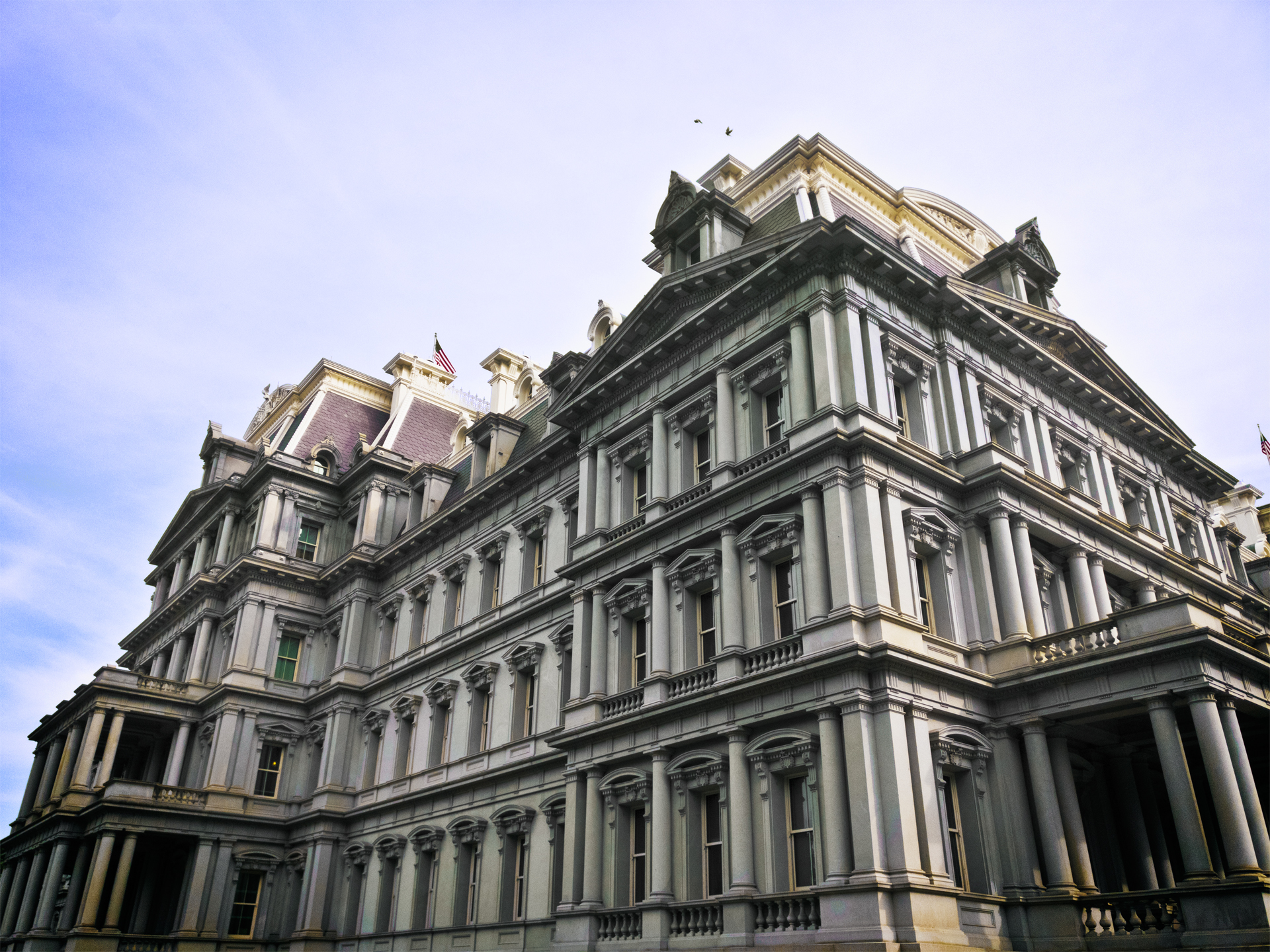
Detail of the northwest corner

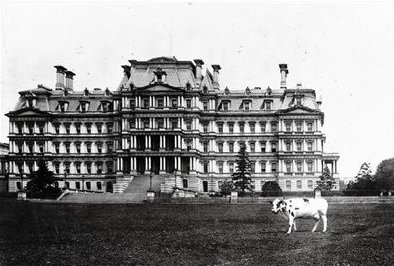
Pauline Wayne, President Taft's pet cow in front of the building

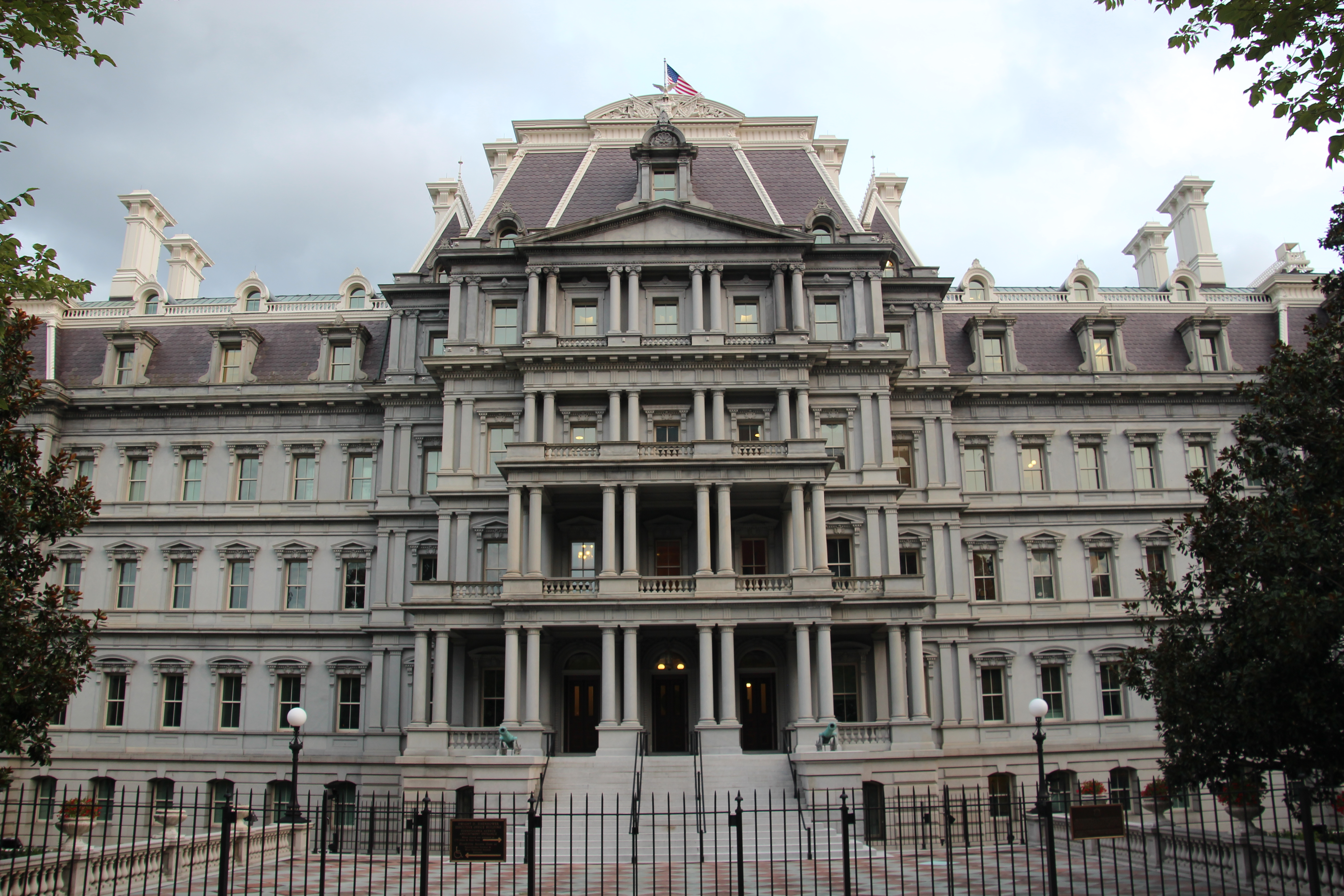
The front façade on Pennsylvania Avenue, 2018

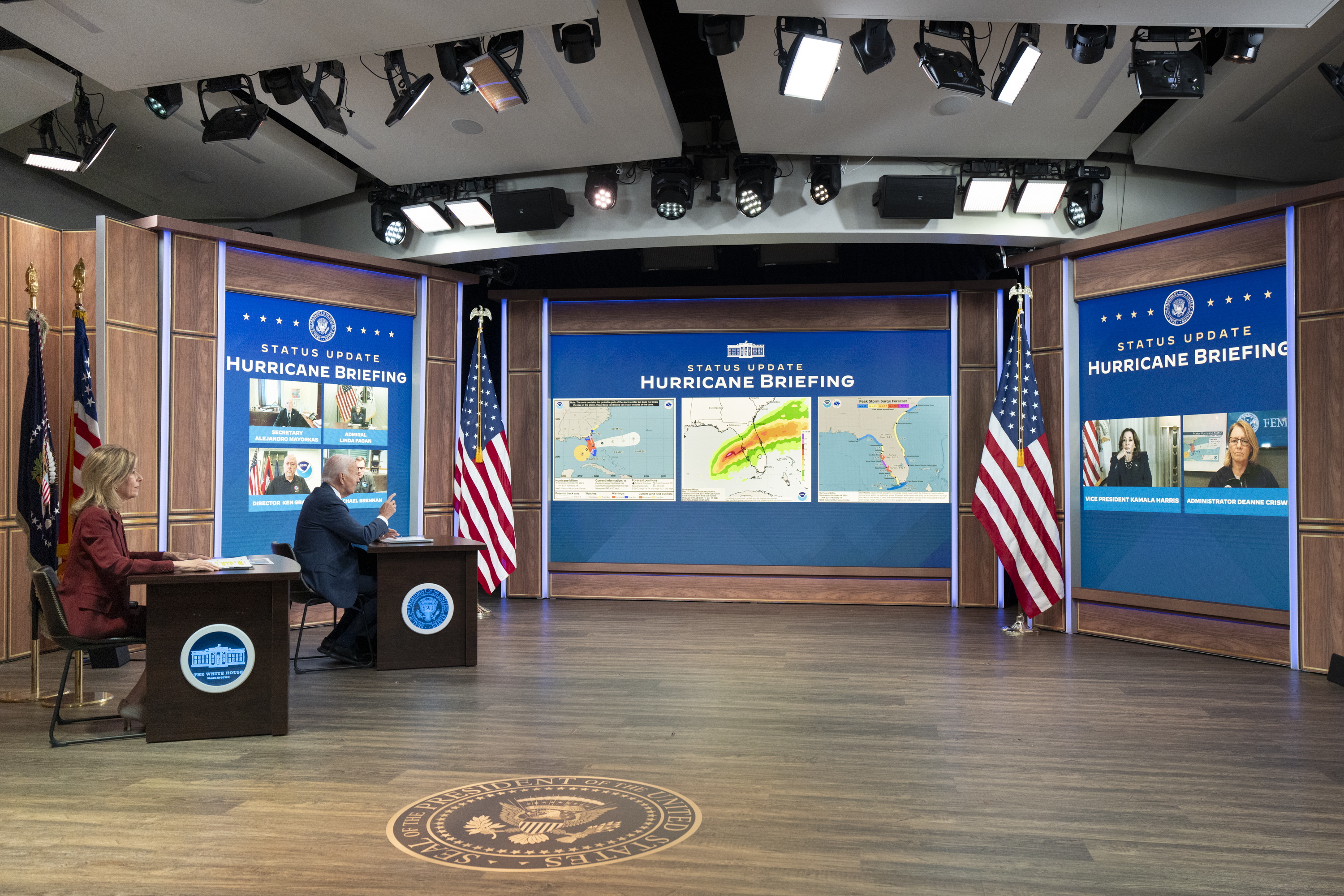
The South Court Auditorium, which has been used for policy announcements or briefings

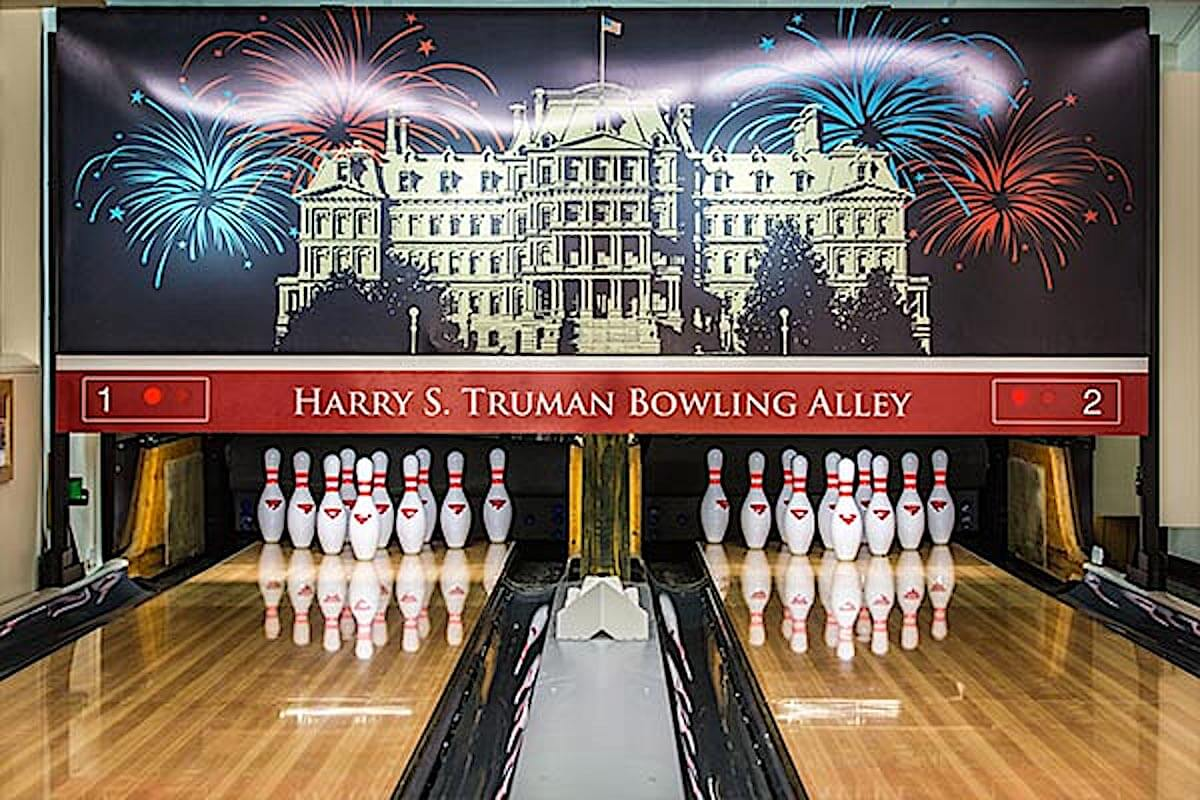
The two ten-pin bowling lanes of the Truman Bowling Alley

== See also ==
- Architecture of Washington, D.C.
- Treasury Building (Washington, D.C.)
