= Architecture of San Antonio =

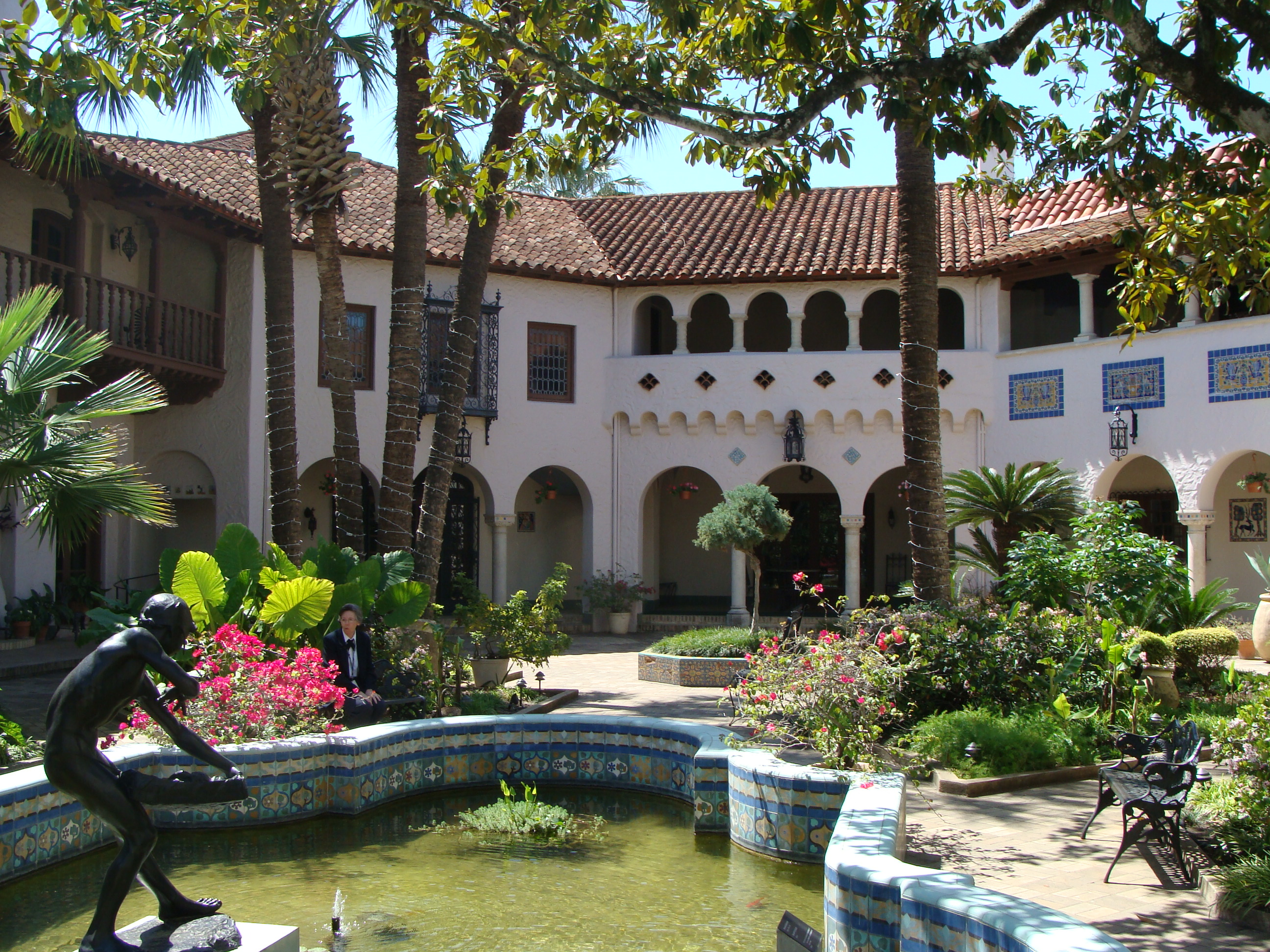
McNay Art Museum contains elements of traditional and modern architecture in San Antonio

Architecture in the American city of San Antonio, Texas comes from a wide variety of sources, but many of the city's buildings mostly reflect Texas' Spanish and Mexican roots; with some influence from French builders, among others. Relatively rapid economic growth since the mid twentieth century has led to a fairly wide variety of contemporary architectural buildings.

== Traditional architecture ==
The first European buildings in Texas were a series of religious Spanish Missions built by Catholic Dominicans, Jesuits, and Franciscans to spread the Christian doctrine among the local Native Americans, and to give Spain a toehold in the frontier land. The missions introduced European livestock, fruits, vegetables, and industry into the Texas region. In addition to the presidio (fort) and pueblo (town), the misión was one of the three major agencies employed by the Spanish crown to extend its borders and consolidate its colonial territories. In all, twenty-six missions were maintained for different lengths of time within the future boundaries of the state. The San Antonio de Valero Mission known for the Battle of the Alamo is a prime example of this kind of architecture in San Antonio. Among other examples are:

- Mission San Juan Capistrano
- Mission San Francisco de la Espada
- Mission San José
- Mission Concepcion
- Espada Acequia

Among other notable buildings of historical, architectural, and religious significance are the Basilica of the National Shrine of the Little Flower and Cathedral of San Fernando, both still in use. While most of these were influenced by Spanish and Mexican styles of design, some buildings display other origins. Francois Guilbeau's House, for example, was built in 1847 by Jules Poinsard, and harbors 19th century French Neo-classic elements, while Hipolito F. Garcia Federal Building and United States Courthouse (1937) is of a Beaux-Arts design, and yet Koehler Cultural Center (1901) carries prominent influences of Victorian and eclectic designs.

Bexar County has a distinct courthouse in Downtown San Antonio. The Bexar County Courthouse, like many of the aforementioned buildings in the city, is a historical landmark and protected city’s Spanish heritage of San Antonio.

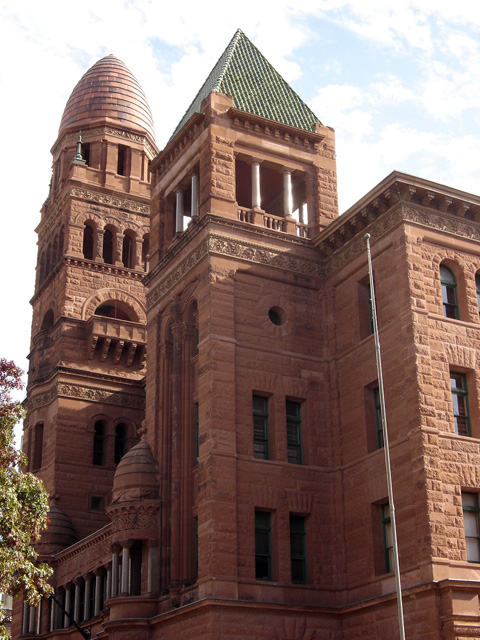
The Bexar County Courthouse by James Riely Gordon is a work of Romanesque Revival architecture from 1892.

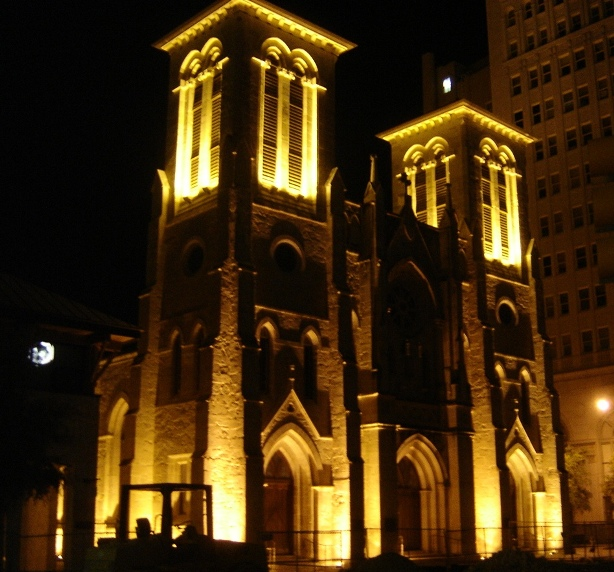
The Cathedral of San Fernando is one of the oldest operating cathedrals in the United States, dating back to 1731.

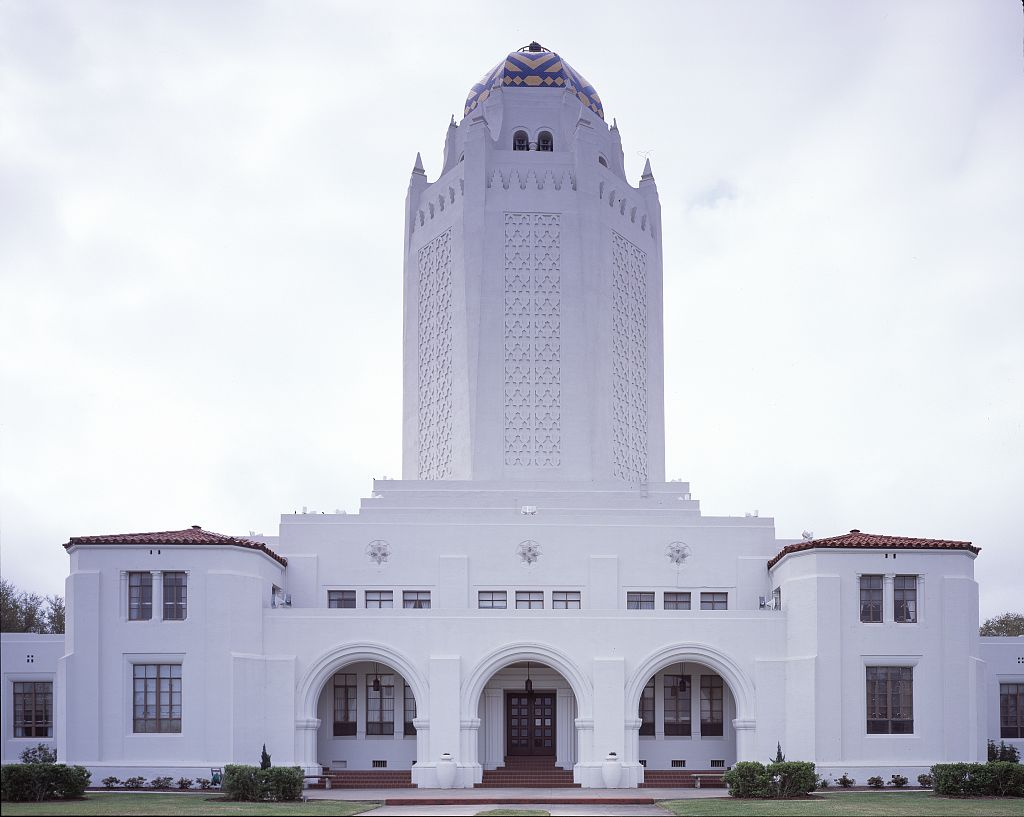
"The Taj Mahal" at Randolph Air Force Base, completed in 1931, is one of the US Air Force's most famous buildings.

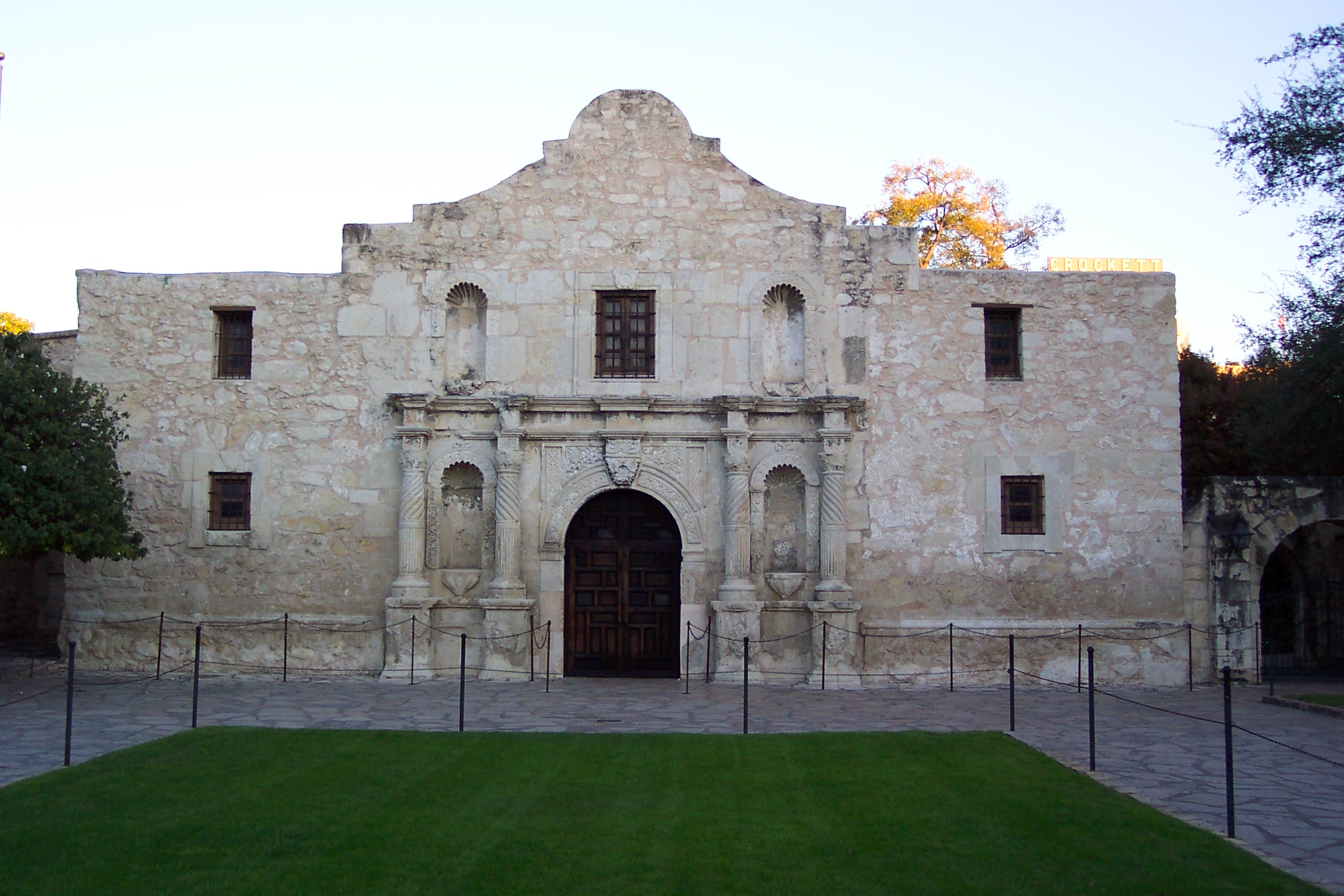
The Alamo. Because of such national icons, the city receives 26 million visitors per year.

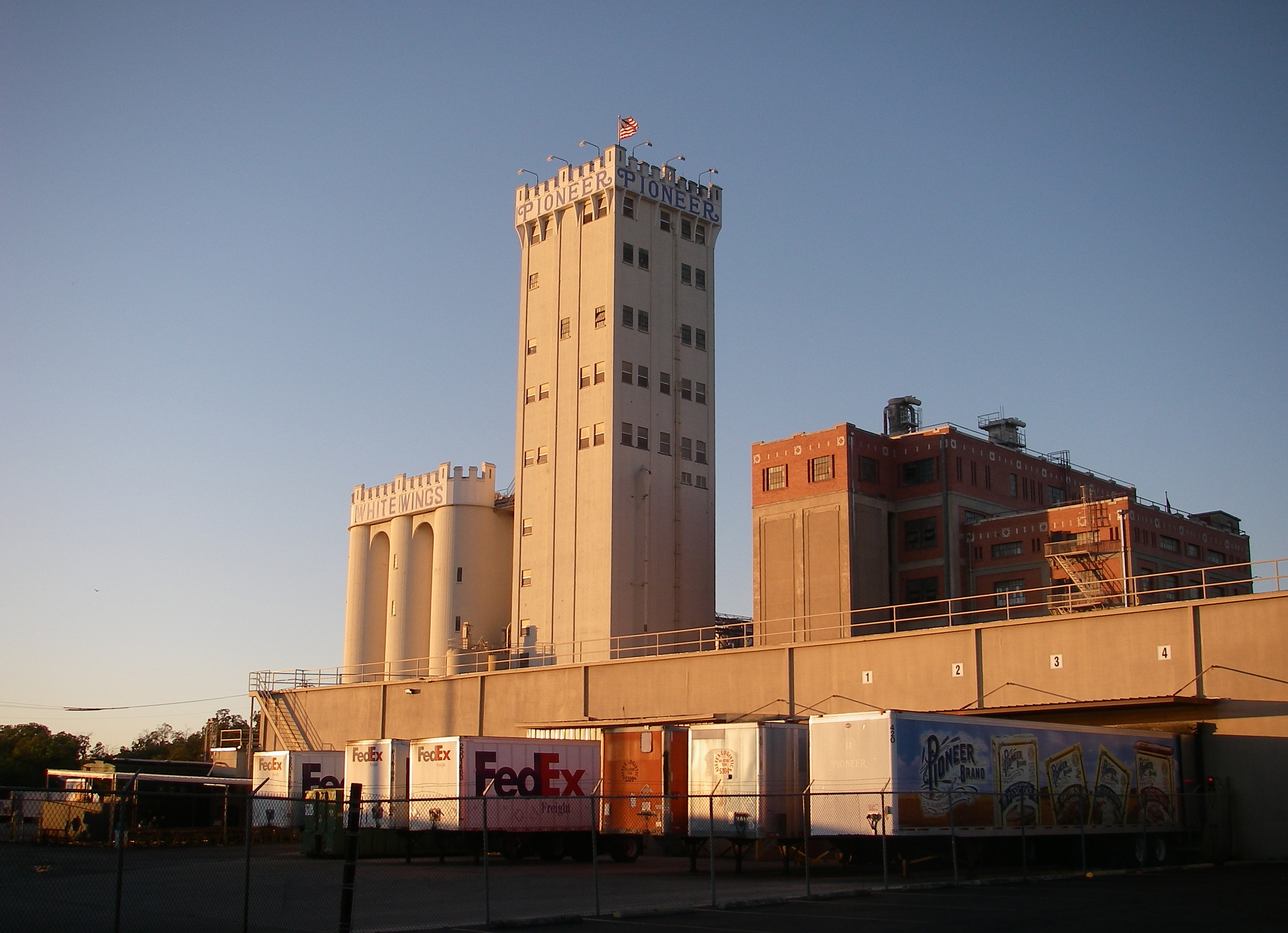
Guenther & Sons, Pioneer Brand flour mill and grain elevator

Among other older notable buildings in San Antonio are the Pearl Brewing Company, the Spanish Governor's Palace, The Majestic Theatre, the Spanish Colonial Revival Thomas Jefferson High School, and many houses to the immediate south of Downtown San Antonio, located in the King William Historic District, built by 19th century German industrialists.

=== 19th century vestiges of the tourism industry ===
Much of the architecture of Downtown San Antonio, both old and new, has traditionally revolved around the tourism attractions industry. Buildings like The Aztec Theatre, La Villita, Fairmont Hotel, and Menger Hotel are over a century old, and are still in use today.

San Antonio Walks - offers an Architecture Tour

== Contemporary architecture ==
In addition to the city's historic and recent traditional architecture, San Antonio also has some noteworthy contemporary buildings. Many world class architects have left their enriching marks on the landscape of the city. Some facilities harbor the marks of multiple architects. The San Antonio Museum of Art and The McNay Museum of Fine Arts are examples of aesthetic buildings where craftsmanship of the old and the new have merged into one. Some of the city's more prominent contemporary works have been summarized in the table below:

Building	Architect	year
Tower of the Americas	O'Neil Ford	1968
Trinity University campus	O'Neil Ford and Kell Munoz Architects	1960s
Northrup Hall, Trinity University	Robert A. M. Stern	2004
Oliver Wendell Holmes High School	Marmon Mok	1964
Lucile Halsell Conservatory, San Antonio Botanical Garden	Emilio Ambasz	1988
Administration building, UTHSCSA	HKS, Inc.	2004
South Texas Research Facility, UTHSCSA	Rafael Viñoly	2011
The Grand Hyatt of San Antonio	Arquitectonica	2008
McNay Museum of Art extension	Jean-Paul Viguier	2002
San Antonio Public Library	Ricardo Legorreta	1994
AT&T Center	Ellerbe Becket	2002
Medical Arts & Research Center, UTHSCSA	FKP Architects	2010
Alamodome	Populous (former HOK)	1993
Frost Tower	Cesar Pelli	2019
Ruby City	David Adjaye	2019

== Skyline ==
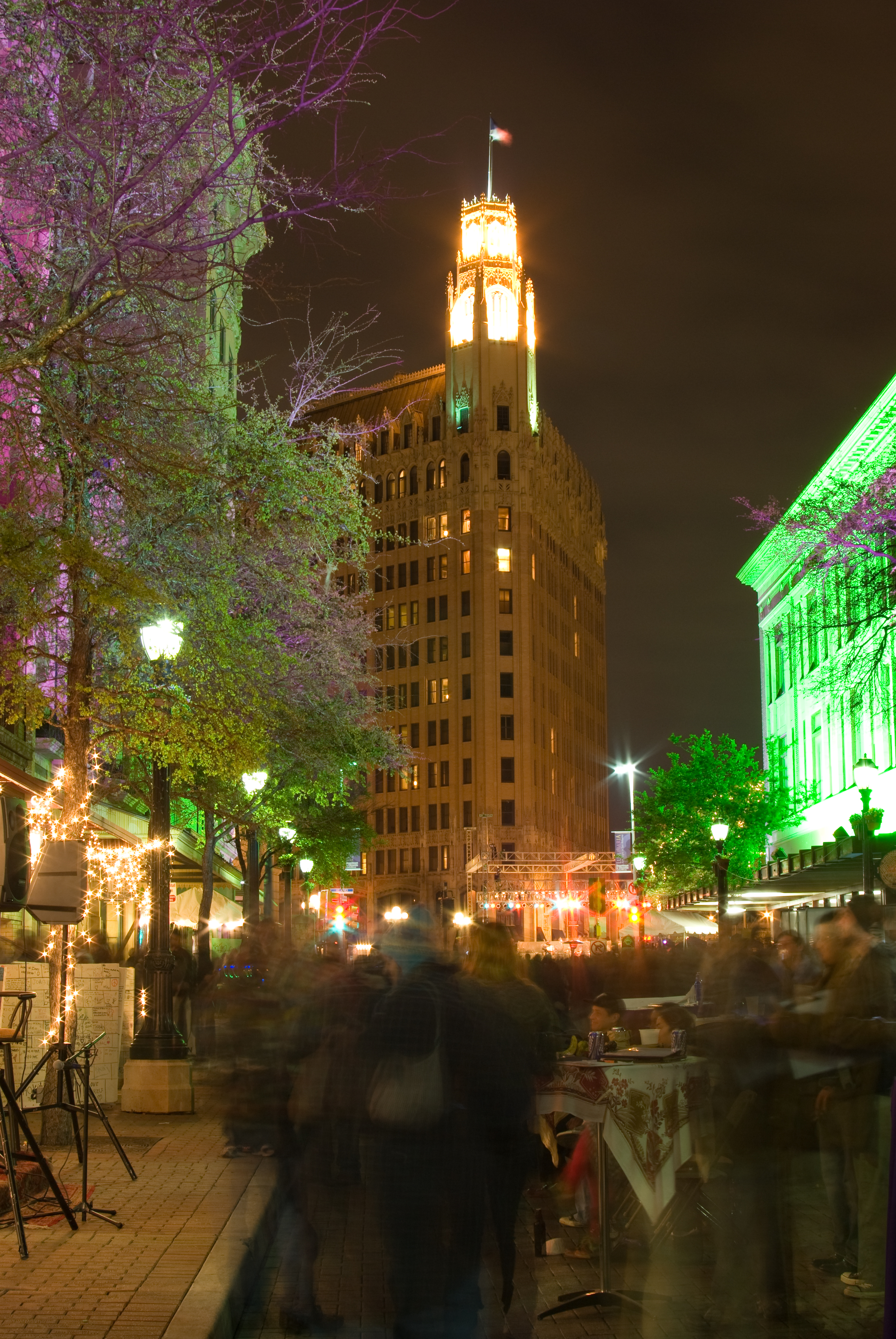
Seen here is The Emily Morgan Hotel (const. 1924). Many of San Antonio's oldest and tallest towers, are clustered around the popular "Houston Street".

While the skyline is not the tallest in Texas (Houston, Dallas and Austin are taller), Downtown San Antonio is a unique one with a mix of old and new styles of architecture.

Some buildings, such as the Emily Morgan Hotel, Gunter Hotel, the Nix Medical building, The AT&T Building (105 Auditorium Circle), Drury Hotel, and Tower Life Building date back to the early to mid twentieth century, and are considered national or state landmarks. These are "exceptional examples of NeoGothic Revival architecture, complete with carved faces (grotesques), gargoyles, and other carved stone embellishments".

Other buildings add a more modern tint to the city's skyline. Among these, the most prominent are the Tower of the Americas, The Weston Center, the Marriott Rivercenter, and the Grand Hyatt. Yet other buildings, such as The Vistana complex, offer a more modern Art Deco form of architecture to the city's image.

The most recent movement of new highrises and skyscrapers including The Arts Residences, The Canopy, and The Frost Tower offer a more Neo-Futuristic design.

== Education ==
The primary school for higher education in architecture is the University of Texas, San Antonio, at its Downtown Campus. However, Trinity University in Midtown San Antonio has a notable architectural campus.

== See also ==
- San Antonio River Walk
