= Texas Transportation Company =

Overview
- Headquarters: San Antonio, Texas
- Reporting mark: TXTC
- Locale: San Antonio, Texas, United States
- Dates of operation: 1897–2001

Technical
- Track gauge: 4 ft 8 1/2 in (1,435 mm) standard gauge
- Electrification: 600 V DC, overhead trolley wire

The Texas Transportation Company (reporting mark TXTC) was an electrified, Class III, short-line railroad in San Antonio, Texas, that operated from 1897 until 2001. It served the Pearl Brewery and several other businesses, moving carloads between those businesses and the Southern Pacific yard. Service ended on June 30, 2000, shortly before the Pabst Brewing Company closed the Pearl Brewery, in early 2001.

== History ==
The Texas Transportation Company was founded in 1887 as a private company. It was chartered on September 24, 1897. It served more than 20 customers at its peak, including the Lone Star Brewing Company and the Pearl Brewery. Gross annual operating revenue in 1956 was $80,000. It was designated a Common Carrier in 1932.

By 1990, the 1.1-mile (1.8 km) line was one of only three "trolley freight" railroads still in operation in the United States, along with Iowa Traction Railroad and the East Troy Electric Railroad, but by that time, the Pearl Brewery was its sole remaining regular customer. Another customer, Samuel's Glass Company, called on TXTC to move a load of finished plate glass from its spur on Newell Street only "once in a great while". The railroad was operating on Mondays to Fridays as of 1990, with runs taking place at 6 a.m., 10 a.m. and, if needed, 2 p.m. The line included street running along Jones Street.

== Locomotives ==
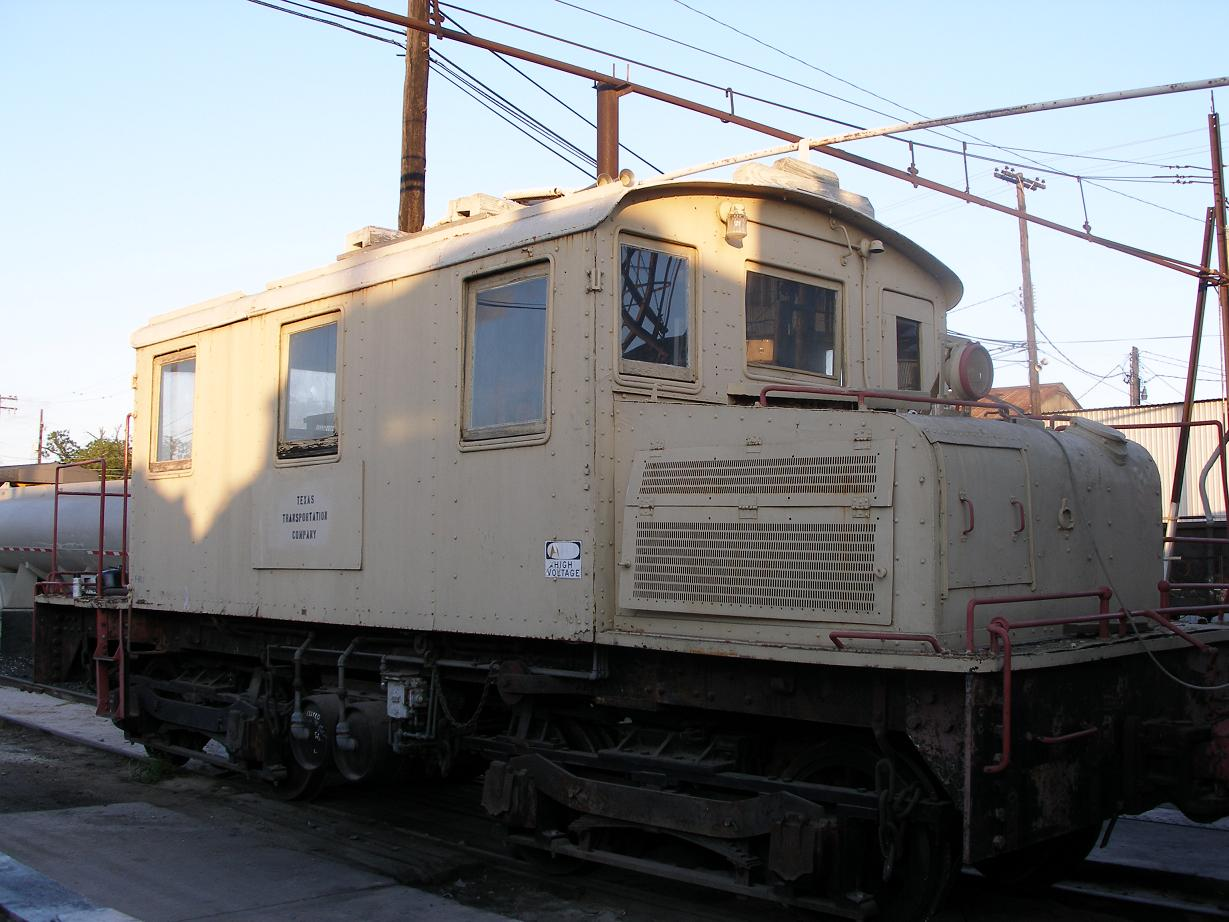
Engine #1 in July 2006

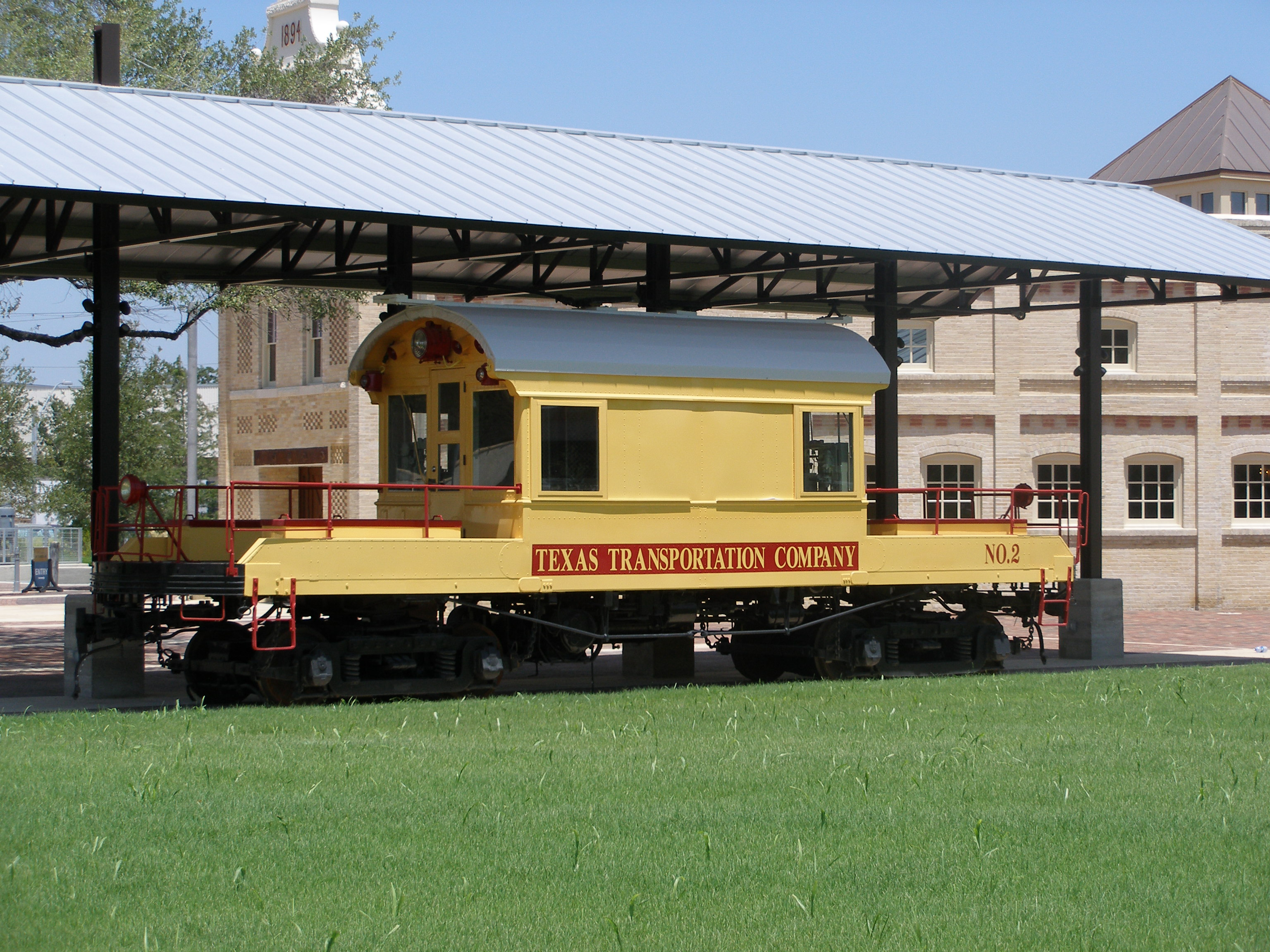
The second Engine #2, restored and on static display, in August 2006

The railroad's first two locomotives were boxcabs that were "probably" built by the St. Louis Car Company. They were numbered 1 and 2, but TXTC reused those numbers more than once for locomotives acquired later, including for rolling stock acquired secondhand from the San Antonio Public Service Company (streetcar system) and converted to haul freight cars.

The two locomotives in use in the railroad's final years were again numbered 1 and 2.

- No. 1 was a 60-ton short-nosed steeplecab engine built in 1917 by the Baldwin Locomotive Works and acquired secondhand by TXTC in 1954. It had previously been No. 504 of the Kansas City, Kaw Valley and Western Railway and, before that, Monongahela and West Penn Public Service Company No. 3002.
- No. 2 was built in 1907 by the St. Louis Car Company, and TXTC acquired it in 1949 from the Texas Electric Railway. It was originally Texas Traction Company interurban car 4, becoming Texas Electric's No. 351 in 1917 and being rebuilt by TE in 1929 into a 35-ton locomotive, numbered 952.

TXTC's No. 1 was overhauled in the 1960s, and as of 1990 it was the railroad's main locomotive, with No. 2 being "used only occasionally".

== Museum streetcar ==
From 1982 through 1985, a short section of TXTC track was used for a heritage streetcar service operated by the San Antonio Museum of Art. The service used original San Antonio streetcar No. 300, built in 1913 by the American Car Company and owned by the San Antonio Museums Association ever since the abandonment of the city's last streetcar lines in 1933. The new Art Museum was opened in 1981 in the former Lone Star Brewery complex, which had been one of TXTC's customers. The railroad's tracks still ran past the site, and the overhead trolley wires came close. In 1981–82, volunteers restored the streetcar, nicknamed "Old 300", to operating condition and reinstalled trolley wire on a TXTC spur behind the museum, unused since the 1950s. The city's former streetcar system had been 4 ft (1,219 mm) so car 300 had to be modified for TXTC's 4 ft 8 1/2 in (1,435 mm) standard gauge tracks; this was accomplished by refitting the car with modified ex-New Orleans trucks and using some parts from similar car 303.

The museum's short streetcar line began operating in October 1982. The car ran twice a day on Tuesdays through Fridays and six times a day on weekends, but budget cuts and high insurance costs led to the service's being discontinued at the end of 1985.

== See also ==
- Pearl Brewing Company
- Electric locomotive
- Texas Transportation Museum
- List of Texas railroads
