= Hotel Emma =

Hotel in San Antonio, Texas

Coordinates: 29°26′34″N 98°28′52″W

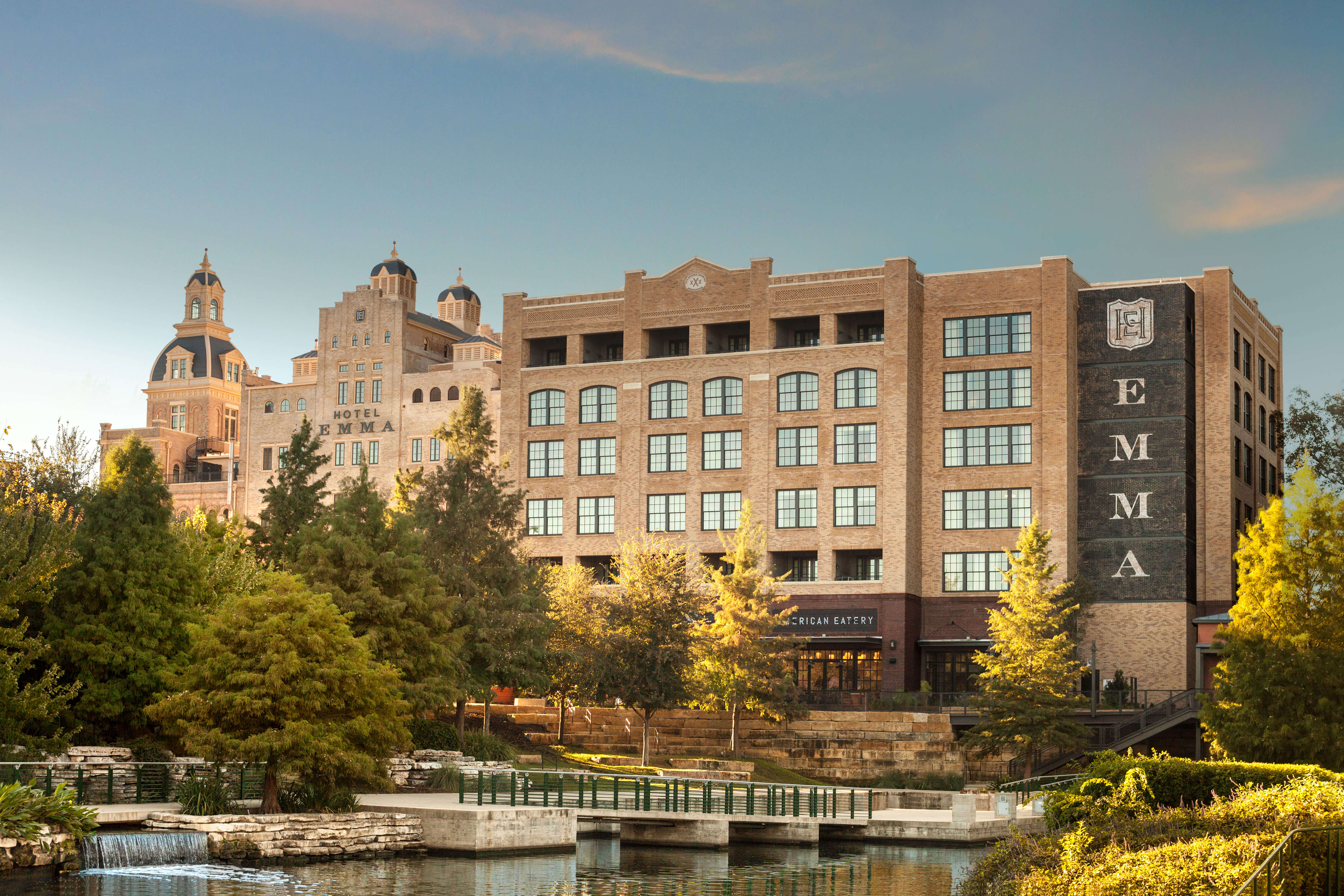
Hotel Emma exterior

Hotel Emma, once a 19th-century brewhouse, is a 146-room boutique hotel in the historic Pearl District of San Antonio, Texas, United States. It has a library, bar, club room, restaurant and grocer. Hotel Emma is named after Emma Koehler, wife of Pearl President Otto Koehler.

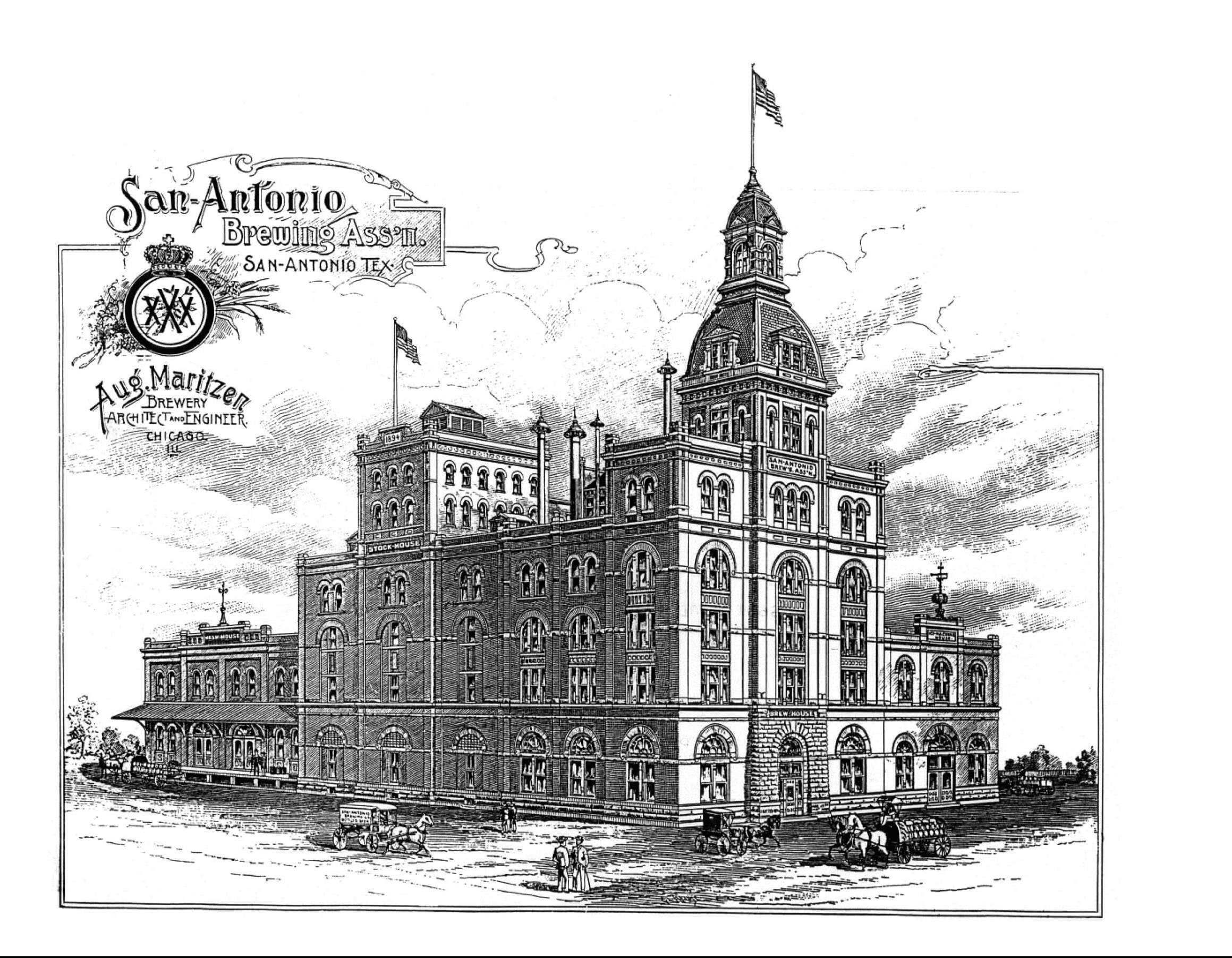
Architect Maritzen's rendering of Pearl Brewery

The structure was originally built in 1894 on 23 acres as the City Brewery (later becoming Pearl Brewery), and for a time was the tallest building in San Antonio. It was designed by Chicago architect August Maritzen in Second Empire style.

== History ==
Before becoming a hotel, Hotel Emma was an American brewery established in 1881 as the J.B. Behloradsky Brewery. In 1883, the San Antonio Brewing Association acquired the company. By 1916, Pearl was the largest brewery in Texas and the only brewery to survive Prohibition. In 2001, the brewery officially closed. In 2002, Silver Ventures, Inc. acquired the property.

Hotel Emma is named after Emma Koehler, wife of Pearl President Otto Koehler. Following the death of her husband in 1914, Emma took over as Pearl's CEO. Emma kept the brewery doors open during Prohibition by expanding business lines to encompass auto repair, soft drinks, ice cream and dry cleaning. This prevented the brewery from closing, and saved hundreds of people from losing their jobs. Although she retired in 1933, Emma remained active behind the scenes in Pearl operations until her death in 1947.

== Construction and design ==
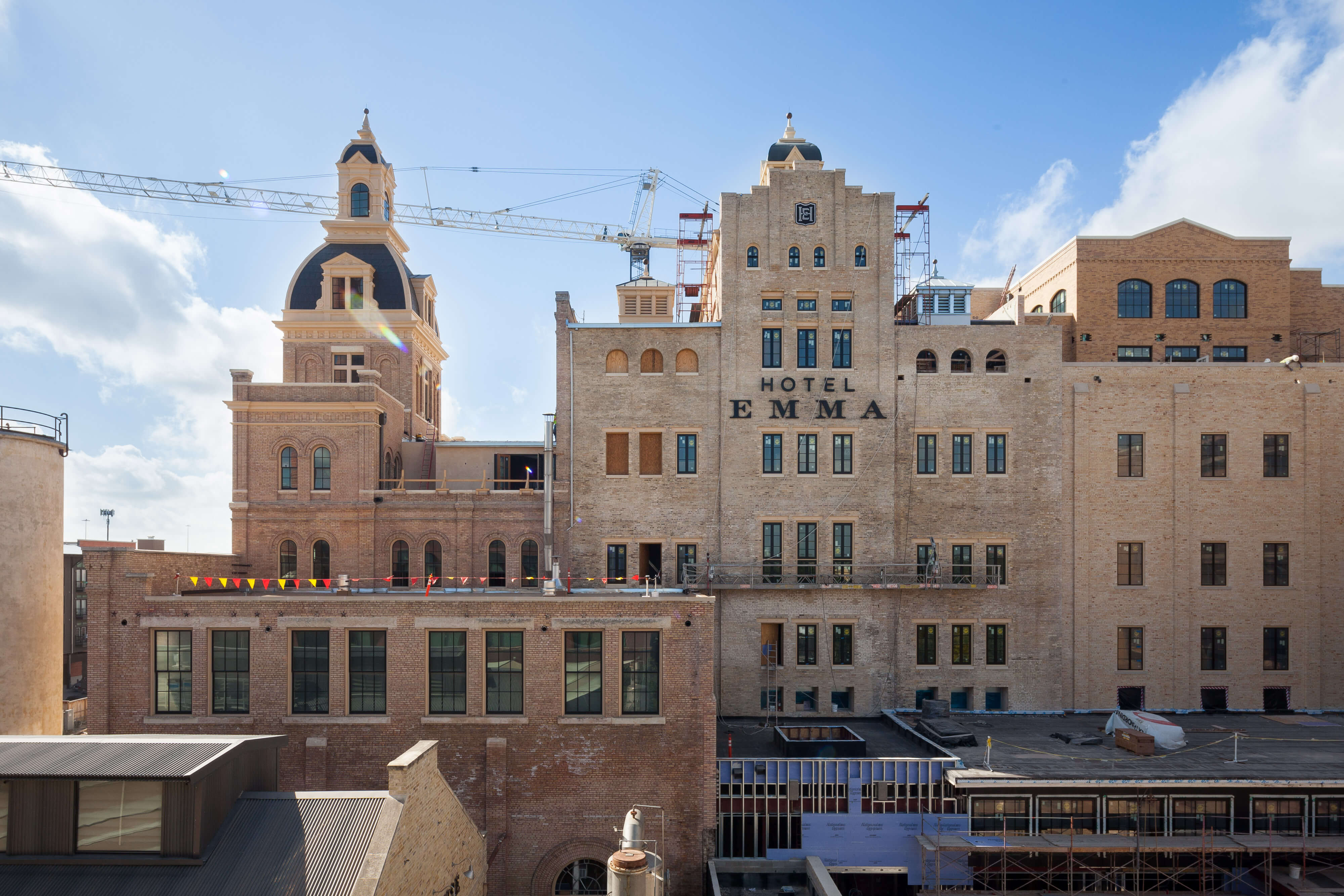
Construction of the hotel

Construction for Hotel Emma began on December 10, 2012 with three architects and design firms secured: Three Living Architecture, Roman and Williams, and Powell & Carson Architects & Planners. Keeping much of the original architectural integrity and design, existing machinery and pieces were salvaged, as well as the original 134-foot brewery tower, resulting in a variety of different architectural styles. The Hotel Emma opened on November 12, 2015.

The hotel includes more than 160,000 square feet of floor space, with 6,000 square feet of meeting and venue space. It also features cellar spaces for events, receptions and gatherings. The hotel has two towers; the original tower stands at 134 feet with eight floors, and the newly constructed tower stands 78 feet with six floors.

== Features ==
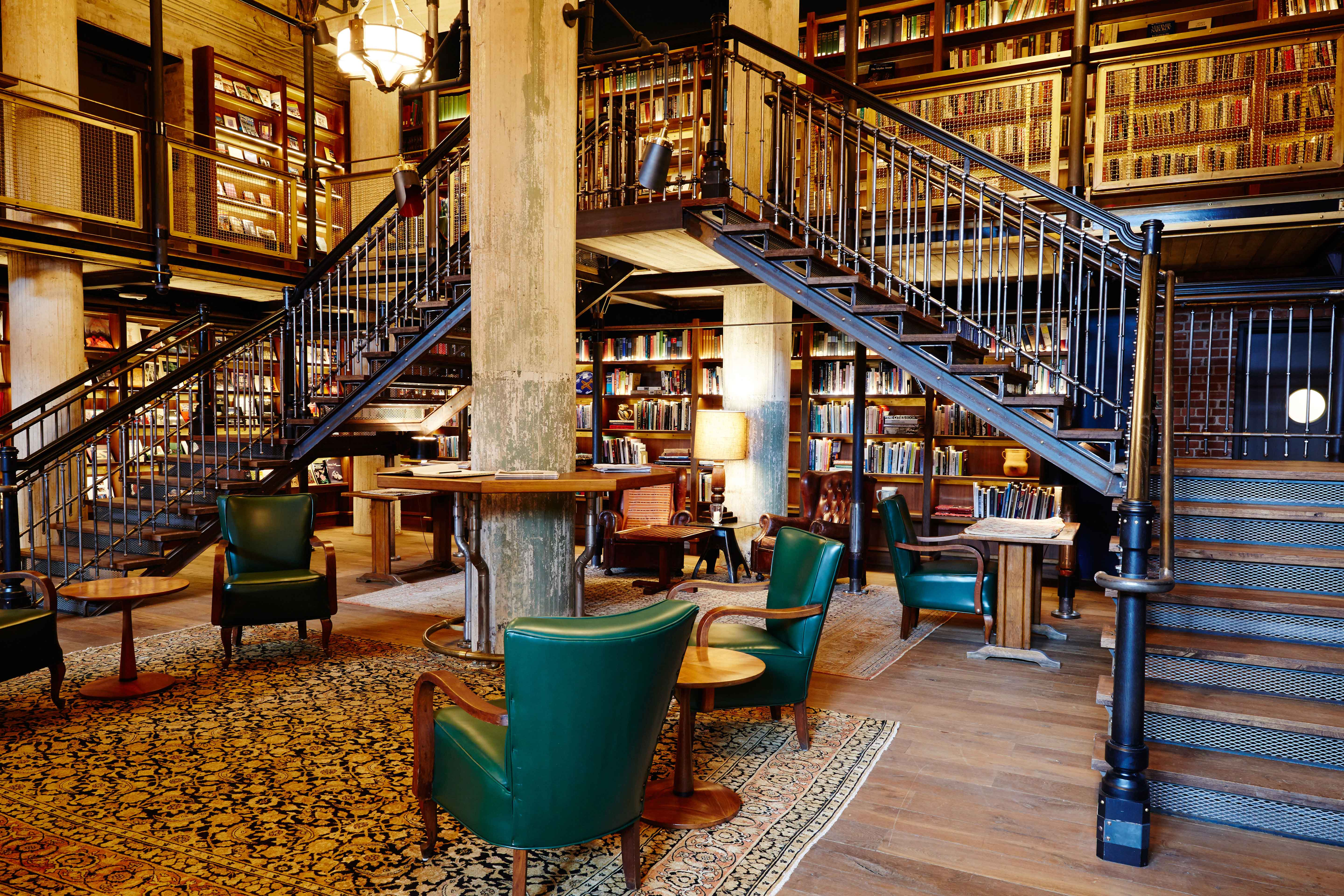
Library in Hotel Emma

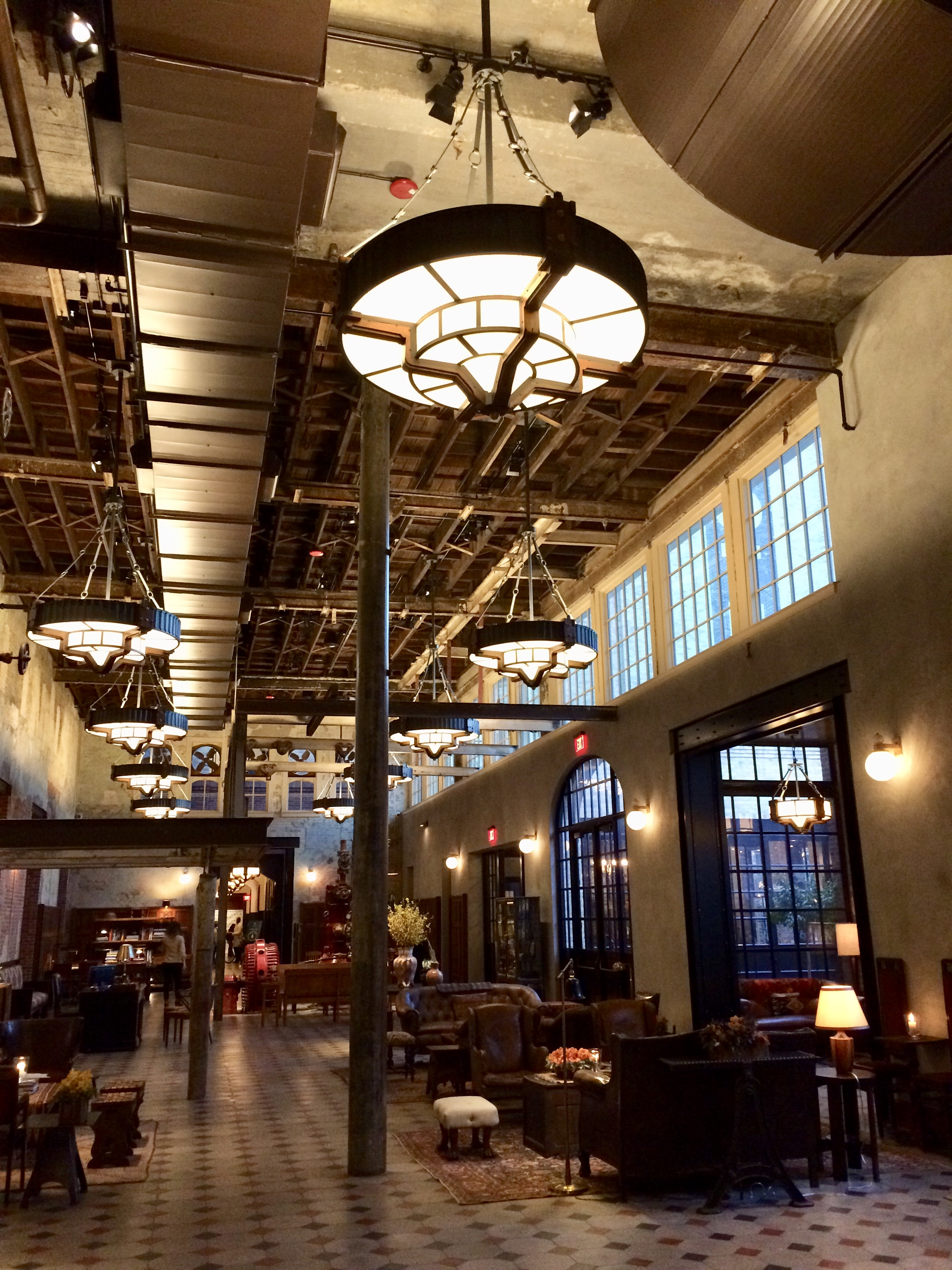
View of the lobby

Throughout the planning, design and construction, architects and designers concentrated on preserving as much of the original structure and machinery as possible, integrating these components in the overall design.
