= Koehler Cultural Center =

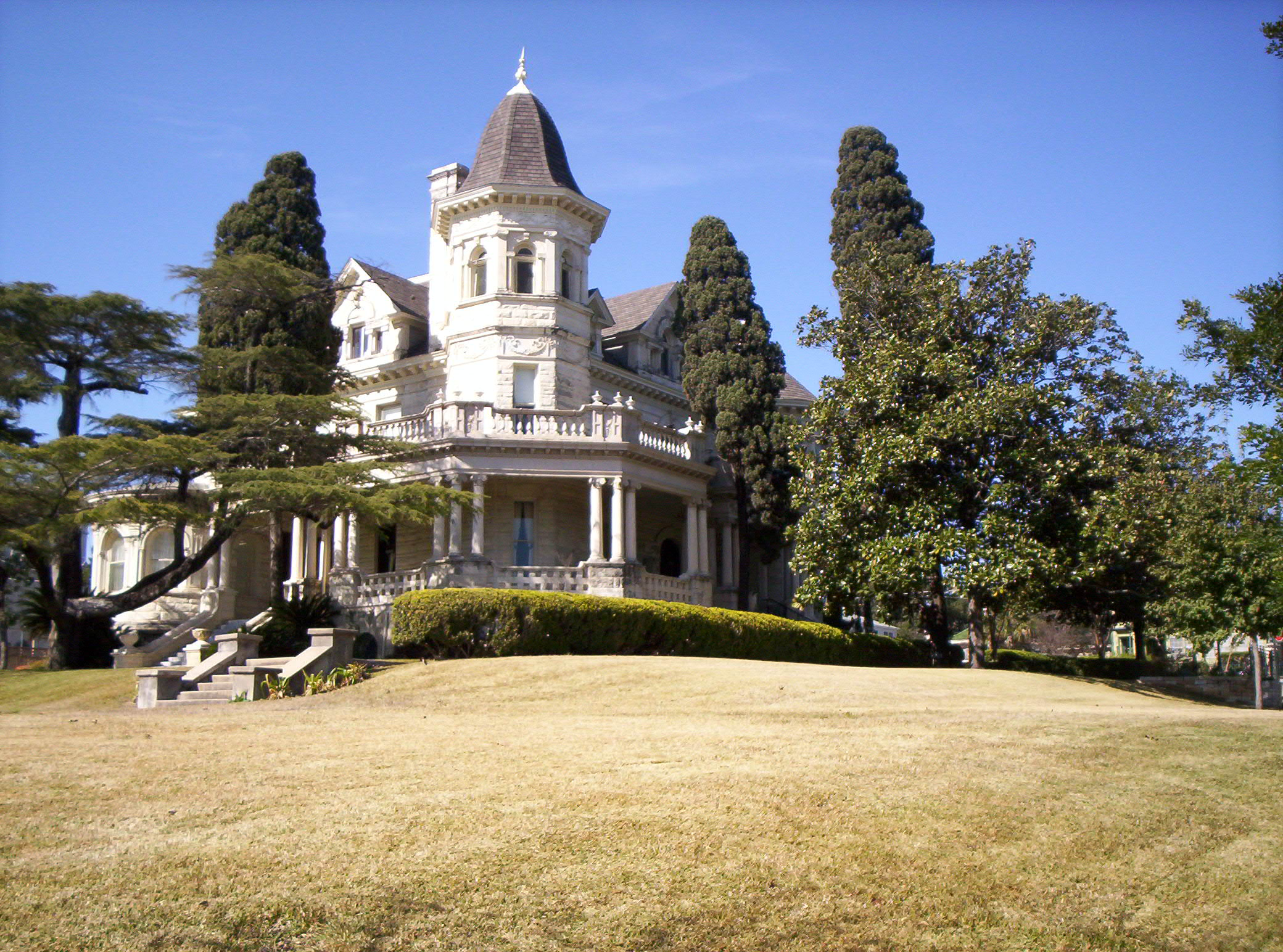
- Koehler Cultural Center in 2007
- Established: 1971
- Location: 310 W. Ashby Pl., San Antonio, Texas; 29°26′56″N 98°29′49″W
- Website: Koehler House
- Otto Koehler House (the United States)

History
- Built: 1901
- Built by: Jaco Wagner

Site notes
- Architect: Carol von Seutter
- Architectural styles: Eclecticism, Victorian

Recorded Texas Historic Landmark
- Designated: 1975
- Reference no.: 2972

The Koehler Cultural Center, also known as the Otto Koehler House, is a historic mansion at 310 West Ashby Place in San Antonio, Texas. Built in 1901 for Pearl Brewing Company president Otto Koehler, the house was later donated to the Alamo Colleges District and used by San Antonio College. San Antonio College as a fine arts facility. The property was sold to Weston Urban in 2022. Although the company initially proposed converting the site into a hotel, restaurant, and entertainment venue, later plans called for the restored property to be leased to Great Hearts Texas for educational use. The property is a Recorded Texas Historic Landmark, designated in 1975.

== History ==
The house was built in 1901 for Otto Koehler, a German immigrant who served as the president of the Pearl Brewing Company. The house was among the first residences built in that area of San Antonio. It was designed by local architect Carl von Seutter and built by Jaco Wagner, with landscape design by G.A. Schattenberg. According to legend, Koehler selected the spot due to its unobstructed view of his brewery, and could determine whether or not his employees were hard at work by the color of the smoke coming from the smokestacks.

== Description ==
This Victorian style mansion is a good example of the eclectic architectural style that was popular during the late 19th century and early 20th century.

The house has three levels, 12,665 square feet of space, a ballroom on the top floor and a one-lane bowling alley in the basement.

== See also ==
- Recorded Texas Historic Landmarks in Bexar County
