= Pearl Brewing Company =

Former brewery in San Antonio, Texas

Coordinates: 29.44408°N 98.48031°W

- Founded: 1883
- Headquarters: San Antonio, Texas, United States
- Owner: Beer: Pabst Brewing Company; Brewery: Silver Ventures, Inc.

The Pearl Brewing Company (also known as the Pearl Brewery or just Pearl) was an American brewery established in 1883 in downtown San Antonio, Texas, United States. In 1985, Pearl's parent company purchased the Pabst Brewing Company and assumed the Pabst name.

In 1999, the Pabst Brewing Company began transferring its production to Miller Brewing on a contract basis and closed all of its own breweries. Pearl beer is still in production at Miller's Fort Worth, Texas, facility, but the Pearl Brewery in San Antonio was closed in 2001. Since then, the former brewery was purchased by Silver Ventures Inc, which has used the property as part of the revitalization efforts of southern Midtown and northern downtown San Antonio.

== History ==
=== 1881–1920: Origin to Prohibition ===
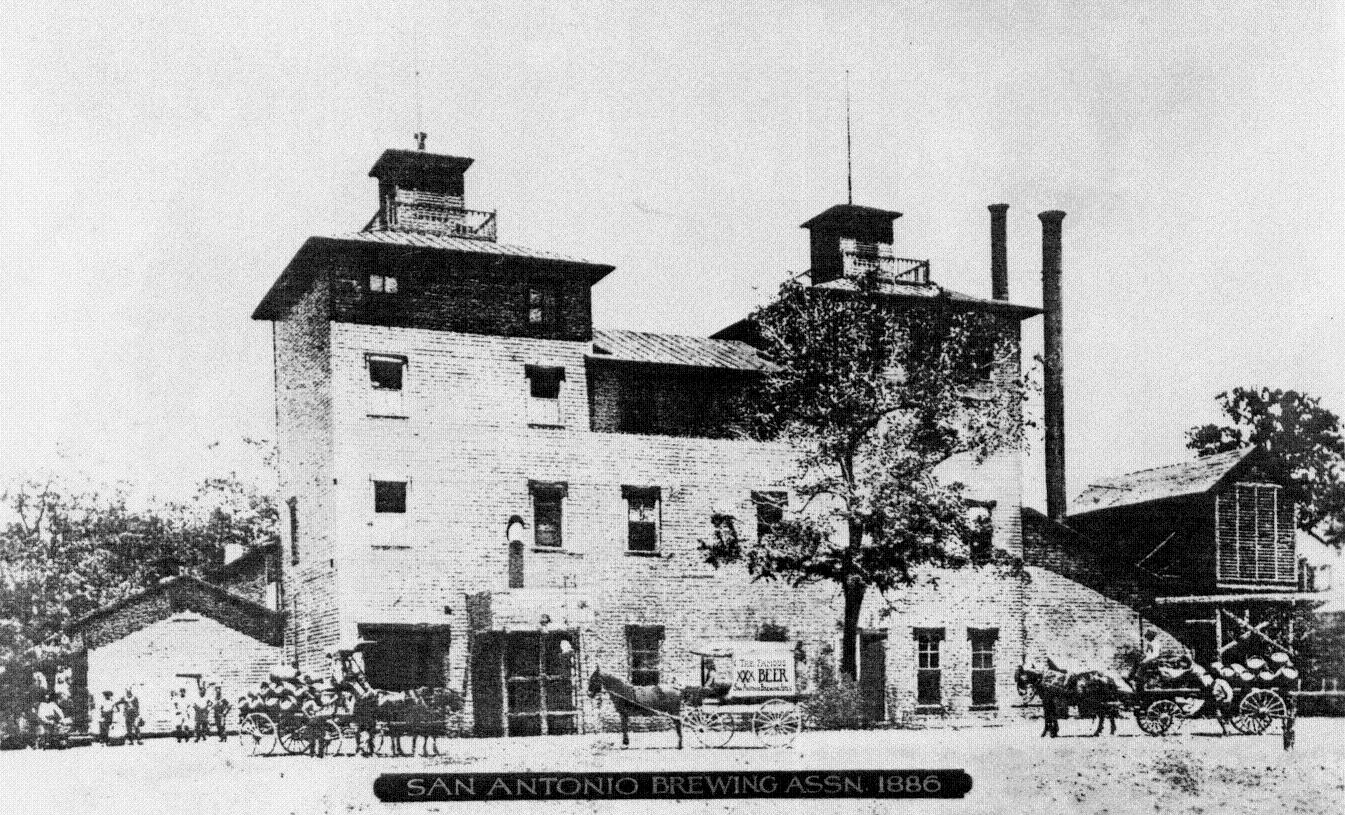
Original Behloradsky/City brewery

The site owned and operated by the Pearl Brewing Company was originally known as both the J. B. Behloradsky Brewery (1881–1883) and the City Brewery. Privately held and poorly run for two years, the City Brewery was purchased by an investment group in 1883. The investment group was composed of local people in business and several moguls already brewing at San Antonio's other major brewery, the Lone Star Brewing Company. Together they formed the San Antonio Brewing Company (1883–1888) and began raising capital to restart and improve the brewery's operations fully. In 1886, after three years, the company had secured the necessary capital and began full-time operations at the brewery again. The name San Antonio Brewing Association was used as a parent to the brewing company since it also managed some of the founding members' other business interests. Functionally, the business structure worked, but it confused city officials, customers, and business partners; therefore, in the end, the investment group dissolved the San Antonio Brewing Company and used the San Antonio Brewing Association (1888–1918) name for all operations and business transactions. Thus, in seven years, the same brewery had three different names; since then, the former brewery was purchased by Silver Ventures, Inc., which has used the property as part of the revitalization efforts of southern Midtown and northern Downtown San Antonio. In addition, the name City Brewery was frequently used. The first logos used for the San Antonio Brewing Company/Association even featured City Brewery in the logo. City Brewery was carried over from the Behloradsky days and was used until the beginning of Prohibition in 1918.

During these name changes, the brewery found the product that would become its signature brew. Pearl beer was formulated and first brewed in Bremen, Germany, by the Kaiser–Beck Brewery, which produces Beck's beer. Pearl beer's name came from Kaiser–Beck's brewmaster, who thought the foamy bubbles in a freshly poured glass of the brew resembled sparkling pearls. In Germany, the brew was called "Perle". When brought to the United States, the spelling was changed to English: Pearl. In 1886, the first bottles and wooden kegs of American Pearl beer rolled off the line and into local tap rooms.

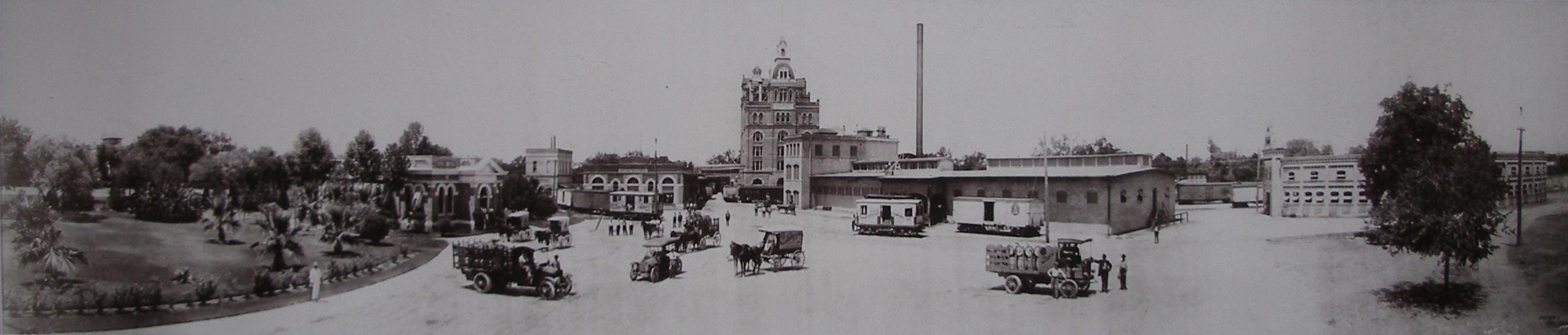
Panoramic photo of the brewery in 1910 (Staats Collection)

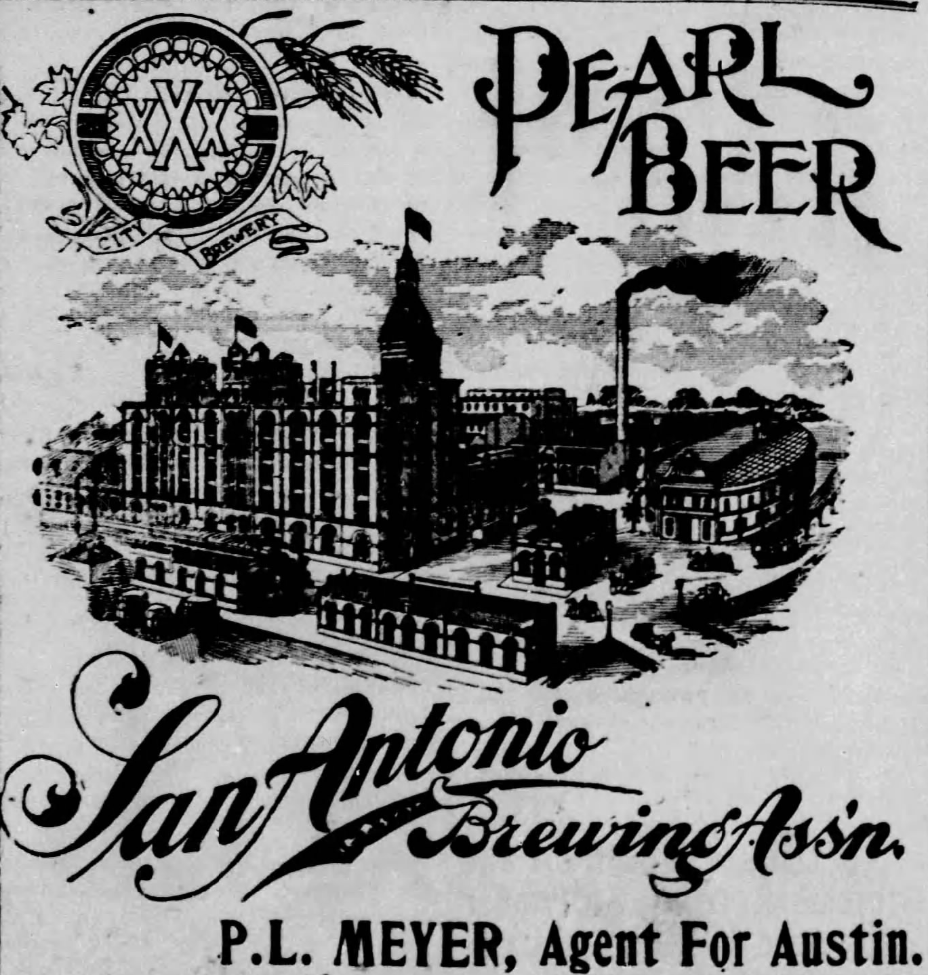
An 1889 ad in the Austin American-Statesman

In 1902, Otto Koehler took the helm of the brewery, leaving his position as manager at the Lone Star Brewing Company to become president and manager of the San Antonio Brewing Association. Under Otto's leadership, the brewery set strategic plans to grow in physical size and beer output in motion. The San Antonio Brewing Association went from a microbrewery that produced enough output for residents and businesses to a strong competitor to the much larger Lone Star Brewing Company. Koehler was one of the first residents to build in the newly opened Laurel Heights section of San Antonio. The hill on which Koehler built his home, now known as the Koehler Cultural Center, provided a clear view of the city skyline and, of course, included an unobstructed view of the San Antonio Brewing Association's City Brewery. Legend has it that by sitting on his porch, Koehler could determine whether his employees were hard at work by the smoke color rising from the brewery's stacks.

In 1902, Koehler purchased the property to re-open the since-closed Hot Wells hotel, spa, and bathhouse on the San Antonio River on the south side of San Antonio.

After Koehler's death, his wife, Emma, succeeded him as the chief executive. Under Emma Koehler's direction, many of her husband's strategic plans were either started or fulfilled. Namely, she modernized the original brew house, and by 1916, beer production capacity had significantly increased from 6,000 US barrels (720 m^{3}) per year in the early 20th century to over 110,000 US barrels (13,000 m^{3}) per year. With the tremendous production increase, the San Antonio Brewing Association was able to outpace the Lone Star Brewing Company to become the largest Texas brewery and the beer America most widely associated with Texas and the West.

During the early 20th century, Pearl used advertisement campaigns that featured Judge Roy Bean – one of the more colorful and famous law enforcement personalities of the Wild West.

=== Prohibition ===
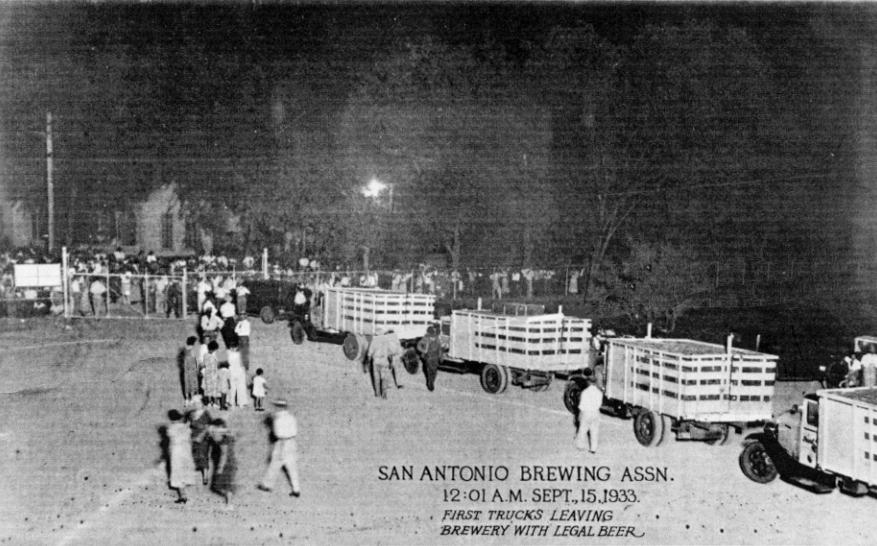
Prohibition ends at midnight and Pearl beer legally flows once more

Prior to Prohibition, Texas was a hot spot for beer production. With a strong German and European influence, small and regional breweries were found throughout the state. San Antonio enjoyed having two of Texas’ largest breweries: Lone Star Brewery and the San Antonio Brewing Association. Prohibition, though, changed the face of brewing and forced almost every brewery out of business. When the Volstead Act and Prohibition went into effect on January 16, 1920, Lone Star Brewing Company ended sales, shut the brewery doors, and dissolved the company.

Emma Koehler vowed not to let the brewery go under. In late 1919, the San Antonio Brewing Association changed its name to Alamo Industries (1919–1921) and began operations to comply with Prohibition laws. Times were tough for the brewery and its employees. However, the facility stayed open by continuing to produce a near beer called "La Perla", bottling soft drinks, dry cleaning, operating a small advertising sign division, running a small auto repair shop, and entering the commercial ice and creamery businesses. Being so diverse brought in cash for the company, which meant Alamo Industries did not acquire expertise in any area. As a result, Alamo Industries reorganized its product lines. The company changed its name to the Alamo Foods Company (1921–1933) and shifted its products toward food speciality. The sections for auto repair, dry cleaning, and advertising were closed or sold off to third parties.

Although no solid proof exists, rumors abound that Alamo Foods used the old brewery equipment for more than "La Perla" and that, in fact, the brewery still bottled a tiny amount of the real Pearl and Texas Pride for close friends and sale on the black market. One thing is sure, though: when the Blaine Act ended Prohibition at midnight on September 15, 1933, within minutes, 100 trucks and 25 railroad boxcars loaded with beer rolled out of the brewery grounds.

=== After Prohibition ===
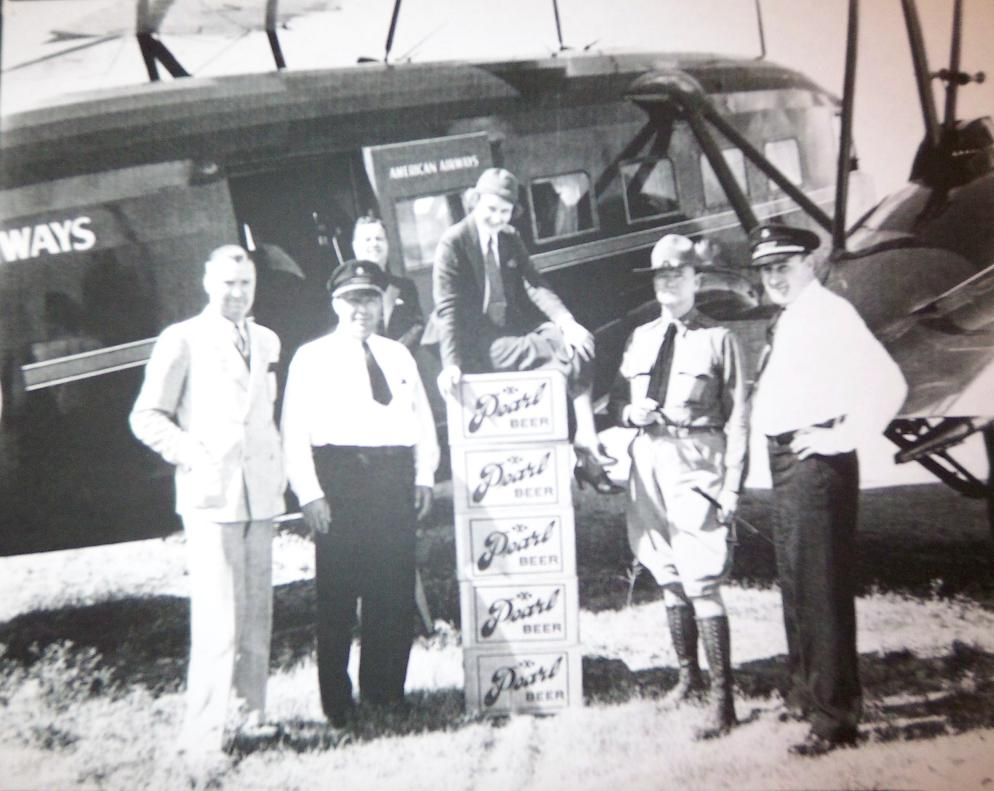
Cases of Pearl being flown to customers after Prohibition

With the end of Prohibition, so too came the end of the Alamo Foods Company. The company went back to its prior name: San Antonio Brewing Association (1933–1952). Most believed beer production would quickly return to the levels before the 1920 ban. However, Pearl's hard times were not over yet. In 1933, the nation was still deep in the grips of the Great Depression. Although most of the public would have loved to enjoy a Pearl, the financial situation of most made buying beer an unaffordable luxury. Through her skillful management, Emma Koehler kept the brewery afloat through the Depression, selling beer to those who could afford it and continuing many of the business ventures that had carried the brewery through Prohibition.

As the Great Depression ended in the United States, world affairs worsened and spun the globe toward World War II. After almost 26 years at the helm of the San Antonio Brewing Association, Emma Koehler decided it was time to relinquish the official title. Her "retirement" closed a chapter in the brewery's history. While it may not seem much these days, Emma's successful management role at Pearl was a breakthrough for its day. At a time when women's suffrage was still in its infancy and women did not yet have the right to vote, Emma Koehler led Texas’ largest brewery and one of the larger breweries in the nation.

Emma did not fade quietly into the history books, however. For years after her retirement, she remained an important part of brewery operations. While she did not have voting powers with the San Antonio Brewing Association, she typically had the final word on all large deals or changes. Emma's successor depended on her heavily after the transition and during the brewery's changes to meet the effort of World War II.

=== The Return of Otto Koehler ===
Otto and Emma Koehler's lives were filled with helping others and improving the community through various organizations and corporations. Otto and Emma never had children in their long marriage, but their extended family was huge. A large portion of their substantial wealth was spent on helping their families immigrate to the United States from their homeland in Germany. The Koehlers paid for family members' passage to New York and travel expenses to their city of choice, which was usually San Antonio or close proximity. Once relocated, the Koehlers helped set them up with housing and a job at the brewery or one of the other Koehler-owned companies.

One family the Koehlers helped was Otto's twin brother, Karl Koehler. Karl and his wife moved to Pennsylvania, where they had two boys. The older of the two boys was named after Otto. Born on July 24, 1893, as a youngster Otto A. and his younger brother were taken to Europe by their parents for what was supposed to be a short trip. On the trip however, Karl became seriously ill and decided to stay in Germany. In 1908, when Otto A. was just 15, his father finally succumbed to his illnesses and died. Otto A. returned to America and became a ward of his uncle Otto and aunt Emma. Otto A. developed a special bond with Otto and Emma, who treated him as a son. In 1921, Otto A. left his other jobs to come to the brewery to assist Emma in daily operations.

When Emma left her post, the board members and Emma picked Otto A. to be her successor. Emma served as Otto's advisor during the transition and his first years as head of the brewery, a position she held until her death on April 26, 1943.

=== Power struggle ===
Through the 1940s, operations at Pearl continued at a steady pace. Pearl was well established as the largest brewer in Texas, even though Lone Star beers had adopted the slogan proclaiming Lone Star the national beer of Texas. Pearl, as a company, did its part in the war effort, reducing can production to save on metals and producing generic beer for the troops abroad. At the end of the war, Pearl reestablished its aggressive growth drive and shifted marketing to focus on the emerging power buyer, the postwar housewife.

Production and market-wise, the 1950s were similar to the late 1940s. In the early '50s, the San Antonio Brewing Association felt they needed to increase the association of their number one product, Pearl lager beer, with the company itself. In marketing research, the association found that most consumers believed the San Antonio Brewing Association encompassed more than a single brewery; in fact, the public thought San Antonio Brewing Association referred to all brewing in San Antonio in general. Therefore, in 1952 the San Antonio Brewing Association changed its name to the Pearl Brewing Company (1952–present).

Pearl was successful, not only in Texas, but on a national level, as well. Larger companies saw this success and made many attempts to buy out Pearl and their beers. Almost all offers were never even considered. In what would turn out later to be ironic, one company came very close to buying out the Pearl Brewing Company in the 1950s: Pabst Brewing Company. B.B. McGimsey, who was Pearl's plant manager, shareholder, and the face of Pearl at most events, began gaining support to sell the brewery off. McGimsey was a charismatic leader whom most of the employees liked and respected. McGimsey's influence also reached other board members, and when the offer came from Pabst, it was not as easily dismissed. Details of the offer have long been lost, but one can surmise it was a good deal given the consideration given to it by Pearl. McGimsey believed that Pearl's stance as an independent Texas brewer would never allow them to truly compete on a national level with brewers from St. Louis and Milwaukee. Ultimately, the sale to Pabst was defeated by Otto A. and the other shareholders, but only by the slimmest of margins. Pearl maintained its independence for the time being.

=== Goetz Brewing Company ===
Although narrowly defeated in the vote to be acquired by Pabst, McGimsey and fellow members of Pearl's board still pushed for change in the company. The predominant theme throughout was growth. The acquisition of Pearl by a larger company was no longer considered, but then how could the company really grow and hope to compete with industry leaders such as Anheuser-Busch, Miller, and Pabst? Pearl considered expanding the San Antonio brewery to increase production, but after researching the idea, Pearl realized expanding the brewery could only gain them a nominal production increase and ultimately would not be worth the overall investment.

M.K. Goetz Brewing Company logo

Otto A. and the board began studying other companies to try to see what innovations or organizational structures were working, and if those changes could be applied to Pearl. Pearl's board noticed that the larger brewers such as Anheuser-Busch were not attempting to push more and more products out of a single brewery; instead, they had several breweries spread out to distribute their products. Pearl seized on the idea of a second brewery and began to explore the options. Location was a huge factor in the considerations. San Antonio's location allowed Pearl to reach both the East and West Coasts equally well. However, San Antonio's southern position was not ideal for reaching places such as Maine or Washington.

One idea was to build a second brewery somewhere in the northern Midwest. Initial studies of this idea proved too costly to be feasible. The price tag of land, permits, zoning, construction, equipment, manpower, and initial operations proved to be too large for Pearl to afford. Pearl could have raised the cash need for the project, but doing so would have extended the company a little too thin, and one misstep or hiccup in sales could force Pearl into bankruptcy.

Rather than building a second brewery and potentially putting the company at risk, Pearl decided to purchase an existing brewery to increase production and the distribution network. Overall, buying out another brewery meant a larger initial investment, but the new brewery would be able to put out Pearl beer almost immediately and therefore help recoup costs more quickly. From a short list of potentials, the M. K. Goetz Brewing Company in St. Joseph, Missouri, seemed the perfect fit for Pearl's plans. Goetz's historic brewery would allow increased production levels and the ability to use the well-established distribution network to help Pearl reach untapped markets. In addition, Pearl gained access to the Goetz line of beers, from pilsners to malt liquors.

In 1961, the Pearl Brewing Company officially purchased the M. K. Goetz Brewing Company. Overall, the merger of the two companies was a success. Beers from both companies began to be produced at the two facilities. Goetz brewed all of the Pearl beers for easier distribution in the north, and Pearl produced Goetz's Country Club malt liquor. Country Club proved very successful for Pearl, and in fact is the only Goetz beer still in production by Pabst today under the Pearl Brewing Company name. The merger was not without its problems, but overall the transition occurred smoothly. Pearl took over as the corporate headquarters and some duplicate jobs were eliminated. The production side of Goetz remained intact, with Pearl treating Goetz employees just as they did the employees in San Antonio, like family.

=== Judson Candies: Pearl's sweet tooth ===
Although Pearl had long dominated the Texas market over Lone Star, that did not stop the rivalry between the two. Each brewery was intent on being known as the brewery of Texas. Competition in the community was fierce, with both companies doing all they could to be associated with any large event. In the 1950s and '60s the competition was at its highest. For San Antonio's week-long festival called Fiesta, each company would sponsor as many floats and events as possible in an attempt to get their name out the most in the public eye. During the annual San Antonio Stock Show and Rodeo, Lone Star and Pearl would get into bidding wars over the blue ribbon winner of each show-animal category. The two breweries would drive the prices up sometimes triple the animal's worth, all in an attempt to best their rival.

The strangest twist to the seemingly endless rivalry involved a small candy company in San Antonio, called Judson Candies. In 1965, the Pearl Brewing Company bought Judson Candies from the three sons whose father had helped found the business. On its own, Judson was a profitable company that had an established name in the candy industry. Judson was not on the level of Hershey or Mars, but did have strong sales in the Southwest. Pearl simply made the Judson sons an offer they could not refuse. So, in 1965, Judson Candies joined the Pearl and Goetz families under the umbrella of the Pearl Brewing Company.

Judson was part of the company, but in many ways it was still very independent. Financial backing came down from Pearl, but Judson still made decisions on their own, setting their own strategic goals independently of Pearl. Whatever the decisions were at Judson, they obviously worked. From the day Pearl acquired them, until they were sold off to members of the Atkinson's Candy family in 1983, Judson remained a profitable business. When the Atkinsons bought Judson, the only real evidence of ownership by a larger company, and one in a completely different industry, was the office furniture and supplies. Everything in the Judson offices were labeled with "Property of the Pearl Brewing Company" and items such as pencils, pens, ashtrays, notepads, and even first aid kits were branded with the Pearl logos.

Although profitable and requiring little oversight, an official statement was never given on why Pearl purchased Judson. Other than support for Judson, Pearl never branded their name on any of the candy products, even in an era when it was completely acceptable for celebrities and popular cartoon characters to push adult-oriented items such as alcohol and cigarettes. From the surface, it makes no sense that a major brewery would enter a completely foreign market to buy a company and support it, yet not use the purchased company in the larger company's goals. It makes no sense at all, that is until one looks at the purchase in the context of the feud between Pearl and Lone Star.

In 1949, Mr. Harry Jersig became president of Lone Star, and effectively the nemesis to Otto A. Koehler. Through the '50s and '60s, competition between the two was fierce and generated a no-holds-barred mentality. Jersig had not always been in the brewing industry, and in fact got his start doing something completely different. Jersig learned the ropes of business while working in the Judson Candies Company for many years. In fact, Jersig worked at Judson so long, that he considered the owners and workers at Judson Candies like family. Decades later in 1965, Jersig's adopted family was purchased by his biggest competitor. Pearl's purchase of Judson might not have made any sense in the form of black-and-white business strategy, but it was pure gold in the propaganda and mental war against Lone Star.

=== 1970s – 1990s ===
In 1969, Pearl was acquired by Southdown, a conglomerate that started out in the sugar industry. In 1977, Pearl was sold to General Brewing of San Francisco, owned by Paul Kalmanovitz. Kalmanovitz specialized in leveraged buy-outs, which take over businesses to sell off their parts for profit, closing plants and laying off employees. After a takeover in St. Louis, brewery employees there flew the American flag at half-staff and upside down. Kalmanovitz in 1985 acquired the Pabst breweries, which itself originated in 1844, and proceeded to unite his holdings under the name Pabst Brewing Company rather than that of Lucky Lager.

=== 2000s ===
The new millennium did not bring a change in luck for Pearl or Pabst as a whole. Changes instituted in the 1990s saved money, but did not solve the company's larger problems. As of 2000, Pabst's new strategic plan was well underway. To save even more money, they had devised an idea to save the company, closing all of their breweries and ending their own beer production.

After 118 years of brewing along the San Antonio River, the doors to the Pearl Brewery closed.

In 2001, Silver Ventures, Inc. acquired the property and transitioned the brewery to the boutique hotel, Hotel Emma, which opened in 2015. The hotel is named after Emma Koehler, the wife of Pearl Brewery president Otto Koehler.

In 2020, Pearl relaunched its beer and changed their formula.

== Brands ==
Today, the Pabst Brewing Company is a marketing company; Pabst no longer owns or operates any of their former breweries. Pabst contracts out the brewing of all of their beers to other brewers. By far, Pabst's largest agreement is with Miller Brewing Company, which produces Pabst's major brands, as well as Pearl and Lone Star. Although Pabst's more popular beers such as Colt 45, Stroh's, and Pabst Blue Ribbon are produced at virtually every Miller facility, Pearl is only brewed at the Ft. Worth location.

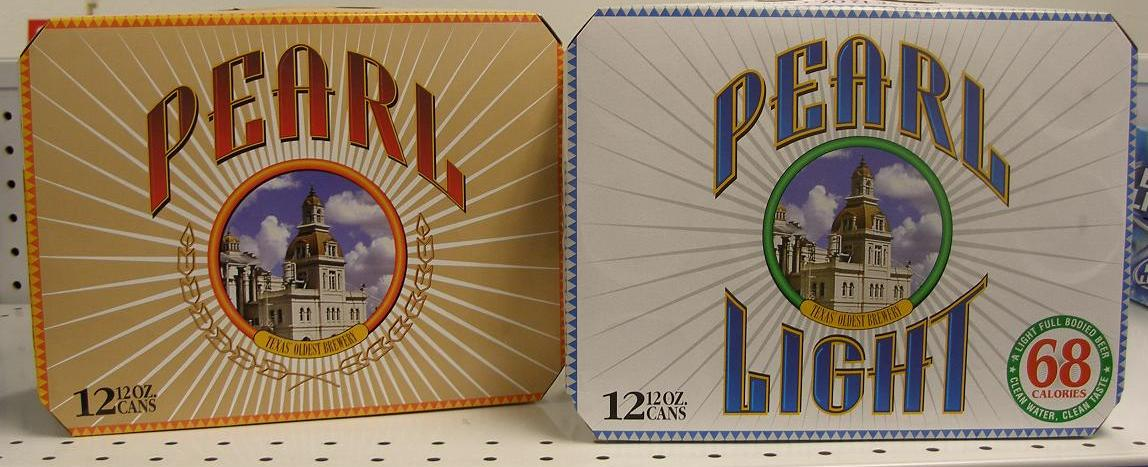
Cases of Pearl and Pearl Light today

Pearl, Pearl Light, and Country Club are still available to this day, but only in small volumes and in select markets such as Texas and Oklahoma. Today's distribution is greatly reduced from the 47-state coverage Pearl's beers once enjoyed. In addition, the variety in which Pearl's beers were available has also decreased. Although previously produced and sold in every form, such as bottles, cans, and kegs, the current iteration of Pearl is only available in 12-packs of 12-oz. cans. Likewise Country Club has been reduced to only 40-oz. bottles. Many who have tasted Pearl before and after the Pabst merger claim the formula has changed; customers say today's Pearl tastes like a weaker version of Budweiser. Officially, though, Pabst claims the formula used for today's Pearl is the same that was originally bought by the San Antonio Brewing Association back in 1886.

Pearl's three brews receive little or no marketing dollars, thus lack advertising campaigns. However, Pabst did launch an independent Pearl website which featured several pictures, history, and a state distributor locator. This website has been canned since ca. 2016.

== The brewery ==
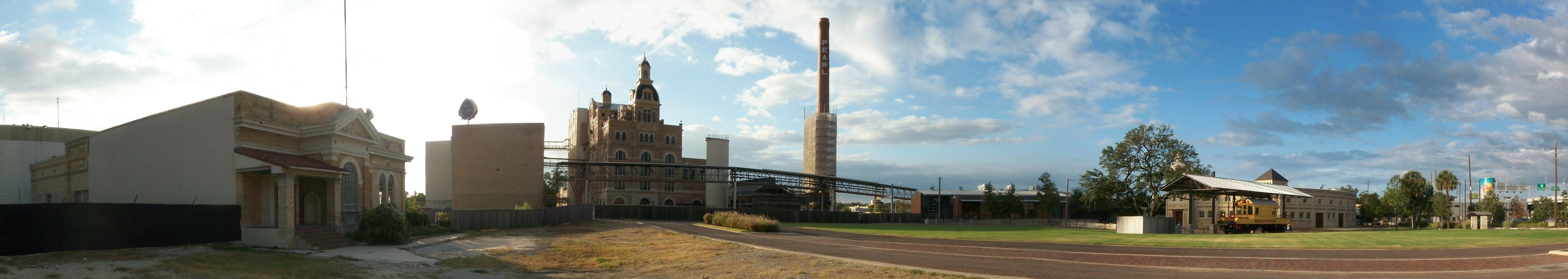
Panoramic photo of the brewery in October 2008

When operations ceased at the Pearl Brewery in 2001, many thought it would be the end for the brewery's buildings. The brewery's proximity to the core of downtown San Antonio and the easy access to several highways led many to believe it would be a prime target to be razed and replaced. However, these two attributes, along with another surprise development, actually saved the brewery facilities and helped to ensure its architecture would survive. San Antonio has begun work to expand the River Walk north to where the river meets U.S. Route 281. The Pearl Brewery is close to a section of the river expansion, thus making it an attractive location and eligible for incentives by the city to assist business development.

Toward the end of 2002, Silver Ventures, a San Antonio-based investment firm, purchased the 23-acre (93,000 m^{2}) brewery site. The company has big plans for many of the current structures on the brewery property, with the hopes to attract businesses as well as River Walk tourists. The dream of Silver Ventures is that once completed, the former brewery will be a village within eyesight of the skyscrapers of Downtown San Antonio. In a local article, Bill Shown, the development's managing director, described an area that would house an event hall, schools, and retail, office, and residential space. The idea is to create an area where people can live, shop, and work, yet a community close-knit enough where residents know the shop owners.

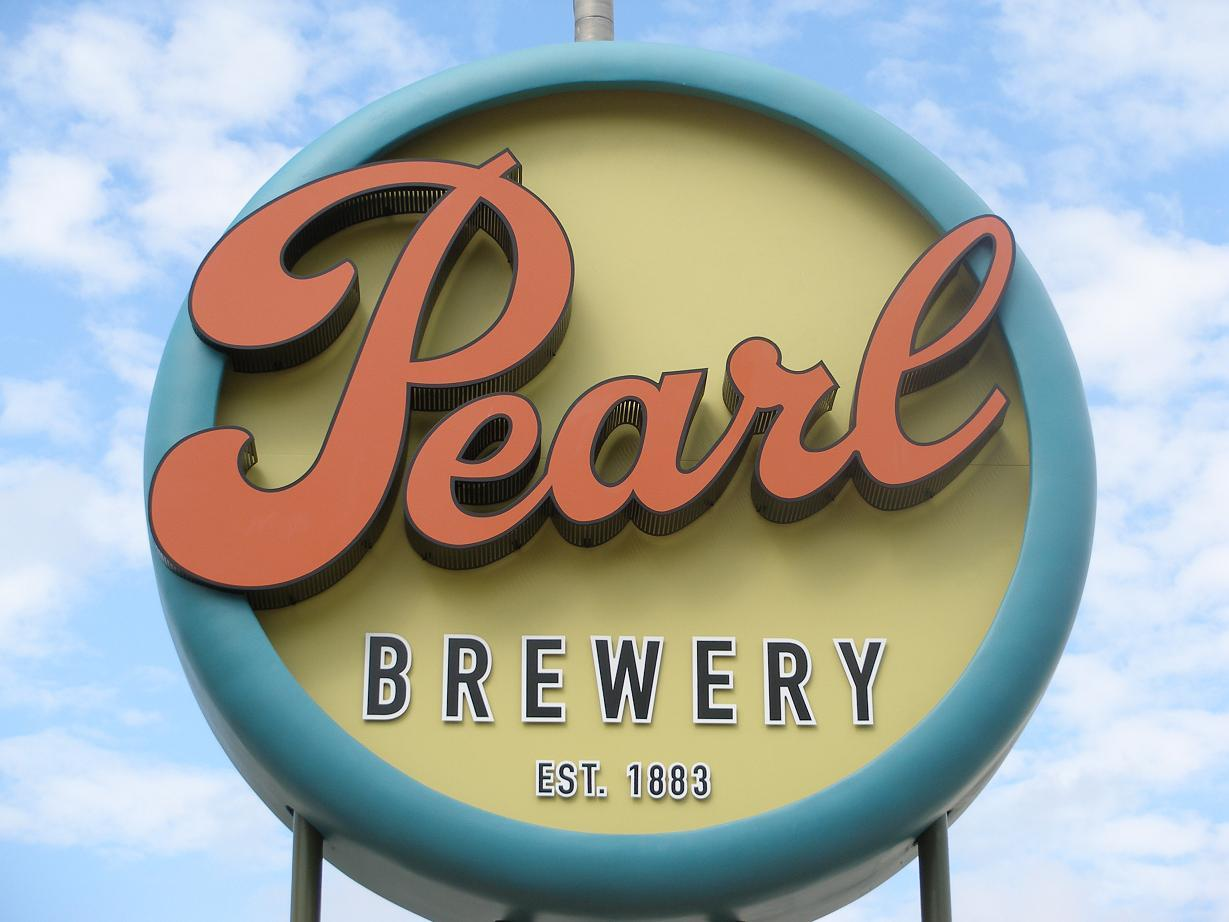
The brewery's new "retro" logo

The first phase of rehabilitation and restoration included the garage, a large brick storage shed, and the former hospitality room/stables. The brewery's garage, which was built in 1939, houses the Aveda Institute, a global company focusing on environmentally friendly personal products. In the same building as Aveda is a cafe named Texas Farm to Table, which only uses Texas-grown ingredients. The renovation updated the building to meet the current business needs, but still maintains the brewery feel to the exterior by reusing beer storage tanks as landscaping water tanks and a few of the garage's old red pumps.

The Culinary Institute of America (CIA) uses one of the brewery's large sheds. Originally created there as the Center for Foods of the Americas (CFA), an upscale culinary institute developed by the CIA, it was originally planned to occupy the former bottling shop, but a mysterious fire in November 2003 gutted the building and forced its demolition. CFA's current building's old garage doors have been removed and replaced by large windows to show off the lines of counters, sinks, and cookware hanging from the ceiling. The school offers a 30-week culinary arts certificate program, geared to take students from the very basics of cooking to the masterpiece where students prepare their own graduation celebration. In January 2008, CFA transformed from a Culinary Institute of America-supported program, to a full-fledged campus and was renamed the Culinary Institute of America–San Antonio.

The former Pearl Corral/Jersey Lilly has been completely remodeled and renamed. Now called the Pearl Stable, the new facility opened in May 2006 and serves as the showpiece of phase one of the overall project. The building retained its oval shape, and architects rebuilt the glazed skylight cupola and a recreation of the stable's false-front pediment, which were originally on the stable. Above the main entrance, the pediment displays the stable's construction date, 1894. The Pearl Stable is geared to compete with other event halls by offering a full commercial kitchen, easy loading access for caterers, and a state-of-the-art theatrical lighting and sound system. In addition, Pearl Stable will eventually house a museum section featuring the brewery's history through pictures, artifacts, and memorabilia. When Pearl Stable opened, Silver Ventures reached a milestone in the project, phase one was completed.

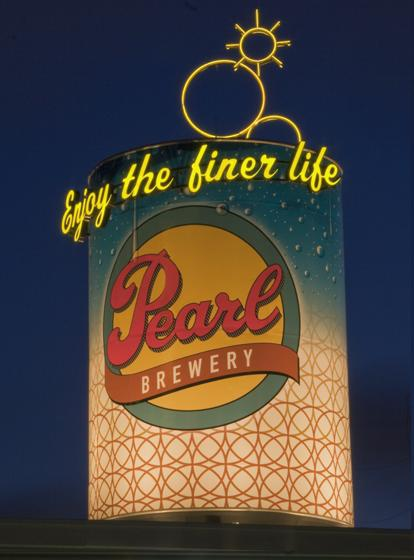
Can Recycle's giant can at night

May 2006 also had the return of another piece of history to the Pearl Brewery. As the new Pearl Stable opened its doors, Engine #2 of the Texas Transportation Company returned from a complete restoration. Originally built in 1909 as lot #758 by the St. Louis-based St. Louis Car Company, Engine #2 served two Texas-based companies prior to coming to Pearl. Most of its career in use was at the Pearl Brewery after the Texas Transportation Company purchased the engine in 1948. Today, the engine's paint scheme is exactly the one used on the locomotive from the time it arrived at the brewery through the early 1970s. Restored at the country's premier locomotive and passenger car restoration service, the Trans-Texas Rail Shop, Engine #2 is immaculate and one of the few examples of electric locomotives on display.

The Recycling Center, now known as the Can Recycle building, wrapped up construction in early December 2006. The old building is now gone, but the large silo that was decorated as a beer can was retained. The new structure is close to the shape of the old building, but its interior layout and use are vastly different. The surface has been reskinned with a shiny new can depicting the brewery's retro logo, neon beer bubbles, and the phrase "Enjoy the Finer Life", all accentuated with -ime lighting. The new facility contains three studio apartments and two business spaces. The majority of the building is occupied by the Synergy Studio, which provides a full line of yoga classes along with Nia, pilates, and numerous other movement-based workouts. The smaller retail space along Avenue A houses Run Wild Sports, which specializes in running supplies.

In late 2008, construction was completed on the old shipping warehouse on the north end of the brewery, now called Full Goods. The building was partially demolished and the remaining front section stripped of its aluminum siding. New sections were added onto the building to expand its space and divide the floor plans into a variety of commercial offices and retail space. The north side, which runs along Grayson Street, will serve as two-story low-cost live/work apartments for artists, where the artists can work in studio space on the ground floor and live on the second floor. In November 2008, tenants of Full Goods began moving in. The CE Group, an events-hosting company responsible for all events at the brewery, was the first to move into the building's new office spaces. By the end of the year, the building will house Silver Ventures, Rio Perla Properties, American Institute of Architects San Antonio, and The Nature Conservancy. Continuing with Silver Ventures' focus on food, Full Goods also houses 'Melissa Guerra', a Latin American food products and kitchen store, as well as two restaurants: 'Il Sogno', an Italian restaurant and 'La Gloria', which will offer Mexican street food. Full Goods is also home to a $1.35-million solar energy project, Texas' largest, with the capacity to generate 200 kilowatts of electricity.

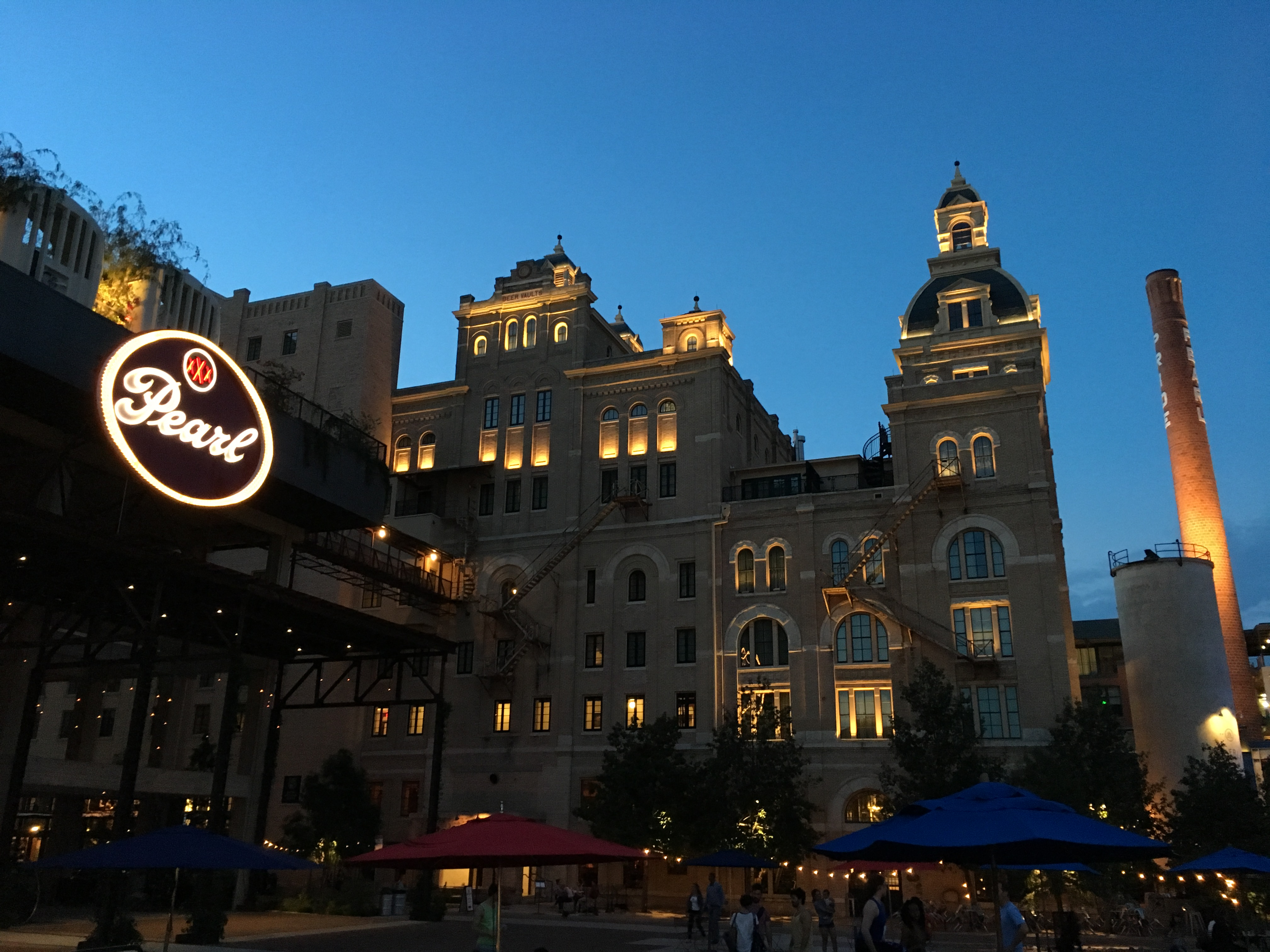
The Pearl, San Antonio, Texas, September 2017

Restoration continues on the brew house, the centerpiece of the complex. Silver Ventures recently wrapped up 18 months of restoration on the building's exterior. Today, the outside looks much like it did in 1894, especially with the return of the San Antonio Brewing Association company name back to the building plaque. The golden cupolas and white wash are gone from the building, instead the rooftops are charcoal, their original color, and the walls have been stripped down to show their natural stone. The brew house project is far from complete, though, with work remaining on the middle and rear of the building, as well as the entire interior.

== Marketing ==
During the early 20th century, Pearl used advertisement campaigns that featured Judge Roy Bean – one of the more colorful and popular law enforcement personalities of the wild, wild West. In Langtry, Texas, Judge Bean declared himself the "Law West of the Pecos" and ran his court in the town's tiny U.S. Post Office and bar called the Jersey Lilly Saloon. Judge Roy Bean was as famous in the late 19th and early 20th centuries as many of the motion picture stars are today. Judge Bean's favorite (and rumored only) beer in his saloon was Pearl. Seeing this as an opportunity, San Antonio Brewing Association for decades used the connection to Judge Bean and the Jersey Lilly as advertising focal points. Later, in the 1950s, the brewery's old horse stables were converted into a hospitality room and given a Roy Bean feel to them in honor of Judge Roy Bean and his saloon. The old stables were renovated again in the 1970s with the main hall renamed the Lily Langtry Room and the whole building named the Jersey Lilly. In addition, an exact replica of Bean's saloon was built and placed on the brewery grounds for use in Pearl's "Wild West Shows" and as a gift shop. The ties to Bean's larger-than-life legacy lasted almost a century, and remained predominantly visible in the brewery until its closing in 2001.

== Texas Transportation Company ==
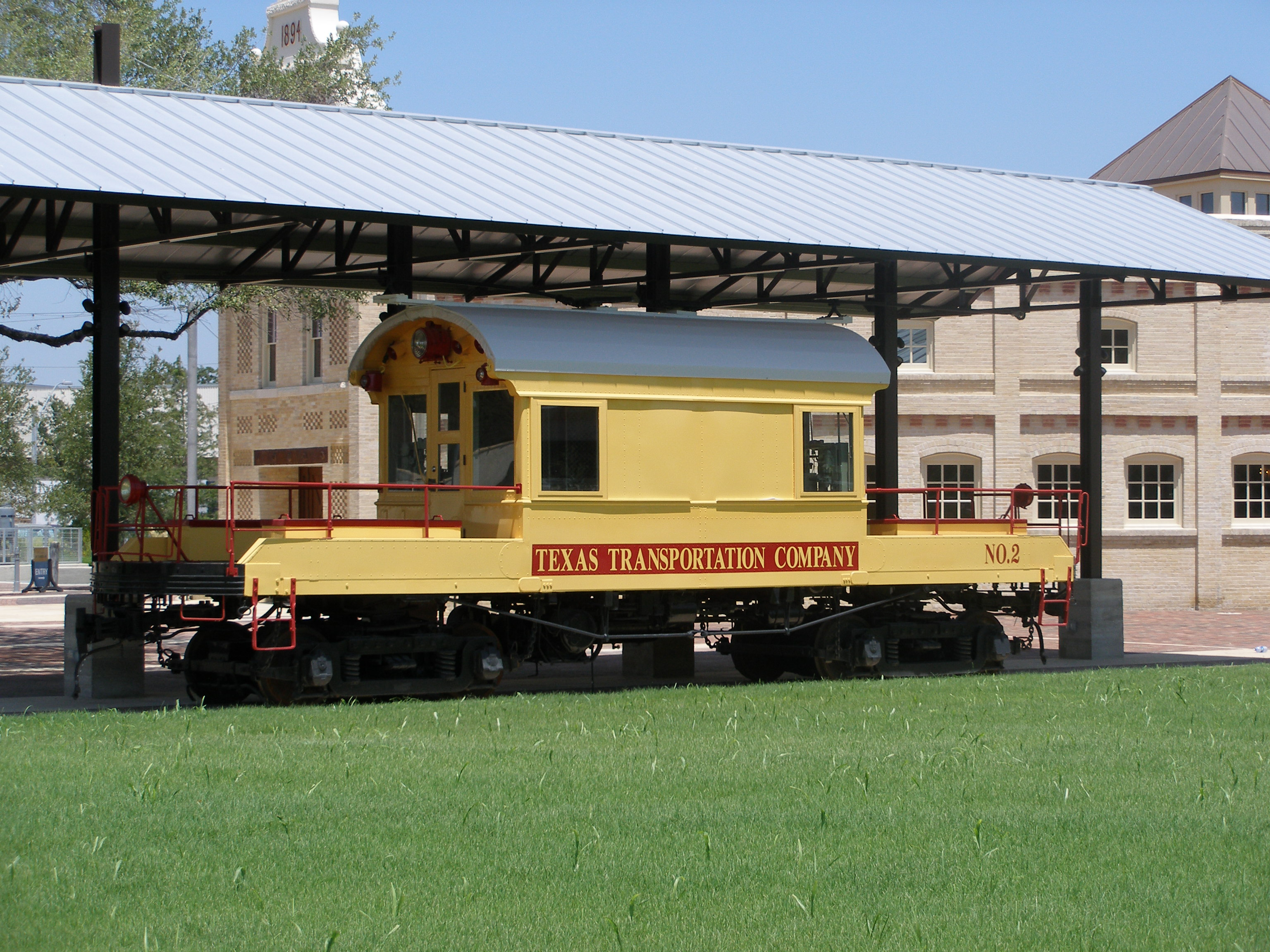
Texas Transportation Company's Engine #2 on display

The Texas Transportation Company (TXTC) was a class III short-line railroad in San Antonio that serviced the Pearl Brewery. The company operated electric locomotives on their 1.3-mile (2.1 km) line for more than 113 years. TXTC was started as a private company in 1887 until it was chartered on September 24, 1897. Volunteers from the Texas Transportation Museum operated a steam locomotive a caboose on TXTC trackage on Pearl property from 1964 to 1977 giving train rides to the public. In the early days when the Lone Star Brewing Company was located on W. Jones Avenue, TXTC serviced both breweries. Service ended for the line when the Pearl Brewery closed in 2001.

== Three xXx of Texas ==
The triple-X logo has long been associated with Pearl. In fact, it was used at the brewery even before Pearl beer became synonymous with the company. When the San Antonio Brewing Association bought the City Brewery and opened it for business in the 1880s, they used the triple Xs in the brewery's logo. Three large Xs were enclosed in a circle, with the words "City Brewery" on both sides or around the outside of the circle. This was the brewery's first logo under the San Antonio Brewing Association, thus it appeared on all of their advertising and the majority of their bottled and kegged beers.

With the start of Prohibition, the triple Xs disappeared as the company was forced to transform itself to try to survive. The brewery produced a wide variety of bottled drinks during the beer-less time, including near beer and root beer. Other companies picked up on the use of Xs on their near or root beers, the most famous of which being Triple XXX Root Beer, but Pearl (at that time Alamo Industries/Foods) never used the Xs on any of their products. The Xs were gone from the brewery during Prohibition, but not forgotten.

When the ban on beer ended in 1933, the brewery quickly began the production of Pearl and Texas Pride beer once again. Along with their return, the triple Xs returned, as well. The Xs were absent from advertising and the company logo for 15 years after Prohibition, but they held a prominent status on every single bottle. In the late 1940s, the brewery launched an advertising campaign stating the brewery's beers were the "Three xXx of Texas." The triple Xs took a renewed and increased role at the brewery, but their growth in prominence did not end there.

In 1952, when the San Antonio Brewing Association changed its name to the Pearl Brewing Company, the triple Xs joined the Pearl name as a dominant image on the product and the company as a whole. The triple Xs were back on the company logo and were used on almost all of Pearl's advertisements. The Xs held this significant role to the end of production at the brewery in 2001, when the brewery closed its doors and the company logo was abandoned. As production of Pearl and Pearl Light spun up at Miller's Fort Worth facility, the product logos were redesigned. The updated label does not use the triple Xs, so a significant part of company identity has been virtually eliminated from the Pearl beers. However, Pearl's Country Club malt liquor still displays the XXXs in its logo.

Many people wonder where the Xs came from, and how were they ever used on beer. In truth, the three Xs are actually a quality rating system. The system was initially used in Europe during the 16th Century. As European royalty traveled their lands and visited neighboring counties, a royal courier was sent ahead of the official party. The courier's job was to sample beer at inns along the way. If the beer was only average, the courier would mark the inn's sign or door with a single X. If the inn's beer was deemed good, the sign or door would receive two Xs. A mark on an inn of three Xs meant that the beer inside was excellent, and a must-stop for the royal court as they passed through.

The triple Xs were adopted by the San Antonio Brewing Association to portray two things: the high quality of their beers, and the pride that workers put into their products. The triple Xs may be gone from company and Pearl beer logos, but it has not completely vanished. In the 1960s, Pearl absorbed the Goetz Brewing Company and made Country Club Malt Liquor one of Pearl's key products. When Country Club received its only product makeover a few years after the buyout, it gained the triple Xs in its logo. The Xs were situated in the top-center of the logo's crown. Country Club is still produced today, and it still carries the "xXx" mark of Pearl.

In 2006, the triple Xs made a huge comeback. When the old horse stables were converted from the Jersey Lilly into the Pearl Stable by Silver Ventures, the "xXx" was a massive part of the building's motif. The triple Xs were incorporated into areas such as the chandeliers, the millwork above all the doors, massive bronze plaques above the stage and around the mezzanine, in the custom carpet, and even the rafter bracing. At almost every event, the audience is dared to count all the sets of triple Xs.

== Pearl City, Texas ==
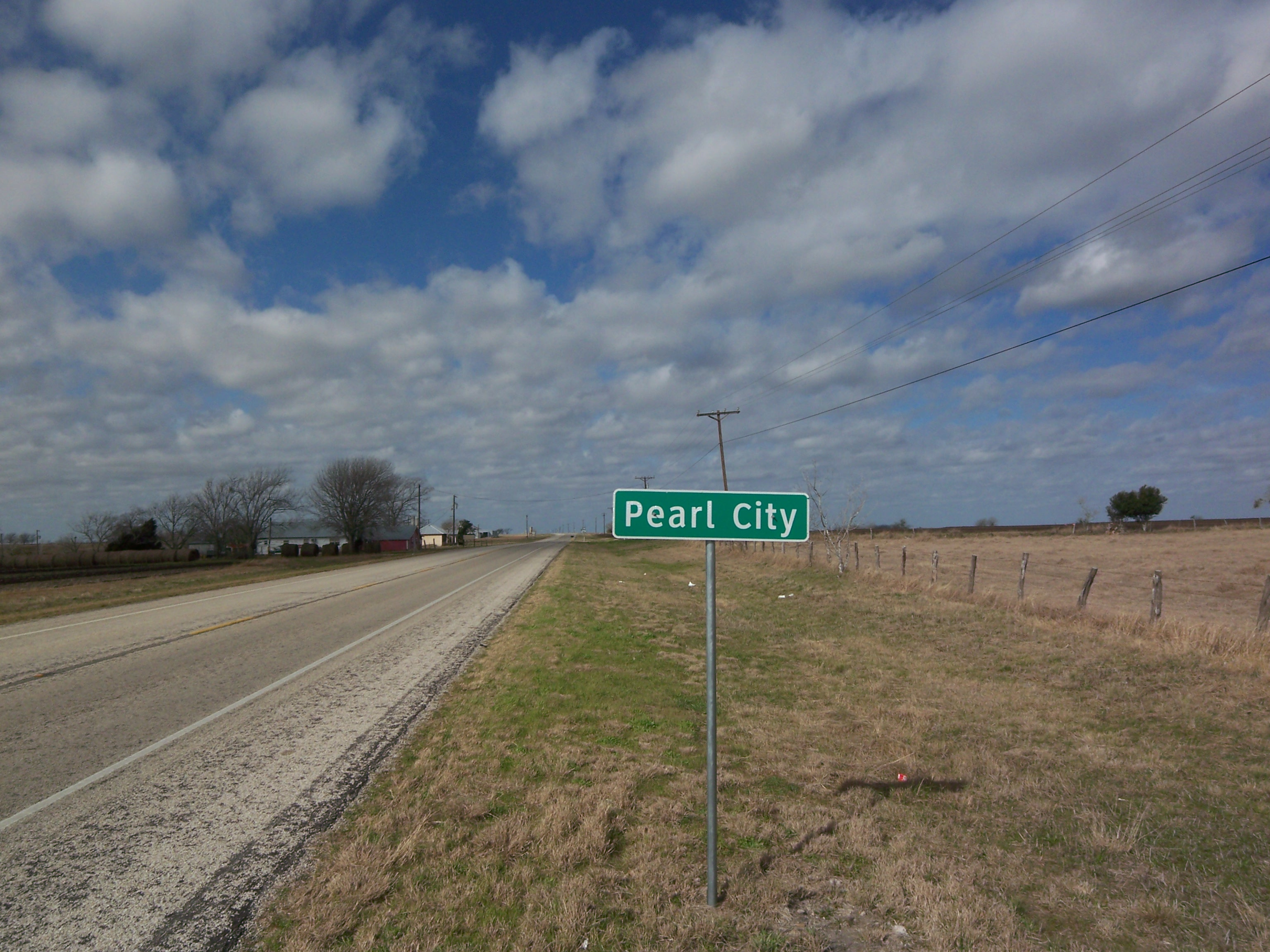
Pearl City, Texas

It is not uncommon to see beers named after the towns where they were brewed. For example, Texas' own Shiner is brewed in Shiner, Texas. However, what is not common is a town named after a beer. That is exactly what happened, though, in Texas with Pearl. In a small community just west of Yoakum, Texas, a small store had the highest Pearl beer single-point sales for a number of years prior to Prohibition. Walter G. Hagen's general store was the focal point of the community, and it had sold Pearl's beers by the truckload and still sold a rather large volume of the Prohibition-era nonalcoholic Pearl. The idea to name the town after Pearl was concocted by Hagens and the local Pearl distributor, R. J. Eslinger. In 1942, the motion passed and the German/Czech town became known as Pearl City.

== Mural ==
When the Pearl Brewery, then the San Antonio Brewing Association, remodeled their stables into a new meeting/hospitality facility, they had no idea of the importance of some of their decorating choices. The remodeled stables, dubbed the Pearl Corral, focused on a Western theme, with a wide range of influences. The corral contained a replica of Judge Roy Bean's saloon, cactus decorations, ranching fence lines, and the center attraction – a massive mural depicting the days of the old West. Created by Southwest artist James Buchanan "Buck" Winn, his work titled The History of Ranching measured 6 feet (1.8 m) tall and over 280 feet (85 m) wide. The mural wrapped completely around the Corral's main room and remained there for two decades.

Texas State University's portion of the Buck Winn mural: This section alone is over 75 feet (23 m) wide.

== See also ==
- List of defunct breweries in the United States
