= Chappaqua station =

Metro-North Railroad station in New York

Chappaqua
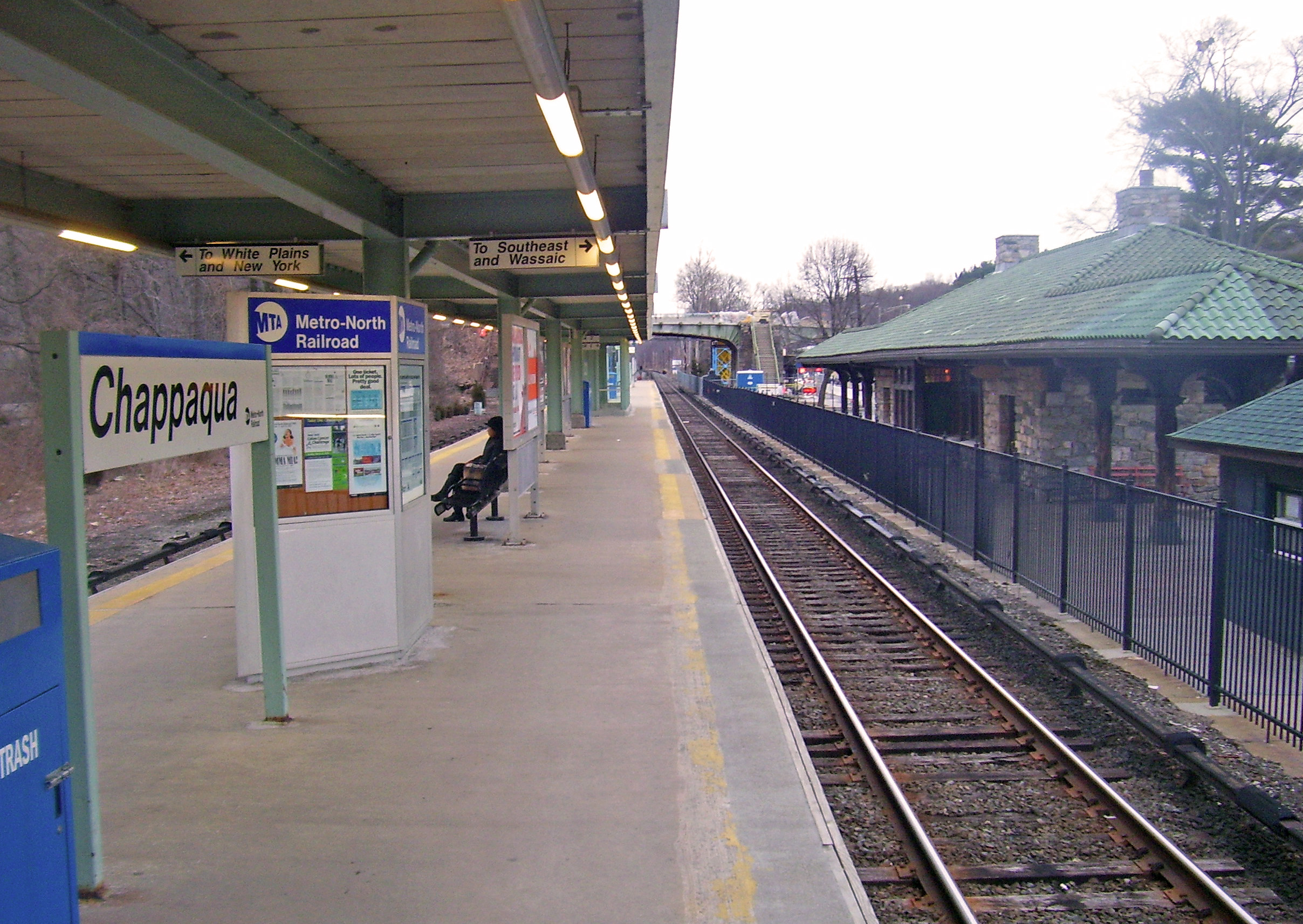
- View north from platform, 2009, with historic station on right

General information
- Location: 108 Allen Place, Chappaqua, New York
- Line: Harlem Line
- Platforms: 1 island platform
- Tracks: 2
- Connections: Bee-Line: 19

Construction
- Parking: 1,416 spaces
- Accessible: Yes

Other information
- Fare zone: 5

History
- Opened: June 1, 1847
- Rebuilt: –June 14, 1902; 2007
- Electrified: 1984; 700V (DC) third rail
- Former names: Chapequa

Passengers
- 2018: 2,038 (Metro-North)
- Rank: 30 of 109

Services
Preceding station	Metro-North Railroad	Following station
Pleasantville toward Grand Central	Harlem Line	Mount Kisco toward Southeast
North White Plains toward Grand Central	Harlem Line	Goldens Bridge toward Wassaic

Former services
Preceding station	New York Central Railroad	Following station
Pleasantville toward New York	Harlem Division	Mount Kisco toward Chatham
- Chappaqua Railroad Depot and Depot Plaza
- U.S. National Register of Historic Places
- Coordinates: 41°9′28.44″N 73°46′29.64″W
- Area: 2.7 acres (1 ha)
- Built: 1902
- Architect: Nicholas Grant
- Architectural style: Richardsonian Romanesque
- MPS: Horace Greeley Related Sites TR
- NRHP reference No.: 79003210
- Added to NRHP: April 19, 1979
Location

Chappaqua station is a commuter rail stop on the Metro-North Railroad's Harlem Line, located in Chappaqua, New York, United States, within the town of New Castle.

Next to the modern station is the building opened by the New York Central Railroad in 1902. Still in use as a waiting area, it is part of the Chappaqua Railroad Depot and Depot Plaza listed on the National Register of Historic Places since 1979. It was built on land donated by the daughter of Horace Greeley, a prominent newspaper editor and presidential candidate who had moved to Chappaqua in the mid-19th century and been responsible for much of its early development, on the condition that a small park adjacent to the station be maintained.

== History ==
Station with a mail train in its early years

Chappaqua was first settled by Quakers moving inland from Long Island Sound in the 1740s. For a century after that, it remained a self-sustaining farming community, centered around the meeting house 0.6 mile (1 km) north of the present downtown along Quaker Road. The meeting house and several other buildings remain from that era. They are now part of the Old Chappaqua Historic District, also listed on the National Register.

In 1846 the New York and Harlem Railroad laid the first tracks along the current route. That led to gradual changes in the economy and geography of Chappaqua. Farmers could now easily ship their crops to New York for sale, and many switched to growing cash crops to take advantage of this. A few businesses began to cluster around the original depot site, a few hundred feet north of the present station. Three buildings were eventually built close to the station.

The rail connection made it possible for those with social and commercial links to the city to maintain them, and some who had business there moved to Chappaqua. Among them was Horace Greeley, the crusading editor of the New York Tribune. He settled there with his wife and daughter in 1853, seeking a quiet country retreat from the demands of his job and a place to test the farming methods he advocated. Shortly after moving in he built the first concrete dairy barn in the country. In 1864 he bought a large farm south of the station and expanded its farmhouse. He lived there for the last nine years of his life.

His daughter Gabrielle inherited the farm. Over the remaining years of the 19th century more city residents followed her family's lead and moved out to Chappaqua. They often settled on farms that had been subdivided into large residential lots. By the turn of the century the 1846 depot was no longer able to handle its daily passenger and freight traffic, and the existing buildings were preventing easy access to the station. As sites for a new depot were being proposed and considered, with considerable opposition from the owners of the three buildings near the old station,. Gabrielle offered to donate the 2.7 acres (1.1 ha) where it presently stands for a station, a public park to always be maintained there, and an access road to be named Woodbine Avenue after her mother's family.

Her offer was accepted, and the station was built there. It was completed and opened in 1902, amid much local celebration. Its completion triggered the development of most of modern downtown Chappaqua, and accelerated the suburbanization of the community, as Gabrielle Greeley continued to subdivide the remnants of the farm for development by others until her death in 1937. The small park, decorated with a statue of her father and war memorial in 1914, remained per the stipulation of her original gift.

In the early 1970s the Penn Central Railroad, successor by merger to the New York Central Railroad, which had absorbed the New York and Harlem, went bankrupt. Commuter rail services it had operated were first run by Conrail, then by Metro-North Railroad after that agency was created under the aegis of New York's Metropolitan Transportation Authority (MTA). During the 1980s the new station, with elevated platforms, was built. Café La Track was opened in the old station a decade later.

In the early 2000s, 20 spaces in the station's lot were equipped with plug-in recharging stations for electric cars as part of a pilot program to encourage their use. Drivers of those vehicles were guaranteed access to one of those spaces. Three years later, during a $1.1 million renovation of the station, the owners of Café La Track, which occupied the southwestern corner of the station building, resorted to an online petition to successfully prevent themselves from being replaced by a Dunkin' Donuts franchise.

The historic station building was converted into a restaurant, Chappaqua Station, in 2015, while retaining much of the station's original character. As of 2019, the station is occupied by Bobo's Cafe.

== Station layout ==
The station has one eight-car-long high-level island platform serving trains in both directions.

== Buildings and grounds ==
Original 1902 station depot at Chappaqua

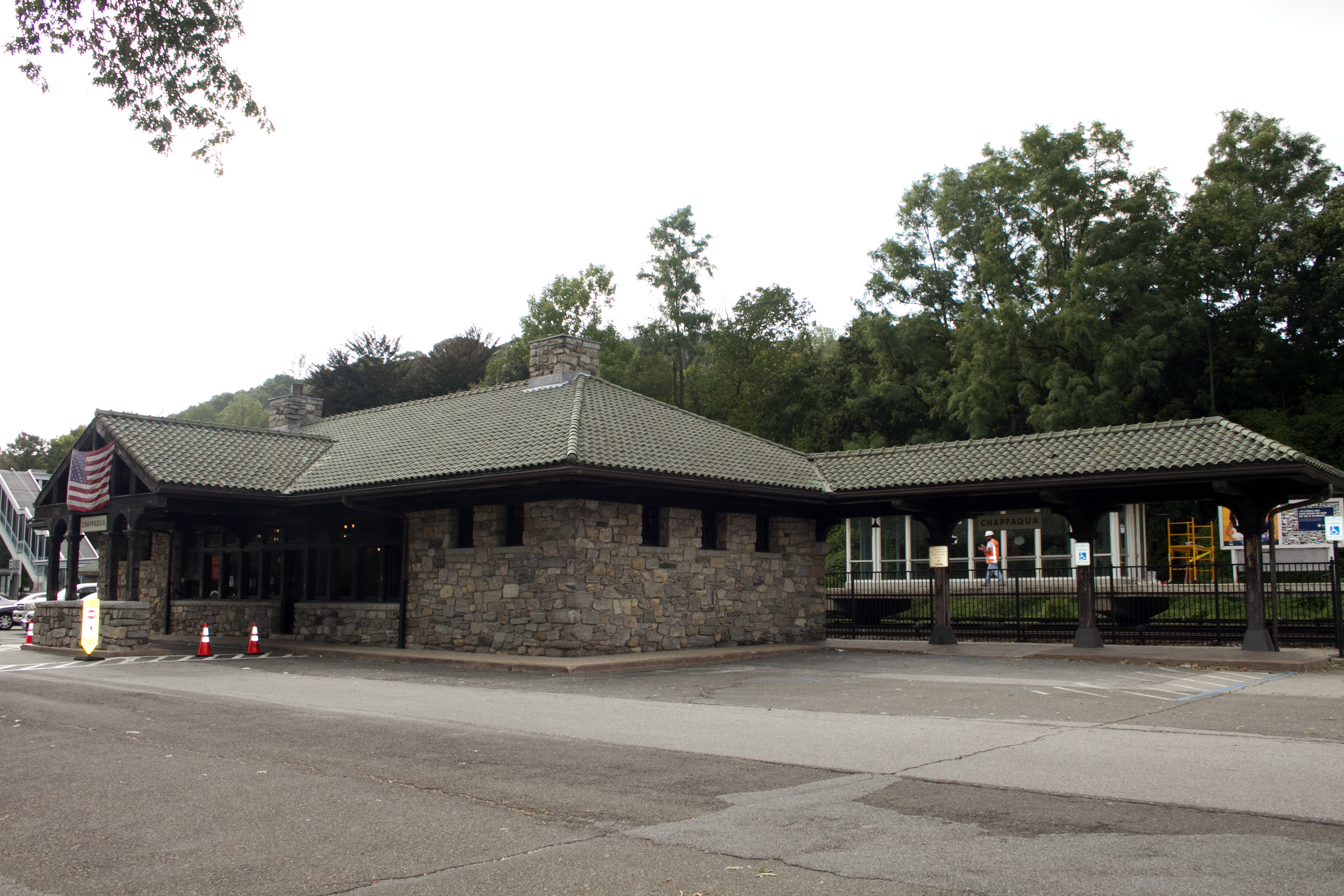
Exterior of the depot

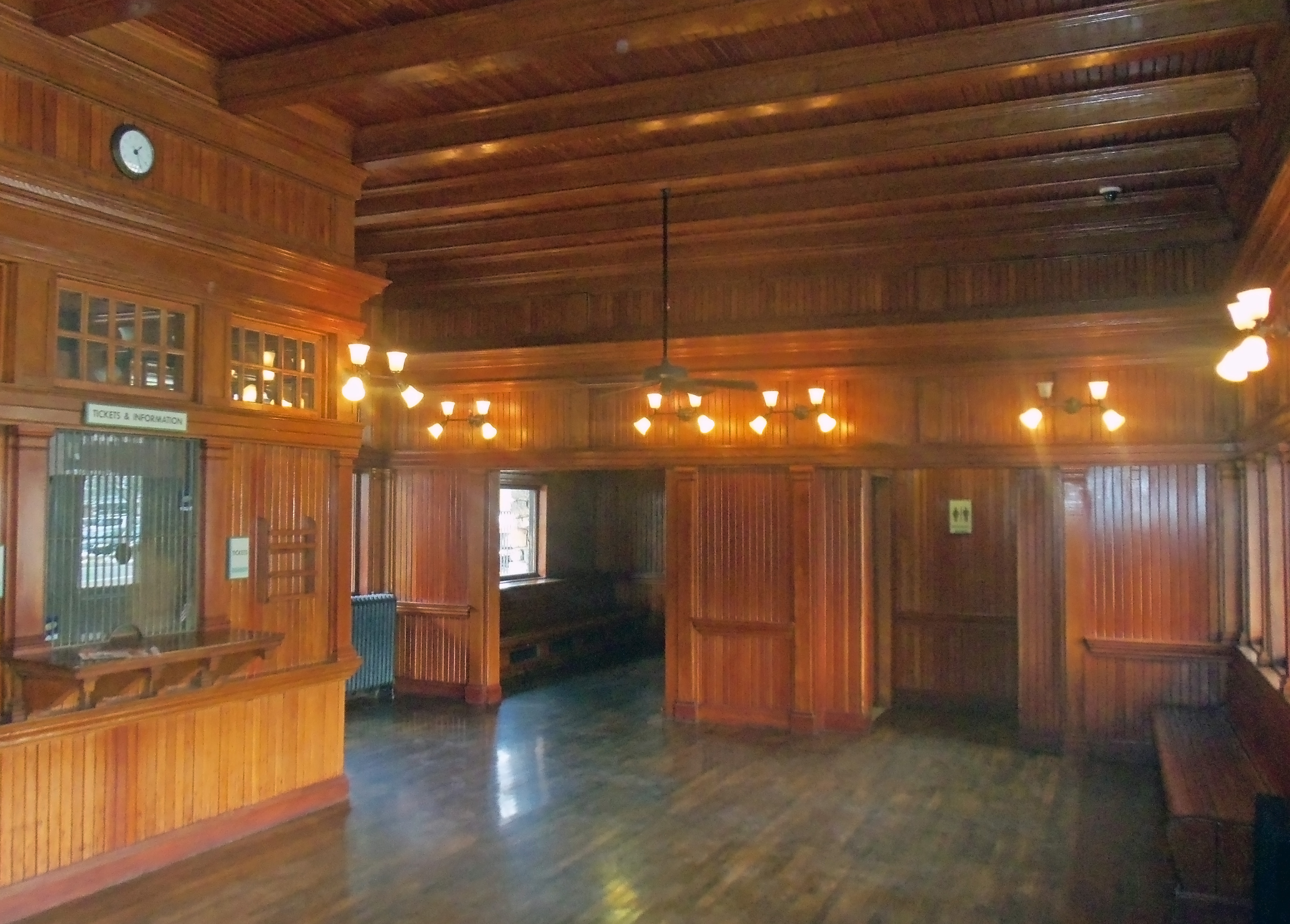
Interior of the depot prior to being converted to a restaurant

The station is located on the southwest corner of downtown Chappaqua, located in a low area amid hilly terrain just north of the Mount Pleasant town line. At that point the two railroad tracks run straight in a northeast-southwest heading, paralleling the Saw Mill River Parkway and the headwaters of the eponymous stream immediately to their west. Quaker Road (New York State Route 120) crosses over the tracks just north of the station, east of its interchange with the parkway. Beyond the Quaker Road bridge, a parking lot separates the road from the main commercial area of downtown around the intersection of King Street, South Greeley Avenue, and North Greeley Avenue.

East of the station, across South Greeley Avenue, are commercial buildings north of Woodburn Avenue and Robert E. Bell Middle School of the Chappaqua Central School District. South of it is the Episcopal Church of St. Mary the Virgin, also listed on the Register due to its connection to the Greeley family. A baseball diamond lies between the station and New Castle's town hall and the Chappaqua library on the south. To the southwest of the station its overflow parking spills out alongside the tracks to the town line.

Woodburn Avenue west of South Greeley serves as the station's entrance road. Parking is in concentric semicircles, mirroring the small park just east of the station. A statue of Greeley and war memorial are located just across Allen Place from the historic station building on the east side of the tracks. The entry stairs to the modern station are immediately to the south.

The historic building is a one-story fieldstone structure with a tiled hipped roof pierced at either end by two stone chimneys. On its west side, opposite the statue and war memorial, is a gabled porte-cochère supported by square bracketed wooden pillars atop a stone wall. West, along the tracks, a roofed arcade extends along the tracks. It is no longer necessary as a shelter for passengers awaiting trains since the tracks are now fenced off on that side and all ingress and egress from them is via the modern station.

A walkway and steps enclosed with glass and aluminum climb to a similarly treated overpass from both north and south, with an elevator in a brick shaft between them. In the overpass are ticket machines, on the west end of the overpass, another enclosed stairwell and another elevator in a brick shaft descend to the elevated concrete island platform between the tracks.

The platform, long enough to accommodate eight cars, extends about 50 feet (15 m) to the south of the overpass. North of the overpass it continues to slightly north of the Quaker Road overpass. A roof covers the first hundred feet (30 m). Along its length are ornate metal streetlights, enclosed shelters, and some vending machines.

The historic station was converted to a café in 2015. While the ticket counter closed, the cafe retains most of the station's original elements, including the waiting area benches and the original ticket counter, which serves as a check-out counter. It is decorated entirely in wood, from the flooring to the vertical siding to the exposed ceiling rafters. There is a simple molding at the floor, and a more decorative one at the chair rail level and then running around the waiting room at the top of the entryways, all of which are flanked by smooth square pilasters. Above that level is a paneled entablature (with ten-pane horizontal casement windows above the former ticket office), with another molded cornice at the ceiling.

== See also ==
- List of Metro-North Railroad stations
- National Register of Historic Places listings in northern Westchester County, New York
