= Rehoboth (Chappaqua, New York) =

Historic house

- U.S. National Register of Historic Places
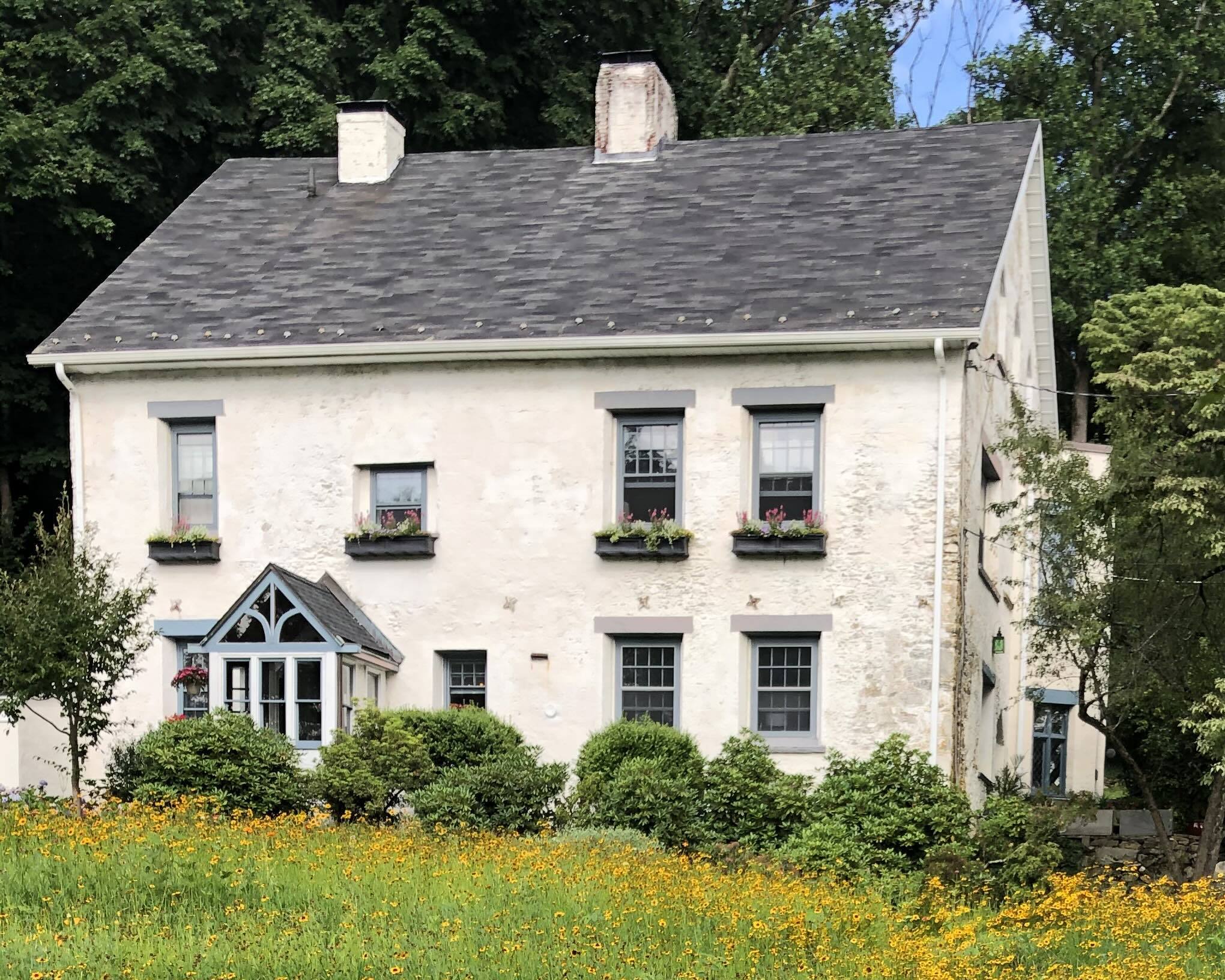
- Front view, 2020

- Location within New York Location within the United States
- Location: Chappaqua, NY
- Nearest city: White Plains
- Coordinates: 41°9′21″N 73°46′10″W
- Area: 1.8 acres (7,300 m^{2})
- Built: 1856
- Architect: Horace Greeley (original), Ralph Adams Cram (conversion)
- MPS: Horace Greeley TR
- NRHP reference No.: 79003214
- Added to NRHP: April 19, 1979

Rehoboth is a historic former barn located on Aldridge Road in Chappaqua, New York, United States. It is a concrete structure that has been renovated into a house with some Gothic Revival decorative elements. In 1979 it was listed on the National Register of Historic Places.

It was designed and built as a barn in the mid-19th century by newspaper editor and activist Horace Greeley as one of the agricultural experiments he dabbled in, testing whether concrete would make a good building material for farms. It was one of the first concrete structures in the country, and the first concrete barn. Greeley was so satisfied with the result he predicted that he would be remembered for it if nothing else.

Two decades after Greeley's death, his daughter Gabrielle and her husband, the Rev. Frank Clendenin, pastor of a New York City Episcopal church, commissioned architect Ralph Adams Cram to remodel it into their house, which Greeley named Rehoboth. They lived there for the rest of their lives, the remodeled house becoming one of the centers of Chappaqua's social life as the community completed its metamorphosis from country town to suburb. It has remained a private home since.

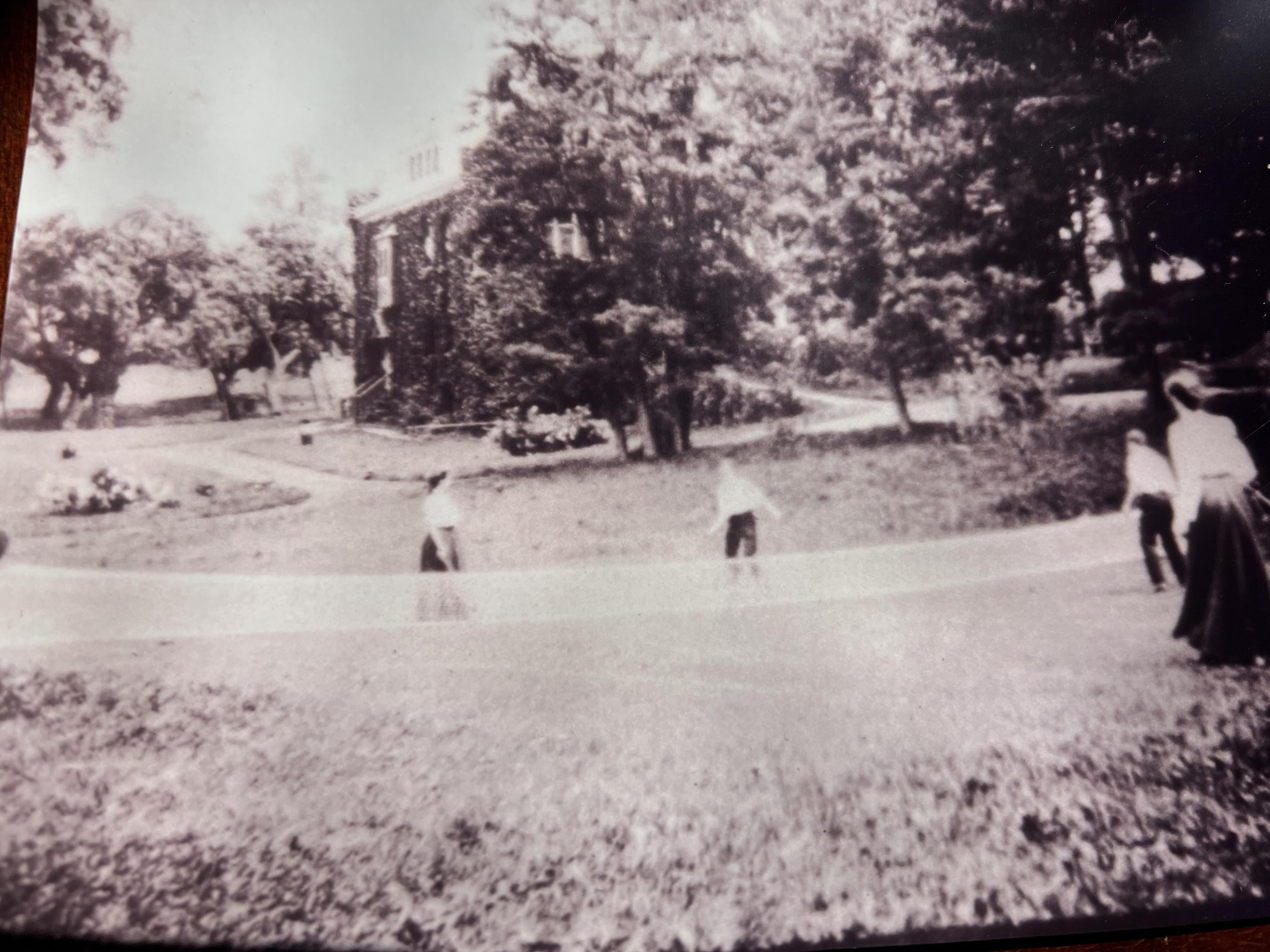
Lawn Tennis 1899

== Building ==
The house's 1.8-acre (7,300 m^{2}) lot is on the east side of Aldridge, a dead-end street, 600 feet (180 m) south of its intersection with Prospect Drive and Highland Avenue, both of which lead to King Street (New York State Route 120), the main road through Chappaqua. All the neighboring lots are of similar size, with more modern houses. Tall mature trees buffer them from neighboring properties.

Aldridge traverses a hill that rises steeply from the west, where downtown Chappaqua is located on one of the few level areas amid this generally hilly portion of Westchester County. To the east are similar residential lots on South Bedford Road (New York State Route 117). West, at the base of the hill, are Robert E. Bell Middle School and the Church of Saint Mary the Virgin, another Register-listed property that was built by the Greeleys in memory of a daughter who died in childhood.

The driveway begins south of the house, goes east then turns north towards a carport, then east again. The house itself is set further back than its neighbors, at an angle slightly offset to the east. It is a three-story structure of two-foot-thick (61 cm) load-bearing concrete walls topped with a steep gabled roof covered in shingles. Two chimneys pierce the roof. A small modern two-bay garage is attached to the north end. A two-story enclosed porch projects from the north end of the east (rear) facade.

Fenestration on the west (front) facade consists of three six-over-six double-hung sash windows on both stories, one near the north end and the other two closer to the south. They have plain sills and lintels. In the bay above the main entrance, on the second story, is an eight-over-eight double-hung sash window half the height of the others.

On the north and south facades there are two similar windows on the first and second stories, spaced closer on the lower floor. In the gable apex are three smaller pointed-arch windows. A metal ladder descends from the easternmost on the north facade. The south facade is similar but has a double window on the west side and a projecting two-story bay window on the east.

Just south of a single exposed basement window, wooden steps climb up to enter a projecting gabled vestibule from the north. It has four-over-four double-hung sash on all three sides, and glass in the west side of the gable. The entrance doors are in pointed arches.

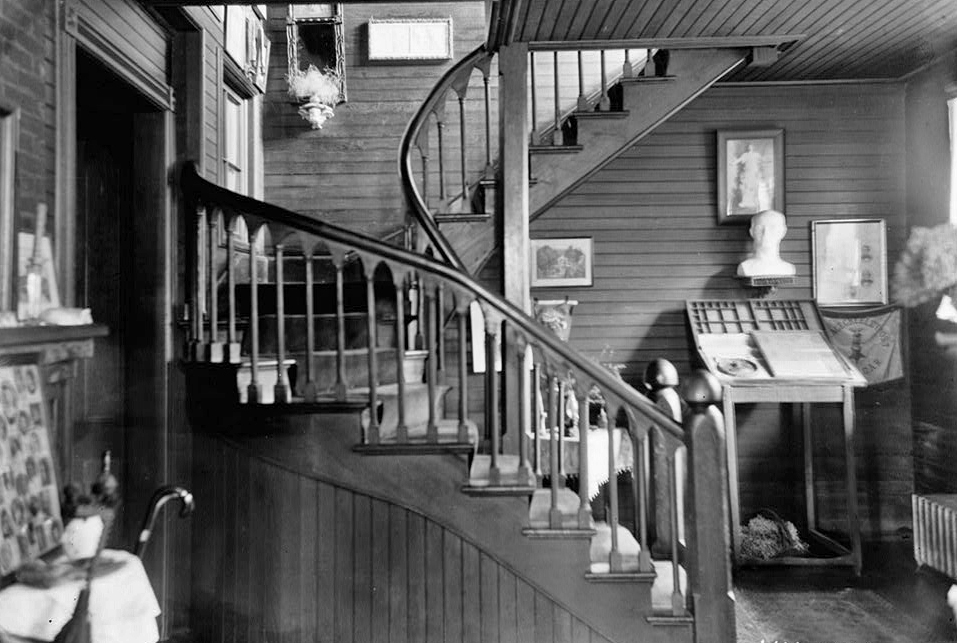
The staircase, photographed by the Historic American Buildings Survey (HABS). Circa 1902

They open into a large reception hall with tiled floor, and curving staircase. The pointed-arch motif is repeated in the door panels, banister spindles and on the chimney breasts of the fireplaces. The large living room has exposed beams on its 13-foot (4.0 m) ceilings and an exposed chimney.

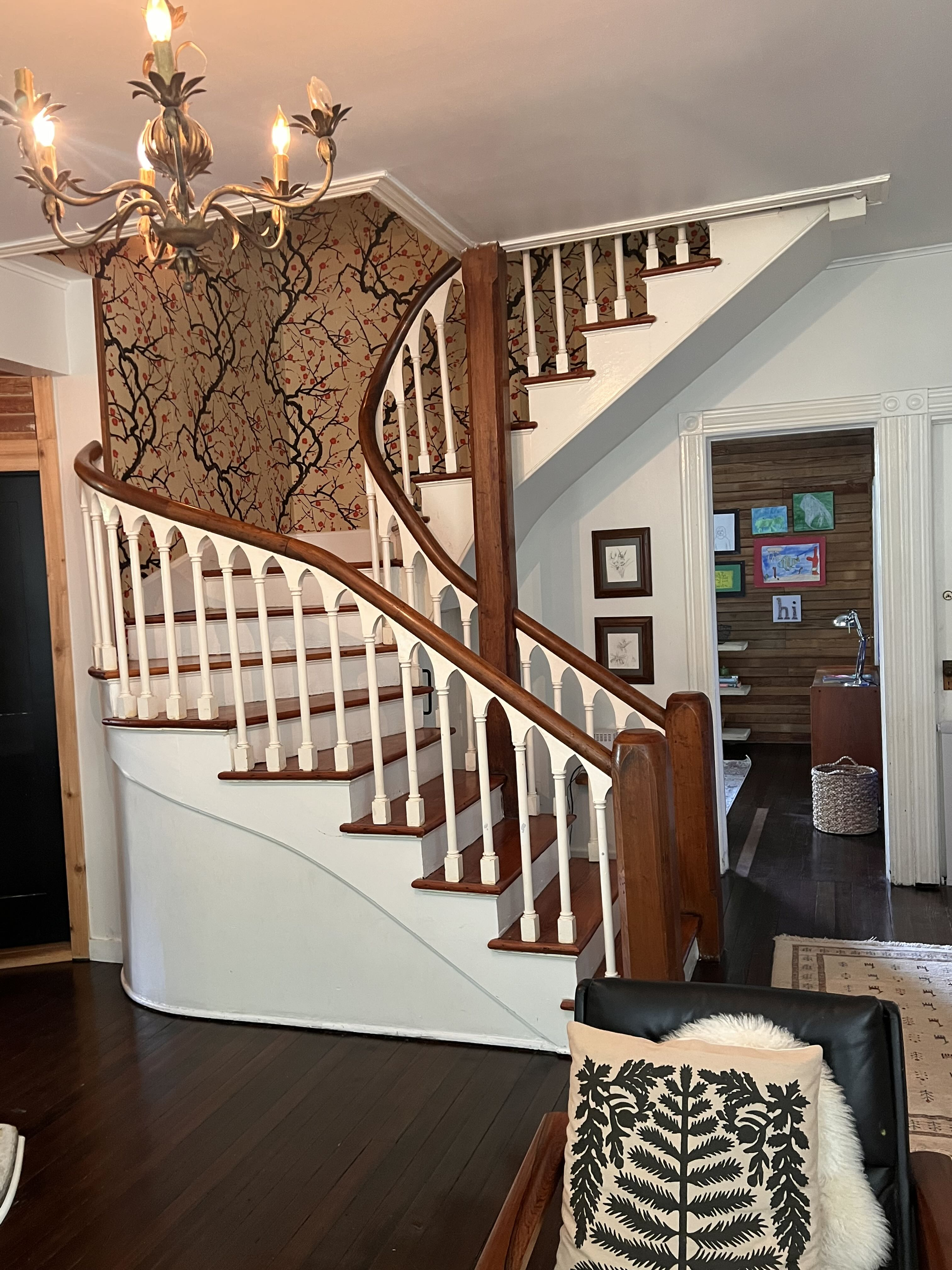
Staircase circa 2014

== History ==
In the early 1850s, Horace Greeley, editor of the New York Tribune and a former congressman, bought a house in Chappaqua near the New York and Harlem Railroad station. In addition to giving his family a quiet and cool place to escape the city during hot summers, he also bought some land in the vicinity to use as a small farm, where he tested experimental agricultural techniques he had become interested in. His weekly column in the paper on the results of these tests made the Tribune one of the most widely read papers in rural America at that time.

One prospect Greeley wanted to test was whether concrete would be a good material for ancillary farm buildings such as barns. At the time it was not known whether it would be able to withstand colder winters common in places like Chappaqua. Despite his lack of architectural experience, Greeley designed a dairy barn for his property. He took advantage of the slope of the land to construct a building with entrances on all three levels—the top for hay, the middle for cattle, and the ground floor for storage and waste removal. The model saved labor and money, and would be widely copied by others.

The barn became an attraction drawing visitors to Chappaqua from far away. Greeley was proud of it, and considered it his finest accomplishment. "I calculate that this barn will be abidingly useful," he wrote in his autobiography, "long after I shall have been utterly forgotten." It remained standing and sound after his death in 1872, following his unsuccessful run for president.

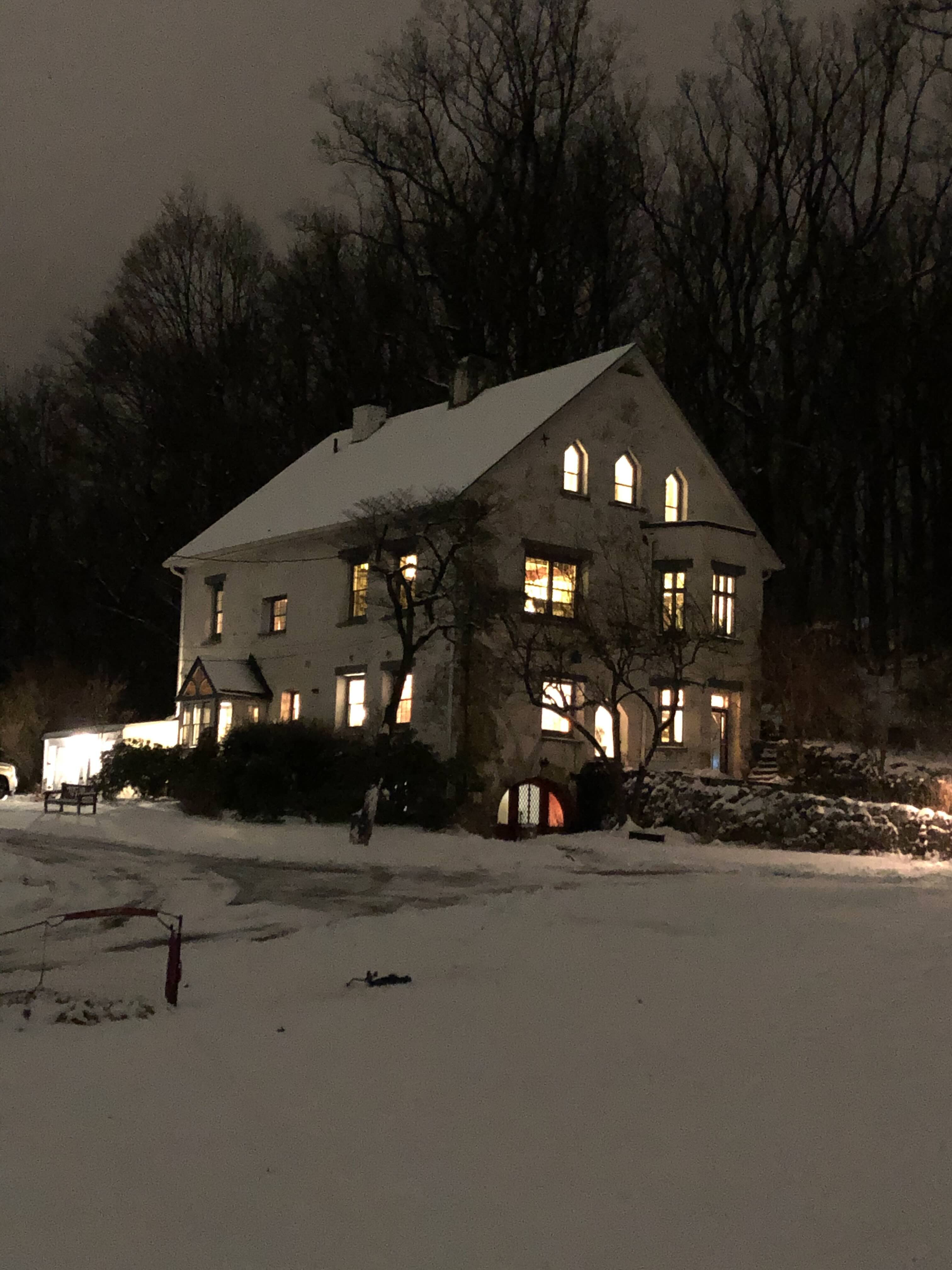
Circa 2019

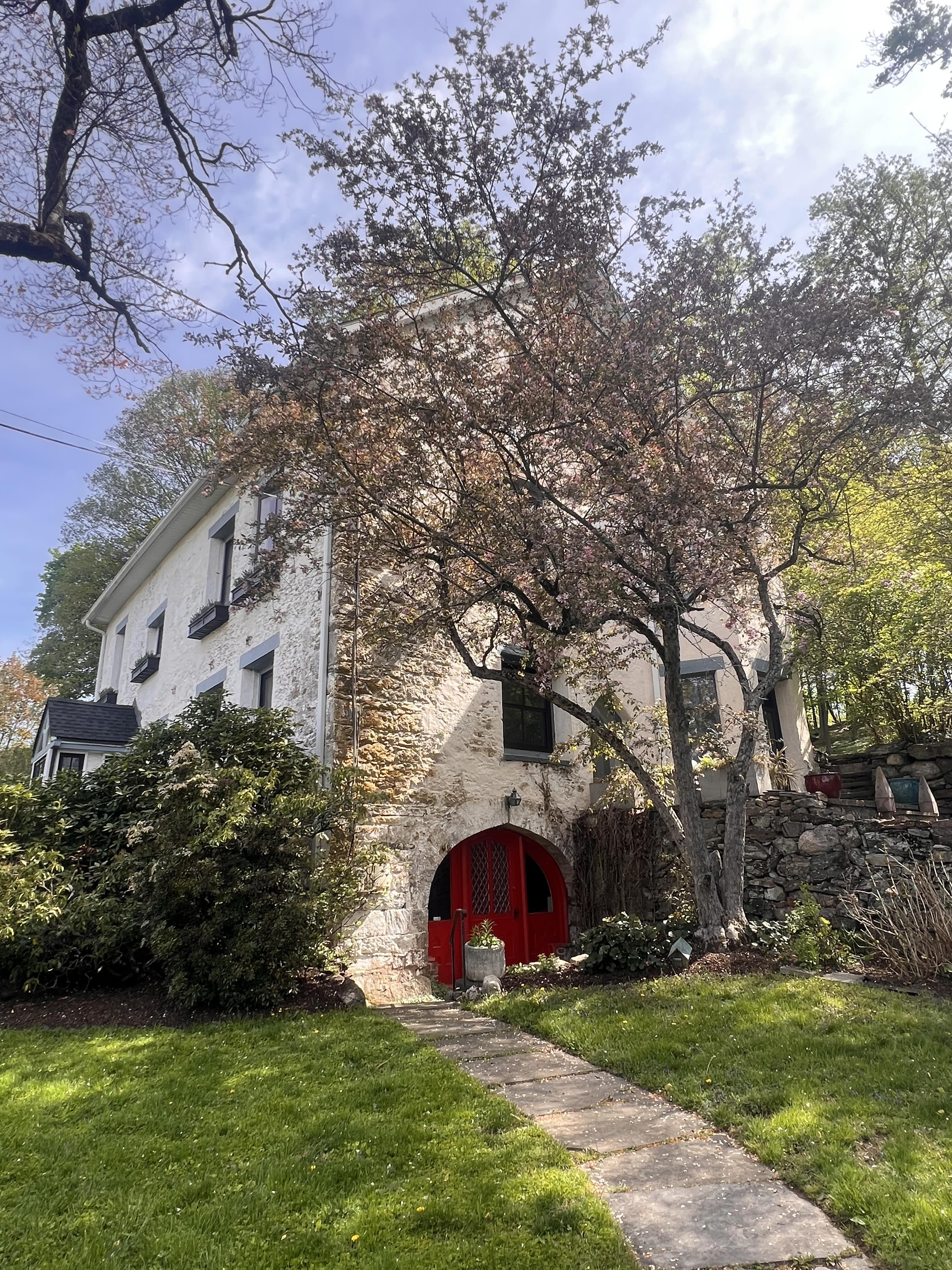
April 2026

Twenty years later, Greeley's daughter Gabrielle and her husband, the Rev. Frank Clendenin, who had (when in Chappaqua) been living in the family's old farmhouse in what is now downtown, decided to move. They commissioned architect Ralph Adams Cram, who at that time had just completed the Episcopal Cathedral of St. John the Divine in Manhattan, to remodel the barn into a house.

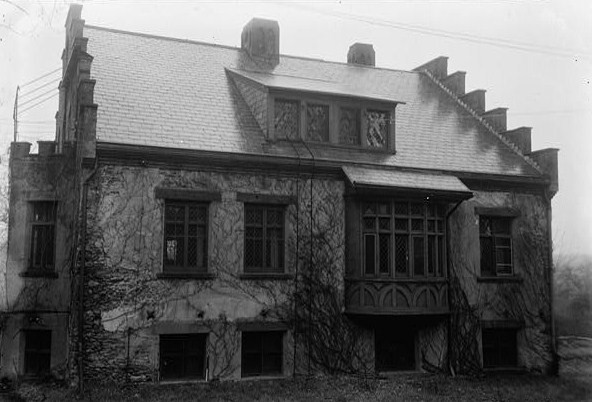
HABS photograph of Rehoboth as remodeled by Cram

On the exterior, his changes followed the neo-Gothic style of the church. He added a stepped gable and put shed dormer windows in the roof. He also added the pointed-arched attic windows, and applied the same motif to interior decor. Clendenin, pastor of another Manhattan Episcopal Church, St. Peter's, suggested the Biblical name "Rehoboth", meaning "wide open place" in Hebrew.

The Clendenins' move into the completed house mirrored the changes that were taking place in Chappaqua as a whole. The country town she had moved into with her family as a child was becoming a suburb, its farms being subdivided into homes for prosperous individuals who commuted by train to their jobs in the city, much as Gabrielle Greeley finally sold the remnant of her family farm to developers in the late 1920s who turned it into what is now downtown. Rehoboth, and especially its large ballroom, became the site of a number of important social events in the changing community, from dances and parties to political lectures and community meetings. The Clendenins lived there until their deaths in the 1930s.

In 1954, a later owner had the stepped gable and shed dormers removed, restoring to some extent the building's appearance when it had been a barn. At some point since its listing on the Register, the rear porch was added.

== See also ==
- Highland Cottage, first concrete house in Westchester County, built 1873
- National Register of Historic Places listings in northern Westchester County, New York
- William E. Ward House, first reinforced concrete structure built in the U.S., also in Westchester County
