= Chappaqua, New York =

Hamlet and census-designated place in New Castle, New York, US

- Hamlet and CDP
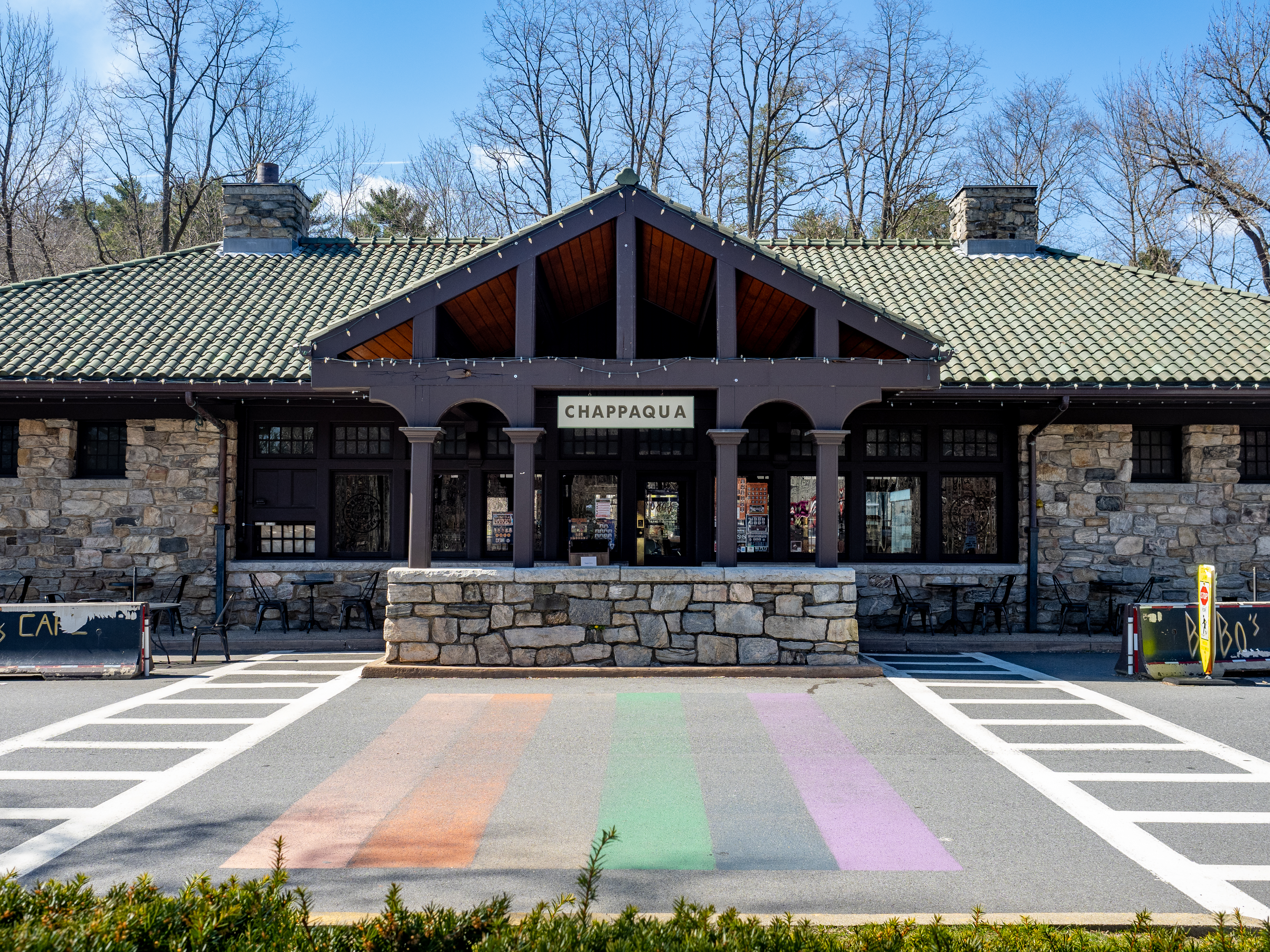
- Chappaqua Railroad Depot and Depot Plaza
- Etymology: Algonquian for "the rustling land"
- Location of Chappaqua, New York
- Coordinates (Downtown): 41°9′32″N 73°46′20″W
- Country: United States
- State: New York
- Region: Hudson Valley
- County: Westchester
- Town: New Castle
- Established: 1730s
- Seat: New Castle Town Hall; 41°9′19″N 73°46′28″W; 320 ft (98 m)

Government
  - Town Supervisor: Victoria Tipp
  - Town Board: Jeremy Saland (Deputy Supervisor); Alexandra Chemtob; Holly A.F. McCall; Jennifer Naparstek Klein

Area
  - Total: 0.92 sq mi (2.39 km^{2})
  - Land: 0.91 sq mi (2.35 km^{2})
  - Water: 0.015 sq mi (0.04 km^{2})
- Elevation: 330 ft (100 m)

Population (2020)
  - Total: 2,598
  - Density: 2,867.5/sq mi (1,107.16/km^{2})
- Time zone: UTC-5 (EST)
  - Summer (DST): UTC-4 (EDT)
- ZIP Code: 10514
- Area code: 914 (Exchange: 238)
- GNIS feature ID: 946393
- FIPS code: 36-13805
- River: Saw Mill
- Website: www.mynewcastle.org

Chappaqua (/ˈtʃæpəkwɑː/ CHAP-ə-kwah) is a hamlet and census-designated place in the town of New Castle, in northern Westchester County, New York, United States. It is approximately 30 miles (50 km) north of New York City. The hamlet is served by the Chappaqua station of the Metro-North Railroad's Harlem Line. As of the 2020 census, Chappaqua had a population of 2,598.

Chappaqua was founded by a group of Quakers in the 1730s and was the home of Horace Greeley, New-York Tribune editor and U.S. congressman. Chappaqua's high school is named after him.

== History ==
In the early 1730s, a group of Quakers moved north from Purchase, New York, to settle in present-day Chappaqua. They built their homes on Quaker Road (more recently, Greeley Avenue; Quaker Road still exists but becomes North and South Greeley Avenue in the town center) and held their meetings at the home of Abel Weeks. Their meeting house was built in 1753 and still holds weekly meetings each Sunday. The area around the meeting house, known as Old Chappaqua Historic District, was added to the National Register of Historic Places in 1974. Horace Greeley's home, known as Rehoboth and built by Greeley himself, still stands in Chappaqua. It is also listed on the National Register of Historic Places along with Chappaqua Railroad Depot and Depot Plaza, Church of Saint Mary the Virgin and Greeley Grove, and the Greeley House.

Various spellings were used for the name Native Americans gave to their valley and hillside. It was an Algonquian word, shah-pah-ka, and it meant "the rustling land" or "the rattling land," or a place where nothing is heard but the rustling of the wind in the leaves. The Quakers spelled it Shapiqua, Shapaqua, Shapequa, Shappaqua, and, finally, Chappaqua. Their meeting was often referred to as the Shapequa Meeting as early as 1745.

On March 18, 1791, the government of New York decided to split the overly large town of North Castle (jokingly called "the two saddlebags") into two smaller towns, one of which was named New Castle. The border was drawn from the southwest corner of Bedford to the northeast edge of Mount Pleasant. New Castle's borders have remained the same since 1791, except for a small piece of land received from Somers in 1846 and the secession of Mount Kisco in 1978.

Chappaqua had great streams such as the Saw Mill River and Roaring Brook. These bodies of water powered mills to crush corn and press oil from beans. The eastern half of Chappaqua was very suitable for farming. The majority of the Quaker settlers of Chappaqua were farmers. The popular farming industry also helped give way to Chappaqua's high milk production. Other popular industries from Chappaqua included shoes, hardware, vinegar, pickles, eyeglasses, and furniture. Many early homes and businesses were demolished in the 1904 Chappaqua tornado.

In 1846 when the New York and Harlem Railroad extended through Chappaqua, business became centered on the new train station. These businesses included a hotel, livery stables, a public library, and various stores and small factories. The railroad enabled commuters to travel to New York City and back each day.

== Geography ==
According to the 2020 U.S. census, Chappaqua has a total area of 0.45 square miles (1.2 km^{2}), all land. As delineated for the 2000 census, the CDP of Chappaqua covered a much greater area: 9.44 square miles (24.4 km^{2}), of which 9.38 square miles (24.3 km^{2}) was land and 0.06 square miles (0.16 km^{2}), or 0.64%, was water.

Parts of the Chappaqua ZIP Code area are located in the towns of Mount Kisco, New Castle, Mount Pleasant, Yorktown, and Bedford, and the hamlet of Millwood. Parts of the Chappaqua Central School District include homes in other zip codes, such as 10570, the Pleasantville zip code.

Chappaqua is accessible from the Saw Mill River Parkway, which runs through Westchester County.

=== Climate ===
Climate data for Chappaqua, New York
Month	Jan	Feb	Mar	Apr	May	Jun	Jul	Aug	Sep	Oct	Nov	Dec	Year
Record high °F (°C)	67 (19)	73 (23)	85 (29)	95 (35)	94 (34)	94 (34)	101 (38)	100 (38)	95 (35)	87 (31)	79 (26)	73 (23)	101 (38)
Mean daily maximum °F (°C)	34 (1)	37 (3)	46 (8)	58 (14)	69 (21)	77 (25)	82 (28)	80 (27)	73 (23)	62 (17)	50 (10)	39 (4)	59 (15)
Mean daily minimum °F (°C)	18 (−8)	19 (−7)	28 (−2)	38 (3)	49 (9)	58 (14)	63 (17)	61 (16)	53 (12)	42 (6)	34 (1)	24 (−4)	41 (5)
Record low °F (°C)	−15 (−26)	−10 (−23)	0 (−18)	14 (−10)	30 (−1)	38 (3)	46 (8)	39 (4)	32 (0)	20 (−7)	11 (−12)	−9 (−23)	−15 (−26)
Average precipitation inches (mm)	4.06 (103)	3.09 (78)	4.20 (107)	4.39 (112)	4.84 (123)	4.21 (107)	4.63 (118)	4.55 (116)	4.75 (121)	4.09 (104)	4.51 (115)	3.81 (97)	51.13 (1,299)

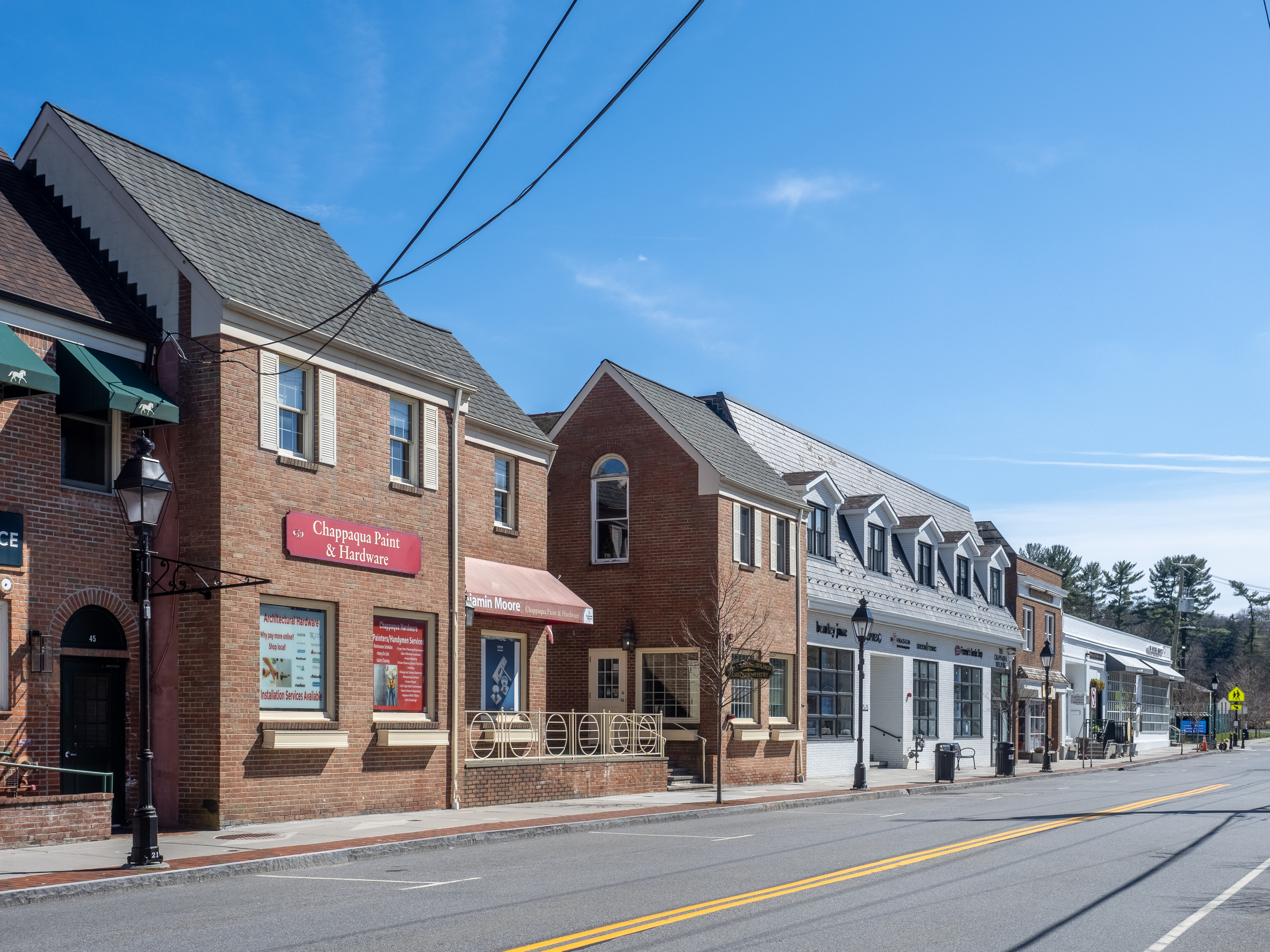
South Greeley Ave (2024)

== Demographics ==
Historical population
Census	Pop.	Note	%±
2020	2,598		—
U.S. Decennial Census

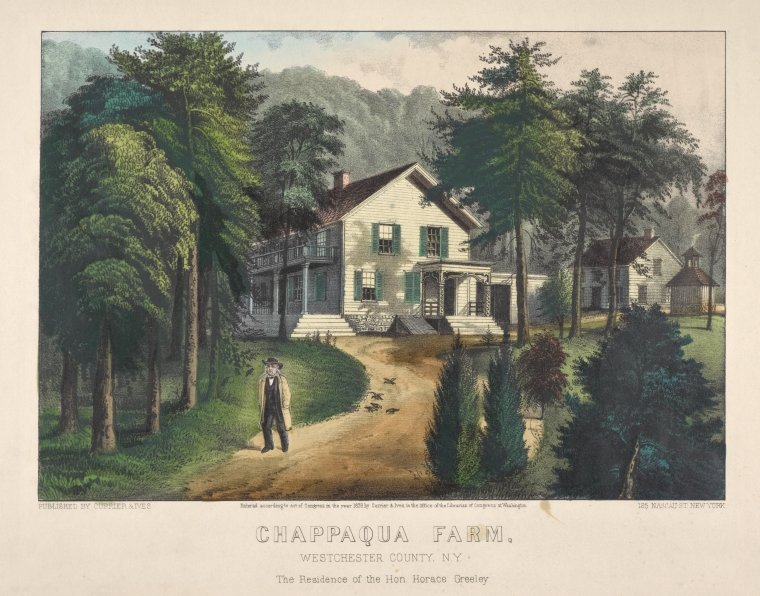
Chappaqua Farm, West Chester County, N.Y., The Residence of Hon. Horace Greeley, Currier & Ives, c. 1870

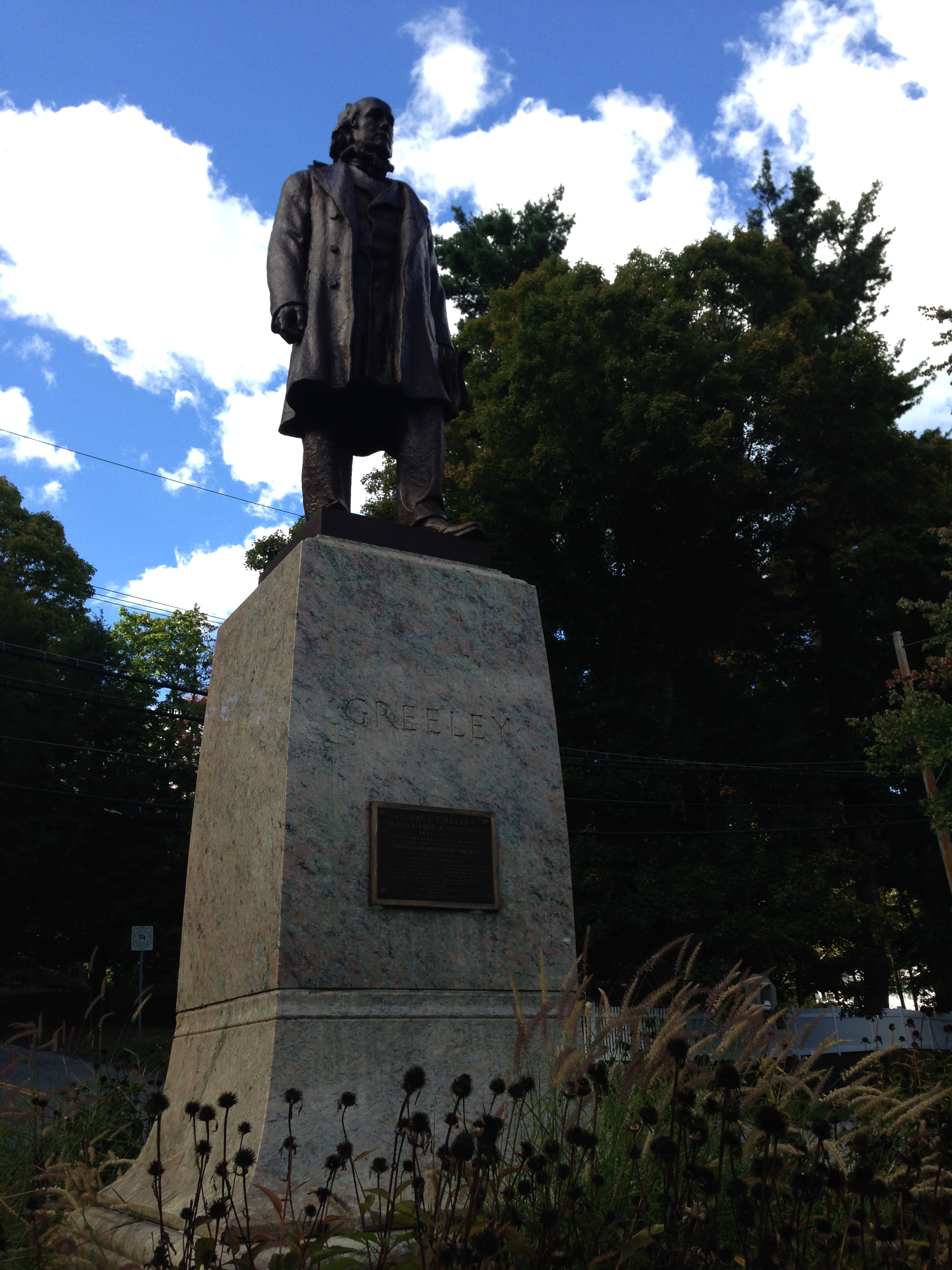
Statue of Horace Greeley in Chappaqua

Note the Chappaqua census-designated-place is different from the Hamlet of Chappaqua, which has a much higher population as part of the Town of New Castle.

=== 2020 census ===
As of the 2020 census, Chappaqua had a population of 2,598. The median age was 43.1 years. 23.7% of residents were under the age of 18 and 15.9% of residents were 65 years of age or older. For every 100 females there were 94.8 males, and for every 100 females age 18 and over there were 90.9 males age 18 and over.

100.0% of residents lived in urban areas, while 0.0% lived in rural areas.

There were 970 households in Chappaqua, of which 40.4% had children under the age of 18 living in them. Of all households, 65.7% were married-couple households, 8.7% were households with a male householder and no spouse or partner present, and 22.3% were households with a female householder and no spouse or partner present. About 18.4% of all households were made up of individuals and 9.5% had someone living alone who was 65 years of age or older.

There were 1,004 housing units, of which 3.4% were vacant. The homeowner vacancy rate was 1.4% and the rental vacancy rate was 3.1%.

Racial composition as of the 2020 census
Race	Number	Percent
White	1,783	68.6%
Black or African American	31	1.2%
American Indian and Alaska Native	0	0.0%
Asian	478	18.4%
Native Hawaiian and Other Pacific Islander	2	0.1%
Some other race	105	4.0%
Two or more races	199	7.7%
Hispanic or Latino (of any race)	203	7.8%

=== 2010 census ===
As of the 2010 census, following a major revision to the delineation of its boundaries by the Census Bureau, the population was 1,436.

According to the 2010 census, males had a median income of $207,083 versus $128,750 for females. 0% of families were below the poverty line. 6.6% of people old enough had a high school or equivalent degree of education, 5.8 had some college but no degree, 4% had an associate degree, 37.3% had a bachelor's degree, and 46.3% had a graduate or professional degree.

=== 2000 census ===
At the 2000 census, with very different census-defined boundaries, Chappaqua had a population of 9,468.

=== Demographic estimates ===
According to the 2015-2019 American Community Survey 5-Year Estimates, the median household income is $250,000+.

== Arts and culture ==
=== Notable structures ===
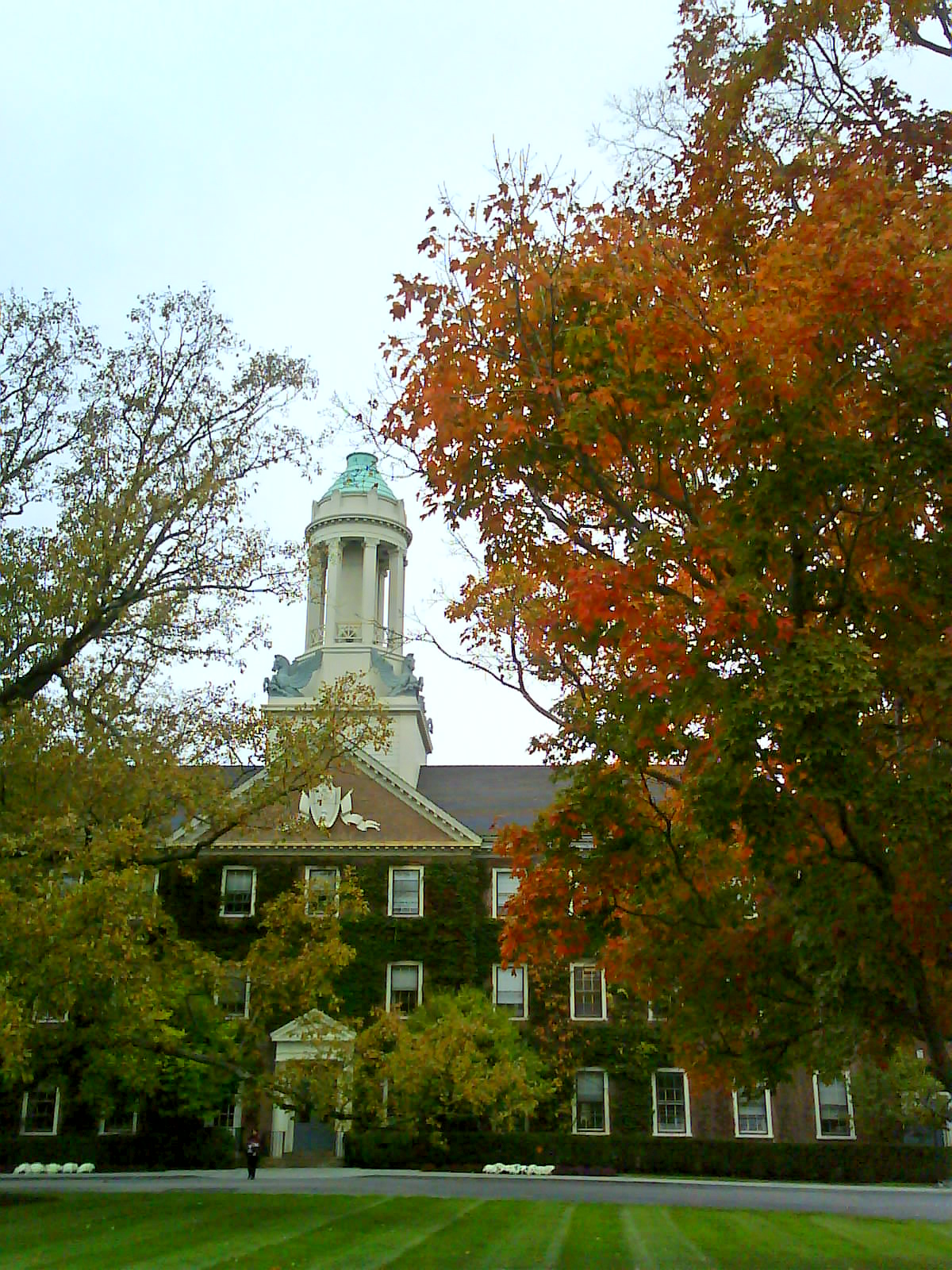
Reader's Digest headquarters at Chappaqua

- The international headquarters of Reader's Digest was in Chappaqua. The exterior featured statues of Pegasus.
- The Chappaqua Friends Meeting House, circa 1753, is the oldest extant Quaker meeting house in Westchester County, and is a contributing property to the Old Chappaqua Historic District.
- America's first concrete barn was completed by Horace Greeley on his Chappaqua farm in 1856. It was also one of the first concrete buildings ever built in the U.S. Greeley's daughter and son-in-law later remodeled it into their house and named it Rehoboth.
- Part of the original structure of one of Horace Greeley's homes is part of the present-day New Castle Historical Society.
- The Shamberg House, designed by Richard Meier, was built in Chappaqua in 1974.

A Georgian-inspired mansion in Chappaqua served as the shooting location for the 2022 horror film Bodies Bodies Bodies.

== Government ==
Chappaqua is within the New York State Assembly's 93rd district represented by Assemblyman Chris Burdick, and it's in the New York State Senate's 40th district represented by Senator Peter Harckham. The village is in New York's 17th District.

== Education ==
The Chappaqua Central School District includes the village. In 2024, Chappaqua Central School District had around 3.5 thousand students from grades K-12, above the national average.

Around 1928, Robert E. Bell Middle School, known at the time as Horace Greeley School, was built. The present day Horace Greeley High School was built in 1957. The three elementary schools in Chappaqua were completed over a twenty-year period: Roaring Brook School in 1951, Douglas G. Grafflin in 1962, and Westorchard in 1971.

In 2003, after the opening of the new middle school, Seven Bridges, and the moving of the fifth grade from Chappaqua's elementary schools to the middle schools, the district added a full day kindergarten.

Schools currently operating in Chappaqua include:

- Robert E. Bell MS
- Douglas Grafflin ES
- Seven Bridges MS
- Roaring Brook ES
- Horace Greeley High School
- Westorchard ES

=== History of Chappaqua schools ===
Small, one-room schoolhouses devoid of windows were prevalent in the 1800s. In the Chappaqua region, there were eight such schoolhouses. These small schools prevailed until around 1870, when the Quakers built a large school called the Chappaqua Mountain Institute on Quaker Street. In the year 1885 the school caught fire, and much refurbishing was done, with the addition of two new wings. It was sold in 1908 and the school's property is now owned by Children's Aid.

== Infrastructure ==
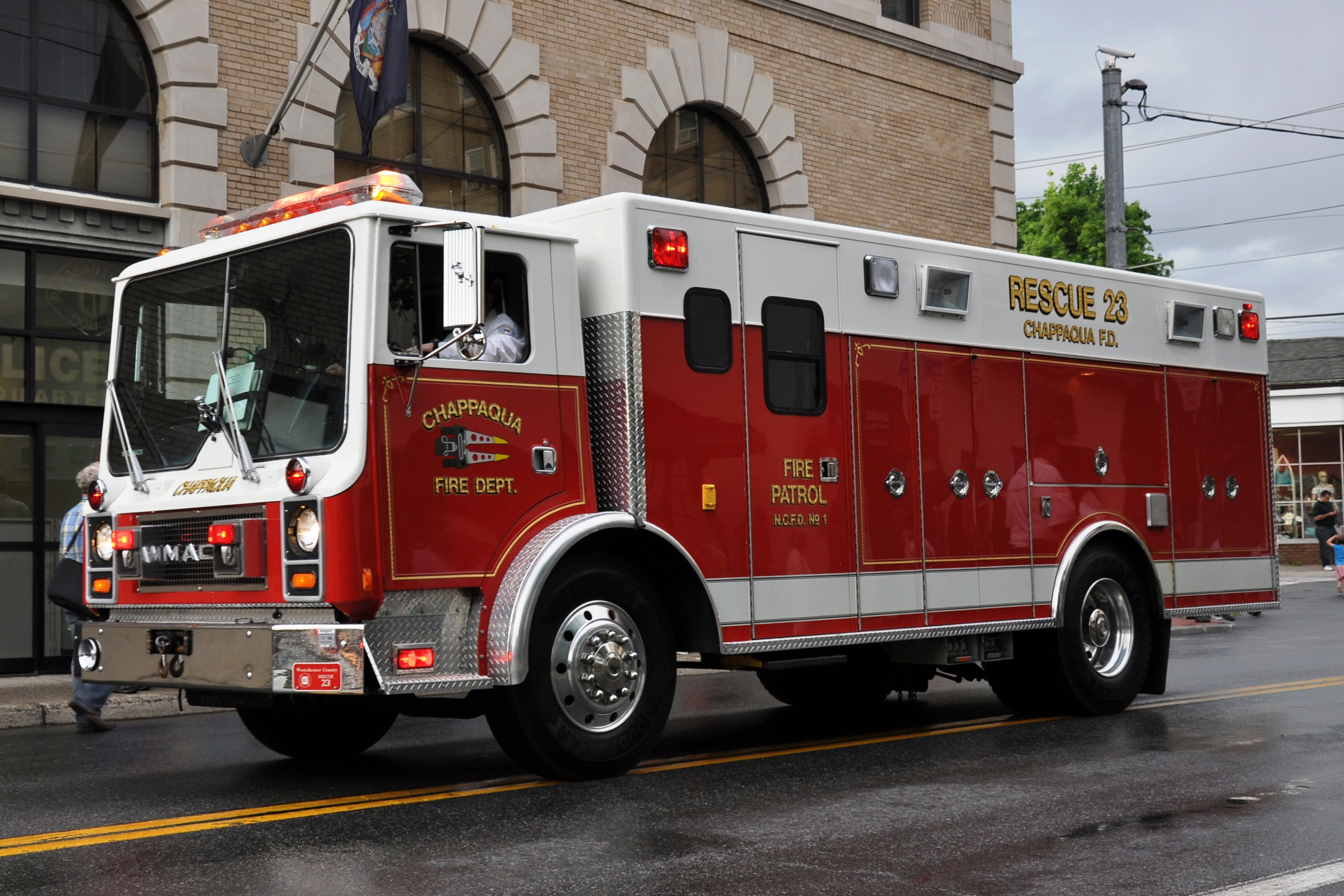

=== Emergency services ===
Emergency medical services and fire protection are provided by volunteer agencies. The Chappaqua Volunteer Ambulance Corps provides basic life support services to most of New Castle, including Chappaqua. Paramedic service is provided by Westchester EMS, a non-profit provider. The hamlet is protected by the New Castle Police Department, which also provides first-response services for medical emergencies. The volunteer-based Chappaqua Fire Department, established in 1910, provides firefighting services to the hamlet of Chappaqua. The fire department currently maintains two firehouses in Chappaqua.

== Notable people ==
- Bill Ackman, investor and CEO & Founder of Pershing Square Capital Management
- Adam Arkin, American television, film, and stage actor, son of Alan Arkin
- Alan Arkin, Academy Award-winning actor, best known for his roles in such films as The In-Laws, Catch-22, The Heart Is a Lonely Hunter, Wait Until Dark, Argo, and Little Miss Sunshine.
- Bibi Besch, actress
- Dave Bickler, lead singer of Survivor
- Dan Biederman, urban redevelopment expert
- Mark Bomback, screenwriter
- Tina L. Brozman, former Chief Justice of the Bankruptcy Court of the Southern District of New York
- Dan Bucatinsky, actor, producer, director, 2013 Primetime Emmy Award for Outstanding Guest Actor in a Drama Series as James Novak in Scandal.
- Bill and Hillary Clinton, former governor of Arkansas and U.S. president, and former first lady, U.S. senator, and United States Secretary of State. The Clintons purchased their home in Chappaqua for $1.7 million in 1999, near the end of Bill Clinton's presidency.
- Renee Cox, Jamaican-American artist, photographer, political activist, and curator
- Leo Esaki, a Japanese physicist, was living in the town when he won the Nobel Prize for Physics in 1973.
- Aerin Frankel, professional and Team USA ice hockey goaltender.
- Ace Frehley, lead guitarist of Kiss
- Eric Fromm, tennis player
- Jean Craighead George, author of children's novels My Side of the Mountain (set in the Catskills) and Julie of the Wolves
- Bob Giraldi, television and commercial director
- Earl G. Graves, Jr., former NBA player
- Horace Greeley, reformer, politician, editor of the newspaper New York Tribune. He came to Chappaqua to live in a rural area, so in 1853 he bought 78 acres (320,000 m^{2}) of land just east of the railroad. His land included upland pastures near present-day Aldridge Road, Greeley Hill, and the marshy fields now the site of the Bell Middle School fields and the shopping area along South Greeley Avenue.
- Nora Guthrie, daughter of Woody Guthrie and sister of Arlo Guthrie
- Roxanne Hart, American television, film and stage actress, appeared in Highlander, nurse on Chicago Hope among other roles. (Her father, Edward Hart, was principal of Horace Greeley High School)
- David Ho, prominent HIV/AIDS researcher
- Ian Hunter, singer and guitar player with the band Mott The Hoople.
- Mary Beth Hurt, actress
- Paul F. Iams, founder of the Iams pet food company
- Kenneth T. Jackson, American historian
- Stu Jackson, former NBA head coach and current senior vice president of the NBA
- Herman Kahn, Cold War military strategist
- Heather Paige Kent, actress, podcaster and reality TV personality
- Jonathan Klein, former president of CNN
- Peter Kunhardt, documentary film-maker
- Sandra Lee, host of Semi-Homemade Cooking with Sandra Lee, a show on the Food Network
- Brian Leiser, musician
- Paul Levitz, president of DC Comics
- Ferdinand Lundberg, author, journalist, economist
- Andrew McCabe, former acting director of the FBI
- William F. May, former chairman and chief executive of the American Can Company, co-founder of the Film Society of Lincoln Center.
- Richard McKelvey, noted political scientist and professor at California Institute of Technology
- Jordan Mechner, creator of Prince of Persia, also filmmaker
- Adam Mosseri, entrepreneur, head of Instagram
- Jacqueline Novak, comedian
- Daniel O'Keefe, Reader's Digest editor and inventor of the secular holiday Festivus. His son, Dan O'Keefe, popularized the holiday in 1997 by writing it into the plot of the television sitcom Seinfeld.
- Frank R. Pierson, screenwriter and film director
- Robert L. "Nob" Rauch, financier and flying disc sports executive
- Andy Rubin, technology pioneer (hand-held devices)
- Jay O. Sanders, American character actor
- Peter Saul, painter
- Paul Schrader, writer and director
- Michael Jeffrey Shapiro, composer and conductor
- John and Elizabeth Sherrill, Christian writers
- Ben Stiller, actor
- Bert Sugar, boxing historian
- Martin J. Sullivan, former president and former chief executive officer of American International Group, Inc.
- Rene Syler, journalist
- Christine Taylor, actress
- Jeff Van Gundy, former head coach of the Houston Rockets, former head coach of the New York Knicks
- Kevin Wade, screenwriter known best for Working Girl
- Dar Williams, singer-songwriter
- Vanessa Williams, Miss America 1984 beauty pageant, model, actress, singer
- Jenna Wolfe, sportscaster
