= Church of Saint Mary the Virgin (Chappaqua, New York) =

Historic church in New York, United States

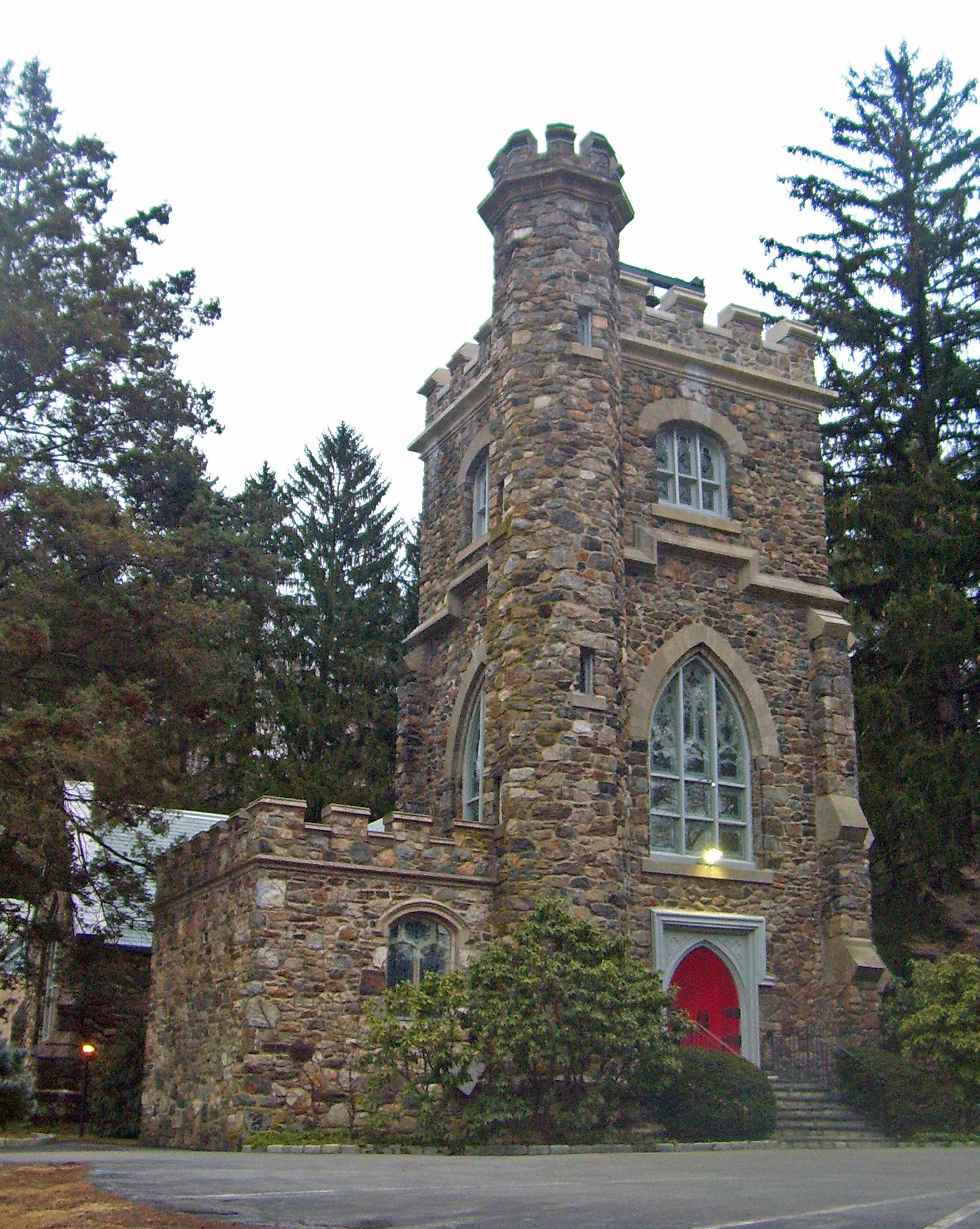
- West (front) elevation, 2009

Religion
- Affiliation: Episcopal Church
- Leadership: Fr. Joel Mason, rector
- Year consecrated: 1906

Location
- Location: Chappaqua, NY, USA
- Interactive map of Church of Saint Mary the Virgin
- Coordinates: 41°9′20″N 73°46′21″W

Architecture
- Architect: Morgan O'Brien.
- Type: chapel
- Style: Gothic Revival
- Groundbreaking: 1904
- Completed: 1904

Specifications
- Direction of façade: west
- Materials: stone

U.S. National Register of Historic Places
- Added to NRHP: April 19, 1979
- NRHP Reference no.: 79003213

Website
- The Church of Saint Mary the Virgin

The Church of Saint Mary the Virgin is an Episcopal church located on South Greeley Avenue in Chappaqua, New York, United States. The church reported 412 members in 2017 and 124 members in 2023; no membership statistics were reported nationally in 2024 parochial reports. Plate and pledge income reported for the congregation in 2024 was $283,611. Average Sunday attendance (ASA) in 2024 was 48 persons, up from a reported 18 in 2021.

The church was built in the early years of the 20th century on land donated by Horace Greeley's daughter Gabrielle and her husband, himself a priest of the Episcopal Church. In 1979 it was one of several properties associated with Greeley in Chappaqua listed on the National Register of Historic Places as the Church of Saint Mary Virgin and Greeley Grove.

Greeley, then editor of the New York Tribune, hosted a massive lunch and reception on the property during his 1872 campaign for President; he ran unsuccessfully as the first and only nominee of the Liberal Republican Party against eventual winner Ulysses S. Grant. Greeley had planted the large grove of evergreen trees 16 years earlier as a windbreak for his farm, part of his campaign to promote reforestation and conservation. After the election but before the counting of the electoral votes, Greeley died, and Gabrielle inherited the farm, which at the time covered most of what is now downtown Chappaqua.

When Gabrielle's daughter Muriel died in childhood in 1903, she and her husband, the Rev. Dr. Frank Clendenin, built the church as a private chapel. Architect Morgan O'Brien designed a stone Gothic Revival building that closely copied the 15th-century Church of Saint Mary the Virgin in Monken Hadley, England. Two years later, an original stained glass window from that church was given to the Chappaqua copy. In 1916 the Clendenins transferred it to the Diocese of New York, with some stipulations in the deed, among them that they and their children remain buried in a small plot at the rear of the church. It has since become a parish church; its annual Strawberry Festival is one of Chappaqua's most popular events.

== Buildings and grounds ==
The church is located just south of downtown Chappaqua, on a 4-acre (1.6 ha) parcel on the east side of South Greeley Avenue. It is in a level area along the headwaters of the Saw Mill River between the hills that otherwise dominate northern Westchester County. To its north is Robert E. Bell Middle School. Both buildings have large lawns on their deep setbacks from the street. Greeley Grove, with many evergreen trees over 150 feet (46 m) high, is to the south, east and some of the west. In the former direction it provides a buffer between the church and the more modern Chappaqua library; in the latter the ground rises sharply to residential property along Aldridge Road.

Across the street is a baseball diamond, providing open space between the church and the New Castle town hall to the southwest. Beyond it, and beyond the diamond's outfield fence, are the parking lots of the Chappaqua station on Metro-North Railroad's Harlem Line, whose tracks parallel both the Saw Mill River and eponymous parkway to their west. The old stone station building, currently used as a waiting area and café, is also listed on the Register along with the semicircular plaza across from it, which features a statue of Horace Greeley since his daughter and son-in-law also donated the land for the station.

From the middle school parking lot a driveway goes south to the church building. It is a cruciform-plan one-and-a-half-story fieldstone structure topped by a steeply pitched gabled roof covered in shingles. At the west (front) end is a three-story square tower with a round turret on its northwest corner. On its north side is a small one-story flat-roofed extension. A parish hall, with a gabled roof pierced by gabled dormer windows, is off to the northeast.

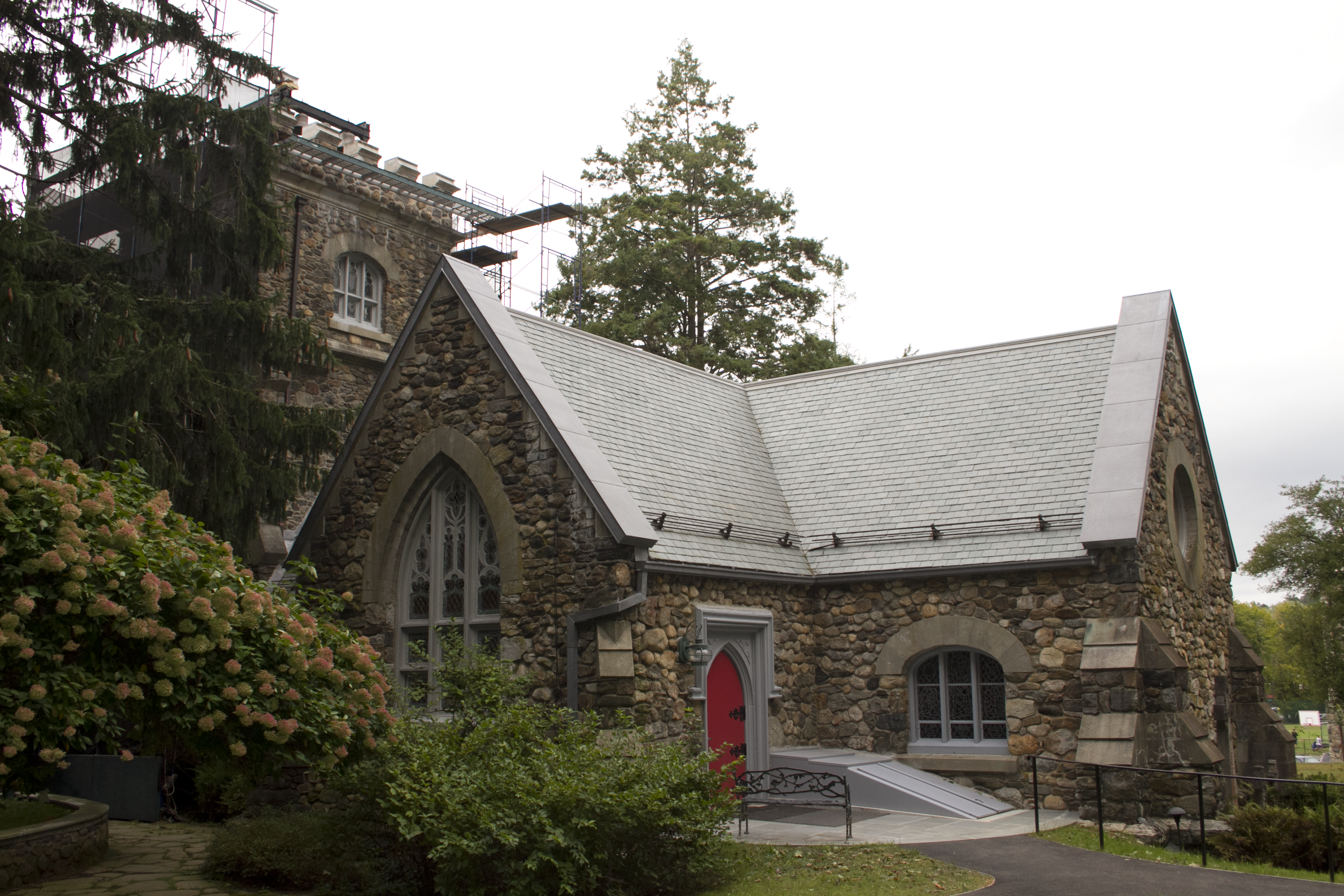
Rear view of church

The church's corners have stone buttresses, alternately smooth-faced and fieldstone. At the main and rear (east) end are entrances with a pointed-arched wooden door set in a gray square surround; a set of stone steps with iron railings lead to the main entrance from the driveway, flanked by rhododendrons and other trimmed shrubbery. Its windows are either round-arched or pointed-arched, with sills and lintels of smooth stone. The east end is set with a single round oculus. At the gables a low parapet marks the roofline.

On the tower, the buttresses rise two stories to a stone cornice, which separates the two stages. It has a slight rise above the pointed-arch window below corresponding to the width of the round-arched window above. Above that story, another cornice sets off the battlements at the roofline. The turret has two narrow windows. It, too, is topped by battlements but not divided into stages. The extension on the north wall also has battlements.

== History ==
From its settlement by Quakers in the early 18th century, Chappaqua had been a small self-sufficient farming community clustered around the meetinghouse, today at the center of the Register-listed Old Chappaqua Historic District a half-mile (800 m) north of downtown along King Street (New York State Route 120). The construction of the New York and Harlem Railroad through the area in the middle of the 19th century changed that. The farmers started growing cash crops for the New York City market newly available to them, and the city began coming to Chappaqua.

Its first commuter was Horace Greeley, editor of the New York Tribune. He saw a chance to distance himself from his professional life in the city and give his wife and daughter a quiet life in the country. In addition, he wanted to test out the experimental farming techniques he advocated in his column, widely read in much of rural America. One of them was the planting of the grove, which in addition to being visually appealing also fit in with his support for conservation and reforestation. By 1872, it had grown so large and impressive he held a large reception there in support of his candidacy for president that year on the Liberal Republican and Democratic lines.

He ultimately lost that year, as Ulysses S. Grant was re-elected. After the election but before the Electoral College voted, he died. His daughter Gabrielle inherited the family farm, which then consisted of 100 acres (40 ha) in what is now downtown Chappaqua.

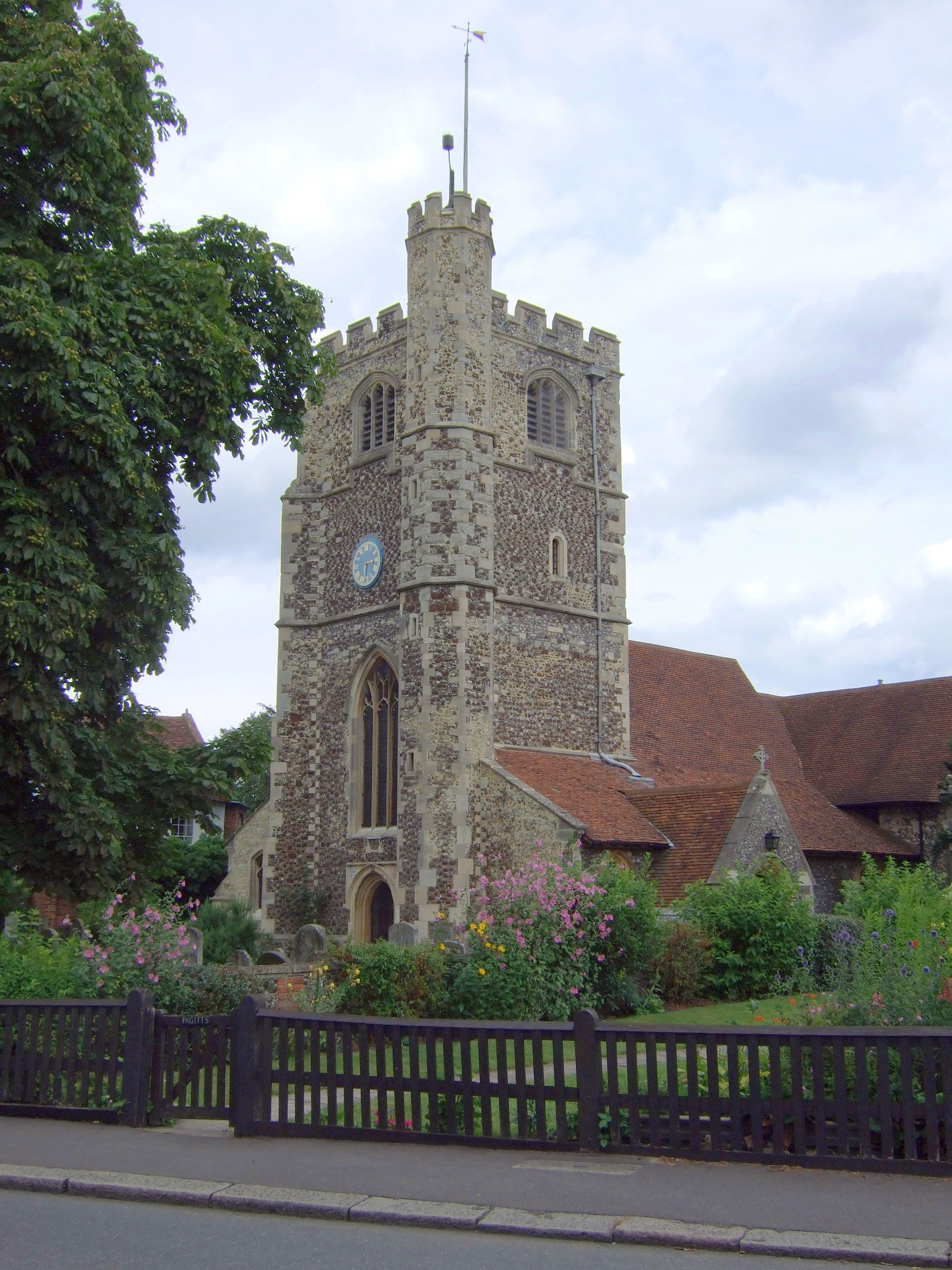
The original Church of Saint Mary the Virgin, in Monken Hadley, England

Later in the century Gabrielle and her husband, the Rev. Dr. Frank Clendenin, priest rector of St. Peter's Episcopal Church in the city, began subdividing the property. When their daughter Muriel died of polio in 1903 at the age of five, they commissioned a memorial chapel next to the grove Horace Greeley had planted. Architect Morgan O'Brien produced a Gothic Revival design that closely copied Saint Mary the Virgin Church, a parish church built in 1494 in Monken Hadley, England, on the outskirts of London. It was completed in 1904 and consecrated in 1906, with a stained glass window, now in the north transept, donated from the English church.

In 1913 the church became a mission church of the Episcopal Diocese of New York. Three years later, the Clendenins transferred title of the four-acre (1.6-ha) parcel to the Diocese. They made several stipulations:

- that the church would forever remain free,
- that it always be named Saint Mary the Virgin,
- that no mortgage or other legal or financial encumbrance be placed on the property, and
- the family retain the rights to a 20-by-12-foot (6.1 by 3.7 m) burial plot behind the church.

In the event the diocese failed to meet any of those conditions, ownership would revert to the Clendenins or any living heirs. They are still in force today; an heir, Gabrielle and Frank's grandson, lives in Germany.

Three years later, in 1919, a malfunctioning basement furnace caused a fire which did significant damage to the interior. In its aftermath several changes were made. Large screens and a baldachin which had closed off the transepts were never replaced. Instead a large pulpit was installed, with altar rails and prayer stalls lining the sanctuary. A carillon, dedicated to the memory of Alfred Smith Holland, a railroad executive close to the Clendenins, was added to the tower in 1924. The 10-bell carillon ring outs the Westminster Chimes every quarter hour.

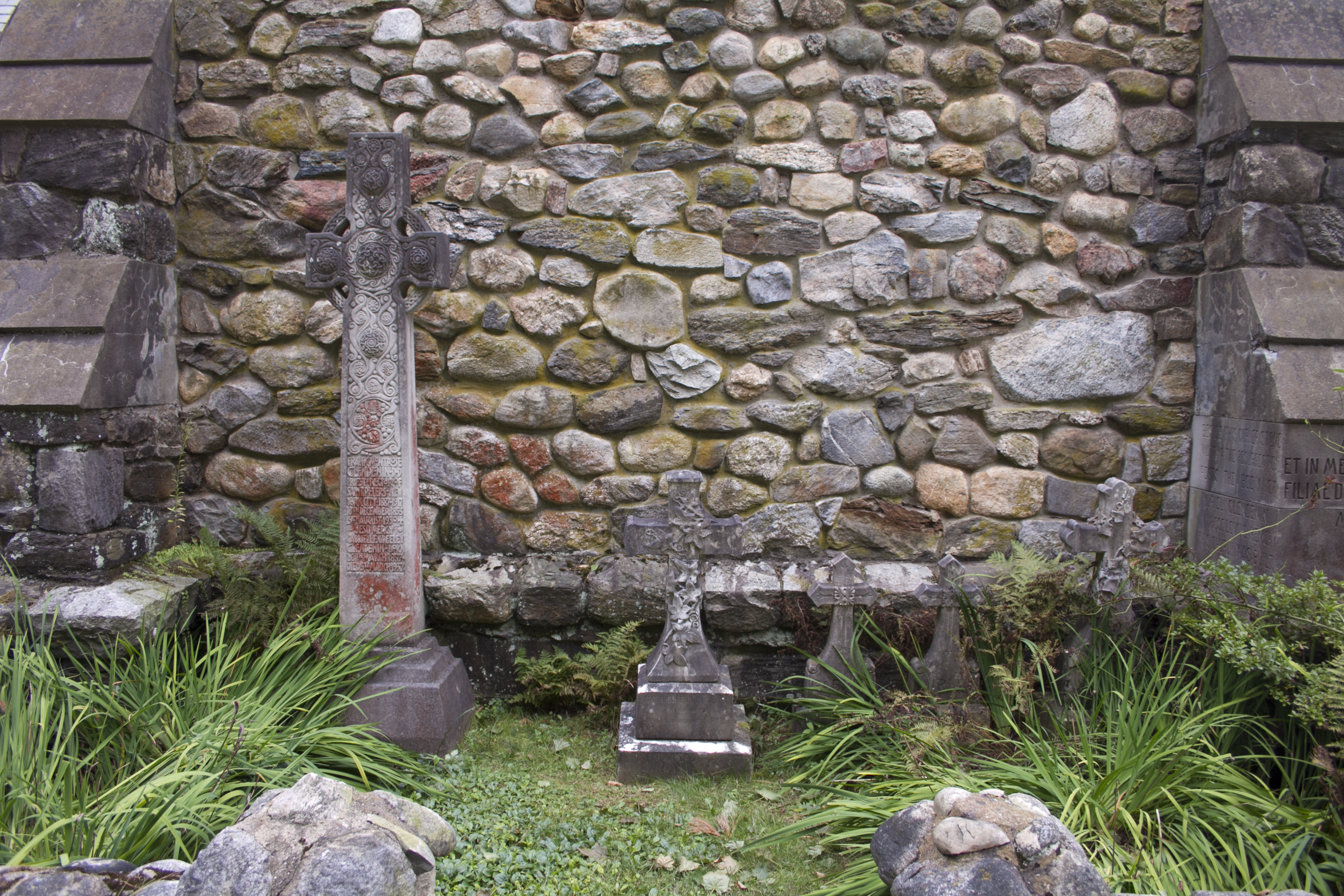
The Clendenin family plot behind the church

Frank Clendenin had retired from St. Peter's in 1917. Gabrielle Clendenin Stahl, another daughter, died three years later, in 1920. The family continued to worship at the church they had built through their deaths in the 1930s. The Clendenins and all four of their children are buried in the small plot they arranged for, per their stipulations with the diocese. Sometime later in that decade, the pulpit installed after the 1919 fire was removed.

In 1938 the church's women's auxiliary organized the first Strawberry Festival. It has been held ever since, featuring many events for children, including rides and walks through the paths of Greeley Grove. The following year it organized a social event for adults that also became an annual tradition, the Black Tie Dance. In 1943, the church was incorporated as a parish; the following year it was admitted into the diocese. The new parish took over the diocese's title to the property in 1949, with the Clendenins' stipulations remaining in effect.

As the only Episcopal church in Chappaqua, Saint Mary's needed to be able to serve the needs of its new parish. Construction began on the parish hall in the 1950s. The first floor was done in 1951 and the entire building was complete three years later. In 1955 a baptistry, copied from the original in Monken Hadley and made in England, was installed.

The church building remained unchanged, save for a replacement organ in the mid-1960s, until 1982. Renovations to the sanctuary that year removed the altar rails and prayer stalls installed after the fire over 60 years earlier. The masonry altar and altar stone were replaced with a freestanding altar and moved to the outdoors, where they were placed on the hillside.

== Programs and services ==
On Sunday mornings the church offers two services. The Holy Eucharist is performed using Rite I at the earlier time, and Rite II at the later. An extensive lay ministry assists the pastor, currently Father Joel Mason, with the ceremonies.

The church also has an extensive music program. A senior choir of adults performs at the later morning service every week, daily during Holy Week and four times a year during Evensong services. Its repertoire is mainly focused on traditional Anglican music, but also includes more modern work by Igor Stravinsky and John Tavener. The children's choir sings at services once a month. The religious music is supplemented by Ars Antiqua secular performances held three times a year at the church.

Every June, the church holds its annual Strawberry Festival, considered the longest-running community event of its kind in Westchester County, attracting visitors from all over the county. The main attraction is food prepared by the church's members based around the titular fruit, such as strawberry shortcake, strawberry pancakes, chocolate-covered strawberries and strawberry smoothies. Other traditional summertime festival fare, such as ice cream donated by Ben & Jerry's, hot dogs, hamburgers, popcorn and cotton candy, is also available. Craft vendors sell hand-made textile and wooden items. There are also attractions for children like bouncy houses, pony rides in the Grove, and face painting. Money raised by the festival goes to support the church's involvement in local charitable programs like food pantries.

== See also ==
- List of Episcopal churches
- National Register of Historic Places listings in northern Westchester County, New York
