= Robert E. Bell =

American archaeologist

Robert E. Bell (July 16, 1914 – January 1, 2006), was an archaeologist. He was a professor of anthropology at the University of Oklahoma from 1947 to 1980, and Curator of Archaeology at the Stovall Museum of Science and History at the University of Oklahoma (now the Sam Noble Oklahoma Museum of Natural History at the University of Oklahoma). He pioneered work on the Spiro Mounds archaeological site in eastern Oklahoma.

A Partial Bibliography of Dr. Robert E. Bell:

1947, Preliminary Report On the Archeological Activities Conducted By the Department of Anthropology in the Wister Reservoir Area In the Summer of 1947.

1947, Trade Materials at Spiro Mound As Indicated By Artifacts. American Antiquity 12: 181–184.

1948, Recent Archeological Research in Oklahoma. Bulletin of Texas Archeological and Paleontological Society 19: 148–154.

1949, Recent Archaeological Research in Oklahoma. Chronicles of Oklahoma 27: 303–312.

1949, Archaeological Excavations at the Harlan Site, Fort Gibson Reservoir, Cherokee County, Oklahoma. Plains Archaeological Conference Newsletter. 3 (1): 3–15. & Fay-Cooper Cole, John Bennett, Joseph R. Caldwell, Norman Emerson, Richard S. MacNeish, Kenneth Orr, Roger Willis 1951, Kincaid: a Prehistoric Illinois Metropolis. Chicago, IL: The University of Chicago Press.

& David A. Baerreis 1951, Survey of Oklahoma Archaeology. Bulletin of Texas Archeological & Paleontological Society 22: 7–100.

& Richard H. Fraser 1952, Archaeological Discoveries at the Morris Site, Cherokee County, Oklahoma. In: Chronicles of Oklahoma 30 (2).

1952, Discovery Near Terlton, Oklahoma. Oklahoma Anthropological Society Newsletter 1 (3): 3–4.

1952, Field Trip To Kay County, Oklahoma. Oklahoma Anthropological Society Newsletter 1 (6): 1–2.

1952, Human Skeleton Discovered Near Terlton, Oklahoma. Oklahoma Anthropological Society Newsletter 1 (2): 4–6.

& Roland Scott Hall 1953, Selected Projectile Point Types of the United States. Bulletin of the Oklahoma Anthropological Society 1:1-16.

1953, Report On the Oklahoma Anthropological Society Field Trip. Oklahoma Anthropological Society Newsletter 2 (2).

& Charlene Dale 1953, Morris Site, (34CK39), Cherokee County, Oklahoma. Bulletin of The Texas Archaeological Society 24: 69–140.

1953, Scott Site, Leflore County, Oklahoma. American Antiquity 18 (4): 314–331.

1953, Pottery Vessels from the Spiro Mound, C-1, Leflore County, Oklahoma. Bulletin of The Oklahoma Anthropological Society 1: 25–38.

1954, Projectile Points in West-Central Oklahoma: Dan Base Collection. Bulletin of The Oklahoma Anthropological Society 2: 11–18.

1954, Bulletin of the Oklahoma Anthropological Society, Volume II. Oklahoma Anthropological Society.

& Karl Schmitt 1954, Historic Indian Pottery from Oklahoma. Bulletin of The Oklahoma Anthropological Society 2: 19–34.

1954, Projectile Points from West-Central Oklahoma: Dan Base Collection. Bulletin of the Oklahoma Anthropological Society, Volume II. Oklahoma Anthropological Society 11–18.

1954, Excavations at Lake Texoma, Marshall County, Oklahoma. Oklahoma Anthropological Society Newsletter 3 (3): 2–3.

1956, Copper Plummet from Poverty Point, Louisiana. American Antiquity 22: 80-80.

1957, Clear Fork Gouges Found in Oklahoma. Bulletin of The Texas Archaeological Society 28: 285–288.

1957, Comments Upon the OAS Dig. Oklahoma Anthropological Society Newsletter 6 (6): 4–5.

1958, Archaeological Investigations at the Boat Dock Site (34MA1) in the Lake Texoma Area, Marshall County, Oklahoma. Bulletin of The Oklahoma Anthropological Society. 6: 38–47.

1958, Guide to the Identification of Certain American Indian Projectile Points. Oklahoma Anthropological Society, Special Bulletin, No.1. Oklahoma City.

1958, Radiocarbon Dates from Oklahoma. Oklahoma Anthropological Society Newsletter 7 (3): 3-3.

1959, Radiocarbon Dates from Oklahoma Sites. Oklahoma Anthropological Society Newsletter 8 (4).

1960, Evidence of a Fluted Point Tradition in Ecuador. American Antiquity 26(1):102-106.

1960, Guide to the Identification of Certain American Indian Projectile Points. Oklahoma Anthropological Society, Special Bulletin, No.2. Oklahoma City.

& E. Mott Davis 1961, Caddoan Area: An Introduction To the Symposium. In: Relationships Between the Caddoan Area and the Plains pp. 3–10.

1961, Relationships Between the Caddoan Area and the Plains. Bulletin of The Texas Archaeological Society 31: 51–64.

1961, Relationships Between the Caddoan Area and the Plains, With Discussions By D.A. Baerreis, M.F. Kivett & R.L. Stephenson. In: Relationships Between the Caddoan Area and the Plains pp. 53–64.

1961, 1960 Excavations at the McLemore Site (34WA5), Western Oklahoma. In: Plains Anthropologist 6 (12): 62–63.

1961, Some Recent Radiocarbon Dates for Oklahoma. Oklahoma Anthropological Society Newsletter 9 (5): 4-4.

1962, Precolumbian Prairie Settlement in the Great Plains. South Dakota Museum 2 (1): 22–28.

1963, Agee Points. Oklahoma Anthropological Society Newsletter 11 (8): 1–3.

& George Garrett Huffman, Tyson A. Cathey, James E. Humphrey 1963, Prehistory. In: Guide to the State parks and Scenic Areas in the Oklahoma Ozarks pp. 24–26: University of Oklahoma.

1963, The Fred Loomis Site: a Small Group Burial Near Freedom, Oklahoma. Bulletin of The Oklahoma Anthropological Society 11: 123–128.

1963, Some New Radiocarbon Dates from Oklahoma. Oklahoma Anthropological Society Newsletter 11 (9): 3-3.

& James A. Brown 1964, First Annual Report of Caddoan Archaeology, Spiro Focus Research. Norman, OK: University of Oklahoma Research Institute.

& Hester R. Davis 1966, Field Reports at 8th Caddo Conference (1965). Oklahoma, Harlan Site. In: Caddoan Area Field Reports, 1962-1964 Seasons. pp. 42–57: University of Arkansas Museum.

& Edward B. Jelks & W.W. Newcomb 1967, A Pilot Study of Wichita Indian Archaeology and Ethnohistory. National Science Foundation, Grant GS-964. Dallas: Southern Methodist University.

1968, Dating the Prehistory of Oklahoma. South Dakota Museum 7 (2): 42–50.

1968, Archaeological Sites in Oklahoma. Oklahoma Anthropological Society Newsletter. 16 (7): 8–9.

& et al. 1969, The Robinson-Solesbee Site, (34HS9), a Fulton Aspect Occupation, Robert S. Kerr Reservoir, Eastern Oklahoma. Archaeological Site Report #1. Norman: Oklahoma River Basin Survey.

1971, Guide to the Identification of Certain American Indian Projectile Points. A four book set, spiral bound composed of Special Bulletins. Volume 1 (1958, Bell), 2 (1960, Bell), 3 (1968, Perino) and 4 (1971, Perino), Published by Oklahoma Anthropological Society.

1971, Bison Scapula Skin-Dressing Tools. Plains Anthropologist. 16 (52): 125–127.

1972, Harlan Site (34CK6), a Prehistoric Mound Center in Cherokee County, Eastern Oklahoma. Oklahoma Anthropological Society Memoir #1, Norman: Oklahoma Anthropological Society.

1972, The Harlan Site, (34CK6), A Prehistoric Mound Center in Cherokee County, Eastern Oklahoma. Memoir #2, Oklahoma Anthropological Society, Norman.

1973, Washita River Focus of the Southern Plains. In: Variation in Anthropology. Springfield: Illinois Archaeological Survey.

1974, Report on burials found at Crenshaw Mound C, Miller Co., AR. Bulletin of the Oklahoma Anthropological Society, Volume XXIII (23). Oklahoma Anthropological Society.

1974, Mounds and Fieldwork Near Muskogee, Oklahoma. Robert E. Bell. Oklahoma Anthropological Society Newsletter 22 (8): 6–9.

1975, Oases Volunteers Help With Test Work in Noble County. Oklahoma Anthropological Society Newsletter 23 (6): 6–11.

1977, Obsidian Hydration Studies in Highland Ecuador. American Antiquity 42: 68–78.

1978, Oklahoma Archaeology: An Annotated Bibliography. Norman: University of Oklahoma Press.

1979, Canton Reservoir Western Oklahoma. Oklahoma Anthropological Society Newsletter 27 (3): 7–9.

1979, Ferdinandina: Biography of a French-Indian Trading Community On the Southern Plains. (tDAR id: 136352)

1980, Archeological Survey of Mack Oil Company's Well #4 Frazier, Carter County. (tDAR id: 98971)

1980, Fourche Maline: An Archaeological Manifestation in Eastern Oklahoma. Louisiana Archaeology.

1980, Oklahoma Indian Artifacts: Contributions From the Stovall Museum. University of Oklahoma, No. 4. Norman.

& John L. Gibson 1980, Fourche Maline: An Archeological Manifestation in Eastern Oklahoma. In: Caddoan and Poverty Point Archeology: Essays in Honor of C. H. Webb. pp. 83–125.

1981, Radiocarbon Dates from Archaeological Sites in Oklahoma. Bulletin of The Oklahoma Anthropological Society 9: 77–80.

1981, Wichita Indians and the French Trade On the Oklahoma Frontier: 1719–1757. Bulletin of The Oklahoma Anthropological Society 30: 11–17.

& Christopher R. Lintz, Leon George Zabawa 1984, Kenton Caves of Western Oklahoma. In: Prehistory of Oklahoma pp. 161–174: Academic Press.

& Larry D. Banks 1984, Lithic Resources and Quarries. In: Prehistory of Oklahoma pp. 65–95: Academic Press.

& Marshall Gettys 1984, Early Specialized Hunters. In: Prehistory of Oklahoma pp. 97–108: Academic Press.

& Don G. Wyckoff 1984, Foragers: Eastern Oklahoma. In: Prehistory of Oklahoma pp. 119–160: Academic Press.

& David T. Hughes 1984, Foragers: Western Oklahoma. In: Prehistory of Oklahoma. pp. 109–117: Academic Press.

& Susan C. Vehik 1984, Woodland Occupations. In: Prehistory of Oklahoma pp. 175–197: Academic Press.

& Jack L. Hofman 1984, Western Protohistoric: a Summary of the Edwards and Wheeler Complexes. In: Prehistory of Oklahoma pp. 347–362: Academic Press.

& Lois El Albert 1984, Survey of Archaeological Activity in Oklahoma. In Prehistory of Oklahoma pp. 45–63: Academic Press.

& Charles L. Rohrbaugh 1984, Arkansas Valley Caddoan: Fort Coffee and Neosho Foci. In: Prehistory of Oklahoma. pp. 265–285: Academic Press.

& James A. Brown 1984, Arkansas Valley Caddoan: the Spiro Phase. In: Prehistory of Oklahoma. pp. 241–263: Academic Press.

& Jerry R. Galm 1984, Arkansas Valley Caddoan Formative: the Wister and Fourche Maline Phases. In: Prehistory of Oklahoma. pp. 199–219: Academic Press.

& Christopher R. Lintz 1984, Plains Villagers: Antelope Creek. In: Prehistory of Oklahoma pp. 325–346: Academic Press.

& Jack L. Hofman 1984, Plains Villagers: the Custer Phase. In: Prehistory of Oklahoma pp. 287–305: Academic Press.

& Lois E. Albert, Don G. Wyckoff 1984, Oklahoma Environments: Past and Present. In: Prehistory of Oklahoma pp. 1–43: Academic Press.

1984, Arkansas Valley Caddoan: the Harlan Phase. In: Prehistory of Oklahoma. pp. 221–240: Academic Press.

1984, Protohistoric Wichita. In: Prehistory of Oklahoma pp. 363–378: Academic Press.

1984, Prehistory of Oklahoma. Edited by Robert E. Bell, Academic Press, Inc. New York

1984, Plains Villagers: the Washita River. In: Prehistory of Oklahoma, edited by Robert E. Bell. Academic Press, New York.

& Robert L. Brooks 2001, Plains Village Tradition: Southern. Handbook of North American Indians, Plains, 13:207-221.Smithsonian Institution, Washington.
