= St. Peter's Episcopal Church (Manhattan) =

Church in Manhattan, New York

Coordinates: 40°44′39″N 74°00′06″W

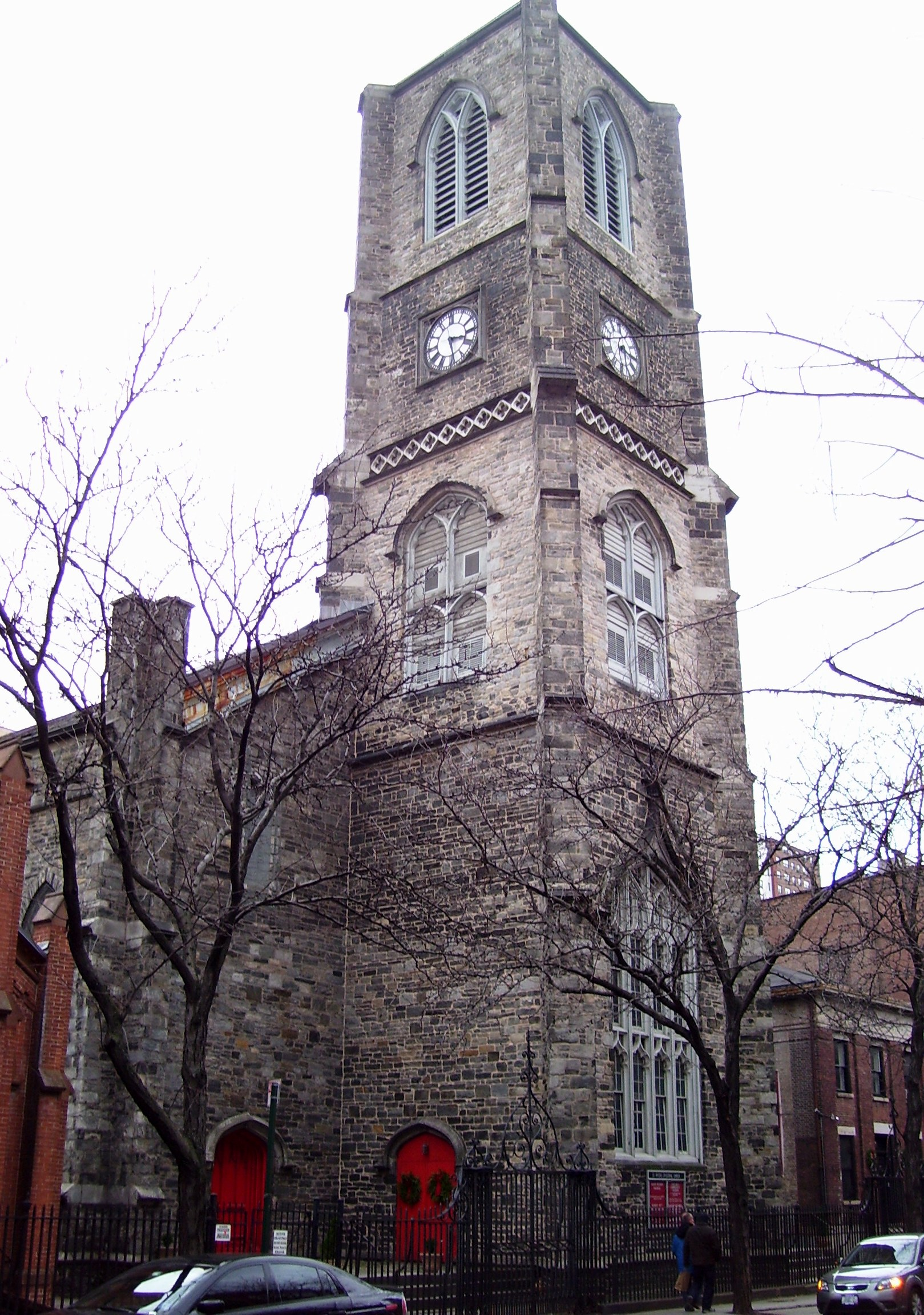
View of the church from the east

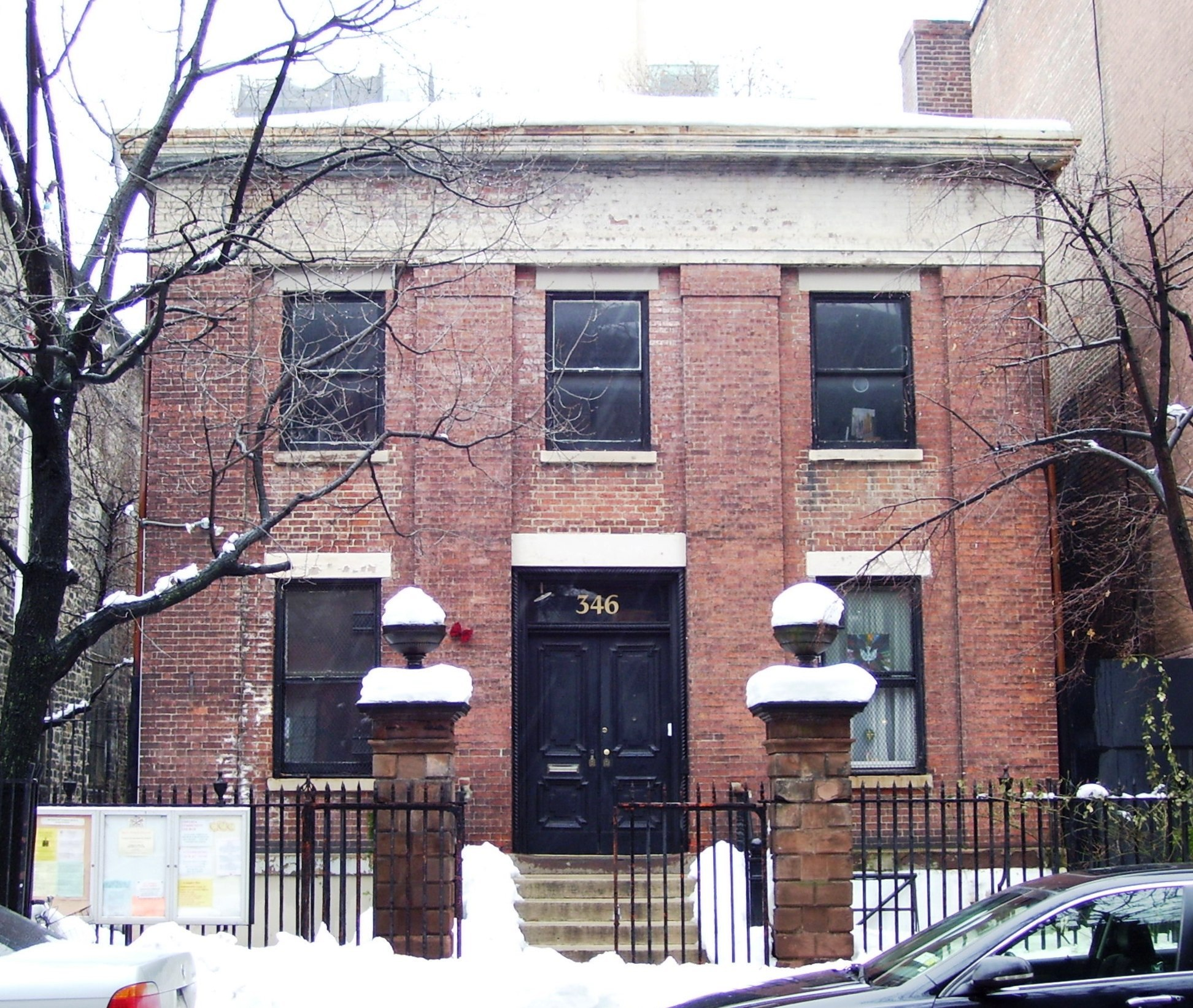
The rectory was the parish's original chapel

St. Peter's Episcopal Church, Chelsea, familiarly known as St. Peter's Chelsea, is a historic church of the Episcopal Diocese of New York at 346 West 20th Street between Eighth and Ninth Avenues in the Chelsea neighborhood of Manhattan, New York City, began as an outgrowth from the nearby General Theological Seminary, which had been founded in 1827. After some years in which local residents joined students and faculty from the Seminary for services, it became clear than a new, separate congregation was necessary, and this was organized on May 9, 1831.

Clement Clarke Moore, whose estate "Chelsea" gave the name to the neighborhood, and who donated the land of his apple orchard for the Seminary to be built on, leased land to the new congregation – which he later deeded to it. He became an active member of the St. Peter's congregation: at various times he was a warden, a vestryman, and the church organist. A Greek Revival-style chapel was built which was consecrated on February 4, 1831. Five years later, builder James W. Smith began constructing the present Gothic Revival church from designs made by Moore, and this present church building was consecrated on February 22, 1838; the chapel became the church's rectory.

The wrought-iron fence in front of the church is older than the church and the rectory. It dates from c.1790, and was originally part of the second incarnation of Trinity Church, the primary and oldest Episcopal congregation in New York City at the time. It was moved to St. Peter's sometime in the 1830s. The clock in the church's bell tower was installed in 1888, and it operated without interruption until April 1949, when a hand on one of its faces broke loose.

The third building in the complex is the East Hall, which was constructed beginning in 1854 and had a church-like facade added in 1871. It is now used by the Atlantic Theatre Company as their mainstage, the Linda Gross Theatre. The entire church complex is part of the Chelsea Historic District, which was designated by the New York City Landmarks Preservation Commission in 1970 and extended in 1981.

The church reported 67 members in 2015 and 148 members in 2023; no membership statistics were reported in 2024 parochial reports. Plate and pledge income reported for the congregation in 2024 was $499,135 with average Sunday attendance (ASA) of 74 persons.

St. Peter's also hosts services for the Chelsea Community Church, a non-denominational Christian church.
