= List of Friends meeting houses =

Numerous Friends meeting houses are individually notable, either for their congregations or events or for architecture of their historic buildings. Some in the United Kingdom are registered as listed buildings, and in the United States are listed on the National Register of Historic Places.

== Australia ==
- Friends Meeting House, Adelaide (1840)

== France ==
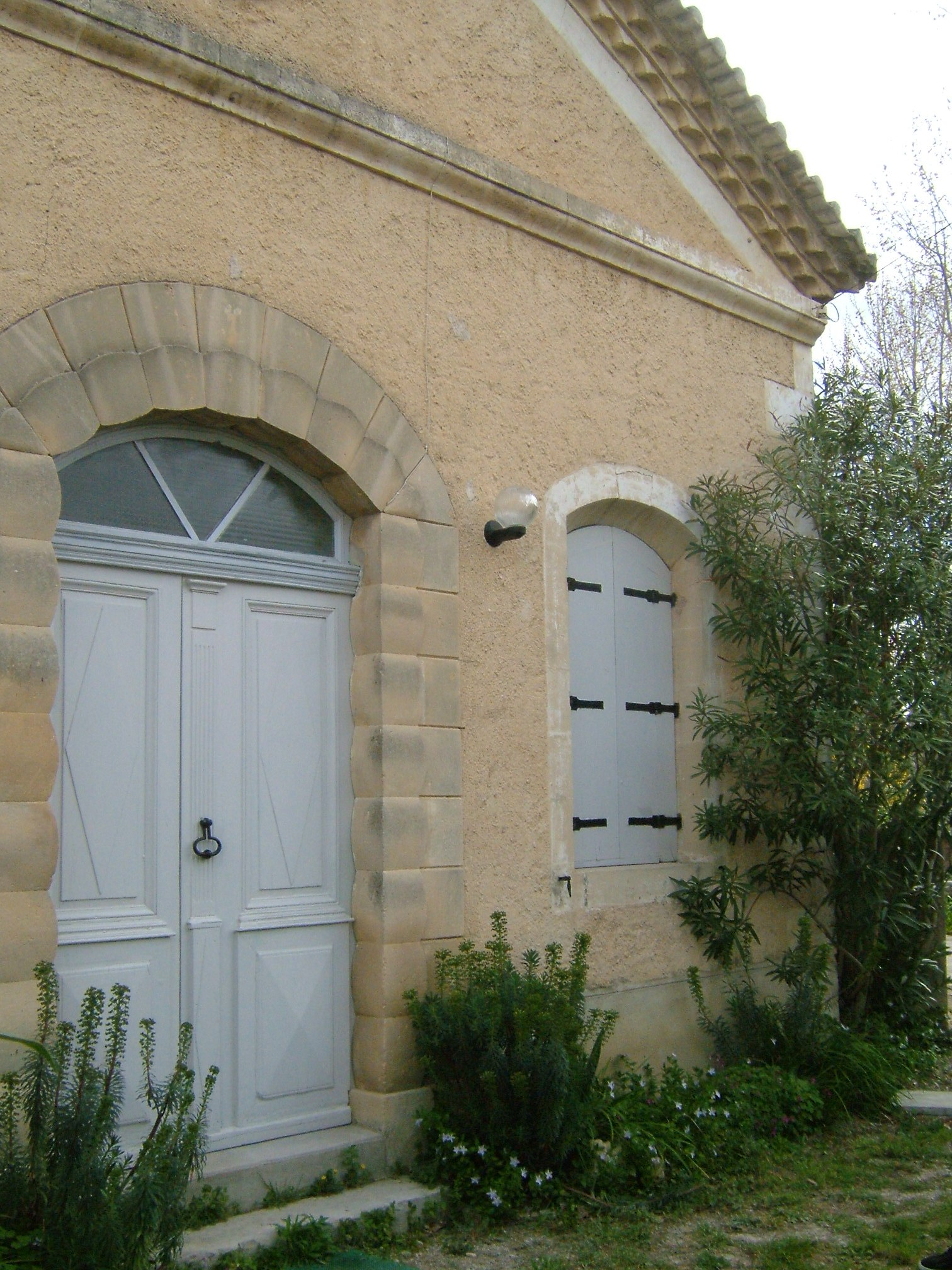
Meeting house, Congénies

- Meeting house, Congénies

== United Kingdom ==
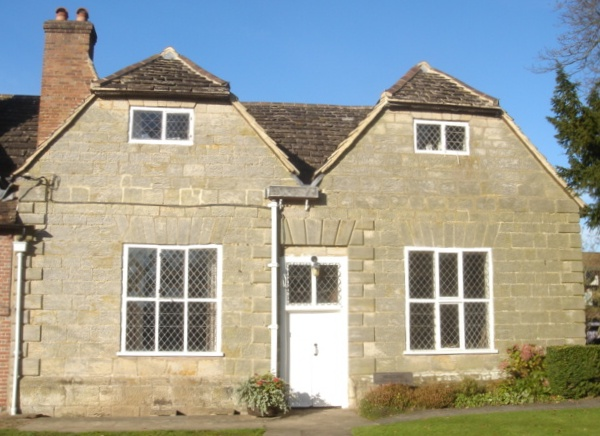
Ifield Friends Meeting House, one of the oldest purpose-built Quaker buildings in the world

Britain Yearly Meeting is the organization of Quakers in England, Scotland, Wales, the Isle of Man, and the Channel Islands. Several meeting houses have been listed for their architectural merit.

- Adderbury Meeting House, Oxfordshire, listed Grade II*
- Amersham Meeting House (1689), Buckinghamshire, listed Grade II*
- Blackheath Quaker Meeting House (1972), London, listed Grade II
- Briggflatts Meeting House (1675), Cumbria, second oldest in England
- Brighton Friends Meeting House (1805), East Sussex
- Finchley Meeting House (1967), London
- Friends Meeting House, Come-to-Good (1710), Cornwall
- Hertford Meeting House (1670), Hertfordshire, oldest in the world still in use
- Horsham Friends Meeting House, West Sussex, listed Grade II
- Ifield Friends Meeting House (1676), West Sussex, listed Grade I
- Jordans Meeting House (1688), Buckinghamshire
- Friends Meeting House, Lancaster (1708), Lancashire
- Leek Quaker Meeting (1848), Staffordshire
- Lewes Friends Meeting House, East Sussex, listed Grade II
- Littlehampton Friends Meeting House, West Sussex, listed Grade II
- Osmotherley Friends Meeting House (1723), North Yorkshire, listed Grade II
- Stafford Quaker Meeting (1730), Staffordshire, a listed building
- Uttoxeter and Burton Quaker Meeting (1706), Staffordshire
- Warwick Meeting House, Warwickshire, listed Grade II*

=== Former meeting houses ===
Several meeting houses are no longer in use by Friends, but are still listed buildings:

- Brandeston Meeting House, Suffolk, listed Grade II
- Brigstock House, Northamptonshire, listed Grade II
- Quakers Friars, Bristol, listed Grade I
- Farfield Friends Meeting House (1689), West Yorkshire
- The Old Meeting House, Wymondham, Norfolk (1687) Grade II

== United States ==
=== Delaware ===
- Appoquinimink Friends Meetinghouse, Odessa
- Camden Friends Meetinghouse, Camden, Kent County
- Centre Meeting and Schoolhouse, Centerville
- Friends Meetinghouse, Wilmington, (part of Quaker Hill Historic District)
- Hockessin Friends Meetinghouse, Hockessin, New Castle County
- Mill Creek Friends Meetinghouse, Newark, New Castle County

=== Florida ===
- Miami Friends Meeting, Miami
- Orlando Friends Meeting, Orlando
- Winter Park Friends Meeting, Winter Park

=== Illinois ===
- Benjaminville Friends Meeting House and Burial Ground, McLean County

=== Iowa ===
- Coal Creek Friends' Meetinghouse, Mahaska County Historical Society/Nelson Pioneer Farm & Museum, Oskaloosa, Iowa
- Honey Creek Friends' Meetinghouse, New Providence

=== Kentucky ===
- Berea Friends Meeting, Berea

=== Maine ===
- Friends Meetinghouse, Casco
- Maple Grove Friends Church, Fort Fairfield
- River Meetinghouse, Vassalsboro

=== Maryland ===
- Bethesda Meeting House, Bethesda, Montgomery County
- Colora Meetinghouse, Colora, Cecil County
- Deer Creek Friends Meetinghouse, Darlington, Harford County
- East Nottingham Friends Meetinghouse, Rising Sun, Cecil County, (also known as Brick Meetinghouse)
- Little Falls Meetinghouse, Fallston, Harford County
- Neck Meetinghouse and Yard, West Denton, Caroline County
- Old Town Friends' Meetinghouse, Baltimore, (also known as Aisquith Street Meeting, Baltimore Meeting or Patapsco)
- Pipe Creek Friends Meetinghouse, Union Bridge
- Sandy Spring Friends Meetinghouse, Sandy Spring
- Third Haven Meeting House, Easton, Talbot County
- West Nottingham Meetinghouse, Rising Sun, Cecil County

=== Massachusetts ===
- Amesbury Friends Meeting House, Amesbury, Essex County
- Apponegansett Meeting House, Dartmouth, Bristol County
- East Blackstone Friends Meetinghouse, Blackstone, Worcester County
- East Hoosac Quaker Meeting House, Adams, Berkshire County
- Long Plain Friends Meetinghouse, Acushnet, Bristol County
- Pembroke Friends Meetinghouse, Pembroke, Plymouth County
- Salem Friends Meeting House, Salem, Essex County, (relocated to grounds of Peabody Essex Museum)
- Uxbridge Friends Meeting House, Uxbridge, Worcester County

=== Michigan ===
- Raisin Valley Friends Meetinghouse, Adrian Charter, Lenawee County

=== New Hampshire ===
- Dover Friends Meetinghouse, Dover, Strafford County
- North Sandwich Meeting House, North Sandwich, Carroll County

=== New Jersey ===
- Alloways Creek Friends Meetinghouse, Hancock's Bridge, Salem County
- Arney's Mount Friends Meetinghouse and Burial Ground, Burlington County
- Atlantic City Area Monthly Meeting, Atlantic County
- Barnegat Monthly Meeting, Ocean County
- Cropwell Friends Meeting House, Cropwell, Burlington County
- Crosswicks Friends Meeting House, Crosswicks, Burlington County
- Evesham Friends Meeting House, Mount Laurel, Burlington County
- Haddonfield Friends Meeting House, Haddonfield, Camden County
- Little Egg Harbor Friends Meeting House, Tuckerton, Ocean County
- Moorestown Friends School and Meetinghouse, Moorestown
- Newton Friends' Meetinghouse, Camden
- Quakertown Friends Meeting House, Quakertown, Hunterdon County
- Rancocas Friends Meeting House, Rancocas, Burlington County
- Randolph Friends Meeting House, Randolph, Morris County
- Seaville Friends Meeting House, Seaville, Cape May County (This 1716–1727 meeting house is the smallest frame Quaker meeting house in the United States.)
- Stony Brook Meeting House and Cemetery, Princeton
- Trenton Friends Meeting House, Trenton
- Upper Greenwich Friends Meetinghouse, Mickleton, Gloucester County
- Woodbury Friends' Meetinghouse, Woodbury, Gloucester County
- Woodstown Monthly Meeting of Friends, Woodstown, New Jersey, Salem County

=== New York ===
- Amawalk Friends Meeting House, Yorktown Heights
- Beekman Meeting House and Friends' Cemetery, LaGrangeville
- Bethpage Friends Meeting House, Farmingdale
- Boerum Friends Meeting House and School, Boerum Hill, Brooklyn, New York City
- John Bowne House, Flushing, Queens, New York City (John Bowne was arrested in 1662 for hosting a meeting in his house.)
- Brooklyn Friends Meeting House and School, Brooklyn, New York City
- Chappaqua Friends Meeting House, Chappaqua, Westchester County, (built in 1754)
- Clinton Corners Friends Church, Clinton Corners, Dutchess County
- Clinton Hill Orthodox Friends Meeting House, Brooklyn, New York City (now Apostolic Faith Mission)
- Cornwall Friends Meeting House, New York
- Creek Meeting House and Friends' Cemetery, New York
- Crum Elbow Meeting House and Cemetery, East Park, Dutchess County
- Easton Friends North Meetinghouse, Middle Falls, Washington County
- Farmington Quaker Crossroads Historic District, Farmington, New York, NRHP-listed
- Greenfield Preparative Meeting House, Grahamsville, Sullivan County
- Jericho Friends Meeting House Complex, Jericho, Nassau County
- Matinecock Friends Meetinghouse, New York
- Nine Partners Meeting House and Cemetery, Millbrook, Dutchess County
- North Street Friends Meetinghouse, Ledyard, Cayuga County
- Oblong Friends Meeting House, Pawling, Dutchess County
- Old Quaker Meeting House (Queens), Flushing, Queens, New York City, NRHP-listed
- Orchard Park Friends Meeting House, Orchard Park, Erie County, FGC Affiliated
- Oswego Meeting House and Friends' Cemetery, Oswego, Oswego County
- Poughkeepsie Meeting House (Hooker Avenue), Poughkeepsie, Dutchess County
- Poughkeepsie Meeting House (Montgomery Street), Poughkeepsie, Dutchess County
- Quaker Street Historic District, Duanesburg, New York, NRHP-listed
- Rye Meeting House, Rye, Westchester County
- Smith Clove Meetinghouse, Highland Mills, Orange County
- Society of Friends Hall, Glen Falls, Warren County
- Upperville Meeting House, Upperville, Chenango County

=== North Carolina ===
- Cane Creek Friends Meeting, Snow Camp
- Deep River Friends Meeting House and Cemetery, High Point
- Friends Spring Meeting House, Snow Camp
- New Garden Meeting House, Guilford County
- Springfield Friends Meeting, Guilford County
- West Grove Friends Spring Meeting House, Alamance County

=== Ohio ===
- Concord Hicksite Friends Meeting House, east of Colerain, Belmont County
- Green Plain Monthly Meetinghouse, South Charleston, Clark County
- Mount Pleasant Friends Meeting House, Mount Pleasant, Jefferson County
- Wilmington Friends Meeting House, Wilmington, Clinton County

=== Pennsylvania ===
- Abington Friends Meeting House, Jenkintown, Montgomery County
- Arch Street Friends Meeting House, Philadelphia
- Birmingham Friends Meetinghouse, Birmingham Township, Chester County
- Buckingham Friends Meeting House, Buckingham Township, Bucks County, NRHP-listed
- Birmingham Orthodox Meeting House, Birmingham Township, Chester County
- Bradford Friends Meetinghouse, Marshallton, Chester County, (also called Marshallton Meeting House)
- Caln Meeting House, Caln Township, Chester County
- Catawissa Friends Meetinghouse, Catawissa, Columbia County
- Chester Friends Meetinghouse, Chester
- Chichester Friends Meetinghouse, Upper Chichester Township, Delaware County, (near Boothwyn)
- Concord Friends Meetinghouse, Concordville, Delaware County
- Darby Friends Meeting, Darby, Pennsylvania, Delaware County (founded 1682)
- Frankford Friends Meeting House, Frankford, Philadelphia
- Free Quaker Meetinghouse, Independence National Historical Park, Philadelphia, NRHP-listed
- Horsham Friends Meeting, Horsham Township, Bucks County
- Makefield Meeting, Upper Makefield Township, Bucks County
- Merion Friends Meeting House, Merion Station, Montgomery County
- Middletown Friends Meetinghouse, Lima, Delaware County
- Newtown Friends Meetinghouse, Newtown Township, Delaware County
- Old Haverford Friends Meetinghouse, Havertown, Delaware County, (founded 1683)
- Old Kennett Meetinghouse, Kennett Township near Chadds Ford, Chester County
- Parkersville Friends Meetinghouse, Pennsbury Township, Chester County
- Pittsburgh Friends Meeting, Pittsburgh, Pennsylvania
- Plymouth Friends Meetinghouse, Plymouth Township, Montgomery County
- Providence Quaker Cemetery and Chapel, Perryopolis, Fayette County, NRHP-listed
- Race Street Friends Meetinghouse, Philadelphia
- Radnor Friends Meetinghouse, Radnor Township, Delaware County
- Schuylkill Friends Meeting House, Phoenixville, Chester County
- Springfield Friends Meeting House, Springfield, Delaware County
- Upper Dublin Friends Meeting House, Upper Dublin Township, Montgomery County
- Uwchlan Meetinghouse, Uwchlan Township, Chester County
- Warrington Meetinghouse, Warrington, York County
- Wrightstown Friends Meeting Complex, Wrightstown, Bucks County
- York Meetinghouse, York, York County

=== Rhode Island ===
- Conanicut Friends Meetinghouse, Conanicut Island, Jamestown
- Friends Meeting House and Cemetery, Little Compton
- Great Friends Meeting House, Newport
- Portsmouth Friends Meetinghouse Parsonage and Cemetery, Portsmouth
- Saylesville Meetinghouse, Saylesville
- Smithfield Friends Meeting House, Parsonage and Cemetery, Smithfield

=== South Carolina ===
- Bush River Monthly Meeting, Bush River, Newberry County, South Carolina
- Camden, Camden, Kershaw County, South Carolina Old Quaker Cemetery

=== Tennessee ===
- Friends Church (Maryville, Tennessee), Maryville, Blount County, NRHP-listed. Now St. Andrew's Episcopal Church.

=== Texas ===
- Live Oak Friends Meeting House, Houston Heights, Houston. Located at 1318 West 26th Street, noted for its Skyspace by artist James Turrell
- Friends Meeting of San Antonio, Alamo Heights, San Antonio. Located at 7052 N Vandiver Rd.

=== Vermont ===
- South Starksboro Friends Meeting House and Cemetery, Starksboro, Addison County

=== Virginia ===
- Hopewell Meeting House, Clear Brook, Frederick County
- South River Friends Meetinghouse, Lynchburg
- Woodlawn Quaker Meetinghouse, Fort Belvoir, Fairfax County, NRHP-listed

=== Washington, D.C. ===
- Meeting House of the Friends Meeting of Washington, Washington, D.C.
