= Cropwell =

Cropwell may refer to:

- Cropwell, Alabama, an unincorporated community in Pell City, Alabama, United States
- Cropwell Bishop, a village in Nottinghamshire, England
- Cropwell Butler, a village in Nottinghamshire, England
- Cropwell, New Jersey, United States, an unincorporated community in Evesham Township, Burlington County
  - Cropwell Friends Meeting House, a historic Quaker meeting house in Cropwell
- Cropwell Township, a former name for Maple Shade Township, New Jersey, United States
