= Amawalk Friends Meeting House =

Historic church in New York, United States

- U.S. National Register of Historic Places
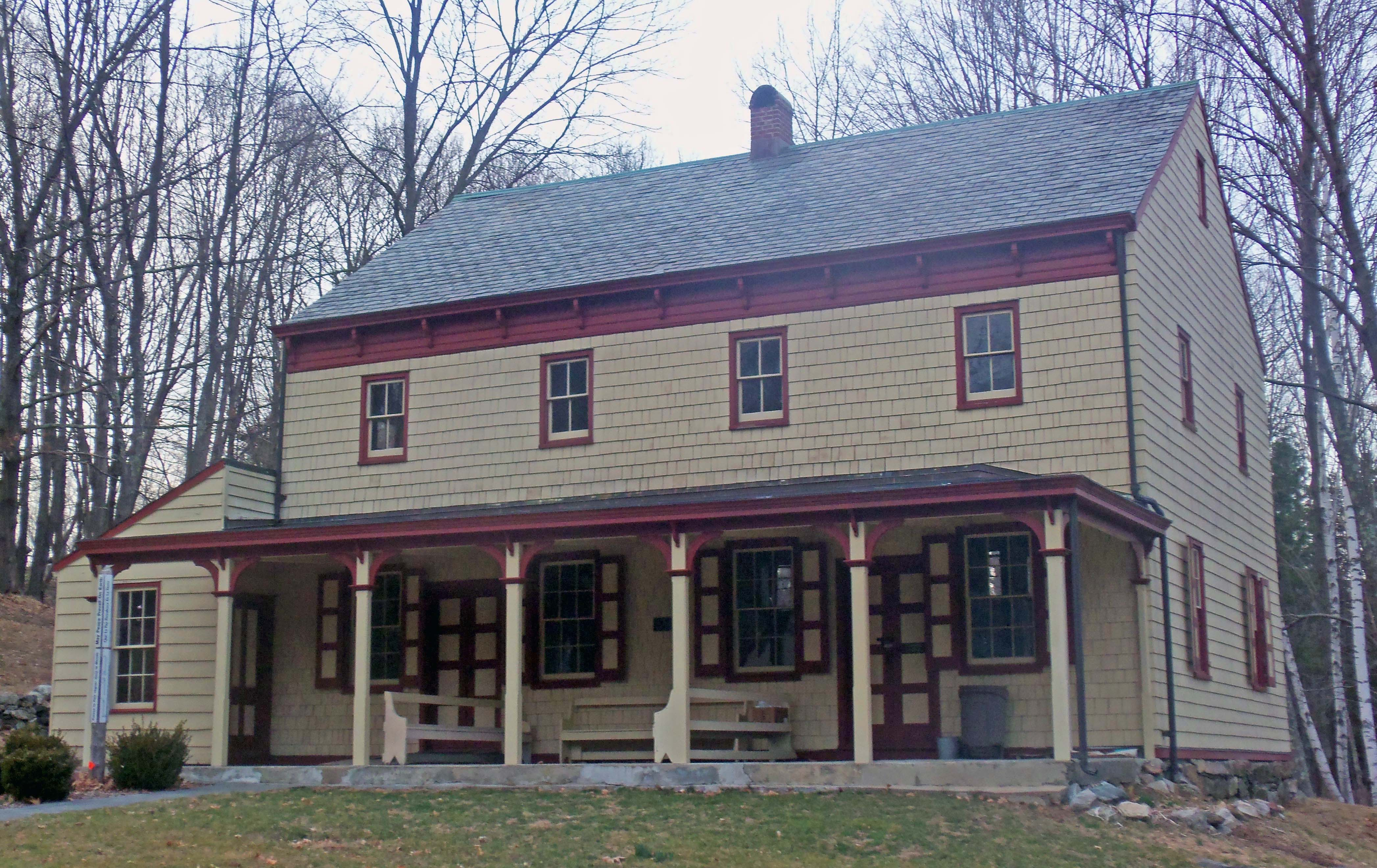
- South and east elevations, 2013

- Location within New York Location within the United States
- Location: Yorktown Heights, New York
- Nearest city: Peekskill
- Coordinates: 41°17′32″N 73°46′18″W
- Area: 2.9 acres (1.2 ha)
- Built: 1831
- NRHP reference No.: 89002004
- Added to NRHP: November 16, 1989

Amawalk Friends Meeting House is located on Quaker Church Road in Yorktown Heights, New York, United States. It is a timber frame structure built in the 1830s. In 1989 it and its adjoining cemetery were listed on the National Register of Historic Places.

Quakers had been active in north central Westchester County since the mid-18th century. The current meeting house was the third they built; fire destroyed both predecessors. Not only is it one of the most well-preserved and intact in the county, it is a rare surviving meeting house built by a Hicksite meeting during that schism in American Quakerism.

Architecturally the meeting house shows some signs of Greek Revival influence, also unusual for Quaker buildings. The addition of a porch later in the 19th century also brought in some Victorian touches, again unusual. Its interior was renovated and the building resided when meetings were revived after a brief period of dormancy. However, many of its original furnishings remain.

Taking up most of the property is the meeting's cemetery, which contains many graves of its members from the earlier years, along with that of Robert Capa, the accomplished mid-century war photographer, and his brother Cornell, although neither were members of the meeting, much less Quakers. The headstones of those graves strongly reflect Quaker burial practices, and thus the cemetery is included in the listing as a contributing resource. An architecturally sympathetic First Day School building added when meetings resumed in the 1970s is non-contributing due to its newness.

== Buildings and grounds ==
The 2.9-acre (1.2 ha) lot on which the meeting house, First Day school and cemetery are located is on the west side of Quaker Church Road, also at that point the boundary between the towns of Yorktown and Somers to its east. It is located 0.3 miles (500 m) north of Quaker Church's southern end at Saw Mill River Road (also U.S. Route 202, New York State Route 35 and New York State Route 118). This area was formerly the hamlet of Amawalk, which still lends its name not just to the meeting house but to the Amawalk Reservoir, part of the New York City water supply system, a half-mile (800 m) to the east.

Topographically the area consists of small low hills with occasional narrow depressions, often filled by creeks or wetlands, in between. The meeting house property slopes upward to the west, draining into the valley of an unnamed tributary of Hallocks Mill Brook, a tributary of the Muscoot River, which drains Amawalk Reservoir on its way to Muscoot Reservoir. Its neighborhood is residential, with most houses on large mostly wooded lots.

Across Quaker Church are two houses on such lots. Behind them is a cleared power line right-of-way closely paralleled by the North County Trailway rail trail. To the meeting house's west is Amawalk Hill Cemetery, with another cemetery, Carpenter Hill, to the north, buffered by a woodlot.

=== Meeting house ===
A short gravel driveway gives access to the property from the road, passing under the century-old oak and maple trees that shade and screen most of the lot. The meeting house is on the north of the parking area at its end. It is a two-and-a-half-story rectangular wood frame building measuring 30 by 40 feet (9.1 by 12.2 m), with one bay per 10 feet (3 m) of space on the facades. Wooden shingles make up most of the siding of the main block, with a small section of clapboard below the roofline. At its base is a fieldstone foundation; a single brick chimney pierces the center of the slate-shingled gable roof. A hip roofed porch runs the length of the first story's south (front) facade at ground level; on the west end is a small shed-roofed clapboard-sided one-story one-bay addition.

Two separate entrances with paneled wooden double doors are located just inside the outermost windows of the ground floor underneath the porch. The windows themselves are six-over-six double-hung sash windows in plain wooden surrounds with paneled wooden shutters echoing the doors. On the east facade's first story are similarly treated six-over-six double-hung windows. The western addition has a single similar window but without shutters, as does the northern facade.

The porch has a low concrete deck. In its middle are three plain wooden benches with curved backs arranged in a square pattern, facing outward. At its west end a single paneled wooden door leads into the shed-roofed addition. The roof is supported by seven square wooden pillars with curved brackets at the top. It has a molded cornice.

On the second story all windows are two-over-two double-hung sash, set in plain wooden surrounds without shutters. A smaller two-over-two is set in the apex of both gables at the attic level. On the south, scrolled brackets against the clapboard section support a molded cornice similar to that on the porch.

==== Interior ====
Both entrances open into the main meeting room, with cushioned wooden benches similar to those on the porch arranged facing the center. Some, meant for the meeting's, are fixed in place; The elders' benches, fixed in place, are arranged in three ascending steps; the other benches are not and can be reconfigured as necessary. Two small collapsible tables for the recording of minutes are located at either end of the first elders' bench. In the middle of the benches are two small wood-burning stoves, one of which dates to the late 19th century. The building otherwise has no heating, plumbing or electricity.

The room is floored in linoleum. On the plain plaster walls traces of the wall that partitioned the meeting room into separate sections for men and women are still visible. The frame of a door that once breached that wall is also present, on the south side. A door in the west wall leads to the addition, which serves as a cloakroom and privy. Inside, the meeting house's hand-hewn pegged structural beams are exposed.

Several wooden pillars, some with original kerosene lamps attached, hold up the wooden gallery, reached by stairs in the southern corners. It is 8 1/2 feet (2.6 m) above the ground floor, 9 feet (2.7 m) deep on the southern side and 7 feet (2.1 m) on the east and west sides. The former has loose benches while the latter sections have fixed ones. A ladder on the east side climbs to the full-length attic. There, as in the cloakroom, the building's structural beams are exposed.

=== First Day School and cemetery ===
On the south side of the parking lot is the First Day School building. It is a smaller timber frame gable-roofed structure with the same siding and color treatment as the meeting house. Since it was built on the site of the meeting's stable in the 1970s, it is considered a non-contributing resource to the property's historic character.

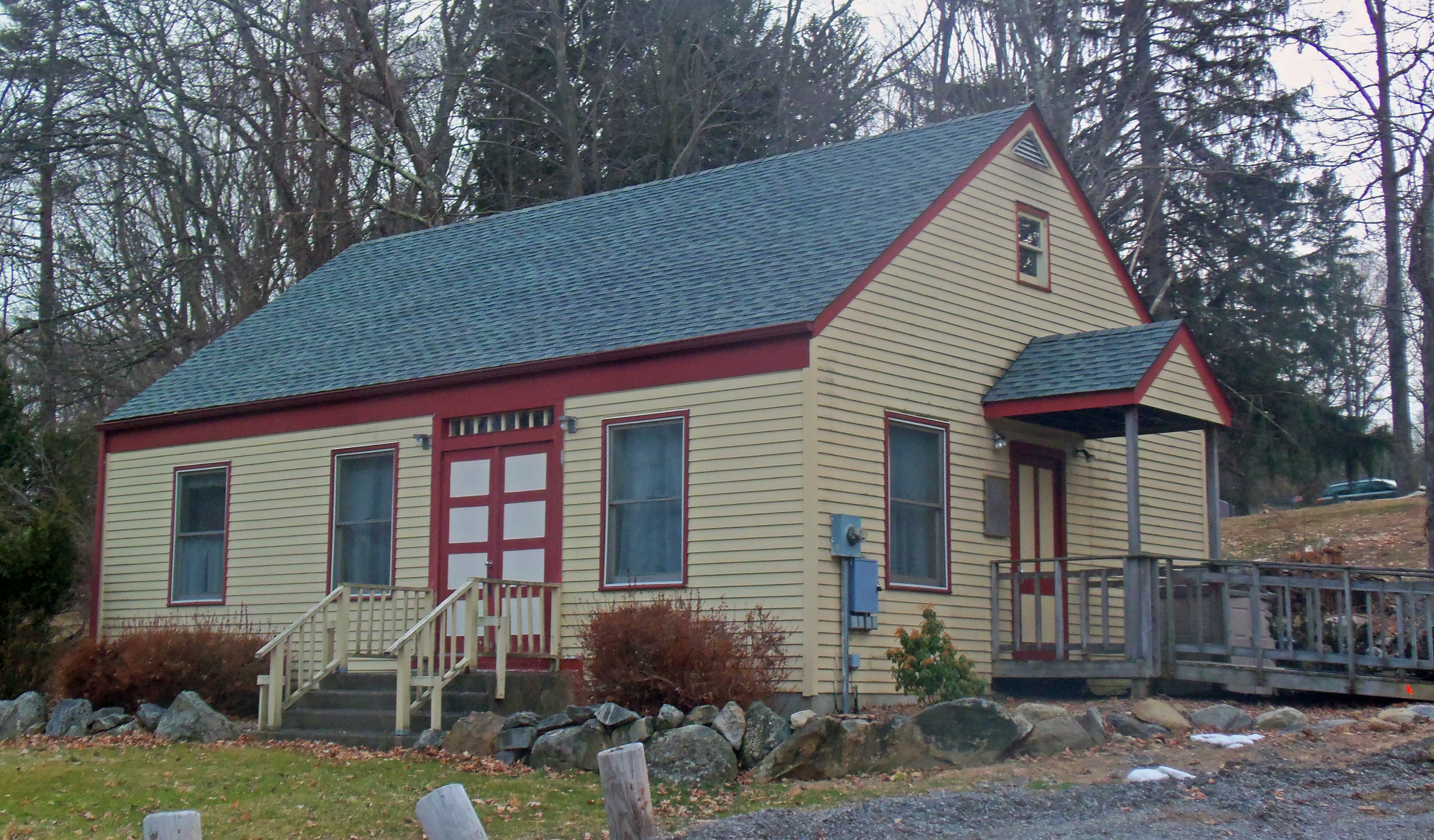
The First Day School building, west profile and north elevations

Conversely, the cemetery, rising up the hillside to the west, is considered a contributing site. Its graves, some of which are thickly overgrown, date from the late 18th century when the meeting was established to the present. The oldest with an identifiable name on its marker is that of Eugent Weeks, who died in 1805. Early markers are of sandstone, giving way to marble for later burials.

Many of the headstones reflect the Quaker virtue of simplicity and are devoid of funerary art, save for some on the southwest corner with a weeping willow design. They simply list the deceased's name, relationship to any others nearby, date of birth and date of death on the side facing away from the meeting house. Some graves have no markers at all.

== History ==
From its emergence in the mid-17th century, the Religious Society of Friends, later known as the Quakers, faced religious persecution in England. As Dissenters, their opposition to maintaining a leadership hierarchy or indeed any clergy at all was considered blasphemous and heretical, and members often met in secret. Many emigrated to the American colonies, where they could be a little more relaxed, but although their numbers grew they did not feel safe being open in their meetings until the mid-18th century.

=== 1760–1797: Establishment of Amawalk Meeting ===
With the new tolerance came a growth in Quaker meetings. Northern Westchester County was one of the hotbeds of that growth. Quakers established Chappaqua's original center around a 1754 meeting house that remains in use. The Amawalk meeting seems to have gotten its start around 1760. Six years later, the Purchase Monthly Meeting's minutes note that the "Cortlands Manor" meeting had sustained itself for at least a year, and the following year formally extended it for another year.

Growth continued, and the Amawalk meeting requested and received permission to build its first meeting house, on the current site, in 1772. It was completed the following year, and Amawalk was granted Preparative Meeting status in 1774. Five years later, the first meeting house was damaged by fire. Repairs were not done until 1783, and by that time the meeting had already decided to build a new house. The new meeting house was completed and paid for two years later. It was described as being of similar dimensions to the current building, with timber posts 17 feet (5.2 m) and cedar facing.

While the new house was being built, the Amawalk Quakers met in Chappaqua. In 1785 it was merged with that Monthly Meeting for administrative purposes. The meeting began establishing itself in the community—it started educating its children. In 1791 it started a school but had to close it down two years later when it could not find enough qualified teachers. In its stead, the meeting decided in 1796 to support a boarding school being planned by the Nine Partners Meeting outside the village of Millbrook in Dutchess County to the north.

The meeting engaged in social activism as well. In 1783 a member who had bought a slave in order to set him free asked the meeting to consider whether such an act was appropriate; the next month it was decided that it was not. The Amawalk meeting nevertheless followed the strong and growing abolitionist stance of American Quakers; by the next year it reported that none of its members owned slaves.

=== 1798–1839: Growth and schism ===
At the end of the century, in 1798, Amawalk finally received its own status as a Monthly Meeting. With the newer, bigger meeting house, members kept being added. By 1828, Amawalk had had under its care five Preparative Meetings: Peach Pond (discontinued 1811), Salem-Bedford, Peekskill and Croton.

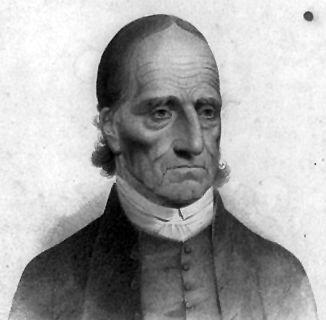
Elias Hicks

That same year, the meeting had to make a choice between two sides in a schism dividing American Quakers. In response to the growing fervor among evangelical Protestants in the country as a whole that has since come to be known as the Second Great Awakening, many orthodox Quaker meetings adopted practices similar to more mainstream Protestant denominations, adding rituals like hymns and prayers to their services. This was opposed by Elias Hicks, a Long Island Quaker influenced by the freethought movement, who not only reaffirmed the inner light as the traditional Quaker path to the divine but held it superior to the Bible. Many meetings chose one side or the other, and Amawalk's Quakers went with Hicks. The Orthodox members, who at one point had barred the Hicksites from the building, left to build their own meeting house closer to contemporary Yorktown Heights in 1832; it is no longer extant.

Near the end of 1830, the Amawalk meeting house burned. This time the damage was complete. The following year the current meeting house was built. Its construction costs came in slightly over the budgeted $1,250 ($38,000 in modern dollars).

It stands out from other Quaker meeting houses in two ways. Since the Orthodox meetings had, like the Amawalk splinter group, generally been the ones to leave and build their own meeting houses, while the Hicksites stayed in the existing buildings, the Amawalk meeting house is a rare meeting house built by a Hicksite meeting. Also, its design shows some of influence of the contemporary Greek Revival style, in the use of clapboard siding below the roof eave on the south (front) facade, creating a frieze. Quaker meeting houses built by the meetings, as opposed to structures adapted for their use, usually shun any architectural influences of their time in favor of a restrained plainness. Originally the meeting house's interior had a wall to allow for separate men's and women's business meetings, since women sometimes felt overwhelmed in the presence of men; this is the reason for the two entrances as well.

By the mid-1830s the minutes record that 74 families were members of the meeting. There was turnover among them—some members left the area or were disowned for alcohol use, marrying non-Quakers, or failure to attend meetings; but they were replaced by members who moved in from other areas and new converts. Activism continued; one member was imprisoned for 16 days in 1839 over his refusal to pay a "military demand" of $5.

=== 1840–1903: Decline ===
Membership began to decline in the 1840s, due in part to the effects of the schism on the meetings and the general fragmentation of society. In 1848 the Croton meeting was dissolved. At some point around this time, the shed addition was built on to the western side of the meeting house to serve as a cloakroom and privy. A belief that the building was a station on the Underground Railroad during this era has never been substantiated.

The Civil War, fought over slavery, tested the beliefs of all Quakers, including Amawalk. Near the war's end in 1865, the meeting's minutes record that "Friends have not been as careful to bear our testimony against war as the discipline requires". A footnote clarifies this, noting that five members had paid for substitutes to go into the Union Army in their stead, and at least one had enlisted himself.

In the years after the Civil War, the meeting's decline continued. Realizing that its insularity and withdrawal from society at large had been part of the reason for this, in 1869 the Society stopped discouraging its members from holding public office. The Amawalk meeting also improved its amenities, purchasing two wood-burning stoves, one of which remains, to heat the building during colder weather in 1883. Another 19th-century addition, the porch, reflects contemporary architectural trends in the curved brackets that connect its roof and the wooden support pillars, a Victorian touch that like the clapboard frieze reflects contemporary architectural trends, unusually for Quaker meeting houses.

While the members remained politically and socially active, writing the state legislature in 1882 in support of prohibition, these measures were not enough to stop the decline. Although Amawalk was able to sustain itself, its remaining preparative meetings, in Peekskill and Salem, could not. They were discontinued in 1883 and the remaining members merged into Amawalk. Even so, two years later the separate men's and women's meetings were merged. By the end of 1886 Amawalk's records indicate that it had just 96 members; no new members joined that year. Three years later, the land that had been purchased to build a meeting house in Peekskill was sold, followed by the Salem property in 1891.

The remaining members continued their activism, again writing the legislature in protest of its passage of legislation that lowered New York's age of consent to 13 later that year, and urging that it replace the death penalty with life imprisonment. Amawalk became an executive meeting in 1897, and it was incorporated in 1903.

=== 1904–1976: Capa burial and closure ===
Meetings continued despite the continuing decline in members, although they were not held regularly. In 1920 Hicksite and Orthodox Quakers reached out to each other and began the long process of reconciling; it would take almost a half-century.

Ten years later the carpet in the interior was taken up and replaced by linoleum. The Amawalk meeting remained active, becoming involved in activities that were more supportive than advocacy. They collected books for Faith Cabin Libraries serving African-American communities in Georgia and South Carolina. During World War II, they knitted patchwork quilts to be sent overseas and, afterwards, sponsored two of the Hiroshima Maidens who came to the United States for plastic surgery on their injuries.

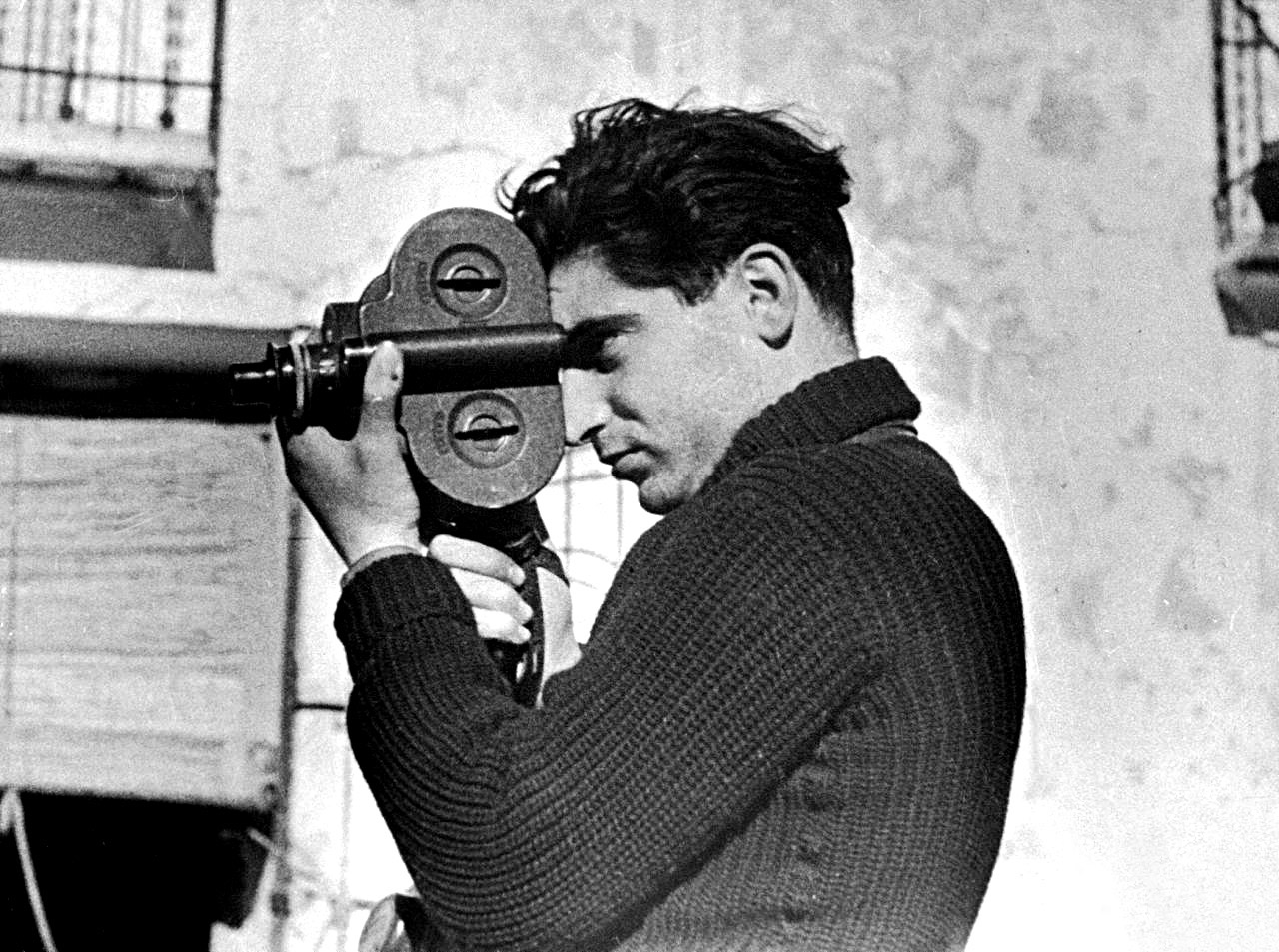
Robert Capa in 1937

In 1954 war photographer Robert Capa, whose gritty "Magnificent Eleven", taken under heavy German fire, are considered iconic images of the Normandy landings during World War II, died after he stepped on a land mine in Vietnam while covering the First Indochina War. John Morris, Capa's editor at Life magazine in London during the Normandy landings and at Magnum Photos at the time of his death, felt that a Quaker funeral would be a fitting tribute to Capa, a nonobservant Jew who had immigrated from Hungary. Morris' reasoning was that, even though Capa had not been a Quaker, he sought to promote peace through his depictions of the horrors of war. As a member of the Purchase Quarterly Meeting, which oversaw Amawalk, he arranged for a Quaker service there. At the service, Capa's brother Cornell said Kaddish. A young Dirck Halstead was among the attendees.

The few remaining members of the Amawalk meeting allowed Capa to be buried in their cemetery. Later his mother and sister-law were buried in the same plot, and Capa's biographer Richard Whelan joined them when he died. In 2008 Cornell, who had founded the International Center for Photography during the intervening years, was laid to rest alongside his brother. None of them were Quakers.

Ten years later, the meeting no longer had enough members to sustain itself. In 1964 it was officially closed. The house remained, suffering from neglect. What members there had been remained socially active, helping a Vietnamese family resettle in the area.

=== 1977–present: Revival and renovation ===
Four years after Amawalk closed, the Hicksites and Orthodox Quakers fully reconciled and ended the schism after a century and a half. Along with the spiritual quests by baby boomers that have been called the Fourth Great Awakening, that helped rekindle interest in the Society. Meetings began being held again in 1977, and shortly afterward the window was added to the south side of the cloakroom, the most recent change to the meeting house's exterior.

The new members made the property their priority. The First Day School building was completed in 1987, with full modern amenities, on the site of a former horse stall. During the week it was used by a local nursery school. That same year, Amawalk had enough members to become a monthly meeting again.

In 1993, four years after the property was listed on the National Register, the meeting secured a $50,000 matching grant from the state's Historic Preservation Office to renovate the interior of the building, which had suffered from insect infiltration and water seepage over the years. The meeting raised its half through an auction of historic photos organized by Cornell Capa.

== See also ==
- List of Quaker meeting houses
- National Register of Historic Places listings in northern Westchester County, New York
