= Chappaqua Friends Meeting House =

Quaker meeting house in New York, US

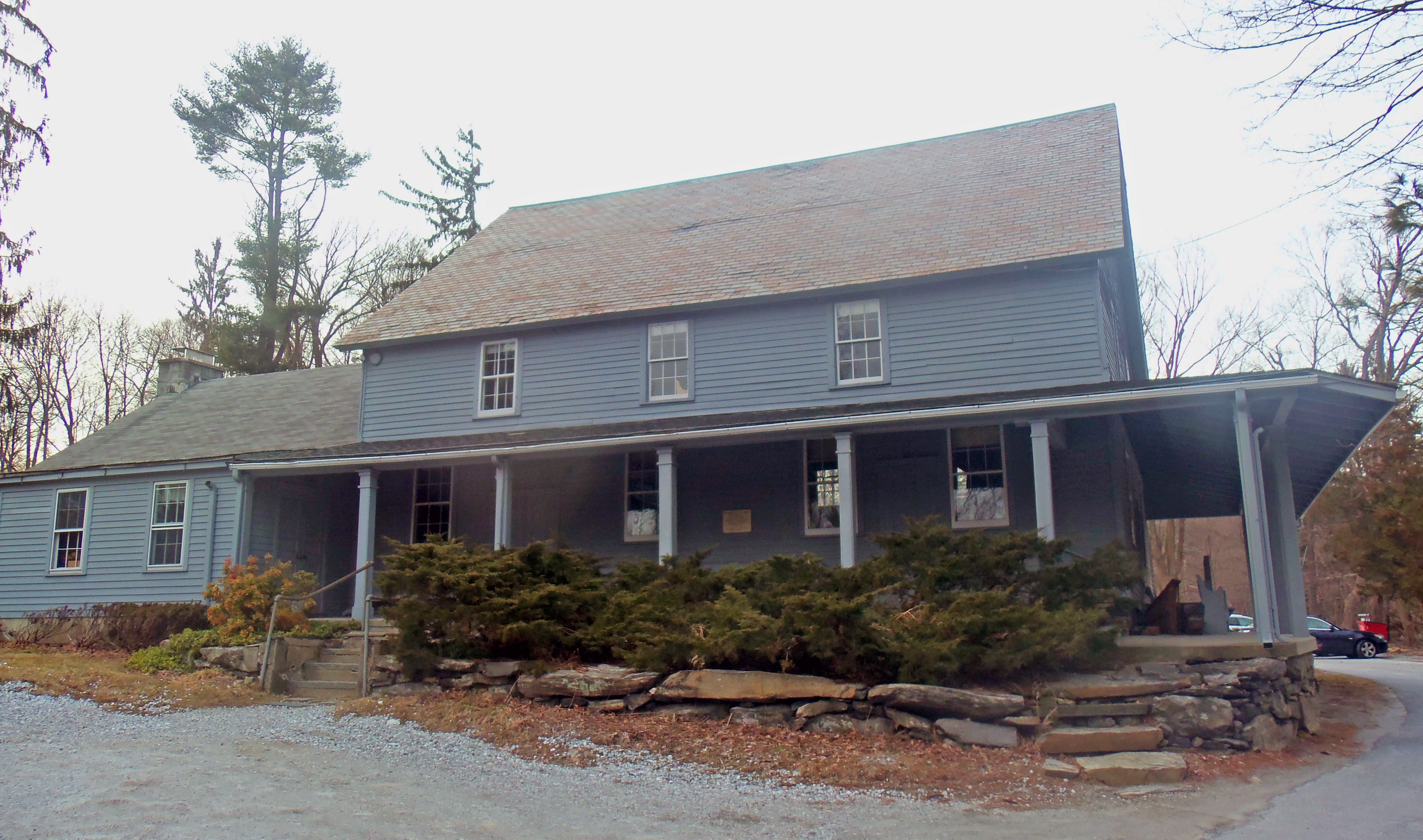
- Location: Chappaqua, New York
- Coordinates: 41°10′24″N 73°46′38″W
- Built: 1753

The Chappaqua Friends Meeting House, built 1753, is the oldest Quaker meeting house in Westchester County, New York, a stop on the Underground Railroad and a birthplace of the abolitionist movement in New York. In 1776 it served as a hospital for Continental Army soldiers injured at the nearby Battle of White Plains. According to tradition, blood stains from the injured and dying soldiers were visible for years after on the meeting house floorboards. George Washington visited the soldiers there, tying his horse to a large tree that stood between the meeting house and the road. The tree was blown down by the 1904 Chappaqua tornado. Some of Washington's troops, retreating from the Battle of White Plains in 1776, passed the meeting house on their march to the Pines Bridge across the Croton River and eventually across the Hudson and onward to Pennsylvania where they camped before crossing the Delaware River to attack Trenton. In 1781, Jean-Baptiste Donatien de Vimeur, comte de Rochambeau's troops marched along the same route on their way to the Pines Bridge and eventually to Virginia, where they joined Washington's forces to defeat Charles Cornwallis, 1st Marquess Cornwallis at the Siege of Yorktown, which led to the end of the war. Part of the Old Chappaqua Historic District, it is a stop on the African American Heritage Trail of Westchester County.

In 2020, a Black Lives Matter sign in front of the house was defaced, prompting the organization to release a statement in support of the movement and its ideals.
