= Hiram Braxton House =

Historic house in North Carolina, United States

- U.S. National Register of Historic Places
- Location within North Carolina Location within the United States
- Location: 3440 Newlin Road, near Snow Camp, North Carolina
- Coordinates: 35°52′6″N 79°19′6″W
- Area: 5.5 acres (2.2 ha)
- Built: c. 1865, 1884
- MPS: Log Buildings in Alamance County MPS
- NRHP reference No.: 93001193
- Added to NRHP: November 22, 1993

Hiram Braxton House is a historic house located near Snow Camp, Alamance County, North Carolina.

== Description and history ==
The original one-story V-notched log house was built about 1865. A side frame addition was built in 1884. The house has a standing seam metal roof and sits on a rock pier foundation.

It was added to the National Register of Historic Places on November 22, 1993.
