= Snow Camp Mutual Telephone Exchange Building =

- U.S. National Register of Historic Places
- Location within North Carolina Location within the United States
- Location: SR 1004, .2 mi. S of SR 1005, Snow Camp, North Carolina
- Coordinates: 35°53′20″N 79°25′50″W
- Area: 2.3 acres (0.93 ha)
- Built: 1915, 1927, 1986
- Architectural style: One-over-one house
- NRHP reference No.: 89000497
- Added to NRHP: June 9, 1989

Snow Camp Mutual Telephone Exchange Building is a historic telephone exchange building located at Snow Camp, Alamance County, North Carolina. It was built in 1915, and is a small, square, vernacular, two-story frame structure. It has a pyramidal roof and rests on a stone foundation. One-story gabled wings were added in 1927 when the building was converted into a dwelling. A one-story kitchen addition was built in 1986. The building housed the switchboard, operator, and company telephone equipment.

It was added to the National Register of Historic Places in 1989.
