= Camilus McBane House =

Historic house in North Carolina, United States

- U.S. National Register of Historic Places
- Location within North Carolina Location within the United States
- Nearest city: Off NC 2345 N side, 0.3 miles W of jct. with NC 2340, 0.2 miles down unnamed rd., near Snow Camp, North Carolina
- Coordinates: 35°52′43″N 79°18′49″W
- Area: 8.8 acres (3.6 ha)
- Built: c. 1850, 1891
- Built by: Sherman McBane (1892 addition)
- Architectural style: Log
- MPS: Log Buildings in Alamance County MPS
- NRHP reference No.: 93001196
- Added to NRHP: November 22, 1993

Camilus McBane House is a historic home located near Snow Camp, Alamance County, North Carolina. The house consists of two log buildings: a one-story, single-room log kitchen and a one-story with loft hall-and-parlor plan log house built about 1850. It was expanded in 1892 by a one-room frame side addition.

It was added to the National Register of Historic Places in 1993.
