= Brooklyn Frontiers High School =

Public school in New York City

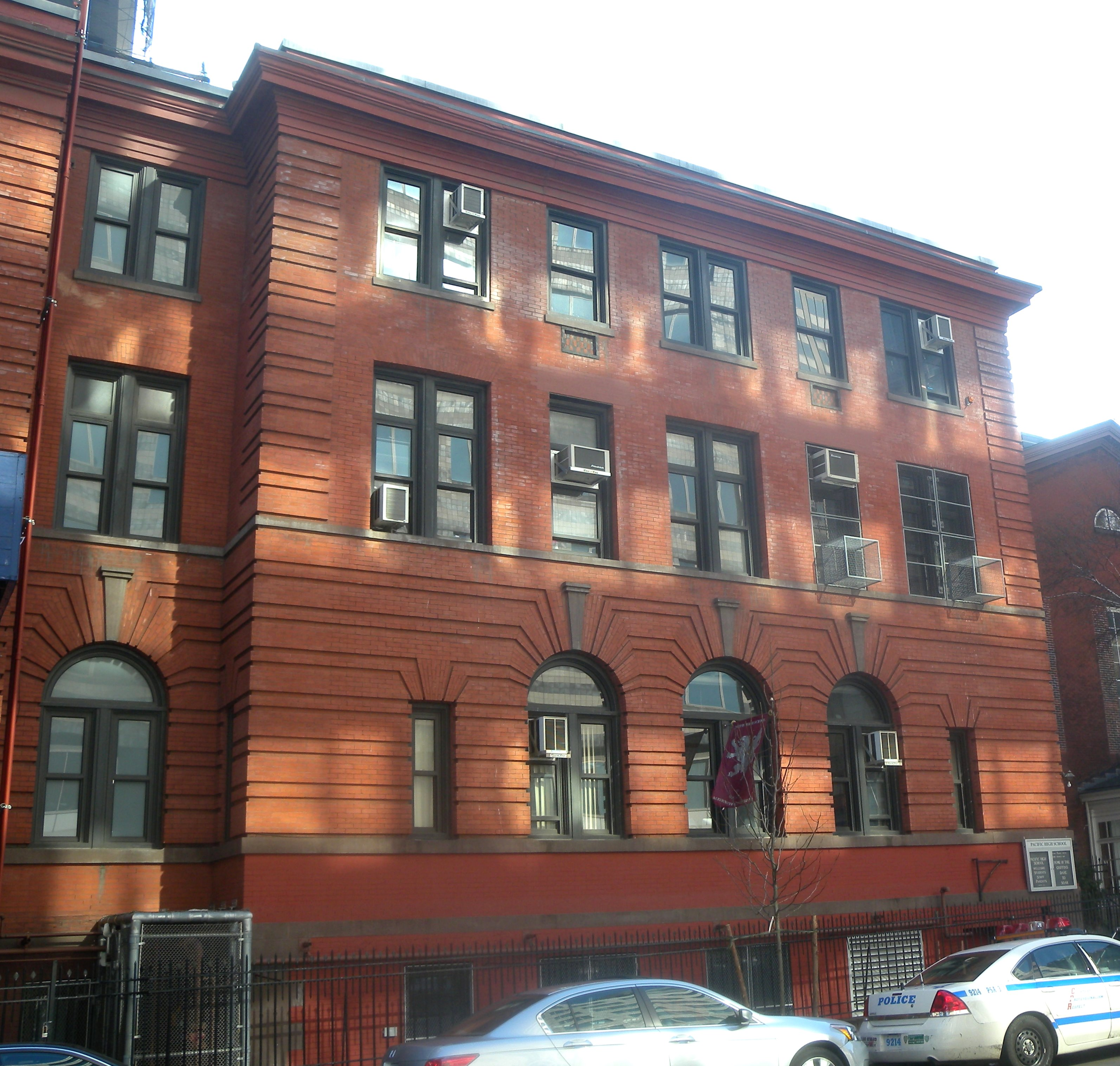
- 1902 building, originally Brooklyn Friends School

Location
- 112 Schermerhorn Street; Brooklyn, New York 11201; United States
- Coordinates: 40°41′24″N 73°59′21″W

Information
- School type: Public, secondary, alternative
- Opened: 2011
- Status: open
- Principal: Alona Cohen
- Grades: 9-12
- Gender: Coed
- Enrollment: 169 (2012-08)
- Student to teacher ratio: 12
- Campus type: Urban
- Athletics conference: PSAL
- Website: Brooklyn Frontiers HS official website

Brooklyn Frontiers High School is an alternative high school operated by the New York City Board of Education which opened in 2011. It is located in Brooklyn, New York at 112 Schermerhorn Street, a 1902 building that was designed by William Tubby to house the Brooklyn Friends School and that is listed on the National Register of Historic Places. Pacific High School was housed in the same building from sometime prior to 1992 until its closing in 2012.

Brooklyn Frontiers High school is an NYC DOE transfer school that serves both students entering high school from middle school two years overage as well as students who have already attended high school at another location and want a new start. The school is run in partnership with Good Shepherd Services.
