= Long Plain Friends Meetinghouse =

Historic church in Massachusetts, United States

- U.S. National Register of Historic Places
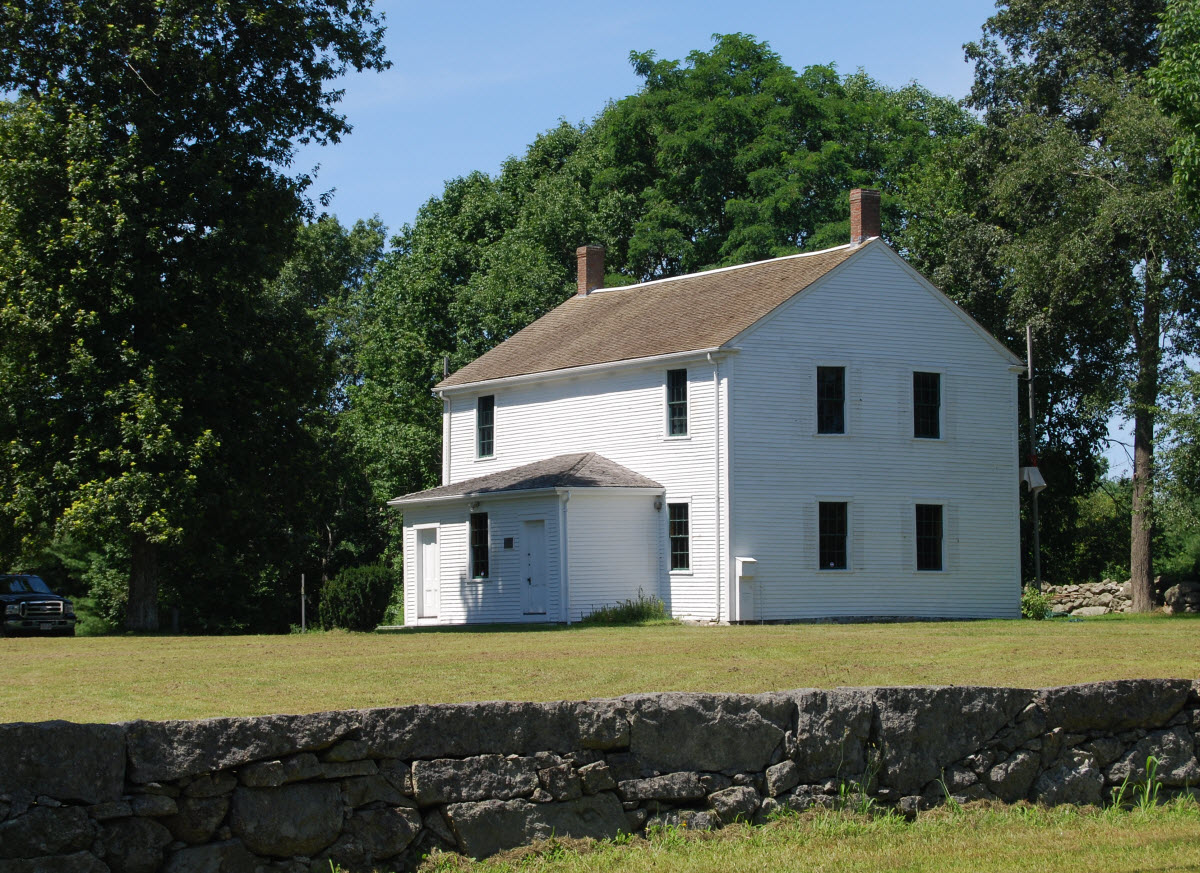

- Location within Massachusetts Location within the United States
- Location: Acushnet, Massachusetts
- Coordinates: 41°44′50″N 70°54′7″W
- Built: 1759
- NRHP reference No.: 86001374
- Added to NRHP: June 26, 1986

The Long Plain Friends Meetinghouse is a historic Quaker meeting house at 1341 N. Main Street in Acushnet, Massachusetts. It is a two-story wood-frame structure, with a gable roof and two chimneys. A single-story hip-roof vestibule projects from the front, with a pair of entrances flanking a window. Built in 1759, it is the oldest ecclesiastical building to survive in southeastern Massachusetts. It was listed on the National Register of Historic Places in 1986.

The building served as Quaker meeting house until 1985, when it was taken over by the Long Plain Museum. It is open for tours on weekends, and features original artifacts, pews from three centuries, and a small museum with exhibits about Quakers.

== See also ==
- National Register of Historic Places listings in Bristol County, Massachusetts
