= East Blackstone Friends Meetinghouse =

Historic church in Massachusetts, United States

- U.S. National Register of Historic Places
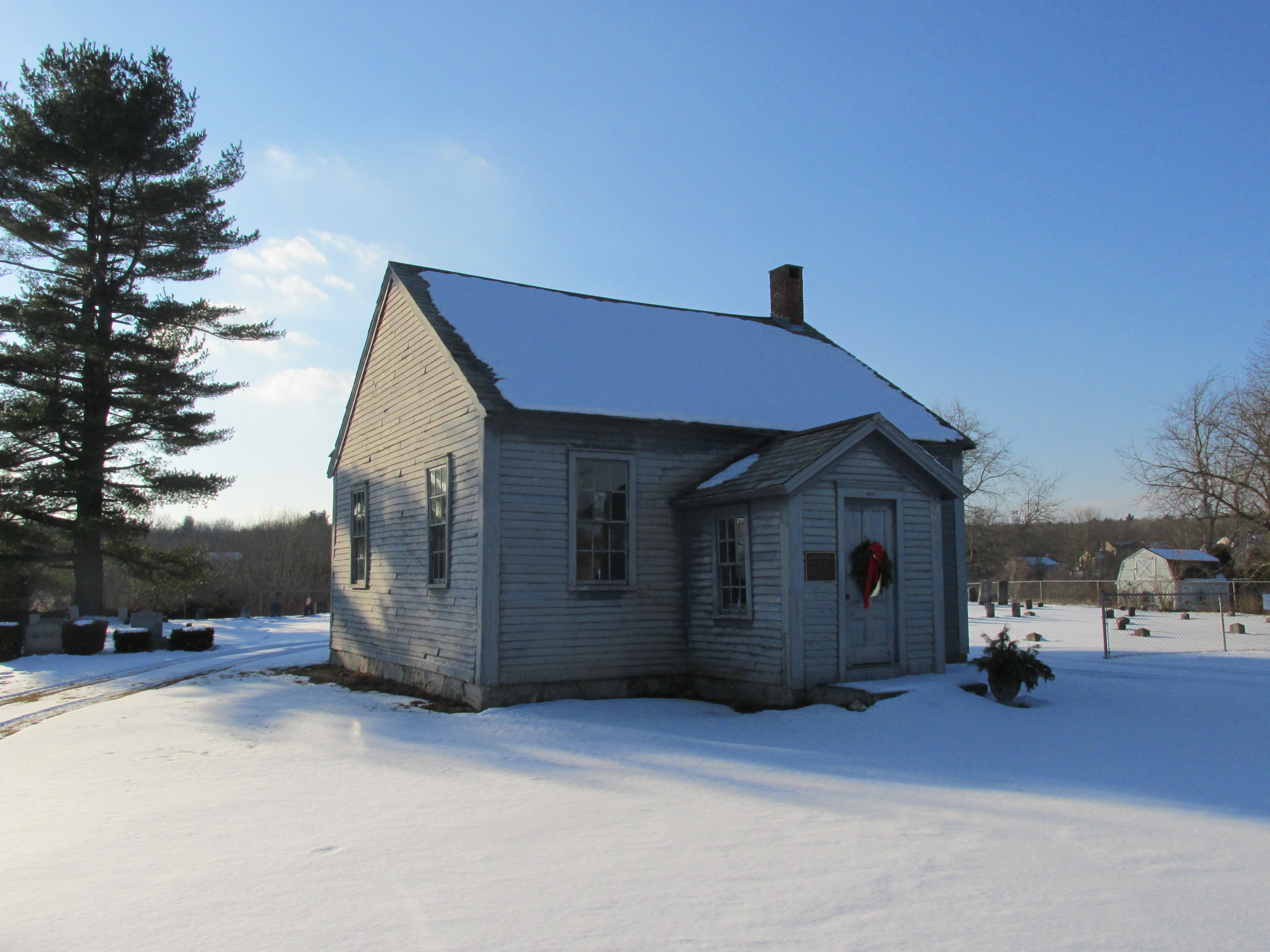
- East Blackstone Friends Meetinghouse

- Location within Massachusetts Location within the United States
- Location: 197 Elm Street, Blackstone, Massachusetts
- Coordinates: 42°3′9″N 71°31′23″W
- Built: 1812
- Architectural style: Georgian
- NRHP reference No.: 95001035
- Added to NRHP: August 22, 1995

The East Blackstone Friends Meetinghouse (also known as "Mendon Lower Meeting" or "Smithfield Monthly Meeting") is a historic Quaker meetinghouse in Blackstone, Massachusetts. The small single-story wood-frame structure was built in 1812 on land donated to the Quakers by Samuel Smith, a local landowner. The building was used regularly throughout the 19th century for meetings, and sporadically since then.

The meeting house was listed on the National Register of Historic Places in 1995.

== See also ==
- National Register of Historic Places listings in Worcester County, Massachusetts

== See also ==
- Meetinghouse web site
