= Raisin Valley Friends Meetinghouse =

Historic church in Michigan, United States

- U.S. National Register of Historic Places
- Michigan State Historic Site
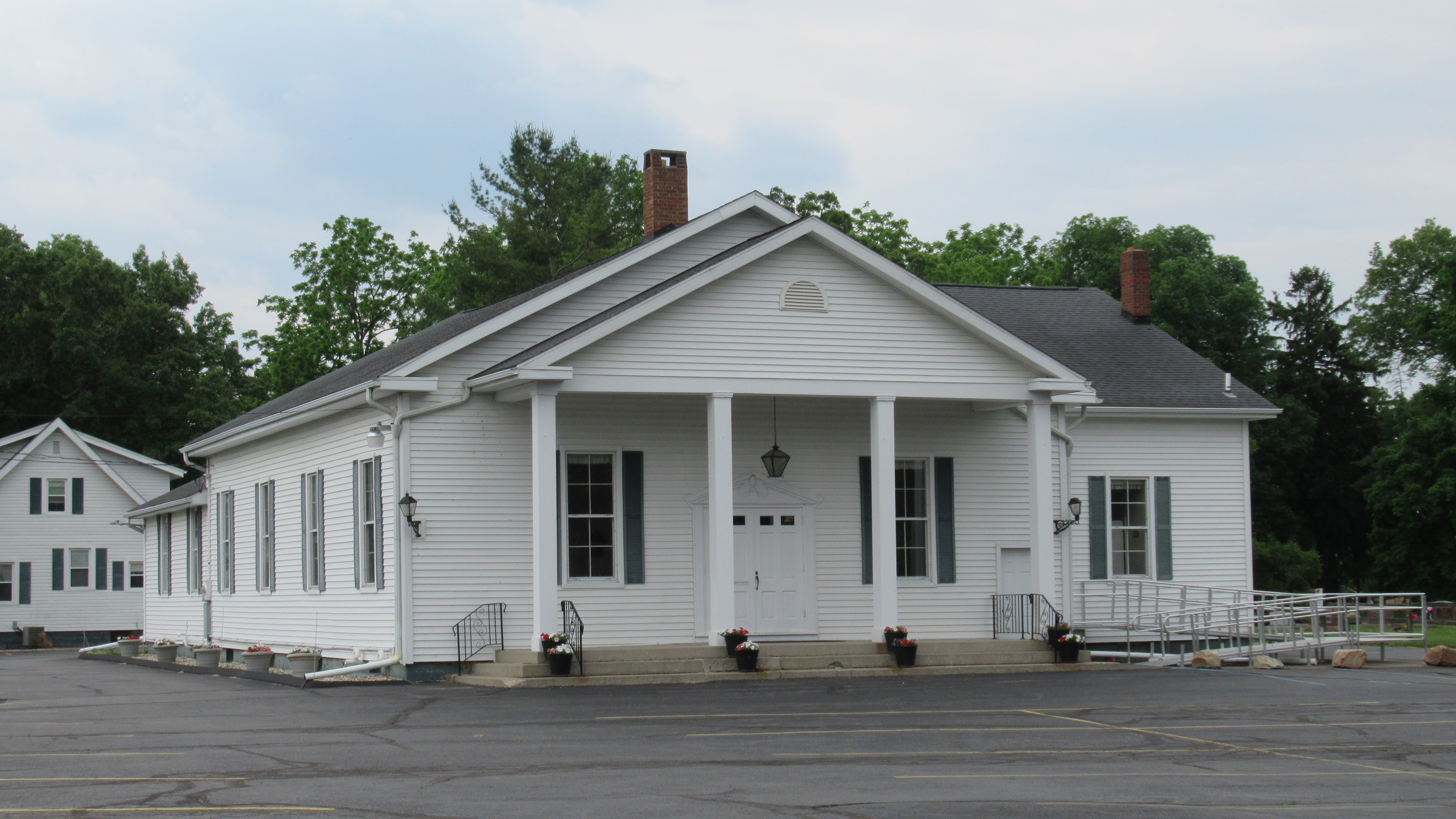

- Location within Michigan Location within the United States
- Interactive map
- Location: 3552 N. Adrian Highway; Adrian Charter Township, Michigan
- Coordinates: 41°56′17″N 84°00′21″W
- Built: 1835
- NRHP reference No.: 82002847

Significant dates
- Added to NRHP: April 28, 1982
- Designated MSHS: January 23, 1992

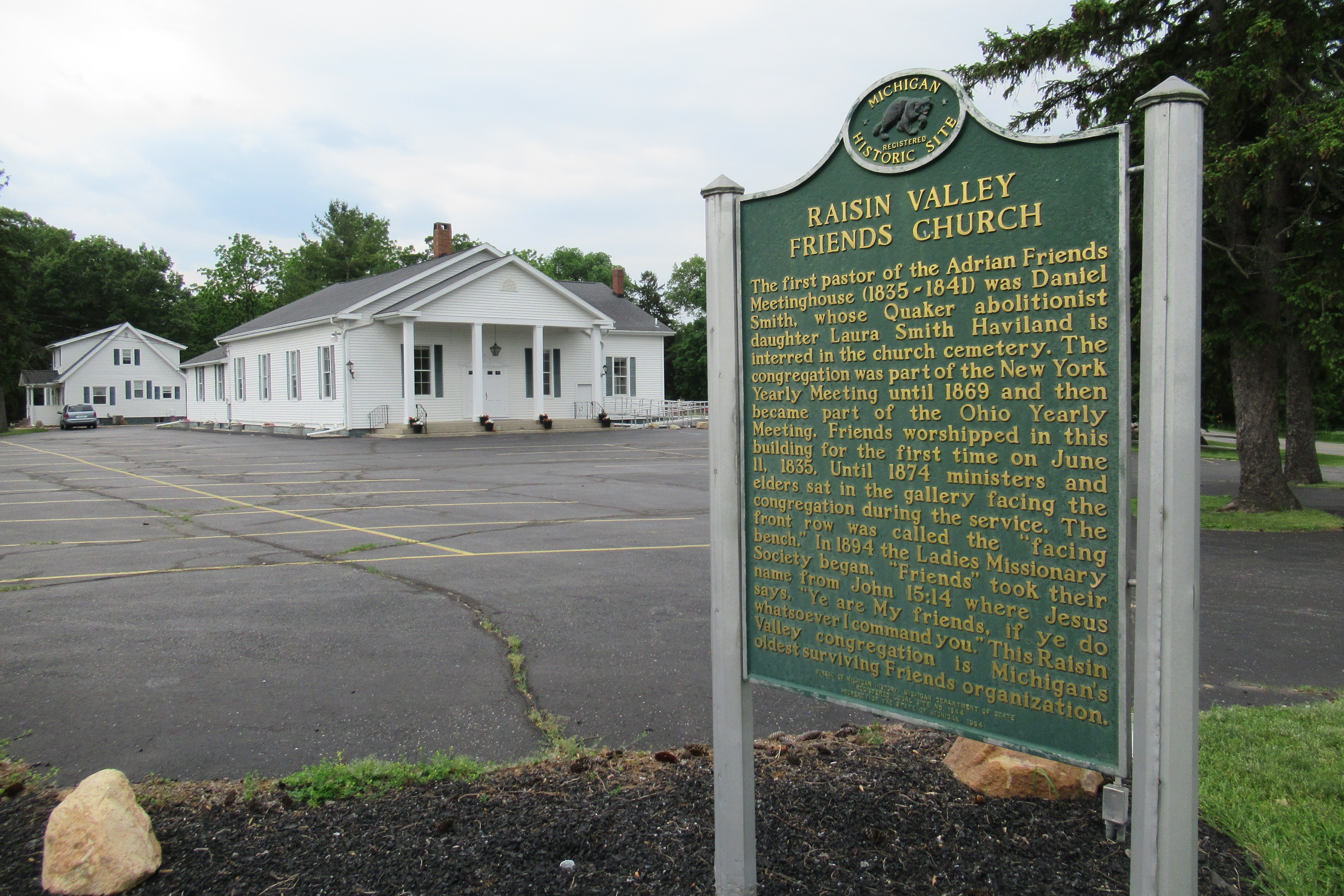
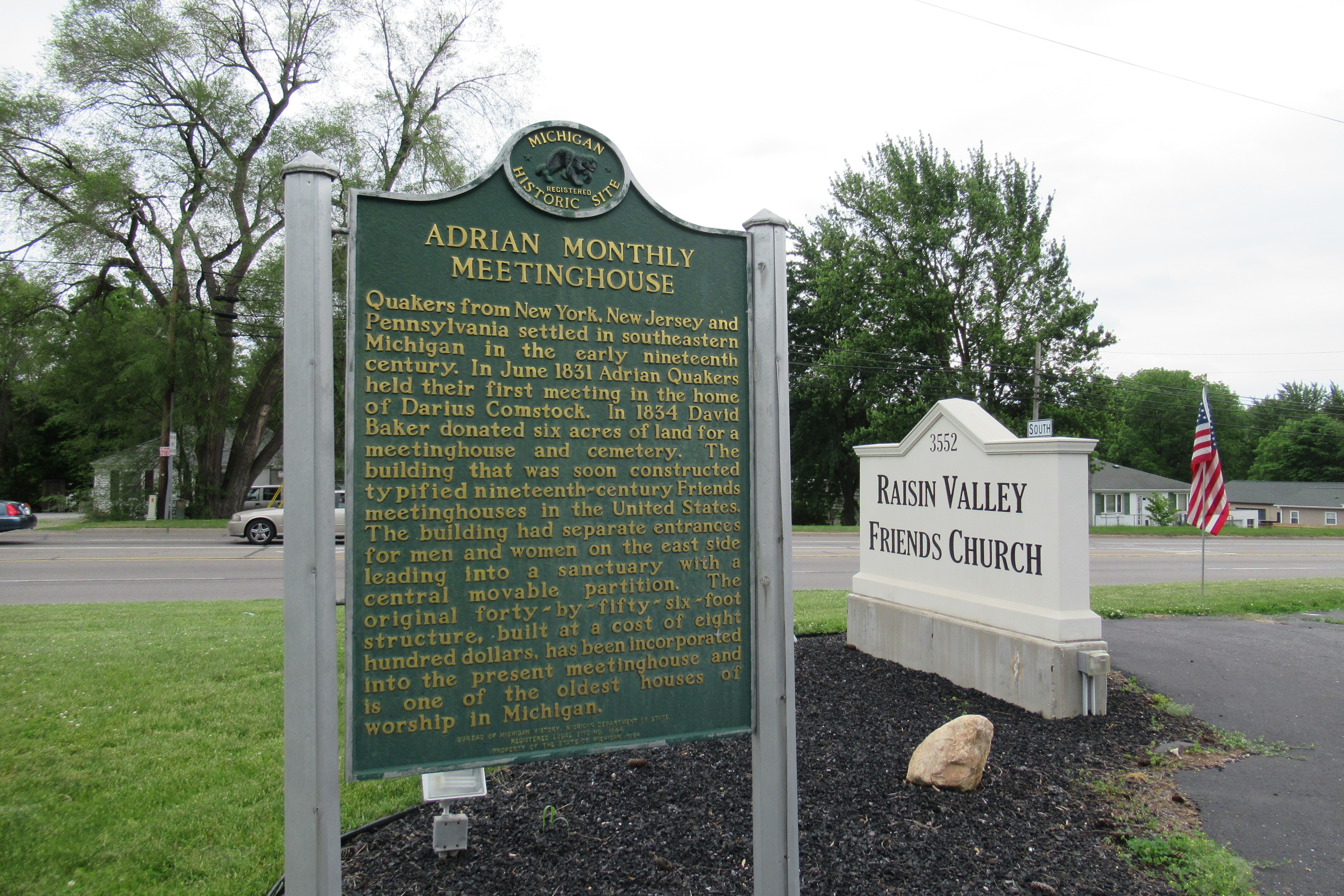
Both sides of the joint Raisin Valley Friends Church / Adrian Monthly Meetinghouse state historic marker

The Raisin Valley Friends Meetinghouse is a historic church located at 3552 North Adrian Highway (M-52) in Adrian Charter Township about two miles (3.2 km) north of the city of Adrian in central Lenawee County, Michigan. It was added to the National Register of Historic Places on April 28, 1982, and later designated as a Michigan Historic Site on January 23, 1992. It houses the oldest Quaker congregation in Michigan, which was established in 1831. It is also recognized as the second oldest continuously operating church building in the state of Michigan after the Mission Church in Mackinac Island, which was built in 1829.

== History ==
In 1831, Quaker missionaries travelling to Michigan established two congregations. One of these, initially known as Adrian meeting, evolved into the Raisin Valley Friends. Raisin Valley Friends initially worshipped in a log cabin located near the present church property, but by 1834 the congregation had grown large enough that a permanent meeting place was called for. Local settler David Baker made a six-acre parcel available, and the congregation raised $800 (~$24,968 in 2025) to build this church, which opened in 1835.

The church, which had an abolitionism stance, is recognized as having served as a major stop in Michigan's Underground Railroad network. Abolitionists Charles and Laura Smith Haviland founded the Raisin Institute at the church, and poet and abolitionist Elizabeth Margaret Chandler was also a member of the congregation.

In 1947, a basement was added to the building. In 1953 an addition was constructed, and in 1961 a Sunday School unit was added to one end, In the later 1960s, a front porch was added. The building continues to house the Raisin Valley Friends Church.

== Description ==
The simple, wooden church is typical of those built in the early nineteenth-century. The structure maintains its original appearance, with only modest changes in appearance due to the additions. The Raisin Valley Friends Meetinghouse is a single story clapboarded structure with simple corner boards, a thin classical cornice with returns, and a gable roof. An entrance is located at one end of the church, protected by a porch. The windows were originally sixteen pane double hung units; the current windows are substantially similar, and have the same size and placement.
