= Society of Friends Hall =

Historic church in New York, United States

- U.S. National Register of Historic Places
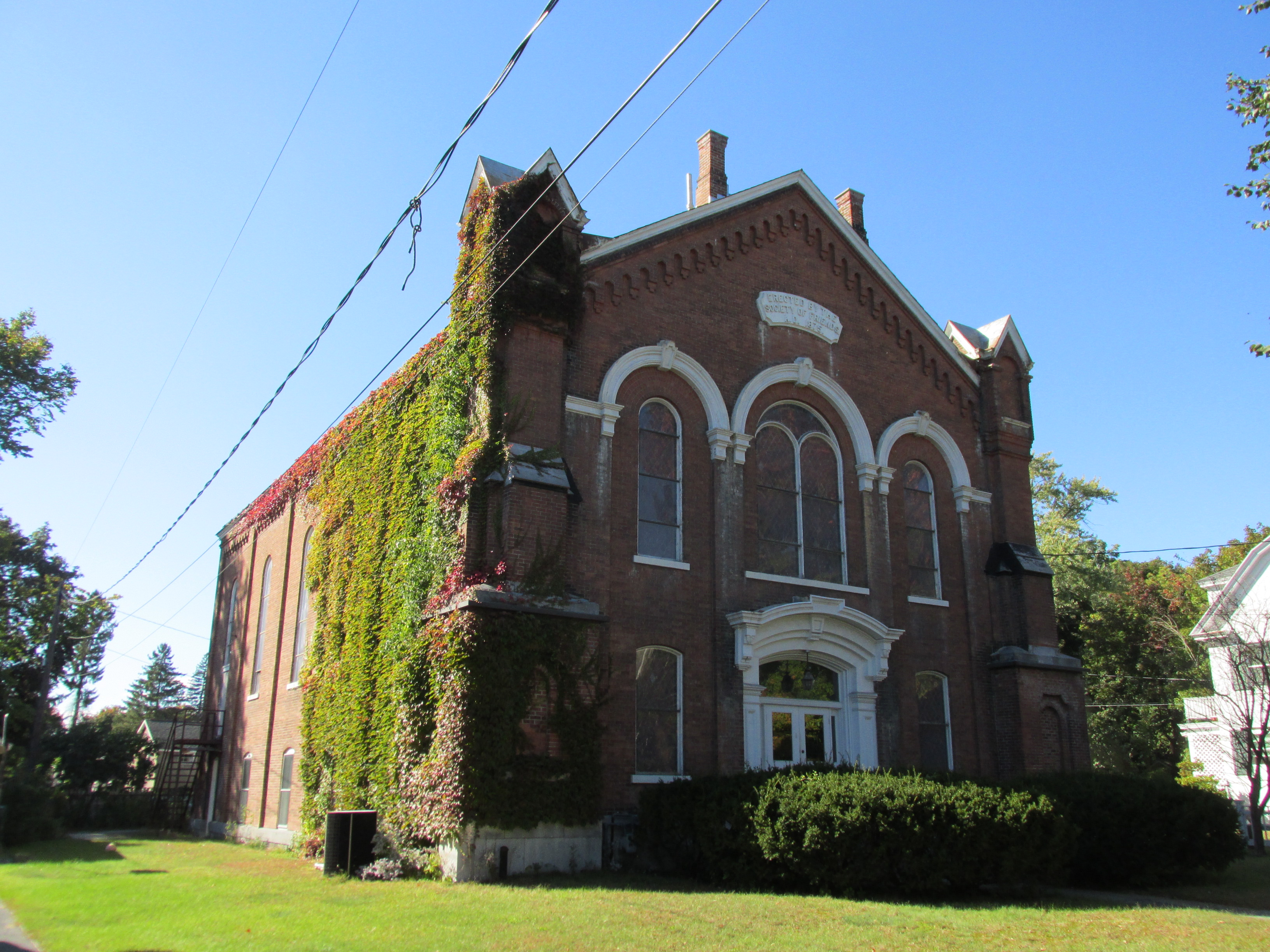
- Society of Friends Hall

- Location within New York Location within the United States
- Location: 172-174 Ridge St., Glens Falls, New York
- Coordinates: 43°18′58″N 73°37′55″W
- Area: less than one acre
- Built: 1875
- Architect: Cummings, Marcus F.; Pike, Lindsey & George
- Architectural style: Italianate
- MPS: Glens Falls MRA
- NRHP reference No.: 84003407
- Added to NRHP: September 29, 1984

The Society of Friends Hall is a historic Society of Friends meeting house located at 172-174 Ridge Street in Glens Falls, Warren County, New York. It is attributed to architect Marcus F. Cummings and built in 1875. It is a two-story, rectangular, Italianate style brick religious building. It features tall rounded arched windows and small corner towers with buttresses.

It was added to the National Register of Historic Places in 1984.
