= Finchley Meeting House =

Coordinates: 51°36′48.35″N 0°11′4.18″W

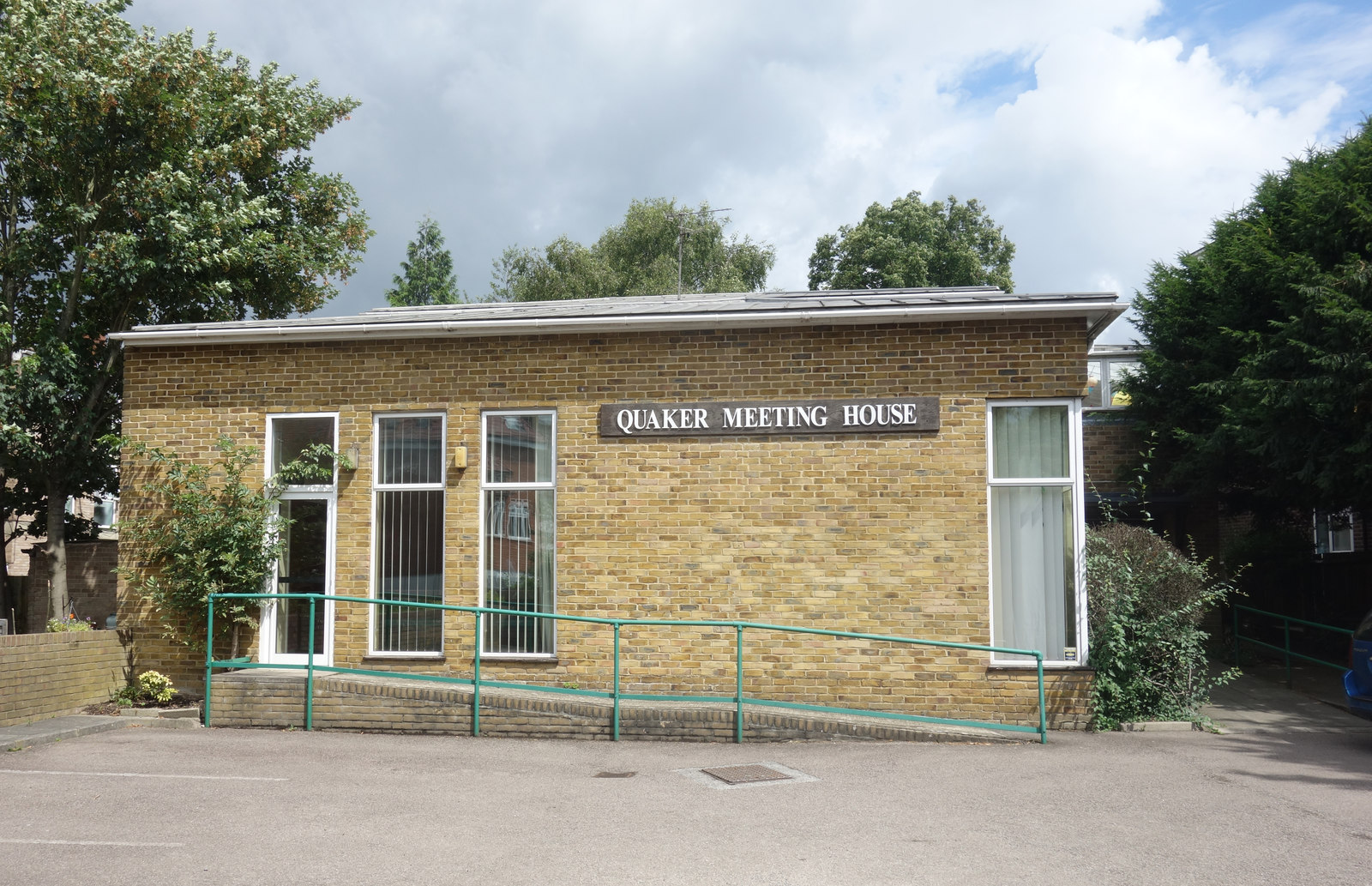
Quaker Meeting House, Alexandra Grove

The Finchley Meeting House is a Friends meeting house (a Quaker place of worship) at 58 Alexandra Grove in Finchley, London N12.

Quakers had first met in the area in a house in Ballards Lane from around 1882 to 1909, and a subset of the Hampstead meeting met monthly in Finchley from 1945 to 1950. A specific Finchley meeting began in 1952, it was based at 131 Nether Street in 1955; the Nether Street house having been let to the meeting by a member who had bought the house for them. Due to the ageing of the Nether Street house, new premises were sought, and a new Meeting House was built nearby on Alexandra Grove, opening in October 1967. It was designed by H. V. Sprince. The London: North edition of the Pevsner Architectural Guides describes the building as "Stock brick, with corner windows, and flat roofs stepping up from the hall to the wardens flat at the back".

The Meeting House was the base of the Finchley and District Peace Campaign until their closure in 2006.

The meeting for worship is held on Sundays at 10:30 am.
