= Cane Creek Friends Meeting =

- Location of Cane Creek Meeting Cane Creek Friends Meeting (the United States)
- 35°53′22″N 79°26′44″W
- Location: Snow Camp, Alamance County, North Carolina
- Country: United States
- Denomination: Quaker
- Website: canecreekfriends.com

History
- Status: Meeting for worship; Monthly meeting
- Founded: 1751
- Dedicated: October 6, 1942
- Events: 1764, Land donated for second meeting house; 1781, Occupation by British troops; 1786, Repairs to second meeting house; 1879, Fire destroyed third meeting house; 1880, Fourth meeting house completed; 1942, Fire destroyed fourth meeting house; 1984, Fire damaged fifth meeting house

Architecture
- Functional status: Active
- Years built: 1942
- Construction cost: $30,000–35,000

Specifications
- Materials: Brick

The Cane Creek Friends Meeting, founded in 1751, is considered the first established Quaker community in the Piedmont region of North Carolina. The site was occupied by British troops during the American Revolutionary War.

== History ==
Simon Dixon, a Quaker who migrated from Lancaster County, Pennsylvania, came to the Cane Creek area and what is now known as Snow Camp, North Carolina during the late 1740s. By 1751, as many as thirty other Quaker families had migrated to Snow Camp. During 1751, Quaker Minister Abigail Pike and Rachel Wright traveled to Perquimans County, North Carolina to attend the Quarterly Meeting at Little River, in hopes of gaining permission to establish a new monthly meeting in Cane Creek. Permission was granted and the first Monthly Meeting was held on October 7, 1751.

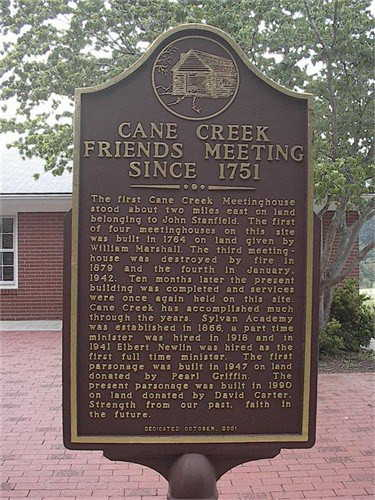
Quaker Minister Abigail Pike at the Cane Creek Meeting Place, NC in 1751

Certificates were issued to fifteen founding members on that date. By the following year, the Meeting had issued sixty-eight certificates. There have been five physical structures which have housed the Monthly Meeting; four of those, including the present day Cane Creek Meeting House, have stood on land donated by William Marshall and his wife Rebecca Dixon in 1764. The Cane Creek Monthly Meeting is often referred to as the "Mother of Meetings" because it gave rise to a number of other Monthly Meetings in the region.

The Meeting House operated a school named the Sylvan Grove Academy between 1866 and 1903. The current Sylvan Elementary school in Snow Camp reflects its heritage.

=== Revolutionary War ===
During the Revolutionary War the community of Snow Camp, North Carolina was briefly occupied following the Battle of Guilford Courthouse by General Charles Cornwallis and his troops, among others. During that time, the home and mill of Simon Dixon were seized for use as Cornwallis' headquarters. They slaughtered the livestock of the local farmers and used the Meeting House benches as their butcher blocks. A historical drama of these events is portrayed in a theater performance called, Sword of Peace by the Snow Camp Outdoor Theater.

== Notable members ==
Herman Husband, a leader during the War of the Regulation, was a member of the Cane Creek Meeting from 1762 to 1764. He was disowned from the community following his expression of dissatisfaction over the dismissal of another member.

Thomas Jefferson Hadley, a captain during the Revolutionary War, his father Joshua Hadley, and his grandfather Simon Hadley were Quakers from Ireland, and had joined the Cane Creek group upon arriving. Thomas was disowned due to participation in the war.
