= Springfield Friends Meeting =

Coordinates: 35.9320°N 79.9814°W

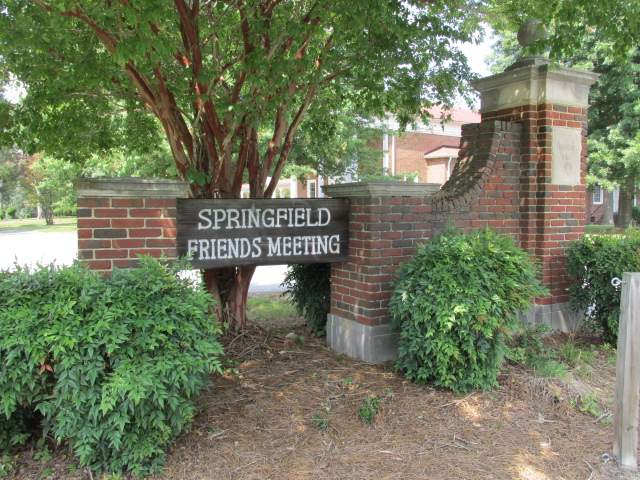
Springfield Friends Meeting, High Point, North Carolina

Springfield Friends Meeting is an historic Quaker meeting located in High Point, North Carolina.

== History ==
The first meeting for worship was held in 1773, when a group of families purchased 12 acres of land for the price of 5 shillings and built a log structure (no longer standing) which was the original meetinghouse. In 1780, at the request of Deep River Meeting, Springfield was set up as a preparative meeting. It was established as a monthly meeting in New Garden Quarter in 1790.

A second building (no longer standing) was built in 1805, and in 1858 a more substantial meetinghouse was built of bricks made on the site. It has separate entrances for men and women, which were the tradition at the time, and the old stone “uppenblocks” for mounting horses are still in front of the building. The 1858 meetinghouse is now the home for the Museum of Old Domestic Life, a hands-on museum of common household and farm implements from the 1800s.

The “new” meetinghouse was built in 1926 with guidance from member and architect John Jay Blair (1860-1937). This fourth building is the one used by Springfield Friends today. A large brick entry to the meeting grounds was added in 1931. A chapel was added in the early 1950s and a large new wing at the back with a fellowship hall and Sunday School rooms was built in 1964.

After the Civil War, Springfield Friends Meeting was the headquarters for eight years for the Baltimore Association of Friends to Advise and Assist Friends in the Southern States (usually known simply as the Baltimore Association), a group of Quaker business people and interested Friends from around the country. This group rebuilt schools, trained teachers and religious leaders, and established a Model Farm to demonstrate modern agricultural techniques and distribute seed and tools to farmers in war-ravaged North Carolina. The director chosen to lead this work was Allen Jay (1831-1910), a Quaker from Indiana, who together with his wife Martha had a great influence on Quakers throughout the South.

The house where the Jays lived is still standing and was used for many years as a regional office of the American Friends Service Committee. It is currently used by the Friends Emergency Material Assistance Program (FEMAP), which distributes health and personal care kits to infants, prisoners and migrant workers. Two local schools, a gymnasium built by the Works Progress Administration, and a subdivision are also named after Allen Jay.

Springfield Friends was a traditional “unprogrammed” congregation until the 1870s, when many Quaker meetings were swept up in the revival movement. Members of Springfield were active in the founding of High Point Friends Meeting, Archale Friends Meeting and various other Quaker congregations in the area. The first full-time pastor, George Welker, was called to serve in 1914.

Springfield Friends were active for more than 200 years in North Carolina Yearly Meeting, and were instrumental in the founding of Quaker Lake Camp in Climax, NC. Following the breakup of the yearly meeting in 2017, Springfield Friends are now a part of the new North Carolina Fellowship of Friends.

== Famous members ==
Pastors at Springfield Friends Meeting
Pastor	Years
George Welker	1914-1918
Clara Cox	1918-1939
Tom Sykes, Don Conrad, Reuben Payne, Daryl Kent	1939-1941
Harold Hadley	1941-1944
Milton Hadley	1945-1951
Millard Jones	1951-1954
David Stanfield	1954-1961
Max Rees	1961-1996
Terry Venable	1997-2001
Ray Luther	2001-2014
Joshua Brown	2015-present

The Hunts, Tomlinsons, Englishes, Blairs, Picketts, Hocketts, Wrights, Mendenhalls and Coffins were among the early members of the meeting who contributed much to the work of Friends in the state. Nathan Hunt was one of the founders of the New Garden Boarding School (now Guilford College). Allen U. Tomlinson ran a small leather business before the Civil War and later started a small furniture shop. His descendants, Sidney and Charles Tomlinson, started the Tomlinson Chair Manufacturing Company, which helped to start High Point as one of the major center of furniture making in the U.S.

Myron “Red” Hayworth (1916-2006) was a professional baseball player, manager and scout. Byron Haworth, local attorney and Family Court judge, served as clerk of North Carolina Yearly Meeting from 1961-65 and later as clerk of Friends United Meeting. Racing driver Jimmie Lewallen (1919-1995) was one of the founders of NASCAR. Joseph Terrell is the lead singer for MIPSO, one of the top country/bluegrass bands in the country.

== Cemetery ==
The cemetery is to the west of the 1858 meetinghouse and has some of the oldest Quaker graves in the area. The first recorded burial was that of Mary Hoggatt in 1780. The cemetery is visited frequently by people doing genealogical research. The cemetery is under the care of the Springfield Memorial Association, founded in 1906, which also has care of the 1858 meetinghouse (The Museum of Old Domestic Life) and the Allen Jay house. A guidebook (revised in 2017) helps visitors locate graves and provides additional information where known.
