= Friends Spring Meeting House =

Historic church in North Carolina, United States

- U.S. National Register of Historic Places
- Location within North Carolina Location within the United States
- Location: 3323 E. Greensboro Chapel Hill Rd. (Jct. of SR 1005 and SR 2338), Snow Camp, North Carolina
- Coordinates: 35°54′7″N 79°19′34″W
- Area: 8 acres (3.2 ha)
- Built: 1907
- NRHP reference No.: 87000456
- Added to NRHP: March 19, 1987

Friends Spring Meeting House is a historic Quaker meeting house located in Snow Camp, Alamance County, North Carolina. The fourth and present meeting house, built in 1907, is a small, rectangular, one-story, gable-front frame building. It features Gothic Revival-style lancet windows and a short, plain rectangular cupola with a pyramidal roof.

Friends Spring Meeting remains an active congregation of Quakers from the Alamance, Chatham County, Orange County, Guilford County, and Randolph County area of North Carolina. Members of the Religious Society of Friends began “meeting at the spring” around 1761, and the congregation was formally recognized by the North Carolina Yearly Meeting in 1773. The adjacent contributing cemetery dates to about 1761, at the founding of the meeting. It contains graves of some of the earliest Quaker settlers in Alamance County, as well as unmarked graves of approximately 25 American Revolutionary War soldiers killed in the 1781 Battle of Lindley's Mill. The battle was fought around the meeting house, and Governor Thomas Burke and other officials were held prisoner in the original building during the engagement.

It was listed on the National Register of Historic Places in 1987.
