= Snow Camp, North Carolina =

- Unincorporated community
- Location within North Carolina Location within the United States
- Coordinates: 35°53′37″N 79°25′48″W
- Country: United States
- State: North Carolina
- County: Alamance
- Elevation: 600 ft (180 m)
- Time zone: UTC-5 (Eastern (EST))
  - Summer (DST): UTC-4 (EDT)
- ZIP code: 27349
- GNIS feature ID: 995060

Snow Camp is an unincorporated community in Alamance County, North Carolina, United States.

== History ==
The origin of the name of the community is disputed, but the most commonly accepted story as to how the name came about was that before the American Revolution a group of hunters from Pennsylvania camped there during a snowfall. The lesser accepted story is that General Cornwallis camped there during a snowfall around the time of the Battle of Guilford Court House.

Though quite small, Snow Camp is historically significant. Herman Husband, a leader in the Regulator Movement lived here. The Regulator Movement culminated in the Battle of Alamance prior to the Revolutionary War. During the Revolutionary War, battles were fought nearby at Lindley's Mill, Clapp's Mill, and at Pyle's Defeat.

Snow Camp was also a site of early Quaker settlement in North Carolina, as Friends from Pennsylvania migrated to the Cane Creek valley in the mid-1700s and established the Spring Meeting at Snow Camp. Several historic buildings clustered around the spring remain from that settlement.

The Hiram Braxton House, Friends Spring Meeting House, Camilus McBane House, and Snow Camp Mutual Telephone Exchange Building are listed on the National Register of Historic Places.

=== Simon Dixon ===
Simon A. Dixon (October 12, 1728 – April, 1781) was the founder and prominent member of the community of Snow Camp. He was also one of the founding members of the Cane Creek Friends Meeting, the first Quaker community in the Piedmont region of North Carolina.

Dixon migrated to the area from Lancaster County, Pennsylvania in approximately 1750. He set up a successful gristmill that operated into the 20th century. As a supporter of the resistance to Colonial taxation and as a member of the Regulator Movement, he was a signer of the Regulator Advertisement, and also was present at the Battle of Alamance in 1771. In 1781, his home and mill were briefly seized by General Charles Cornwallis as temporary quarters in the days following the Battle of Guilford Courthouse in 1781.

Simon Dixon is one of the main characters in the 1973 play, Sword of Peace, a dramatic portrayal of the struggles that Quakers faced during the American Revolutionary War. This play is performed by the Snow Camp Outdoor Theatre on a site located near his original dwelling.

== Notable person ==
- Joseph M. Dixon, Representative, Senator, and the seventh Governor of Montana

== See also ==
- Cane Creek Friends Meeting
