= Old Chappaqua Historic District =

Area of Chappaqua, New York, first settled by Quakers

- U.S. National Register of Historic Places
- U.S. Historic district
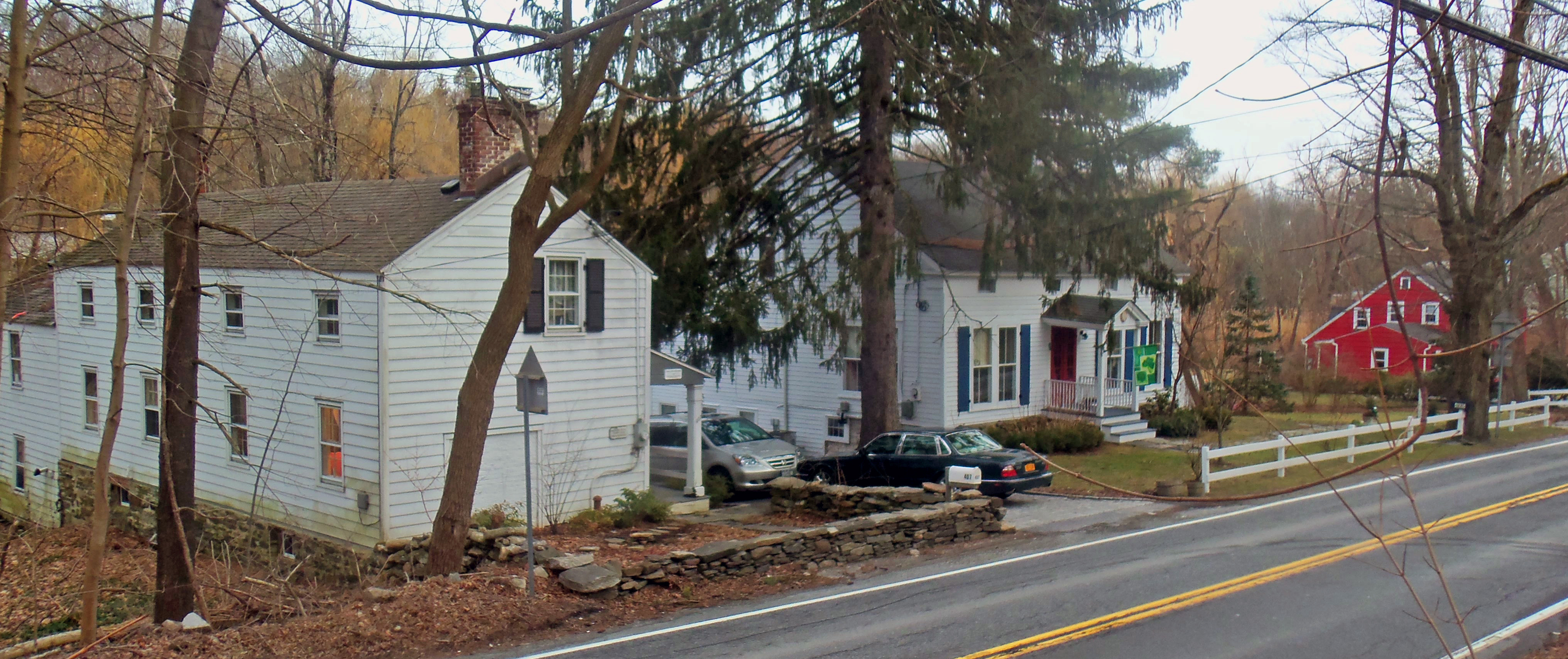
- Tenant house, house and currying shop for the Samuel Allen Farm, 2013

- Location within New York Location within the United States
- Location: Chappaqua, NY
- Nearest city: White Plains
- Coordinates: 41°10′23″N 73°46′38″W
- Area: 33 acres (13 ha)
- Built: 1753–1850
- NRHP reference No.: 74001319
- Added to NRHP: July 15, 1974

The Old Chappaqua Historic District is located along Quaker Road (New York State Route 120) in the town of New Castle, New York, United States, between the hamlets of Chappaqua and Millwood. It was the original center of Chappaqua, prior to the construction of the New York and Harlem Railroad and the erection of its station to the south in the mid-19th century. In 1974 it was recognized as a historic district and listed on the National Register of Historic Places.

What is today Chappaqua was first settled around 1740 by a group of Quakers from Long Island. They built the still-used Chappaqua Friends Meeting House, a Friends meeting house and the oldest known building in the town, around which the district centered a decade later. The other contributing properties, all timber frame buildings up and down the road on either side near the meeting house, are the surviving buildings from some of the farms established then and later. They have been preserved intact from that time.

== Geography ==
The district begins on the west side of the road, approximately 0.6 mi (1 km) north of downtown Chappaqua and the Saw Mill River Parkway interchange, at 332 Quaker Road, just opposite Commodore Road. It follows the south line of that lot, then a line consistent with the west line of that lot through Fair Ridge Cemetery up to 478 Quaker, then turns 100 ft (30 m) to follow the north line and cross the road to take in 485 Quaker. It turns south at the lot corner to create a corridor 450 feet (140 m) wide with the road at the center south back to 385 Quaker, just north of Chappaqua Mountain Road, where it returns west to the road and continues back to its southern boundary.

The terrain is hilly, forcing the road through some gentle curves as it passes through the district. Despite the extensive residential development in the area, it is still heavily wooded, with many tall trees shading the houses and few clearings. Streams in the area drain into the Saw Mill River, which rises in the woods to the east. Quaker Road climbs approximate 140 feet (43 m) from south to north through the district.

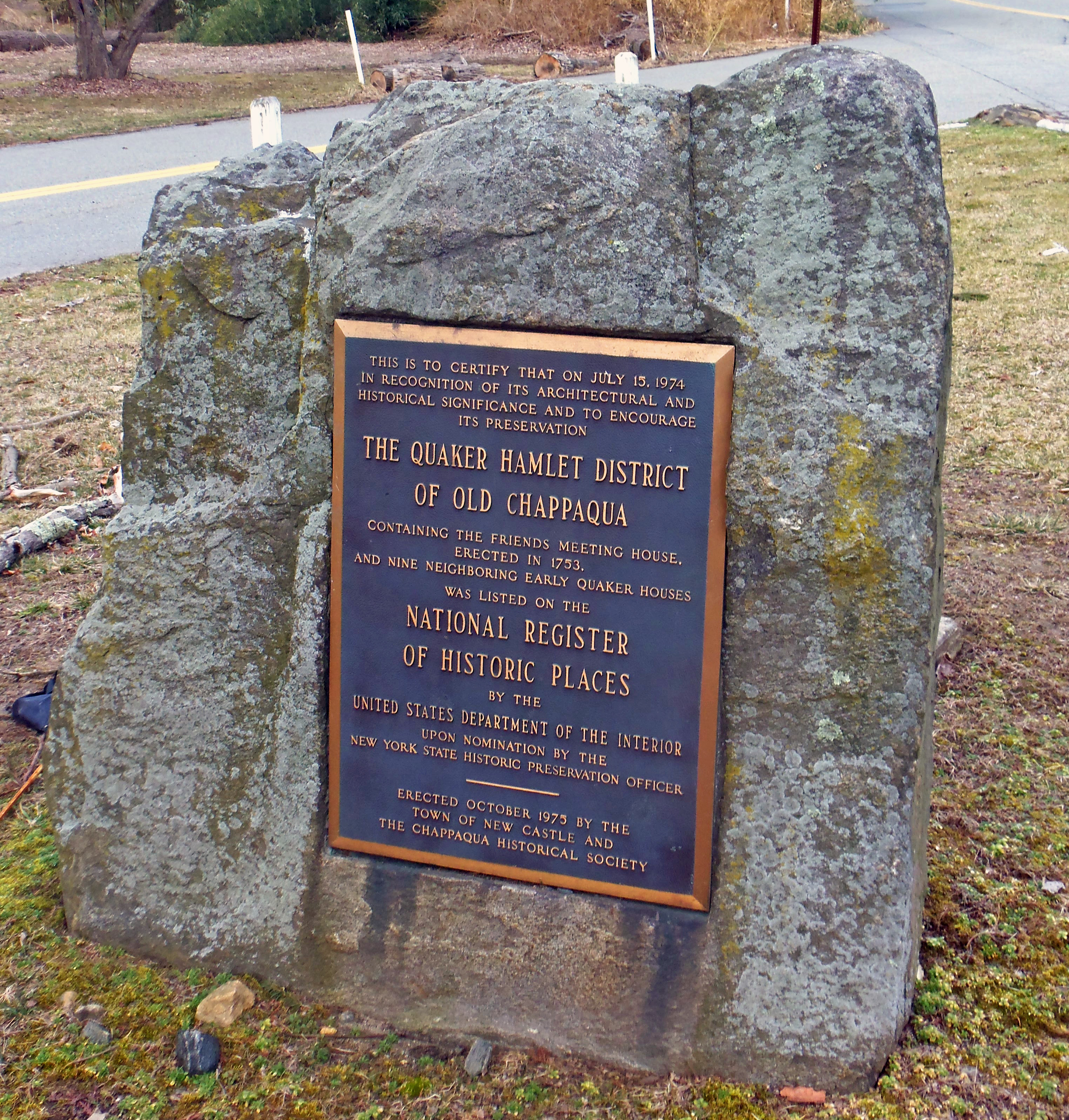
Marker at Chappaqua Mountain Road intersection

Within this boundary, along a 0.6-mile (1 km) stretch of Quaker, are 33 acres (13 ha) with 30 buildings, half of which are contributing properties. All of them, whether contributing or not, are wood frame houses of two to three stories with gabled roofs. Those of more modern construction are sympathetic to their historic neighbors. Except for the meeting house, all are still used as residences. In the middle of a small grassy island at the Chappaqua Mountain Road intersection is a rock with a commemorative plaque to the district attached.

== History ==
Quakers, fleeing religious persecution in England as Dissenters, settled in British colonies during the 17th century. One group established a meeting on Long Island in 1645. By the early 18th century their offshoots had crossed Long Island Sound to Westchester County, where they established Mamaroneck and Purchase by 1727.

In 1730, further offshoots of those groups moved further inland, to Wampus Pond (now Armonk) and "Shapequaw". Ten years later one of them, John Reynolds, established a 100-acre (40 ha) farm that included the area of the future district, along Quaker Road from Kipp Street to Roaring Brook Road. By 1747 there were enough Quakers in Shapequaw that they began petitioning the Purchase meeting to establish their own. Permission was granted shortly thereafter, and Reynolds donated two of his acres (8,100 m^{2}) to the group so it could build a meeting house and burial ground.

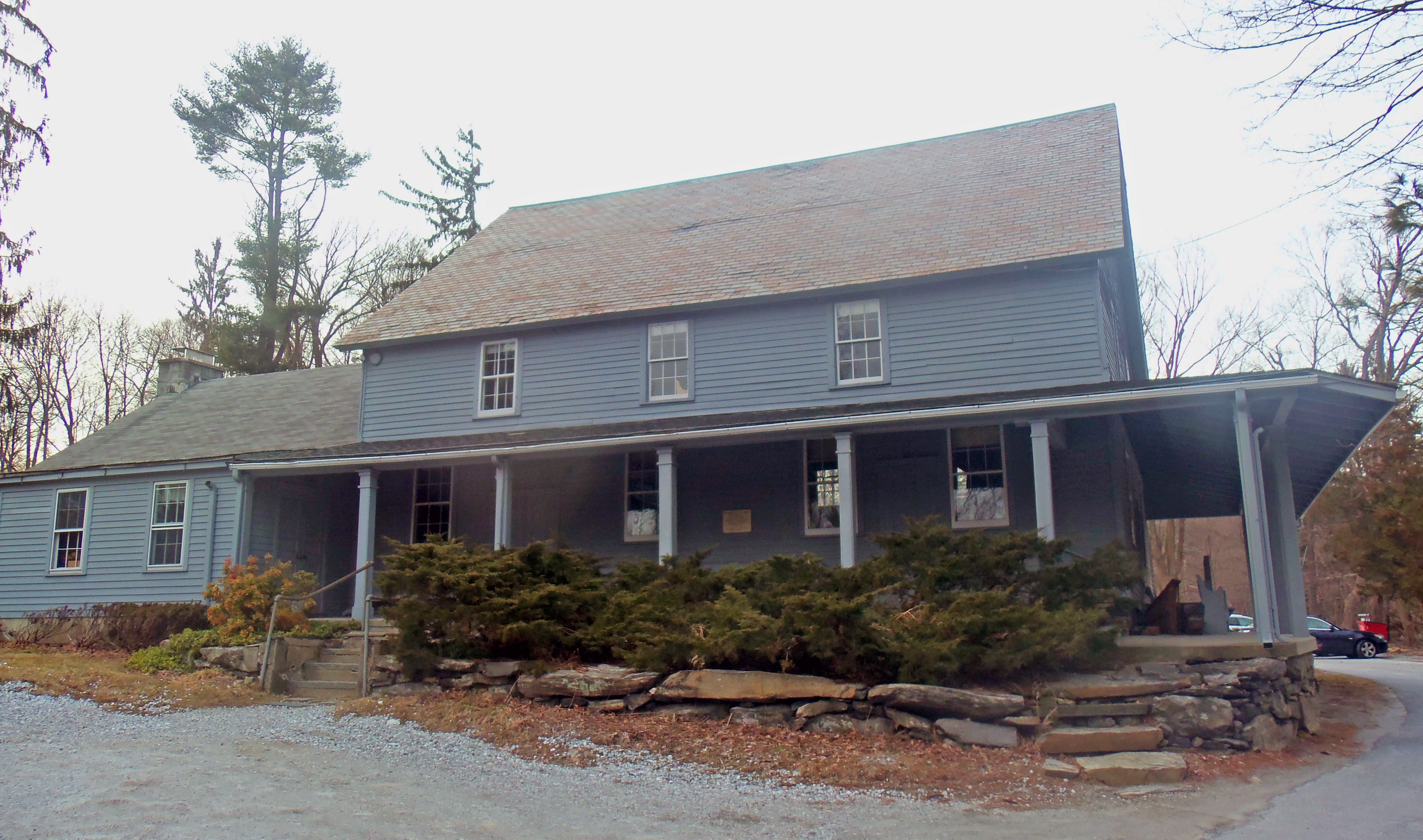
The meeting house

By 1753 the meeting house was finished. In 1776 it would serve as a hospital for Continental Army soldiers injured at the nearby Battle of White Plains. Two years later a wing was built on it.

The original Reynolds farm was eventually subdivided. Other farmers, like Samuel Allen and Elnathan Thorn, built houses near the meeting house. By 1825 the area had become the community of what was now known as Chappaqua. The residents were largely self-sufficient farmers with side businesses as craftsmen.

That ended with the construction of the New York and Harlem Railroad (still in use today as Metro-North Railroad's Harlem Line) in 1846. It followed the river valley, and so the station was built a mile (1.6 km) south of the meeting house. Gradually that area became developed and grew into the downtown Chappaqua that exists today. Allen built a couple of small houses across the road from the meeting house, and cabinetmaker Henry Dodge built a large house at what is today 386 Quaker, moving the older Thorn house in the process. That was the last development in the district related to the original Quaker settlers and their families.

As the railroad spurred the suburbanization of northern Westchester in the later 19th and early 20th centuries, the meeting house and associated farm buildings remained in use. However, the economy changed. With the railroad close by, the farmers switched to growing cash crops for the New York City market, and sold some of their larger landholdings.

Some buildings, such as the outbuildings on the Thorn–Dodge property, were destroyed by the 1904 tornado. New construction in the district did not replace any of the historic structures. In 1961 another wing was added to the meeting house. There have been few other changes to the older buildings since then.

== Significant contributing properties ==
Among the contributing properties, several are particularly important in the context of the district. None have yet been listed individually on the National Register, but they are all local landmarks, carrying markers indicating what they are and their year of construction.

- Samuel Allen Farm, 400, 401–407 Quaker Road. Four buildings remain standing from this farm established sometime before 1820; all were built by 1852. The currying shop, 400, is on the west side, with the main house, tenant house and an old barn. All are similar buildings, four bays wide and from one-and-a-half to two stories high.

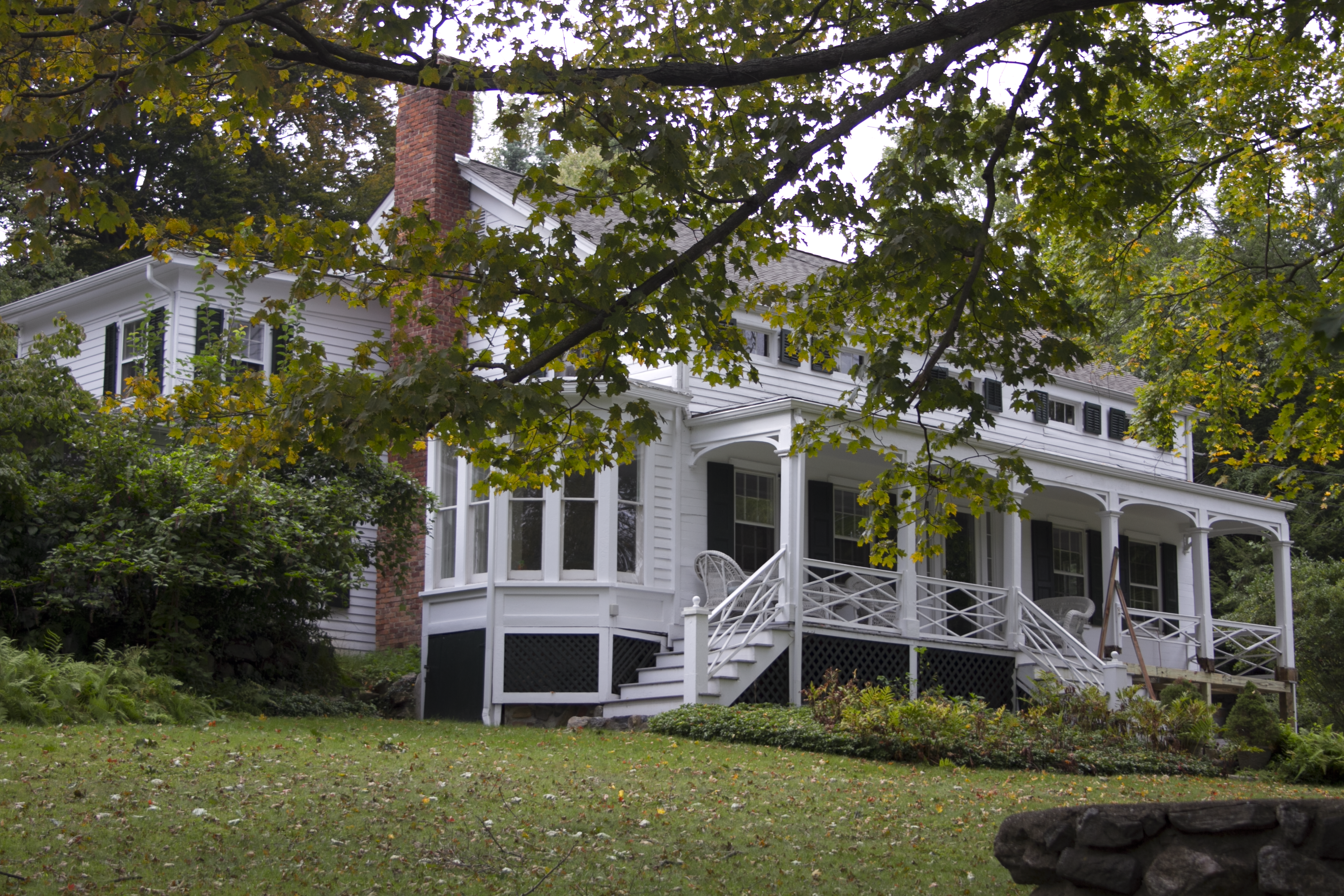
Thomas Dodge House

- Thomas Dodge House, 428 Quaker Road. Cabinetmaker Thomas Dodge and his wife Hannah, later inhabitants of the early settlement, built this three-by-two-bay house. Since it is on sloping ground, it is two stories on the east but only one and a half on the west.
- Meeting House, 420 Quaker Road. Located on a slight rise above the road, immediately to the west of the Allen properties, the meeting house is a two-story clapboard-sided gabled structure with a full verandah around the south and east. Inside, chamfered wooden posts support a gallery on three sides. It is the oldest known building in the town of New Castle, dating to 1753.
- Reynolds–Carpenter Farmhouse, 332 Quaker Road. The southern end of the district is anchored by this five-bay, two-story gabled house, one of two likely built for one of Reynolds' seven sons. Its rear wing was added in 1850 by Robert Carpenter. North of it is a barn from the same era, now used as a garage.
- Stony Hollow Farmhouse, 478 Quaker Road. This house-and-barn combination is located at the north end of the district. The clapboard-sided house contrasts with the shingled barn, but both are believed to have been built around 1820, with the house expanded later in the 19th century.

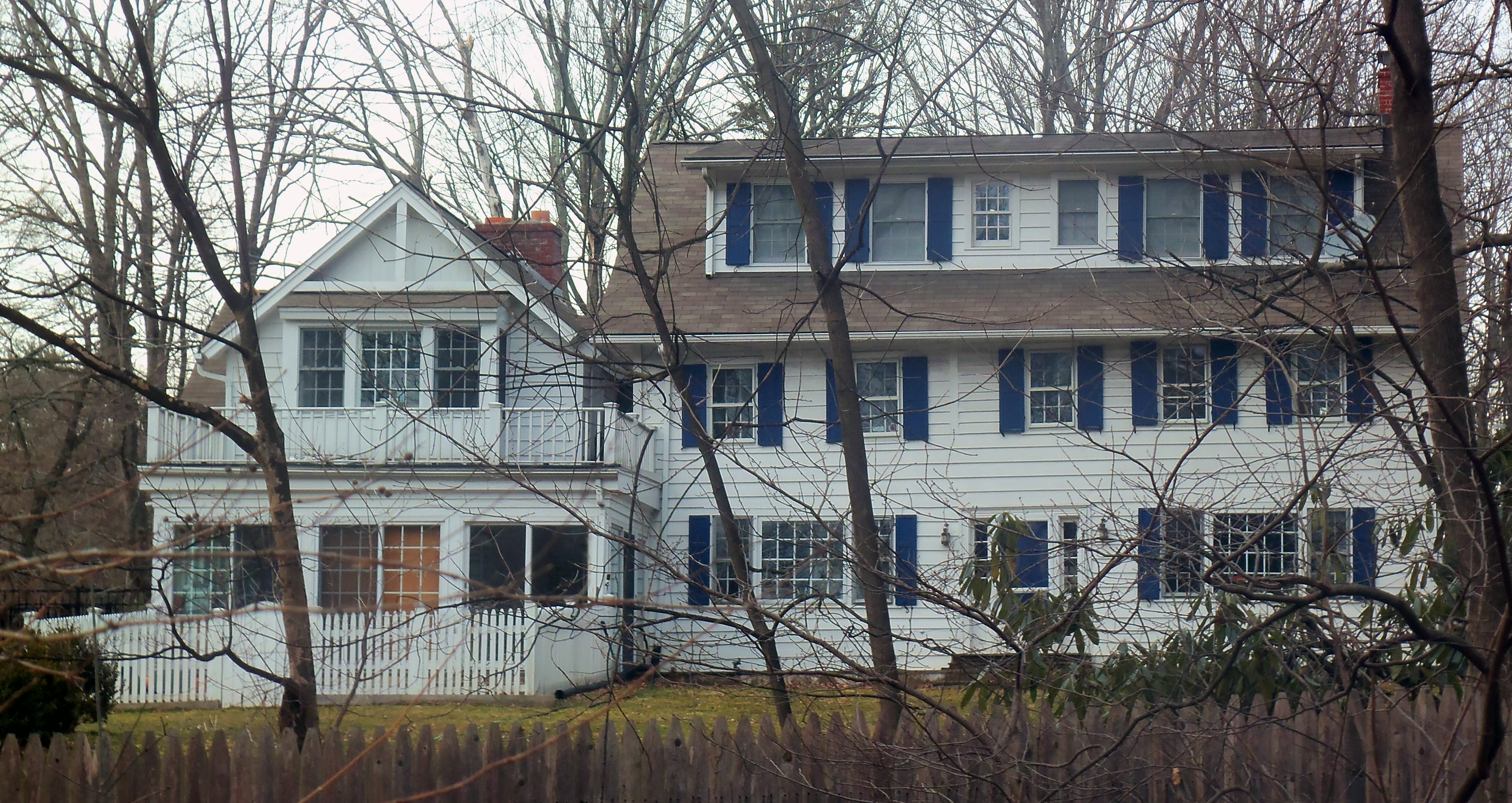
Sutton–Reynolds House

- Sutton–Reynolds House, 354 Quaker Road. Situated to the north of the Reynolds–Carpenter House, this similarly sized house is also believed to have been built by Reynolds for another of his sons. It is distinguished by the two chimneys that rise from either end.
- Thorn–Dodge House, 386 Quaker Road. The rear wing of this five-by-two-bay two-story clapboard-sided gabled house is the original structure built by Elnathan Thorn. Henry Dodge moved it here when he built the current house in 1852.

== Preservation ==
While New Castle's zoning does not include any special measures for the district, the town has other measures to protect and preserve it. Most prominently, all of the historic properties within the historic district have been designated town landmarks.

The town's historic preservation ordinances provide for the designation of local landmarks. A Landmarks Advisory Committee, consisting of the town historian and four residents with an interest in preservation and development appointed by the town board to three-year terms, guides the town in not only its designation of landmarks but the preservation of those already designated. Any change to an existing landmark's exterior must be approved by the committee. As allowed under New York state law, property tax exemptions are available to any owner of a landmark who restores or rehabilitates it, if they have been approved in advance by the committee and the town assessor certifies that they were finished as planned.

== See also ==
- List of Quaker meeting houses
- National Register of Historic Places listings in northern Westchester County, New York
