= Friends Meetinghouse and School =

Church in Brooklyn, New York

- U.S. National Register of Historic Places
- New York City Landmark
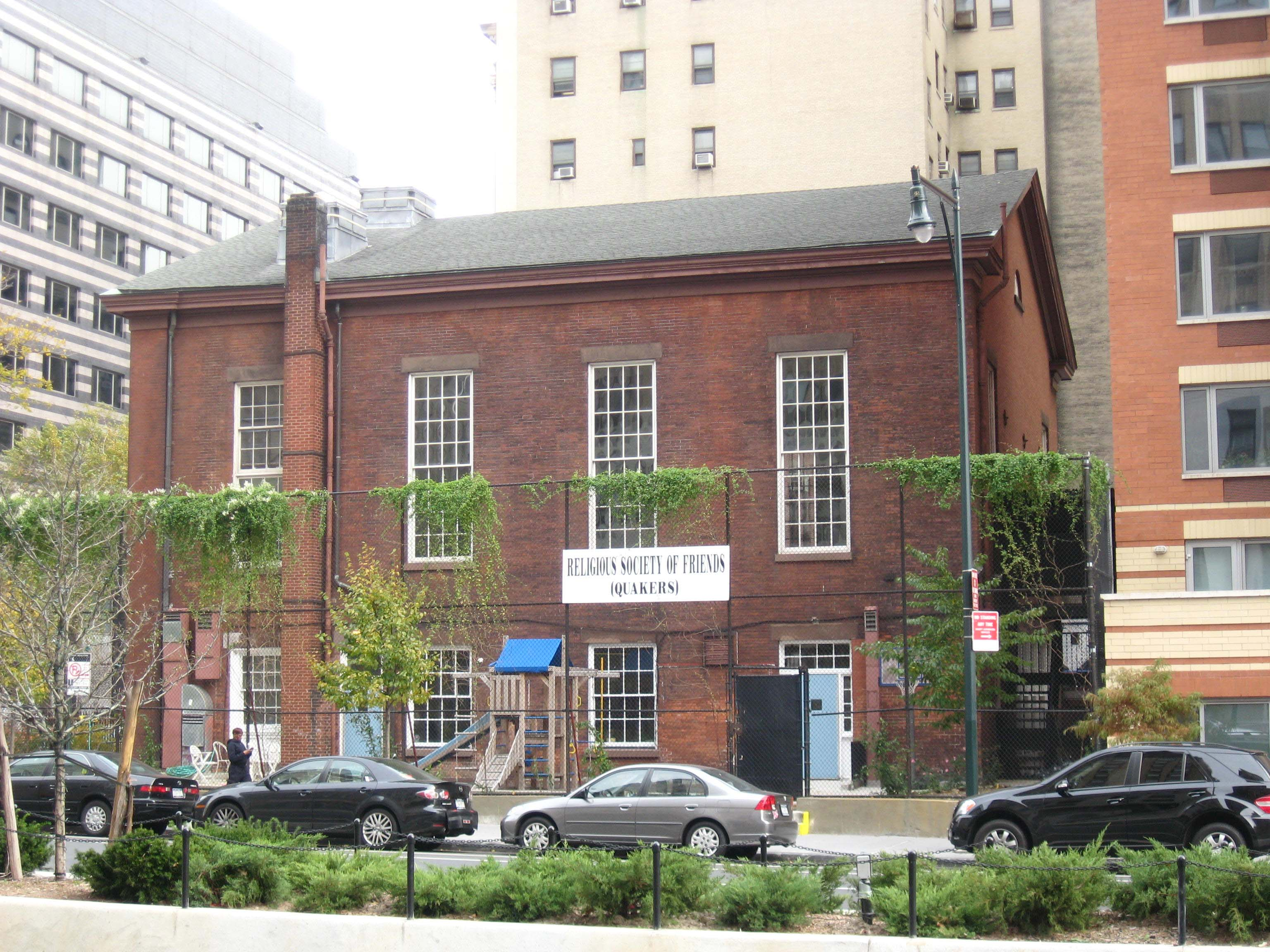
- 1857 meetinghouse at 110 Schermerhorn Street (November 2008)

- Location within New York City Location within New York Location within the United States
- Location: 110 Schermerhorn Street; Brooklyn, New York City
- Coordinates: 40°41′24″N 73°59′23″W
- Built: 1857
- Architect: Charles T. Bunting (attributed); William Tubby
- Architectural style: Classical Revival, Greek Revival
- NRHP reference No.: 82001179
- NYCL No.: 2005

Significant dates
- Added to NRHP: November 4, 1982
- Designated NYCL: October 27, 1981

The Friends Meetinghouse and School is a Quaker meeting house and adjacent school building at the corner of Schermerhorn Street and Boerum Place in the Boerum Hill neighborhood of Brooklyn, New York City.

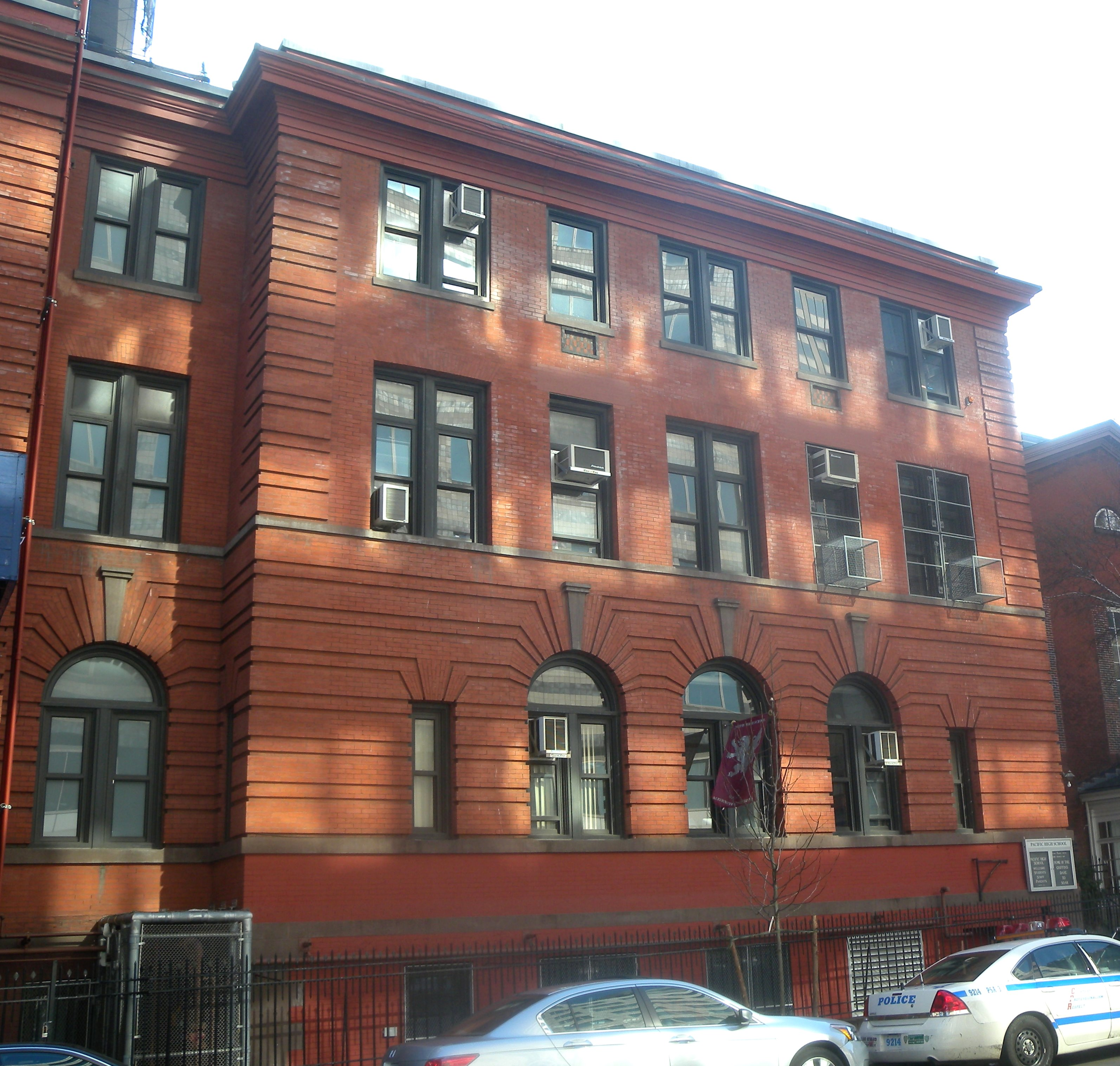
The school at 112 Schermerhorn St. was built in 1902

The meeting house, at 110 Schermerhorn Street, was built in 1857 and is a 3 1/2-story building built of red brick with brownstone details. Its design is attributed to Charles T. Bunting.

The school, located at 112 Schermerhorn Street, was built in 1902 and is a three-story red brick building located adjacent to the meeting house, at 112 Schermerhorn Street. It was designed by William Tubby, a prominent Brooklyn architect, to house the Brooklyn Friends School. Tubby was himself a Quaker and an early graduate of the school.

The meeting house remains in regular use as a house of worship by the Brooklyn Meeting of the Religious Society of Friends. The Brooklyn Friends School moved to another site nearby in 1973. As of 2015, the school building houses Brooklyn Frontiers High School, an alternative school operated by the New York City Department of Education.

The meeting house was designated a New York City landmark in 1981, and the meeting house and school together were listed on the National Register of Historic Places in 1982.
