= Trenton Friends Meeting House =

Historic meetinghouse in New Jersey, United States

- U.S. National Register of Historic Places
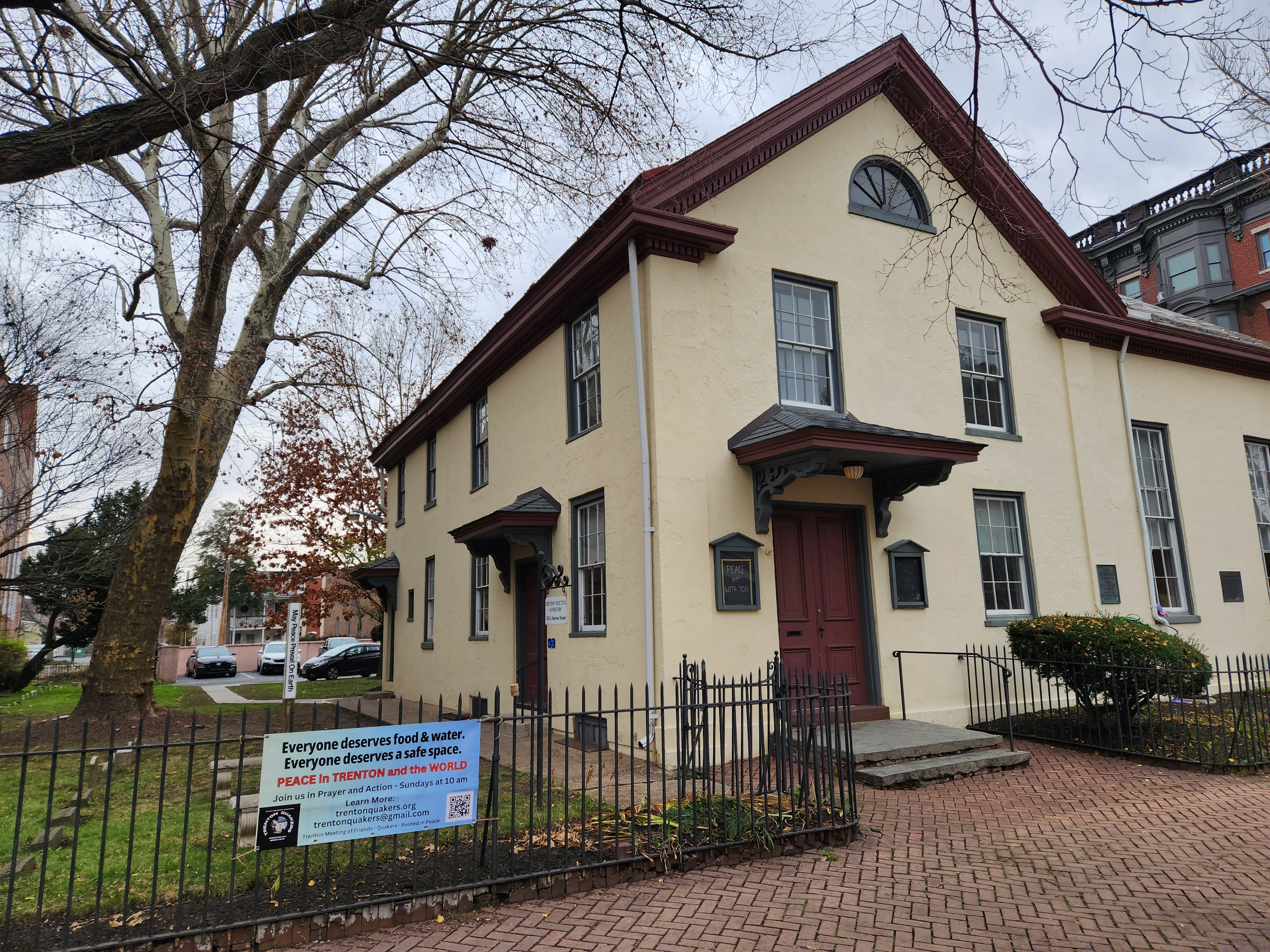

- Location within Mercer County, New Jersey Location within New Jersey Location within the United States
- Location: 142 E. Hanover Street, Trenton, New Jersey
- Coordinates: 40.2214°N 74.76232°W
- Area: less than one acre
- Built: 1739
- Architect: Plasket, William; Fuhrman, George
- Architectural style: Italianate, Colonial Revival
- NRHP reference No.: 08000362
- Added to NRHP: April 30, 2008

Trenton Friends Meeting House is a historic Quaker meeting house at 142 E. Hanover Street in Trenton, Mercer County, New Jersey, United States.

The Trenton Quaker Meeting House dates back to 1739. It was occupied by the British Dragoons in 1776, and by the Continental Army later in the Revolutionary War. On July 15, 1776, a meeting of the Provincial Congress (afterwards given the title “Convention of the State of New Jersey”) held in the Trenton Friends Meeting House.

The Meeting House has been in continuous use by Quakers in and around Trenton ever since it was built. It was added to the National Register of Historic Places in 2008.

== See also ==
- National Register of Historic Places listings in Mercer County, New Jersey
