= Cropwell, New Jersey =

Populated place in Burlington County, New Jersey, US

- Unincorporated community
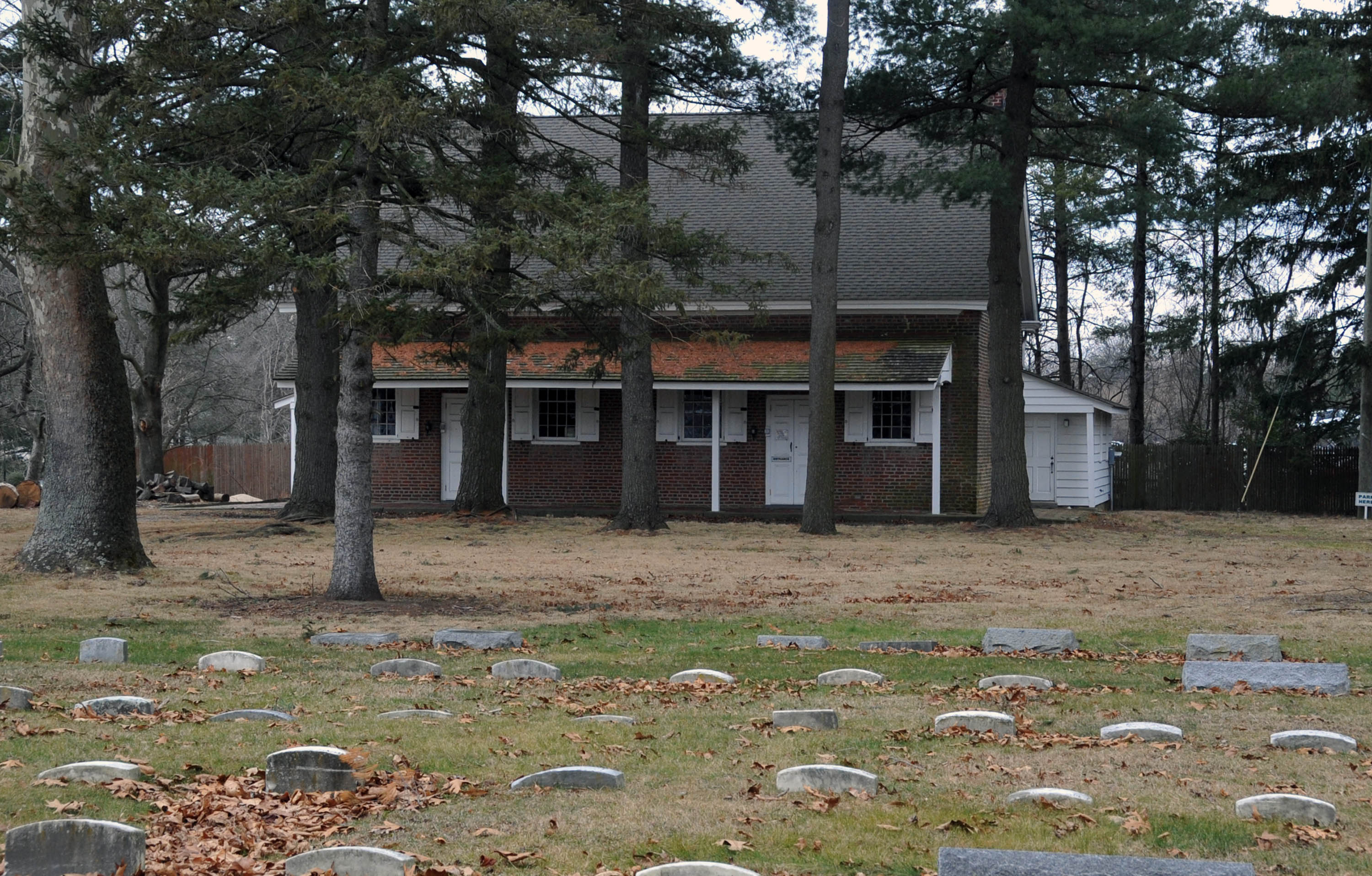
- Cropwell Friends Meeting House

- Location of Cropwell in Burlington County (Inset: Location of county within the state of New Jersey) Cropwell (New Jersey) Cropwell (the United States)
- Coordinates: 39°53′37″N 74°56′08″W
- Country: United States
- State: New Jersey
- County: Burlington
- Township: Evesham
- Elevation: 89 ft (27 m)
- Time zone: UTC−05:00 (Eastern (EST))
  - Summer (DST): UTC−04:00 (EDT)
- Area code: 856
- GNIS feature ID: 875740

Cropwell is an unincorporated community located within Evesham Township in Burlington County, in the U.S. state of New Jersey. It is the location of the Cropwell Friends Meeting House.

== Transportation ==
New Jersey Transit provides service to and from Philadelphia on the 406 route.
