= Cropwell Friends Meeting House =

- U.S. National Register of Historic Places
- New Jersey Register of Historic Places
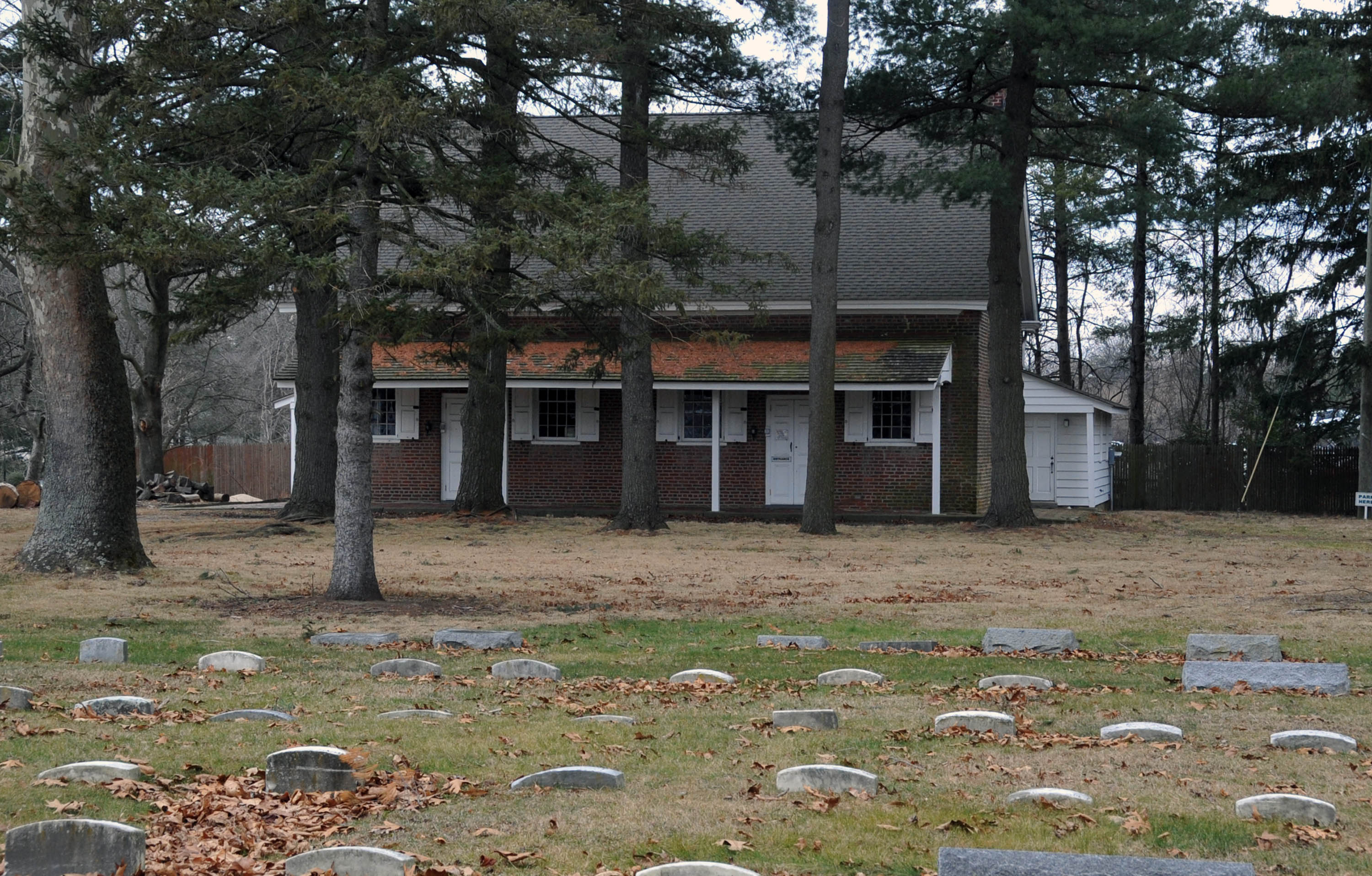
- The Meeting House and cemetery in 2013

- Location within Burlington County, New Jersey Location within New Jersey Location within the United States
- Location: 810 Cropwell Road, Evesham Township, New Jersey
- Coordinates: 39°53′35.2″N 74°56′13.1″W
- Area: 2 acres (0.81 ha)
- Built: 1793
- MPS: Historic Resources of Evesham Township MPDF
- NRHP reference No.: 92000976
- NJRHP No.: 795

Significant dates
- Added to NRHP: August 14, 1992
- Designated NJRHP: June 25, 1992

The Cropwell Friends Meeting House is located at 810 Cropwell Road in the Cropwell section of Evesham Township in Burlington County, New Jersey, United States. The historic Quaker meeting house was added to the National Register of Historic Places on August 14, 1992, for its significance in architecture. It was listed as part of the Historic Resources of Evesham Township, New Jersey, Multiple Property Submission (MPS).

Thomas Evans was one of the first Friends to settle in the Marlton area; in 1701, he signed a deed with Lenape leader King Himolin for a farm in what is now the Marlton area. The property for a school was acquired in 1793 and the meetinghouse constructed in 1809. An active Quaker congregation continues to worship in the building.

== See also ==
- National Register of Historic Places listings in Burlington County, New Jersey
