= Friends meeting house =

Meeting house of the Religious Society of Friends (Quakers)

Notable meeting houses

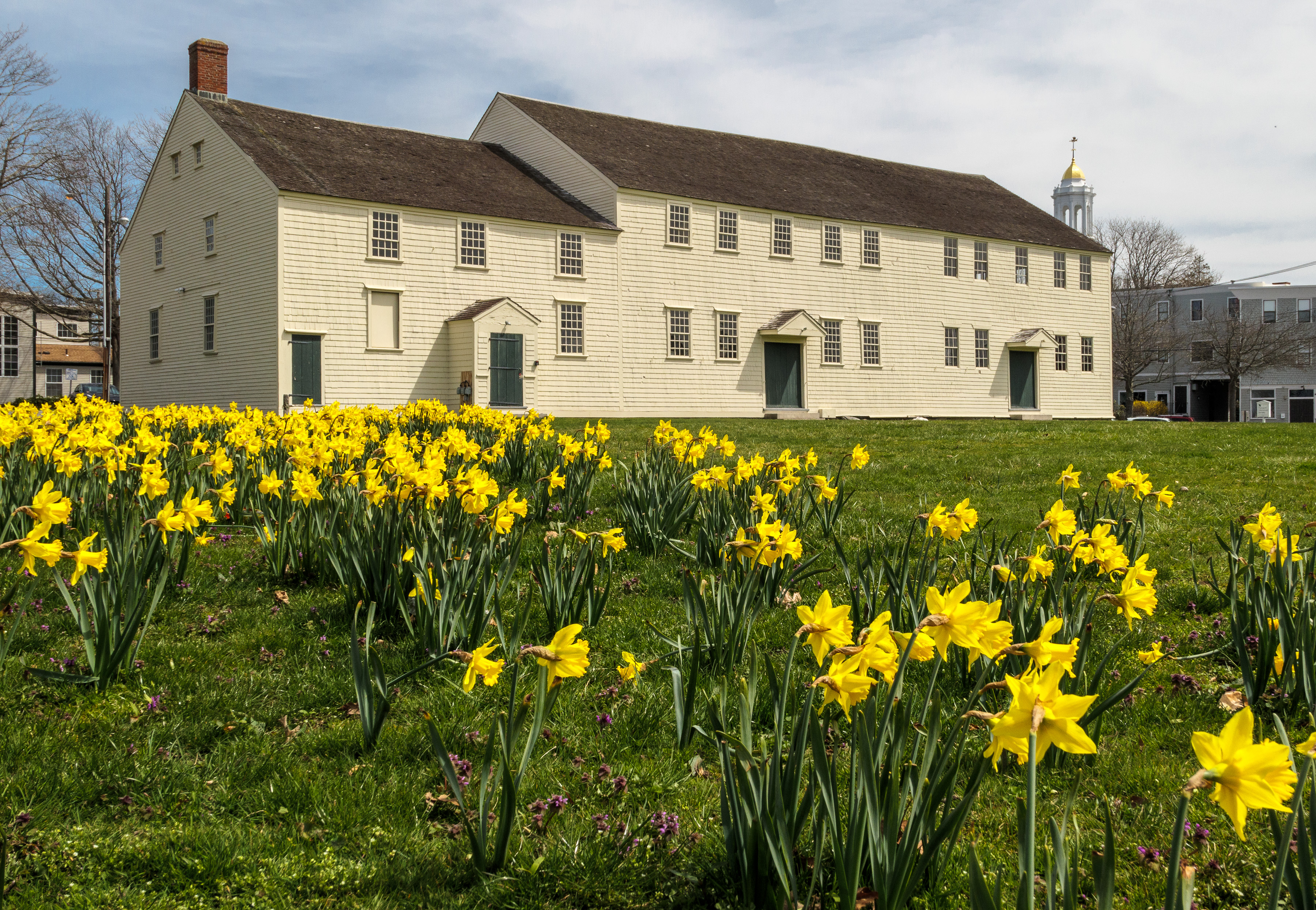
The Great Friends Meeting House in Newport, Rhode Island was built in 1699 and hosted the New England Yearly Meeting until 1905

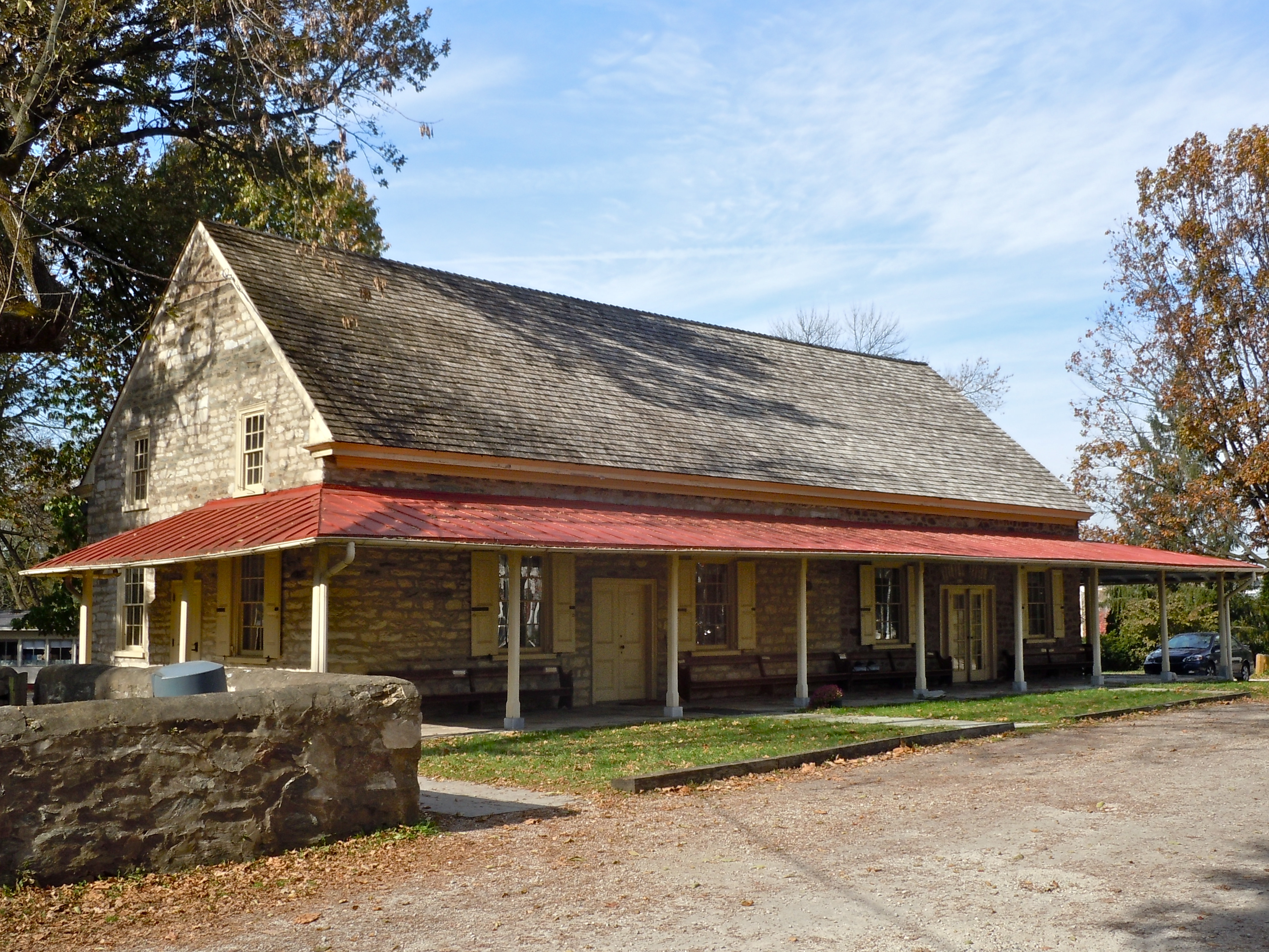
Plymouth Friends Meetinghouse, in Montgomery County, Pennsylvania, built 1708; porch added 1867

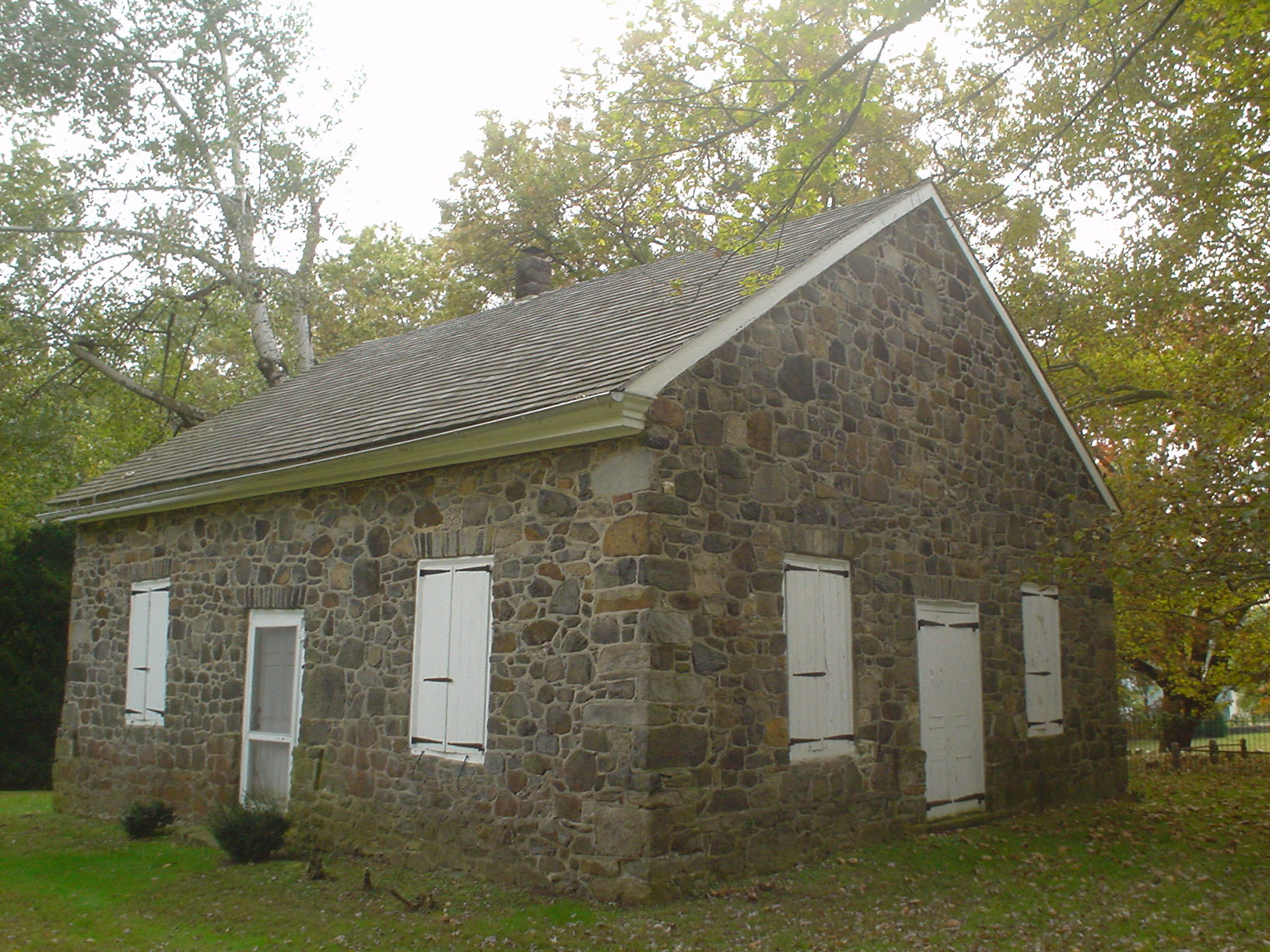
Chichester Friends Meeting House near Philadelphia, built 1769

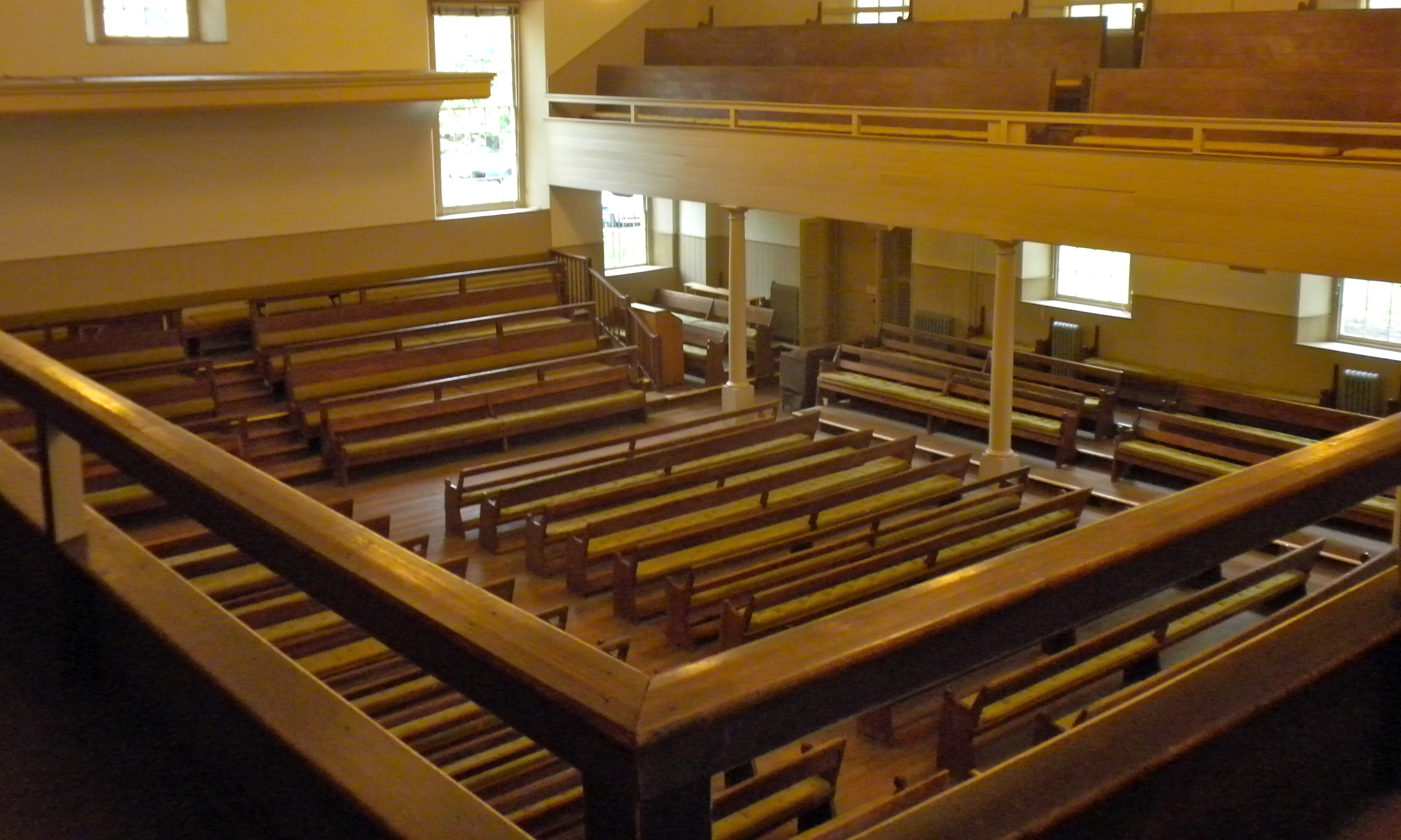
Interior of the Arch Street Friends Meeting House in Philadelphia, built 1805

A Friends meeting house is a meeting house of the Religious Society of Friends (Quakers), where meeting for worship is usually held.

Typically, Friends meeting houses are simple and resemble local residential buildings. Ornamentation, spires, and steeples are usually avoided.

When Quakers speak of a "church," it generally refers to the persons of the worshipping community, rather than the building itself.

== History ==
Generally, Quakers believe that meeting for worship can occur in any place - not just in a designated meeting house. Quakers have quoted Matthew 18:20 to support this: "Where two or three meet together in my name, there [is God] in the midst of them." Therefore, theoretically, meeting for worship may be held anywhere.

Before the advent of meeting houses, Quakers met for worship outdoors, in homes, or in local buildings.

In the late 17th century, Welsh Quaker Richard Davies (1635–1708) described his experience meeting Friends outdoors:

I went to visit [four] young men, my former companions in profession of religion. Two of them were convinced [Quakers]...we agreed to meet together; but none of us had a house of his own to meet in. We determined therefore to meet on a hill in a common, as near as we could for the convenience of each other, we living some miles apart. There we met in silence, to the wonder of the country. When the rain and the weather beat upon us on one side of the hill, we went to the other side. We were not free to go into any neighbours' enclosures, for they were so blind, dark, and ignorant, that they looked upon us as witches, and would go away from us, some crossing themselves with their hands about their foreheads and faces.

In 1662, John Bowne was arrested by Peter Stuyvesant for holding Quaker worship at his 1661 house in Flushing, Queens, then part of New Netherland. Bowne was deported to Holland and placed before a panel from the Dutch West India Company. After claiming that the Dutch colony had reached a religious-freedom agreement with his community, Bowne was set free. Two years later in 1664, the British took control of New Amsterdam and promised more religious freedom for colonists.

Perhaps due to the growth of the Religious Society of Friends, need for non-profit tax-exempt status, or due to discrimination, there arose a need for buildings to house meetings.

In 1670, Friends in England built the first worship-purposed meeting house. The Hertford Meeting House is located in 48 Railway Street, Hertford. This is the oldest Quaker building in the world, still in use for worship meetings. It was thrice visited by Quaker founder George Fox.

In December 1672, while traveling in Wales, Fox stated that his group "had a large meeting in the justice's barn, for [the justice's] house could not hold the company." This shows that holding meeting for worship at home was common in areas where a meeting house was not available.

In 1682, the Third Haven Meeting House in Talbot County, Maryland was built. This is considered the oldest surviving Friends meeting house in America.

Some Friends meeting houses were adapted from existing structures, but most were purpose-built. The 1675 Brigflatts Meeting House in Cumbria, England is an example of the latter. The hallmark of a meeting house is extreme simplicity and the absence of any liturgical symbols. More specifically, though, the defining characteristics of the Quaker meetinghouse are simplicity, equality, community, and peace. Though never explicitly written or spoken about, these tenets (or "Testimonies") of Quakerism were the basic, and only, guidelines for building a meetinghouse, as was seen through the continuity of the use of Testimonies within meetinghouse design. While meetinghouse design evolved over time to a standardization of the double-cell structure without explicit guidelines for building, the meeting house's reflective architecture revealed a deeper meaning. The meeting house design manifested and enhanced Quaker Testimonies and the cultivation of the Inner Light that was essential to Friends. Quakers easily moved from one place of meeting to another, but when given the opportunity to design and construct their own place of meeting, Friends infused their Testimonies in the planning, design, and construction of the building.

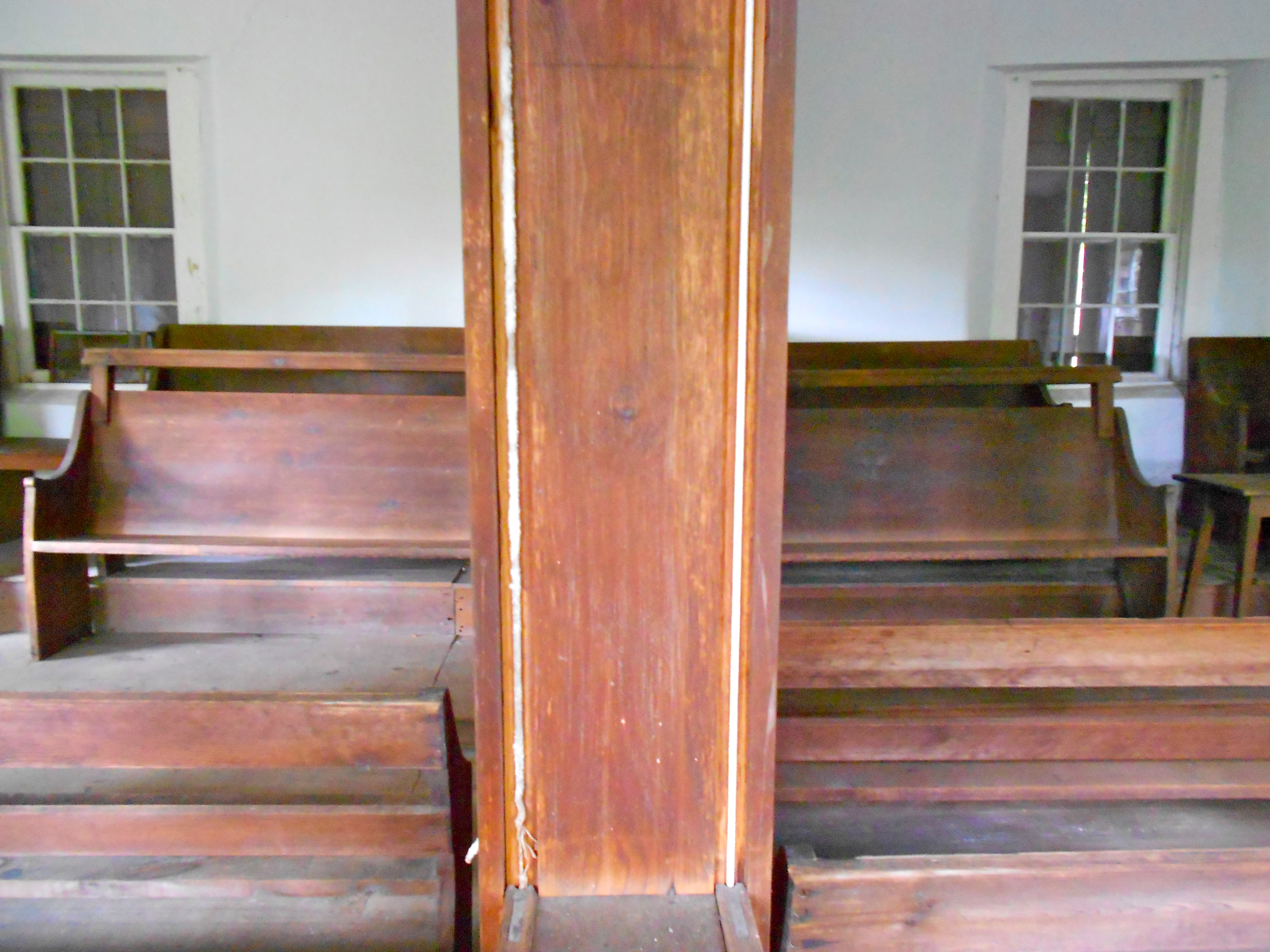
Interior of the Colora Meetinghouse in Maryland, showing the facing benches and the moveable divider typical of 18th and 19th century meetinghouses in the area

== Description ==
Quaker meeting houses generally lack spires, steeples, and other architectural decorations to embrace simplicity. Colonial American Quakers built meeting houses that resembled residential homes to display the building's role in the community, avoiding "churchly" ornamentation.

While imprisoned for his beliefs in 1665, Quaker founder George Fox had a conversation wherein he explained "church" terminology and derided steeples:

George Fox: "What dost thou call the church?"
Dr. Cradock: "Why, that which you call the meeting house."
George Fox: "Has Christ shed his blood for the steeple-house; and purchased and sanctified the steeple-house with his love? And seeing the church is Christ's bride and wife, and that he is the head of the church, dost thou think the steeple-house is Christ's wife and bride, and that he is the head of that old house, or of his people?"
Dr. Cradock: "No, Christ is the head of the people, and they are the church."
George Fox: "Then but you have given the title "church," which belongs to the people, to an old house, and you have taught the people to believe so."

The meeting house/church distinction is shared by a number of other non-conformist Christian denominations, including Unitarians, Christadelphians, the Church of Jesus Christ of Latter-day Saints (Mormons), and Mennonites.

Meeting Houses built in a traditional style usually had two meeting rooms: one for the main meeting for worship, and another where the women's business meeting may be held (often referred to as the women's meeting room). Meeting houses of this style usually have a minister's gallery at one end of the meeting room, where traditionally those traveling in the ministry would have sat, with an elders bench immediately in front of this. Wooden benches facing this occupy the rest of the room, often with a gallery for extra seating. Meeting houses of this style usually have high windows so that worshippers sitting in a meeting for worship cannot see outside.

Meeting houses built in a more modern design will usually consist of: a large meeting room, smaller rooms for committees, children's classes, etc., a kitchen and toilets.

The meeting room itself is a place for Friends to withdraw from the world. The windows are set sufficiently high that worshippers will not be distracted by the activities of the world's people outside, or in some cases they provide a view into the meeting house garden. The seating was originally long, hard and wooden. Today it is usually separate chairs but the layout remains the same – a square or rectangle facing inwards to a central table.

== Examples ==
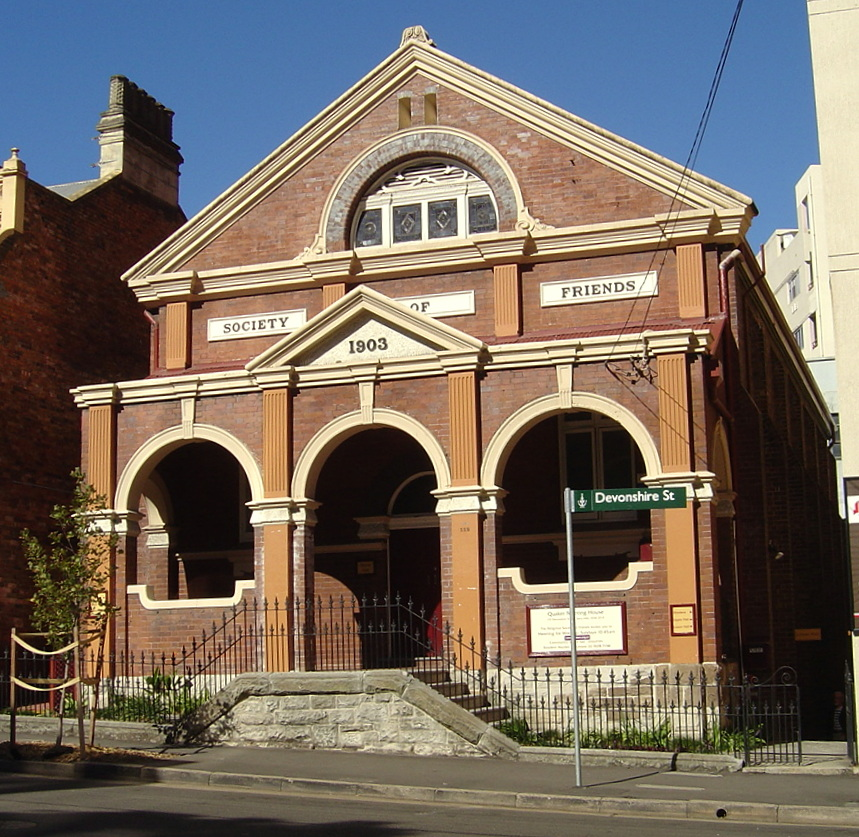
Sydney Friends meeting house

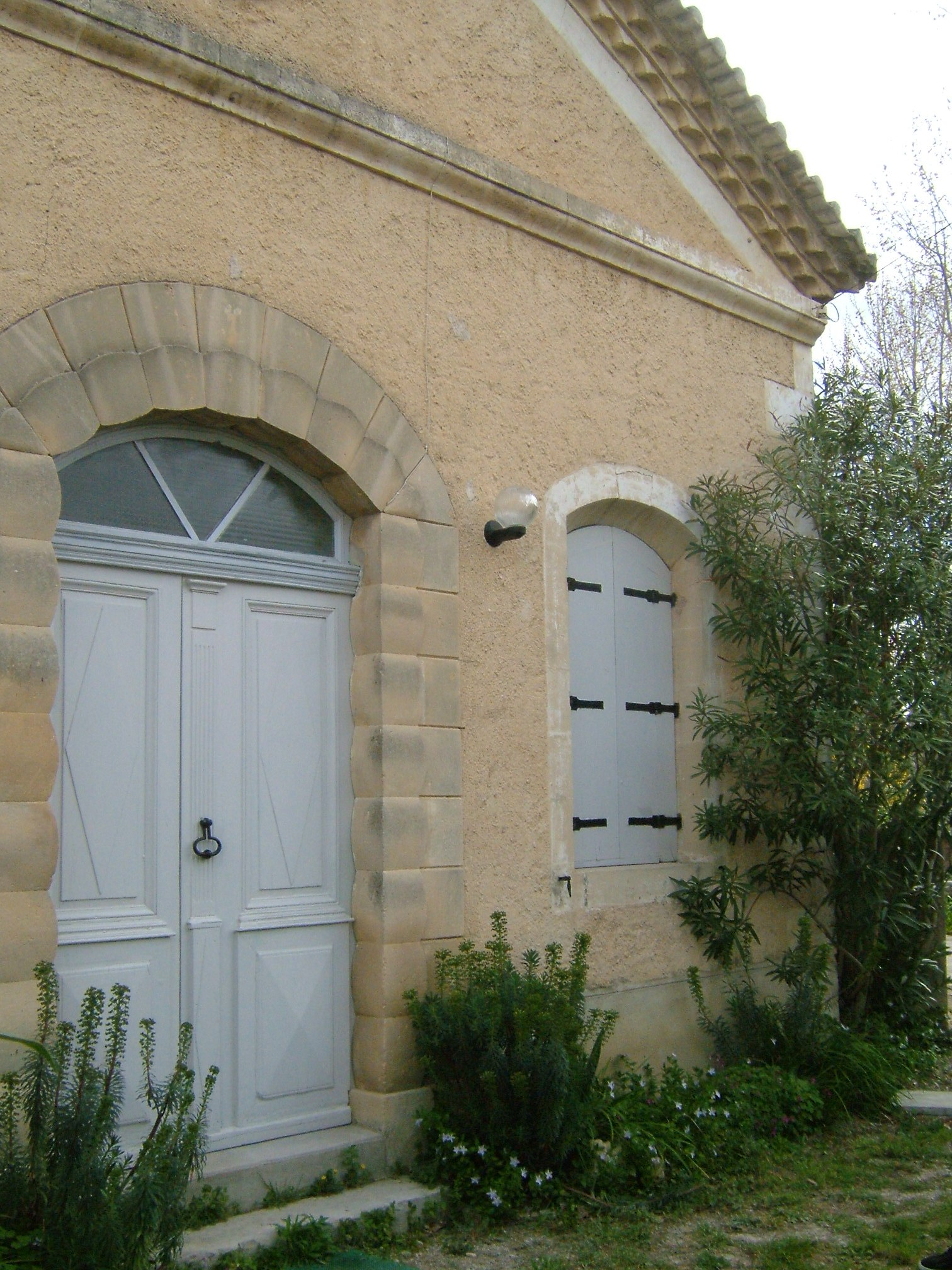
The Quaker Meeting House in Congénies, France

=== Australia ===
- Friends Meeting House, Adelaide

=== France ===
- The historic meeting house of Congénies (Southern France), since 1788

=== Ireland ===
- Quaker Meetinghouse, Moate, County Westmeath
- Friends Meeting House, 4–5 Eustace Street, Dublin

=== United States ===
- Abington Friends Meeting House, Montgomery County, Pennsylvania
- Alloways Creek Friends Meetinghouse, Hancock's Bridge, Lower Alloways Creek Township, Salem County, New Jersey
- Amesbury Friends Meeting House
- Appoquinimink Friends Meetinghouse, Odessa, Delaware
- Arch Street Friends Meeting House, Philadelphia, Pennsylvania
- Arney's Mount Friends Meetinghouse and Burial Ground, Burlington County, New Jersey
- Beekman Meeting House and Friends' Cemetery, LaGrangeville, New York
- Benjaminville Friends Meeting House, McLean County, Illinois
- Birmingham Orthodox Meeting House, Birmingham Township, Chester County, Pennsylvania
- John Bowne House, Flushing, New York, 1661
- Bradford Friends Meetinghouse (Marshallton Meeting House), Marshallton, West Bradford Township, Chester County, Pennsylvania
- Brooklyn Friends Meetinghouse and School, Downtown Brooklyn, New York, New York
- Caln Meeting House, Caln Township, Chester County, Pennsylvania
- Camden Friends Meetinghouse, Camden, Delaware
- Catawissa Friends Meetinghouse, Catawissa, Columbia County, Pennsylvania
- Centre Meeting and Schoolhouse, Centerville, New Castle County, Delaware
- Chappaqua Friends Meeting House, Westchester County, NY built in 1754
- Chichester Friends Meetinghouse, near Boothwyn, Upper Chichester Township, Delaware County, Pennsylvania
- Clinton Corners Friends Church, Clinton Corners, Dutchess County, New York
- Colora Meetinghouse, Colora, Cecil County, Maryland
- Conanicut Friends Meetinghouse, Conanicut Island, Jamestown, Newport County, Rhode Island
- Concord Friends Meetinghouse, Concordville, Delaware County, Pennsylvania
- Concord Hicksite Friends Meeting House, east of Colerain, Belmont County, Ohio
- Cornwall Friends Meeting House
- Creek Meeting House and Friends' Cemetery, Clinton Corners, Dutchess County, New York
- Crum Elbow Meeting House and Cemetery, East Park, Dutchess County, New York
- Darby Friends, Darby, Delaware County, Pennsylvania
- Deer Creek Friends Meetinghouse, Darlington, Harford County, Maryland
- Deep River Friends Meeting House and Cemetery, High Point, North Carolina
- Dover, NH Friends Meetinghouse, Dover, Strafford County, New Hampshire
- East Hoosac Quaker Meetinghouse, Adams, Berkshire County, Massachusetts
- East Nottingham Friends Meetinghouse or Brick Meetinghouse, Rising Sun, Cecil County, Maryland
- Easton Friends North Meetinghouse, Middle Falls in Washington County, New York
- Evesham Friends Meeting House, Mount Laurel Township, Burlington County, New Jersey
- Frankford Friends Meeting House, Frankford neighborhood, Philadelphia, Pennsylvania
- Frankford Monthly Meeting, Frankford neighborhood, Philadelphia, Pennsylvania
- Free Quaker Meetinghouse, Independence National Historical Park, Philadelphia, Pennsylvania
- Friends Meetinghouse (Uxbridge, Massachusetts)
- Friends Meetinghouse, Wilmington, Delaware
- Friends Meeting House and Cemetery, Little Compton, Rhode Island
- Great Friends Meeting House, Newport, Rhode Island
- Green Plain Monthly Meetinghouse, near South Charleston, Clark County, Ohio
- Greenfield Preparative Meeting House (Catskill Meeting House), Grahamsville, Sullivan County, New York
- Haverford Friends Meeting, Haverford, Pennsylvania
- Hockessin Friends Meetinghouse, Hockessin, New Castle County, Delaware
- Honey Creek Friends' Meetinghouse, New Providence, Iowa
- Hopewell Meeting House, Clear Brook, near Winchester, Virginia
- Horsham Friends Meeting, Horsham, Pennsylvania
- Jericho Friends Meeting House Complex, Jericho, Nassau County, New York
- Little Egg Harbor Friends Meeting House, Tuckerton, New Jersey
- Little Falls Meetinghouse, Fallston, Harford County, Maryland
- Live Oak Friends Meeting House, Houston, Texas
- Meeting House of the Friends Meeting of Washington, Washington, DC
- Merion Friends Meeting House, Merion Station, Lower Merion Township, Montgomery County, Pennsylvania
- Mill Creek Friends Meetinghouse, Newark, New Castle County, Delaware
- Nine Partners Meeting House and Cemetery, Millbrook, New York
- Oblong Friends Meeting House, in the hamlet of Quaker Hill, in the town of Pawling, Dutchess County, New York
- Old Kennett Meetinghouse, Kennett Township near Chadds Ford, Pennsylvania
- Old Town Friends' Meetinghouse also known as Aisquith Street Meeting, Baltimore Meeting or Patapsco, Baltimore, Maryland
- Pembroke Friends Meetinghouse, Pembroke, Plymouth County, Massachusetts
- Portsmouth Friends Meetinghouse Parsonage and Cemetery
- Poughkeepsie Meeting House (Hooker Avenue), Poughkeepsie, New York
- Poughkeepsie Meeting House (Montgomery Street), Poughkeepsie, New York
- Race Street Friends Meetinghouse, Philadelphia, Pennsylvania
- Sandy Spring Friends Meetinghouse, Sandy Spring, Montgomery County, Maryland
- Schuylkill Friends Meeting House, Phoenixville, Pennsylvania
- Seaville Friends Meeting House, Seaville community, Upper Township, New Jersey, Cape May County, New Jersey, this 1716–1727 meeting house is the smallest frame Quaker meeting house in the United States.
- Smith Clove Meetinghouse, Highland Mills, NY
- Smithfield Friends Meeting House, Parsonage & Cemetery
- South River Friends Meetinghouse, Lynchburg, Virginia
- South Starksboro Friends Meeting House and Cemetery, Starksboro, Vermont
- Stony Brook Meeting House and Cemetery, Princeton, Mercer County, New Jersey
- Third Haven Meeting House, Easton, Talbot County, Maryland
- Upper Dublin Friends Meeting House
- West Grove Friends Spring Meeting House, Alamance County, NC
- Virginia Beach Friends Meeting, Virginia Beach, Virginia https://www.vbfriends.org/
- Whittier First Friends Church, Whittier, California
- Yardley Friends Meeting House, Yardley, Pennsylvania
- York Meetinghouse, York, York County, Pennsylvania

=== United Kingdom ===
See also the list of Friends Meeting Houses in England

- Friends House, Euston, London
- Blackheath Quaker Meeting House in south-east London, England
- Brigflatts Meeting House, near Sedbergh, Cumbria, England
- Brighton Friends Meeting House, Brighton, East Sussex, England
- Coanwood Friends Meeting House, in an isolated, unpopulated valley south of Hadrian's Wall, about 2 miles (3 km) east of the village of Coanwood, and about 5 miles (8 km) south of the town of Haltwhistle in Northumberland, England
- Come-to-Good Friends Meeting House, Kea, near Truro, Cornwall, UK. It was also known as 'Kea Meeting House' and 'Feock Meeting House'.
- Quaker Meetinghouse, Woodhouse, Sheffield, England
- Godalming Friends Meeting House, Godalming, Surrey, England
- Howgills, Letchworth Garden City, Hertfordshire, England
- Ifield Friends Meeting House, Ifield neighbourhood of Crawley, West Sussex, England
- Jordans Meeting House, Buckinghamshire, England
- Leicester Friends Meeting House
- Littlehampton Friends Meeting House, Littlehampton, West Sussex, England
- Osmotherley Friends Meeting House, North Yorkshire, England
