= List of cemeteries in Vermont =

This list of cemeteries in Vermont includes currently operating, historical (closed for new interments), and defunct (graves abandoned or removed) cemeteries, columbaria, and mausolea which are historical and/or notable. It does not include pet cemeteries.

== Addison County ==
- South Starksboro Friends Meeting House and Cemetery in Starksboro; NRHP-listed

== Bennington County ==
- Dellwood Cemetery in Manchester Village

== Chittenden County ==
- Lakeview Cemetery in Burlington

== Franklin County ==
- Greenwood Cemetery in St. Albans

== Rutland County ==
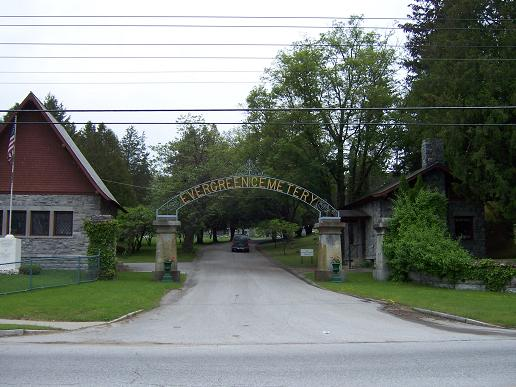
Evergreen Cemetery in Rutland, Rutland County

- Evergreen Cemetery in Rutland

== Washington County ==
- Green Mount Cemetery in Montpelier
- Hope Cemetery in Barre

== Windham County ==
- Lowell Lake Cemetery in Londonderry
- Oak Hill Cemetery Chapel in Bellows Falls; NRHP-listed
- Prospect Hill Cemetery in Brattleboro

== Windsor County ==
- Old Christ Church in Bethel; NRHP-listed
- Plymouth Notch Cemetery in Plymouth Notch

== See also ==
- List of cemeteries in the United States
