= Old Christ Church =

Old Christ Church can refer to:

- Old Christ Church (Bethel, Vermont)
- Old Christ Church (Laurel, Delaware)
- Old Christ Church (Pensacola, Florida)
