= Hopewell Friends Meeting House (Frederick County, Virginia) =

Historic church in Virginia, United States

- U.S. National Register of Historic Places
- Virginia Landmarks Register
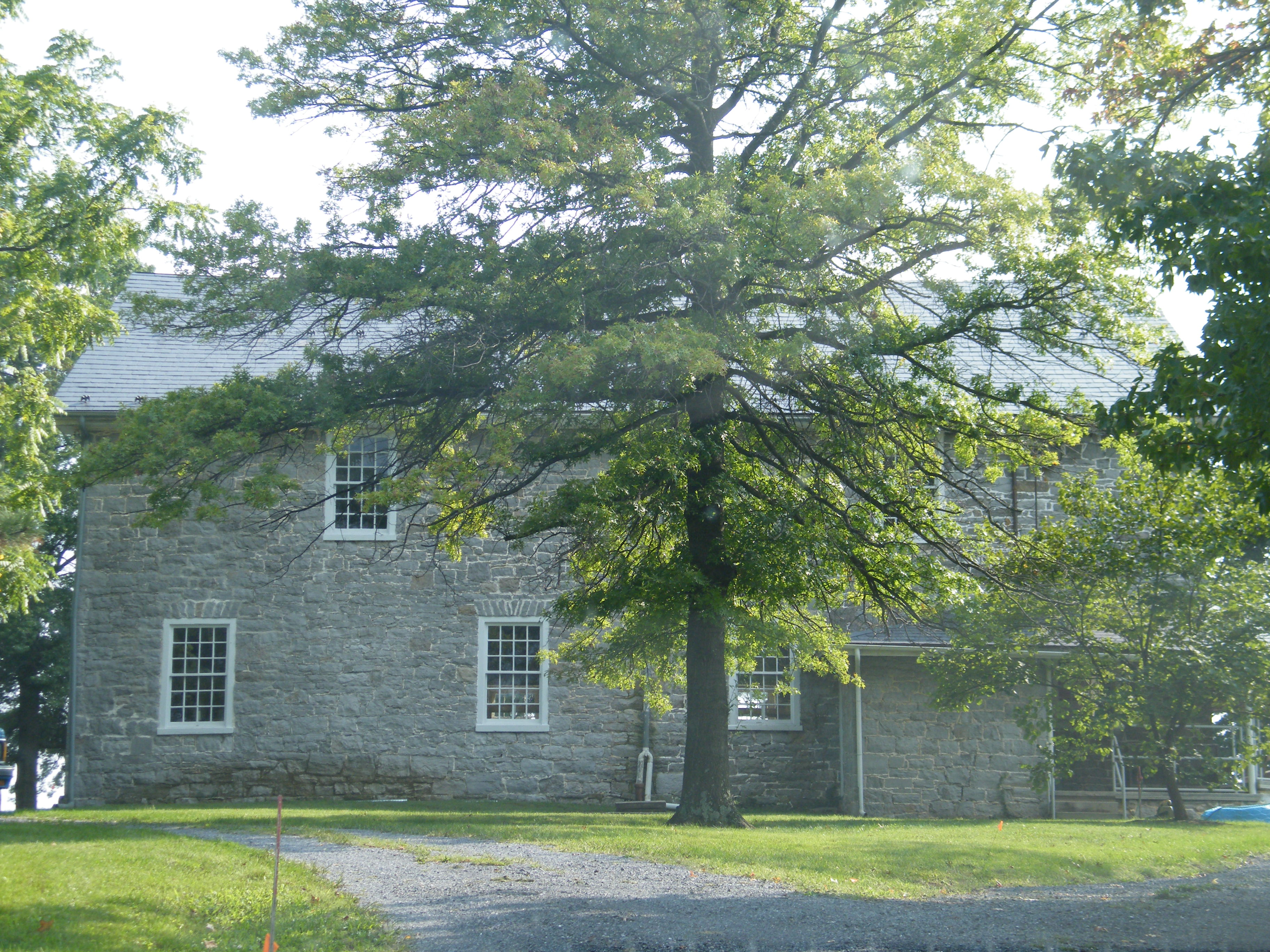
- Hopewell Friends Meeting House, September 2011

- Location within Virginia Location within the United States
- Nearest city: Clear Brook
- Coordinates: 39.256389°N 78.115278°W
- Area: 8 acres (3.2 ha)
- Built: 1759–1761 (original); 1788–1794 (expansion)
- Built by: Thomas McClun
- NRHP reference No.: 80004190
- VLR No.: 034-0006

Significant dates
- Added to NRHP: March 28, 1980
- Designated VLR: November 15, 1977

Hopewell Friends Meeting House is an 18th-century Quaker meeting house located the northern Frederick County, Virginia one mile west of the community of Clear Brook at 604 Hopewell Road (formerly State Route 672). Clear Brook, VA 22624. This community was the home of Thomas William "Tom" Fox (1951–2006), a Quaker peace activist, affiliated with Christian Peacemaker Teams (CPT) murdered in 2006 in Iraq.

== History ==
=== Early history ===
Hopewell Friends Meeting was named "Opeckan", after nearby Opequon Creek, when it was set off from the Concord (Pennsylvania) Quarterly Meeting in 1734. It is the oldest Quaker meeting in Virginia's Shenandoah Valley. Some of the original group of settlers came from the Monocacy valley in Frederick County, Maryland, but most came from Chester County, Pennsylvania. "Alexander Ross hath proposed to this meeting on behalf of (f)friends (a)at Opeckon that a meeting for worship may be settled among'st them which is under y'e consideration & care of this meeting until(l) a suitable time to give them a visit." This excerpt was taken from the Nottingham Monthly Meeting Minutes from the meeting of May 18, 1734. Initially, this meeting was a member of the Philadelphia Yearly Meeting. At that time, the settlement included about seventy families. Initially, a log meeting house was built on lands originally granted by Lt. Gov. William Gooch of Virginia to two Ulster Scots with roots in Northern Ireland, a Quaker named Alexander Ross (in 1730) and Morgan Bryan (a 1732 grant to this Presbyterian). Prominent London Quaker John Fothergill (1712-1780) visited this meeting in 1736. In 1757, the 1734 meeting house burned. In addition to losing its place of worship, the congregation also almost lost all its early records in a 1759 house fire.

=== Current Meeting House Built ===
Thomas McClun acted as builder for the original 33 feet x 44 feet coursed rubble limestone structure. Located at "the gate of the Shenandoah Valley", this meeting prospered and increased. From 1789 until 1794, the western 30 x 30 addition nearly doubled the size of Hopewell Meeting House. The National Register Nomination Form described the interior thus:

The interior of the meeting house consists of a large open space with a tiered gallery on the south and west walls. The balcony retains early benches with scrolled ends. Enclosed stairs, side by side, ascend from the center of the south wall. Large posts, some squared, some turned, support the gallery at various points. The main floor has early benches with open backs and some later, standard church-type benches. A platform with additional benches is against the north wall facing the congregation area. As might be expected the effect of the interior is exceedingly plain; the walls and ceiling are plastered and the openings are devoid of ornamental trim.

=== The Great Separation and After ===
Following the Great Separation of 1827, local Hicksite Quakers use one half of the meeting house and their Orthodox brethren the other. Both were buried in the nearby meeting house cemetery. In 1870, W. D. Lee built a limestone wall around the cemetery. Both sides contributed to repairing the structure in 1910 and this led to a healing of the schism. It is thought that the current roof lines date from this renovation.

=== Subsequent History ===
In 1934, Hopewell celebrated its bicentennial and in 1936 Hopewell Friends History, 1734-1934, Frederick County, Virginia: Records of Hopewell Monthly Meetings and Meetings Reporting to Hopewell; Two Hundred Years of History and Genealogy compiled from official records and published by a Joint Committee of Hopewell Friends, assisted by John W. Wayland was published. (It was reprinted in 1975 by Baltimore's Genealogical Publishing Company.) Hopewell Meeting House was listed on the National Register of Historic Places on May 3, 1980. In 1999, Hopewell and Winchester's Centre meeting united to form the Hopewell Centre Monthly Meeting. It is a member of the Baltimore Yearly Meeting. In 2011, the Hopewell Centre Monthly Meeting reported 71 full members, 16 associate members, and 17 attenders for a total of 104 members, a decrease of five from the previous year's report.
