= Horsham Friends Meeting =

Historic church in Pennsylvania, United States

- U.S. National Register of Historic Places
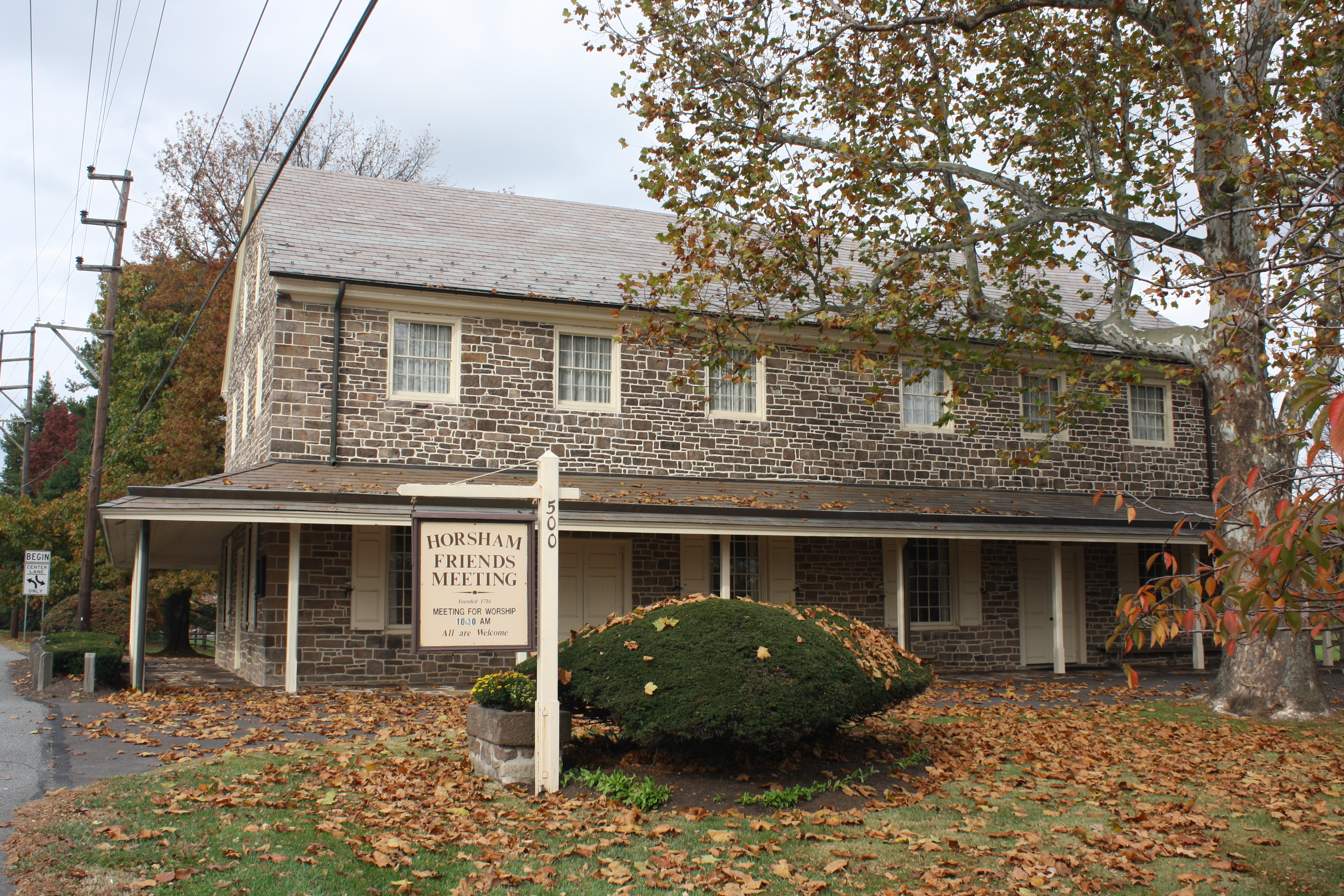
- Horsham Friends Meeting. October 2012.

- Location within Pennsylvania Location within the United States
- Location: Horsham, Pennsylvania
- Coordinates: 40°11′0″N 75°7′57″W
- Built: 1803
- Architectural style: Georgian
- NRHP reference No.: 91000723
- Added to NRHP: June 21, 1991

The Horsham Friends Meeting is an historic Quaker meeting house which is located in Horsham, Pennsylvania, United States. Home to the Horsham Monthly Meeting, it has been listed on the National Register of Historic Places since June 21, 1991.

In addition to serving as a place of worship, is also a place of education. The Quaker School at Horsham is located on the meeting's grounds. A carriage house is located next to the meeting and an attached graveyard is situated across Easton Road, the street on which the Meeting sits.

== History and architectural features ==
Made of squared and cut pink sandstone, this historic structure is an example of a style of meeting houses known as "double meeting houses," so named due to their separate entrances for men and women. A central partition can be closed to divide the interior into men's and women's sections. An interior balcony encircles the entire meeting room.

Horsham Friends Meeting was founded in 1716. Land in the area was originally deeded from William Penn to Samuel Carpenter. Hannah Carpenter deeded the surrounding fifty acres to the meeting in 1718. The current meeting house, which was built in 1803, is situated the third on the site.

=== Present day ===
Horsham Meeting is an active Quaker community, and is a member of Abington Quarterly Meeting, of Philadelphia Yearly Meeting.

== Gallery ==
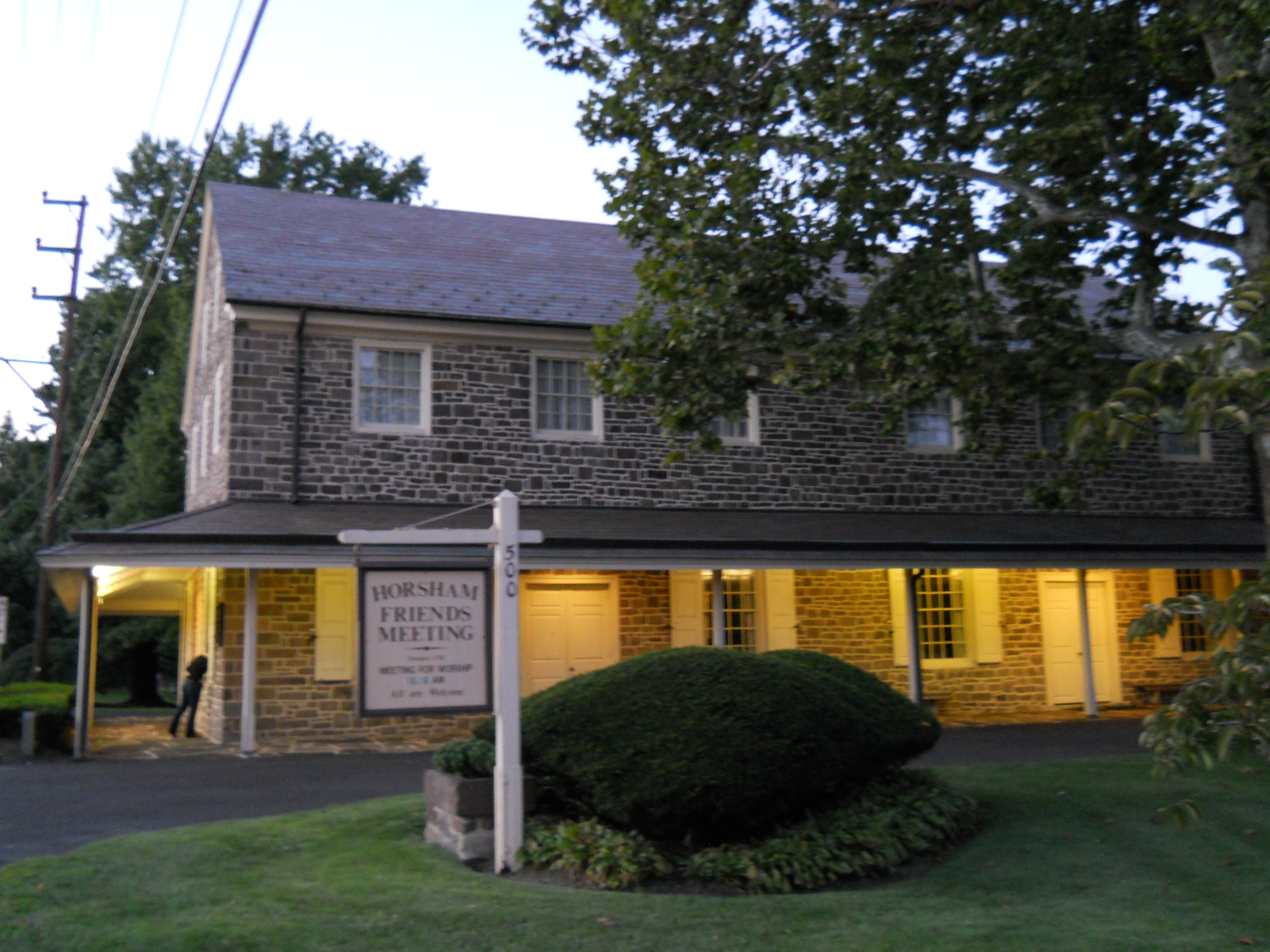
Horsham Friends Meeting by night

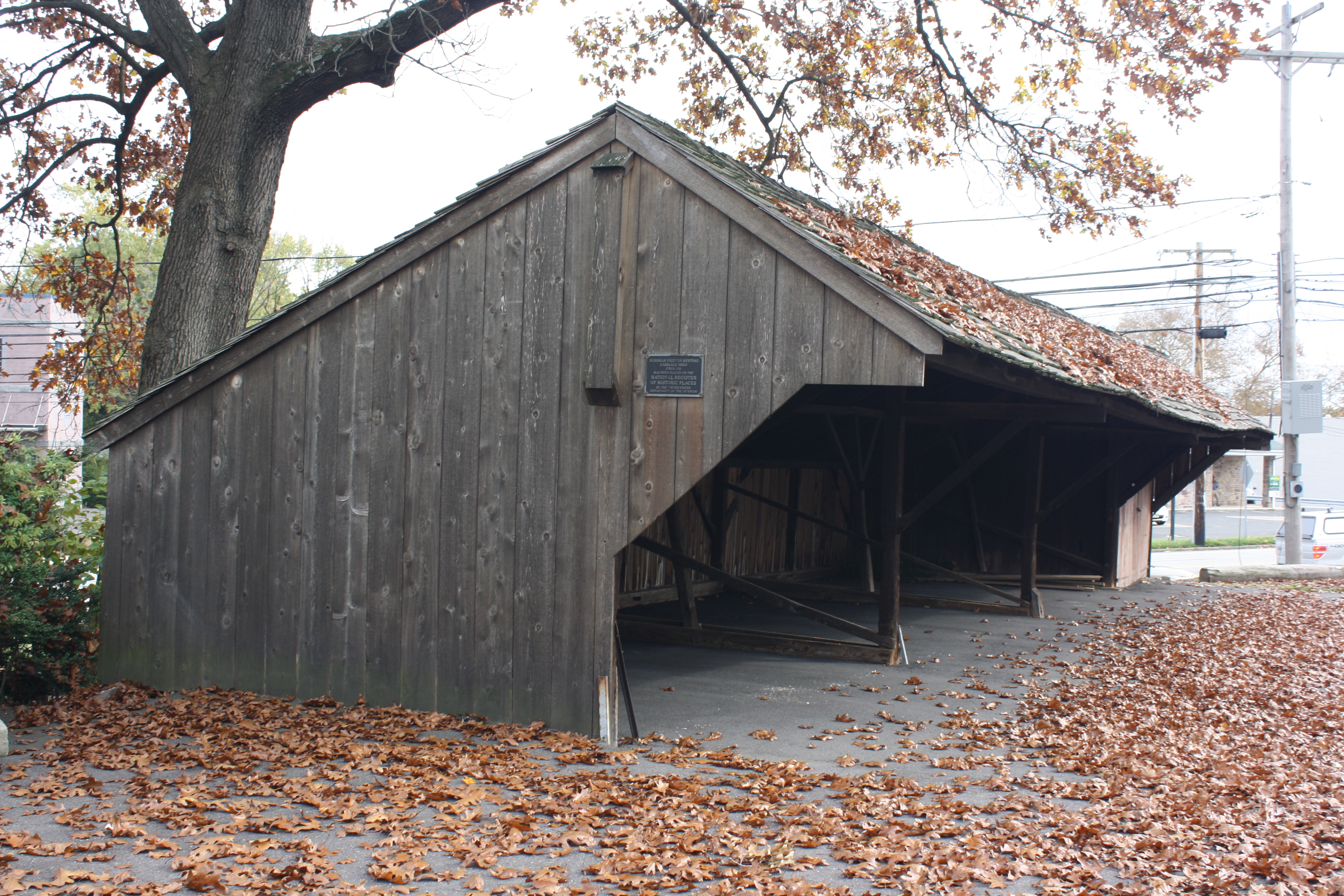
Carriage Shed
