= Colora Meetinghouse =

Historic church in Maryland, United States

- U.S. National Register of Historic Places
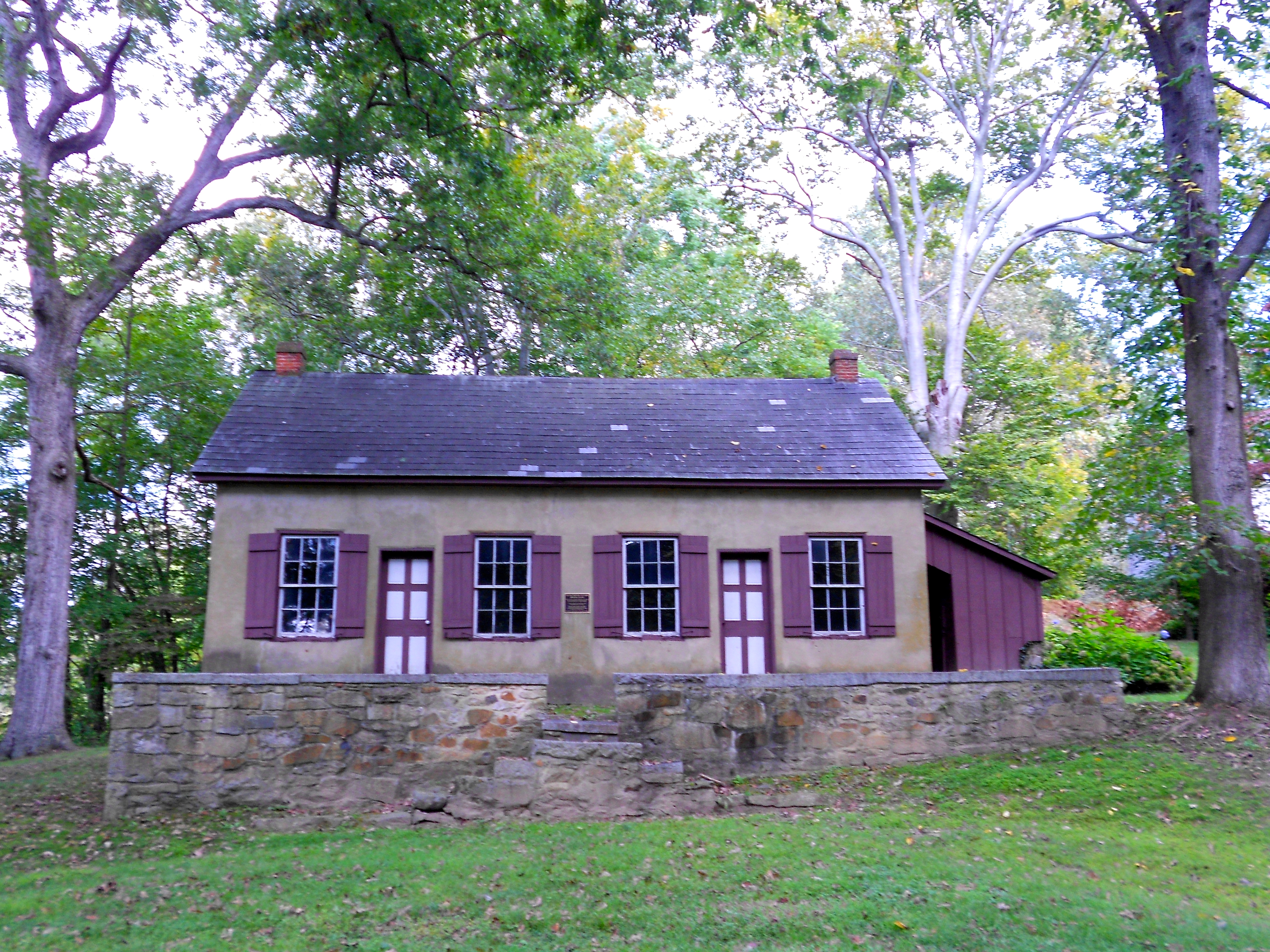
- Front view showing the separate men's and women's entrances

- Location within Maryland Location within the United States
- Location: Corncake Row, Colora, Maryland
- Coordinates: 39°40′32″N 76°5′56″W
- Area: 1.5 acres (0.61 ha)
- Built: 1841
- NRHP reference No.: 77000689
- Added to NRHP: August 22, 1977

The Colora Meetinghouse is a historic Friends (or Quaker) meeting house located at Colora, Cecil County, Maryland, United States.

The meeting house was built in 1841 as part of a larger dispute known as the "great separation." The original members of the Colora Meeting, then called the Nottingham Preparative Meeting, sided with the orthodox Friends splitting off from the Hicksite West Nottingham Friends Meeting. The new meeting was first part of Baltimore Yearly Meeting. In 1854 it formed the Primitive Yearly Meeting with several nearby meetings and in 1890 became part of the Western Quarterly Meeting.

== Architecture ==
It is six bays wide and one room deep, and measures 36 feet by 22 feet, in the traditional plan with separate entrances for the men and women and a sliding divider to separate the interior into two areas for business meetings. Its walls are constructed of 18-inch-thick (460 mm) stuccoed fieldstone, with a wooden box cornice. The building features two interior end chimneys protruding through a slate roof. The property includes a small cemetery and a two-story building built in 1869, and used as a Friends schoolhouse until 1890 when public schools were built.

The Colora Meetinghouse was listed on the National Register of Historic Places in 1977. It is open for worship once yearly, generally at 2:00 pm on the third Sunday of September.

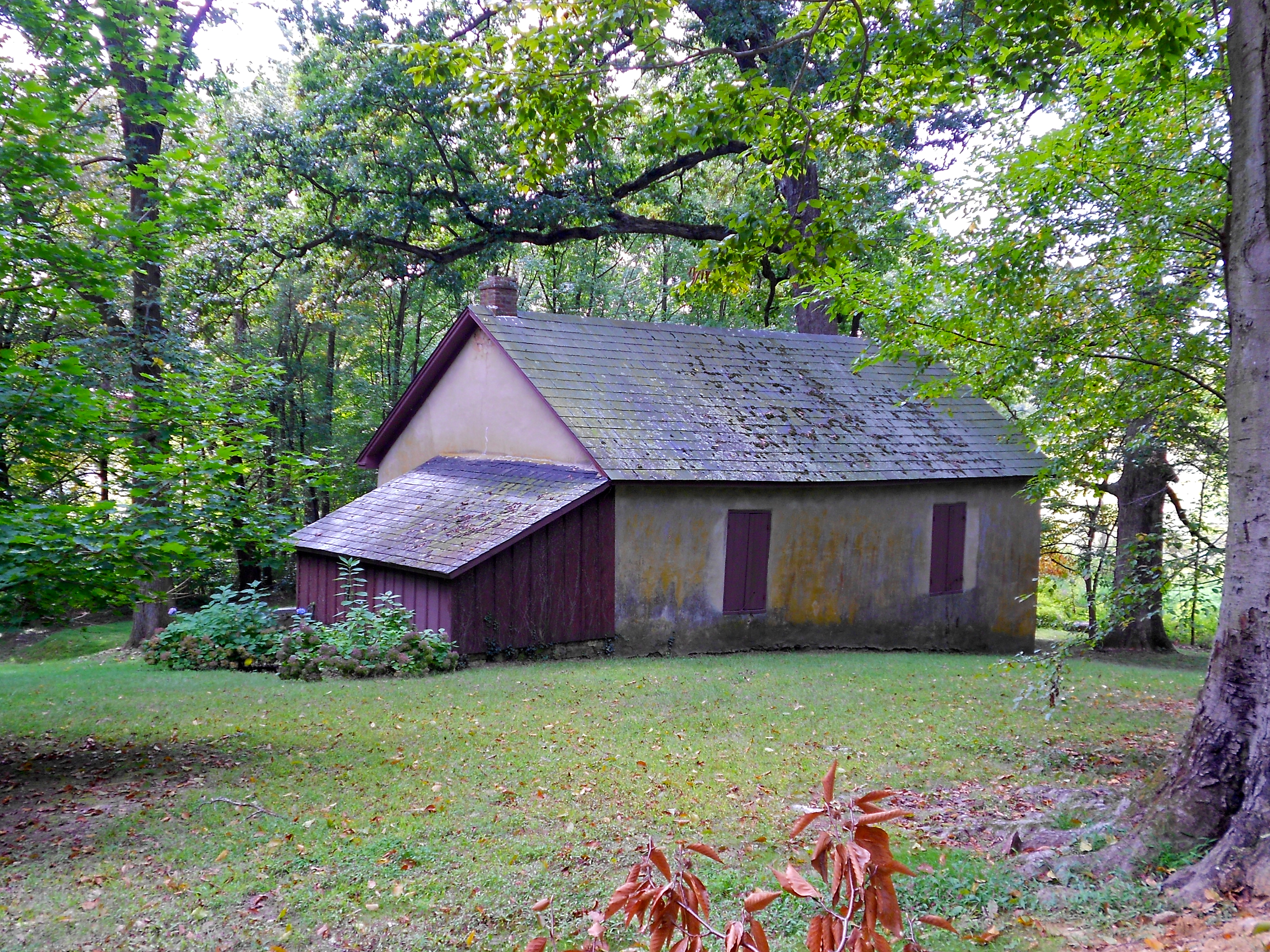
Back of the meeting house

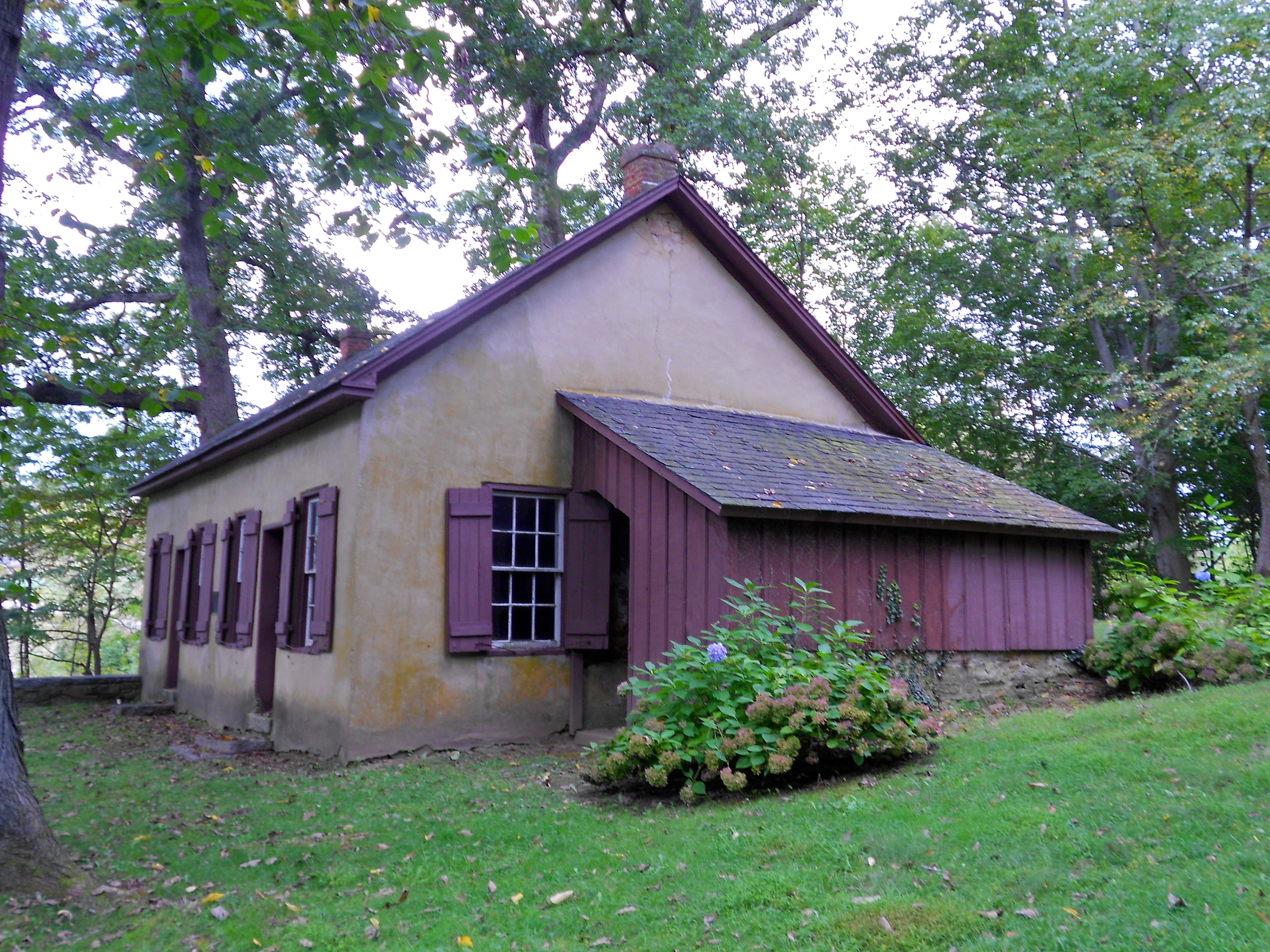
Oblique view

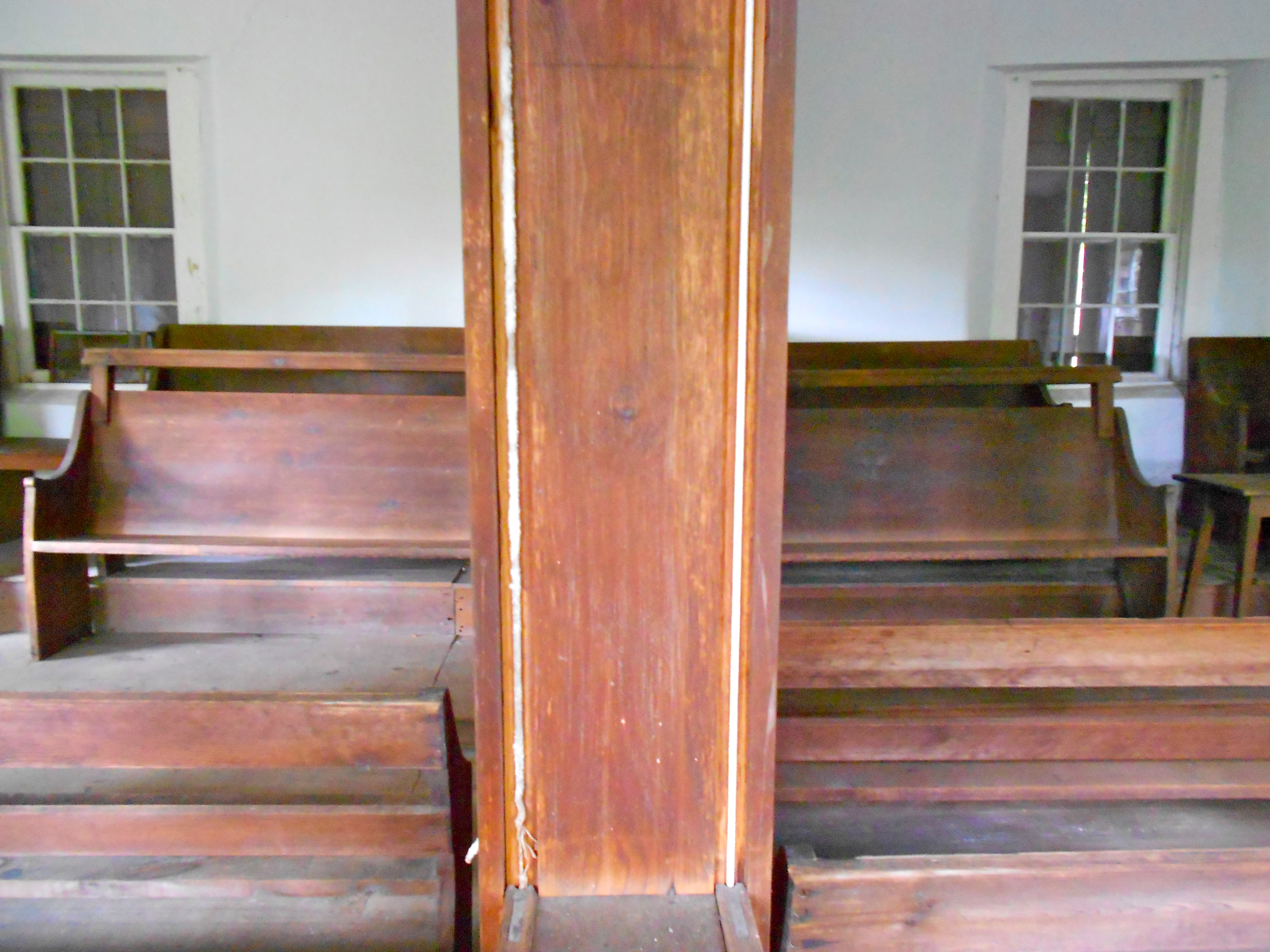
Interior showing the "facing benches" for the elders and the moving divider sometimes used to separate the men's and women's meetings
