= Poughkeepsie Meeting House (Hooker Avenue) =

Historic meetinghouse in New York, United States

- U.S. National Register of Historic Places
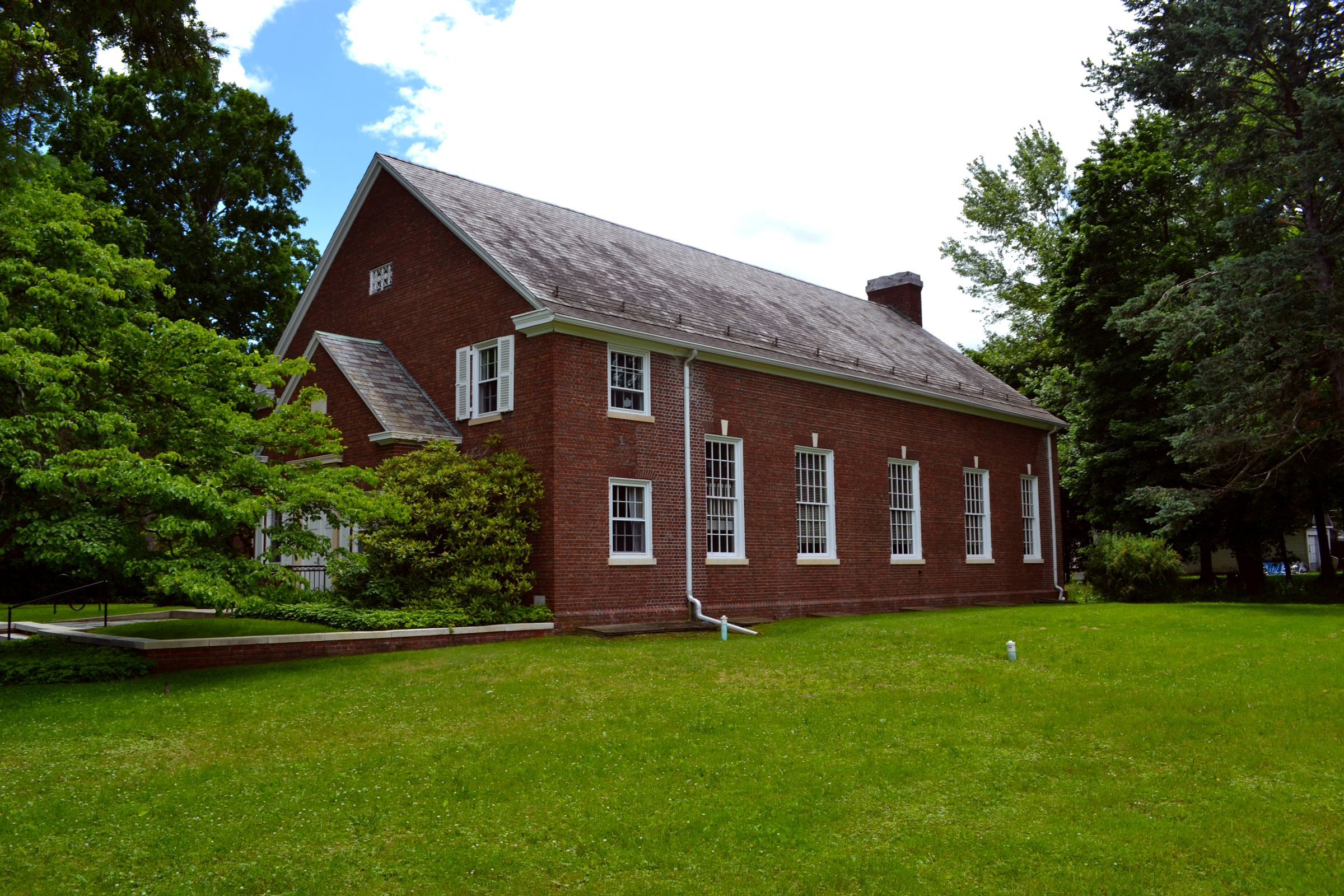
- The meeting house in June 2013.

- Location within New York Location within the United States
- Location: 249 Hooker Ave., Poughkeepsie, New York
- Coordinates: 41°41′10″N 73°54′42″W
- Area: 5 acres (2.0 ha)
- Built: 1927
- Architect: Bussell, Alfred
- Architectural style: Colonial Revival
- MPS: Dutchess County Quaker Meeting Houses TR
- NRHP reference No.: 89000306
- Added to NRHP: April 27, 1989

Poughkeepsie Meeting House (Hooker Avenue) is a historic Quaker (Society of Friends) meeting house at 249 Hooker Avenue in Poughkeepsie, New York. It was built in 1927, and is a two-story, rectangular, Colonial Revival style brick building, with a basement. It has a gable roof and projecting entrance pavilion.

It was listed on the National Register of Historic Places in 1989.

== Design ==
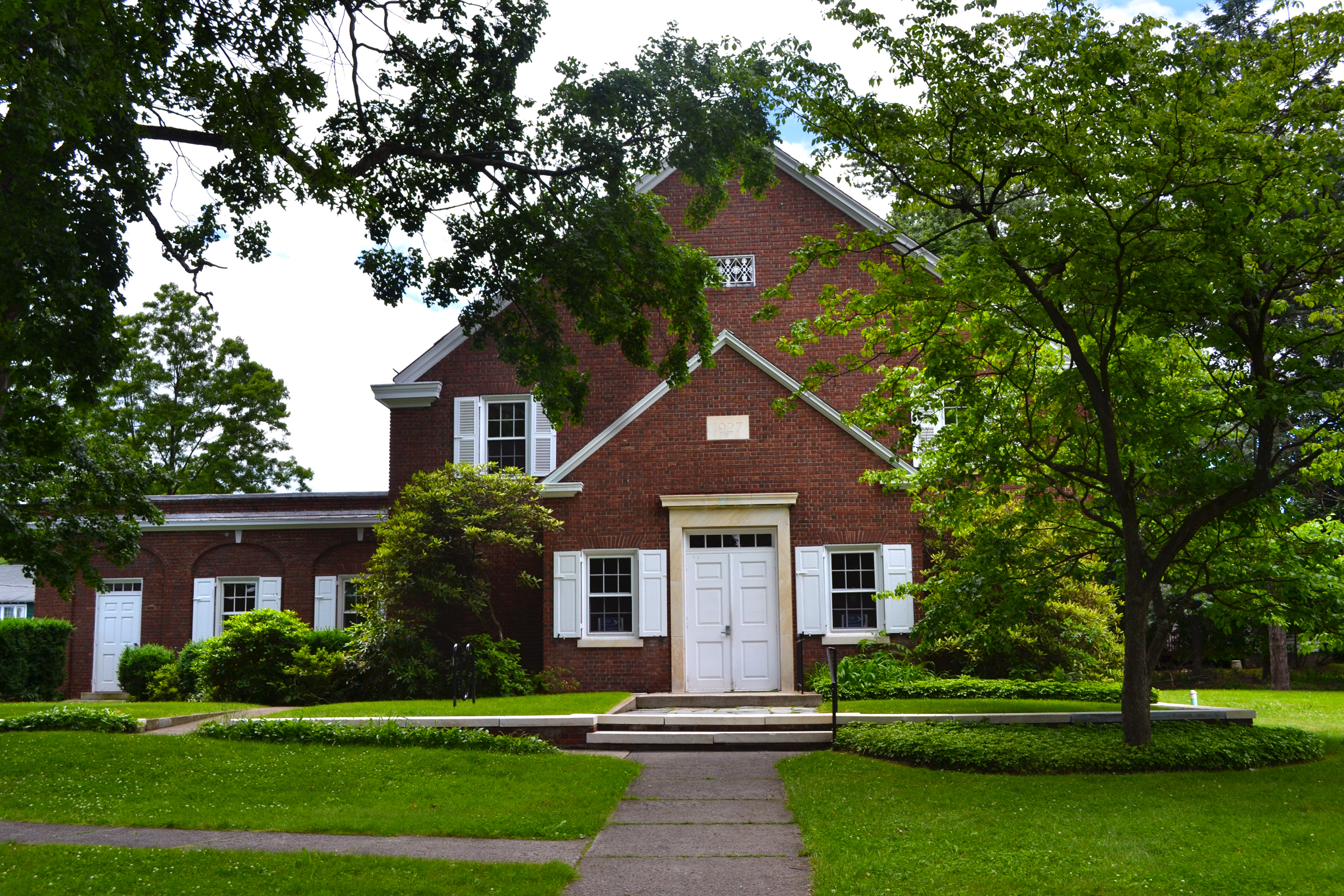
The Eastern Elevation (Front Door)

The design of the meeting house is unusual, having swayed away from the designs of traditional Quaker meeting houses. It was a result of the reunification of the two groups of Quakers that had initially separated from a schism in 1827, where two thirds of Quakers abandoned the philosophies of their founder, George Fox, and instead turned to the ideals taught by Long Island preacher, Elias Hicks. By 1926, when it was time to construct a new meeting house in Poughkeepsie, the number of local “Hicksite” Quakers was diminishing, so many had joined the Orthodox Quakers. Alfred Bussel, a New York City architect, was chosen to design a meeting house that appealed to all members. Since he had studied at Haverford College, a Quaker school, Bussell was very familiar with the Society of Friends traditions. One branch had suggested a church-like structure with steeple, organ, and stained-glass windows, while the other wanted a more traditional style meeting house, i.e. evoking simplicity, equality, community, and peace. The design therefore was a unity between the two branches, a sign of what was to come with the official reunification in the 1950s. The result is a simple, colonial revival building without stained-glass or any sort of liturgical ornamentation or symbols, as per Quaker tradition, but had a single front door (Quaker meeting houses had separate entrances for men and women) and an interior layout akin to a church; a central aisle with rows of pews on either side all facing the front of the building.
