= Clear Brook, Virginia =

Unincorporated community in Virginia, United States

- Unincorporated community
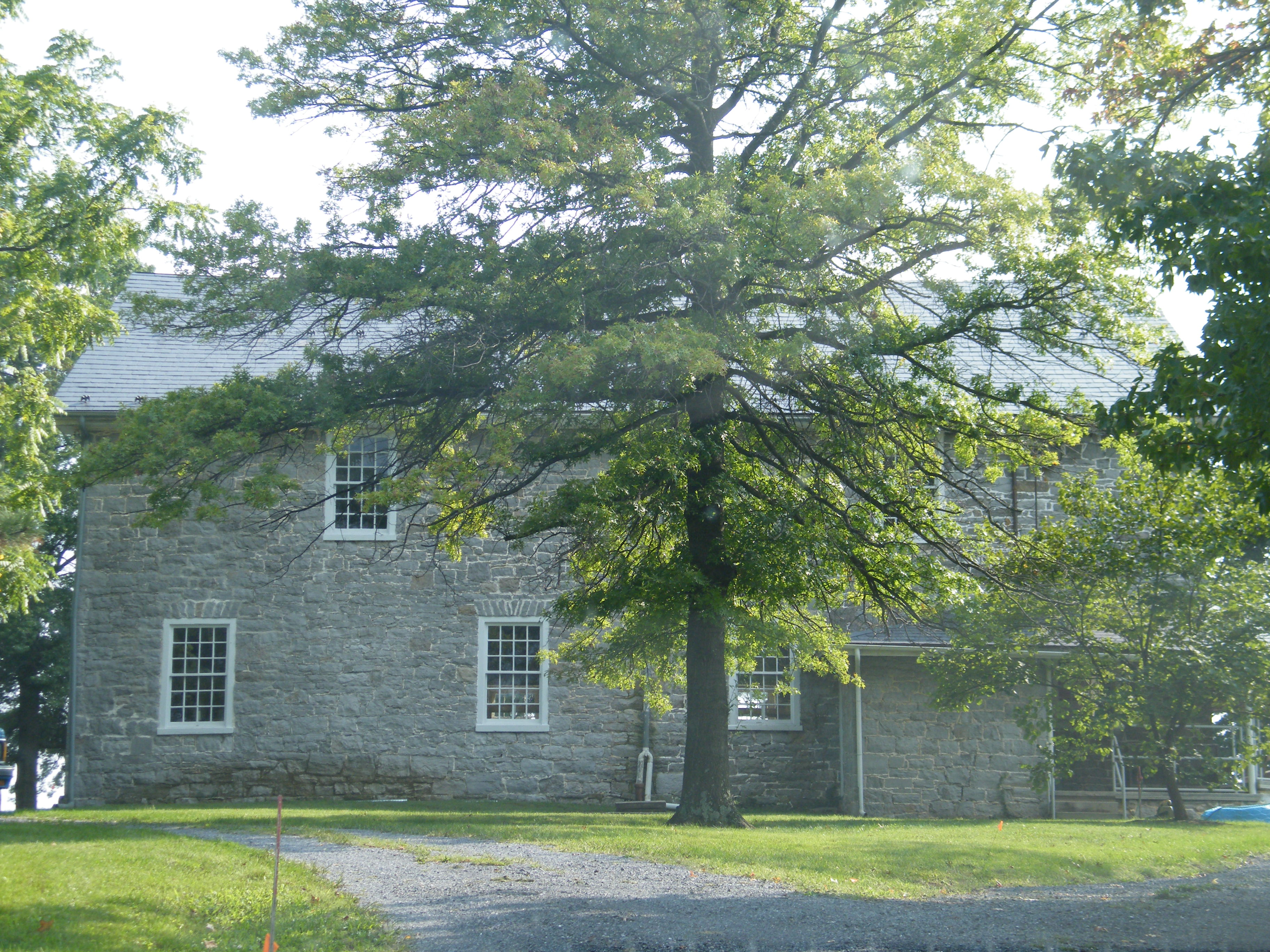
- Hopewell Friends Meetinghouse

- Location within Virginia Location within the United States
- Coordinates: 39°15′23″N 78°5′46″W
- Country: United States
- State: Virginia
- County: Frederick
- Time zone: UTC−5 (Eastern (EST))
  - Summer (DST): UTC−4 (EDT)
- ZIP codes: 22624
- Area code: 540
- GNIS feature ID: 1495396

Clear Brook is an unincorporated farming community in northern Frederick County, Virginia, United States. The community lies approximately six miles (9.6 kilometers) north of the county seat of Winchester along Martinsburg Pike (U.S. Route 11). It is the site of the Kenilworth home, once owned by Harry K. Thaw, the old Hopewell Meeting House, Stonewall Elementary School, the Clearbrook Park, and the Frederick County Fairgrounds.

Sometimes referred to as Clearbrook, its name was decided upon by the Board on Geographic Names in 1966 as Clear Brook.

Clear Brook drew national attention when resident and Quaker peace activist Tom Fox was kidnapped in Baghdad on November 25, 2005. Fox's body was found March 9, 2006.

== Culture ==
Clear Brook was selected as the site for the Hogging Up BBQ & Music Festival, a Kansas City Barbeque Society sanctioned event deemed a "State Championship" by the Governor of Virginia for 2013. The event is an annual event supporting local charities under the guidance of Wayne Schafer, a barbecue pitmaster who runs the event.

Clear Brook is well known throughout Northern Virginia as well as the Route 11 and Highway 81 corridors for its annual holiday light display in Clear Brook Park. The light display typically opens the day after Thanksgiving and runs through early January. The display is turned off at 10pm each night and is also closed on Christmas Eve, Christmas Day, and New Year's Eve.
