= Green Plain Monthly Meetinghouse =

Historic church in Ohio, United States

- U.S. National Register of Historic Places
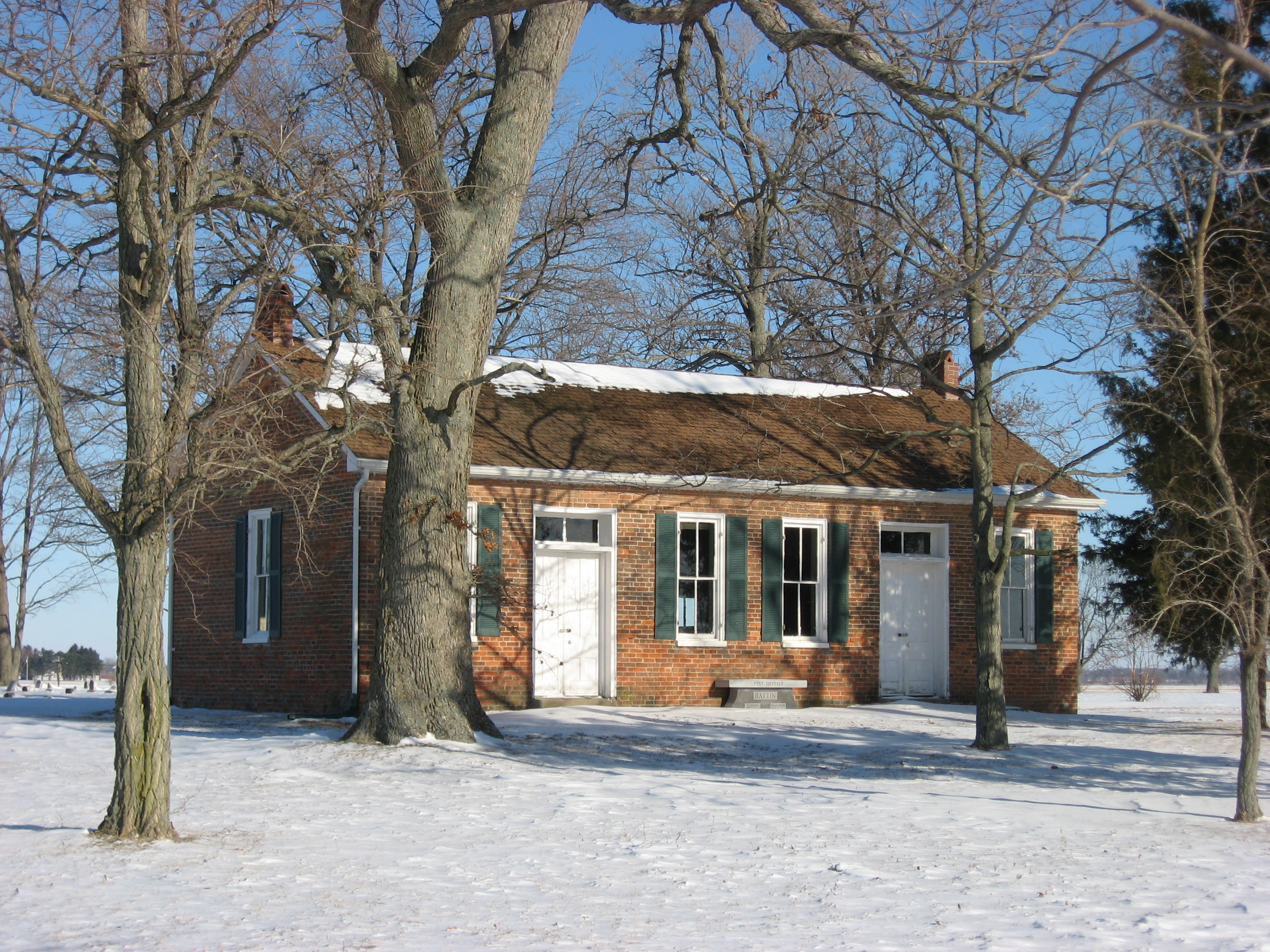
- Front and western side

- Location within Ohio Location within the United States
- Location: South Charleston-Clifton Rd., southwest of South Charleston
- Nearest city: South Charleston, Ohio
- Coordinates: 39°48′35″N 83°41′28″W
- Area: 1 acre (0.40 ha)
- Built: 1843
- Architectural style: Greek Revival
- NRHP reference No.: 82003551
- Added to NRHP: April 1, 1982

The Green Plain Monthly Meetinghouse is a historic former Quaker house of worship near South Charleston in Clark County, Ohio, United States. Built in 1843, it was used by a part of a monthly meeting that was established in the area in 1822. The original Green Plain Monthly Meeting lasted for only a short while, splitting into Orthodox and Hicksite branches just four years after it was founded: the Orthodox members settled in the community of Selma, while the Hicksites kept the original property. In turn, the Hicksites split in 1843 over the issue of slavery; the liberal party kept the original church, while the conservatives moved to South Charleston-Clifton Road and built the present building.

Built of brick, the Green Plain Monthly Meetinghouse is a Greek Revival building; in line with the simple habits of its builders, the meetinghouse features few adornments. It has been virtually unchanged since its construction, still retaining original elements such as the structural separation between the men's side and the women's side of the interior.

In 1982, the meetinghouse was listed on the National Register of Historic Places. It qualified because of its historically significant architecture: few so well-preserved and little-changed Quaker meetinghouses remain in this region of Ohio, so it permits a nearly unparalleled view of the lives of some early Ohioans. Included in the historic designation was the monthly meeting's cemetery, which has stones with death dates as far back as 1843.
