= York Meetinghouse =

Historic church in Pennsylvania, United States

- U.S. National Register of Historic Places
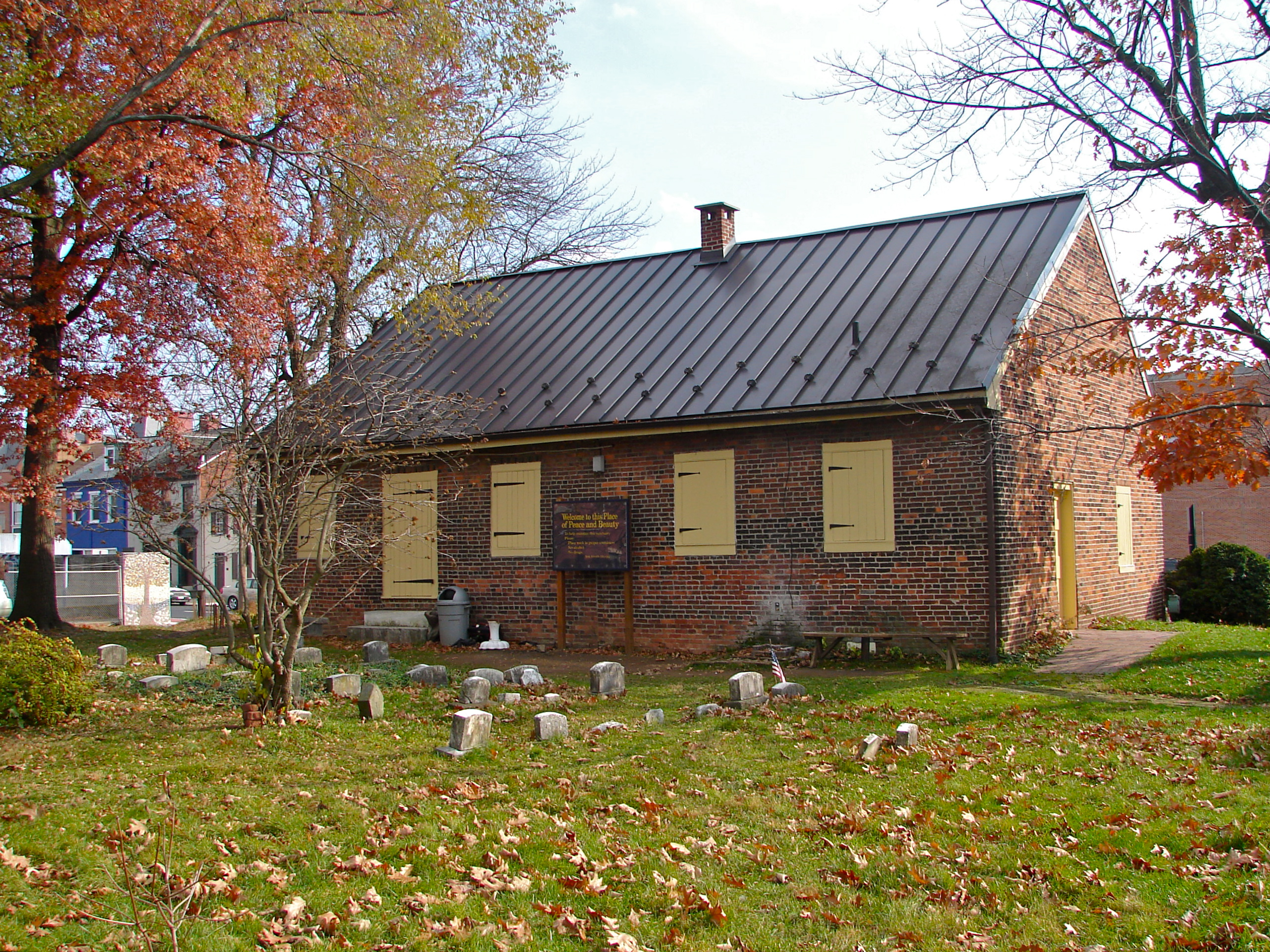
- York Meetinghouse, November 2010

- Location within Pennsylvania Location within the United States
- Location: 134 West Philadelphia St., York, Pennsylvania
- Coordinates: 39°57′42″N 76°44′10″W
- Area: 1 acre (0.40 ha)
- Built: 1766, 1783
- Built by: Willis, William
- NRHP reference No.: 75001683
- Added to NRHP: May 6, 1975

The York Meetinghouse is a historic, American Quaker meeting house that is located at 135 West Philadelphia Street in York, York County, Pennsylvania.

It was added to the National Register of Historic Places in 1975.

== History and architectural features ==
Built in 1766, this historic structure was expanded in 1783. The original building was a two-bay brick structure with a gable roof. The addition nearly doubled the size of the building. It is a two-bay brick structure with another entrance and window. The meeting house is still used for regular worship.
