= Creek Meeting House and Friends' Cemetery =

Historic church in New York, United States

- U.S. National Register of Historic Places
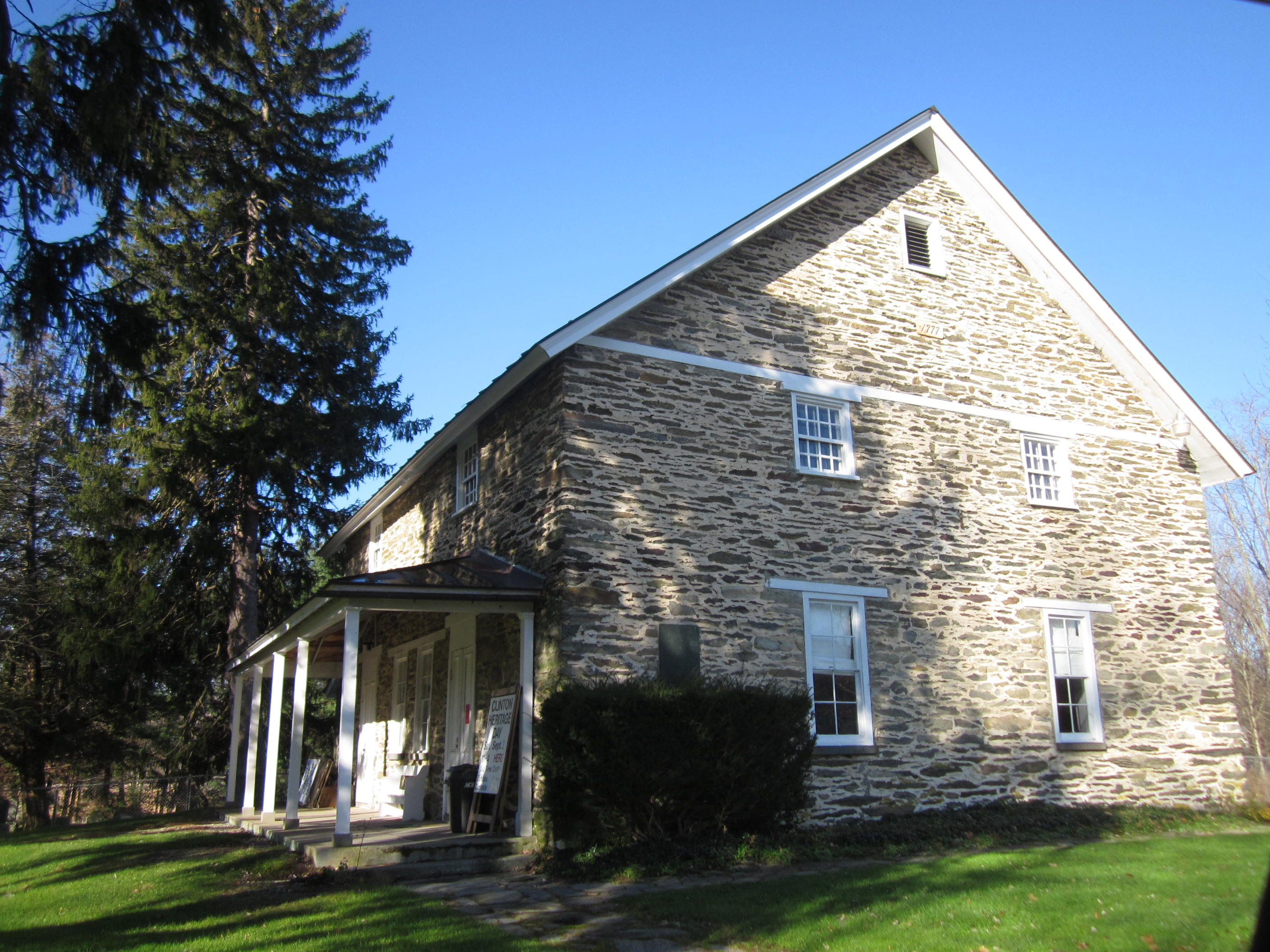
- Creek Meeting House, November 2011

- Location within New York Location within the United States
- Location: Salt Point Tnpk./Main St., Clinton Corners, New York
- Coordinates: 41°49′53″N 73°45′43″W
- Area: 4 acres (1.6 ha)
- Built: 1777
- MPS: Dutchess County Quaker Meeting Houses TR
- NRHP reference No.: 89000299
- Added to NRHP: April 27, 1989

Creek Meeting House and Friends' Cemetery is a historic Society of Friends meeting house and cemetery on Salt Point Turnpike/Main Street in Clinton Corners, Dutchess County, New York, United States. It was built between 1777 and 1782. The meeting house is a two-story, squarish building constructed of fieldstone. Land for the building was given by Able Peters, whose substantial brick house is the next building on the same side of the road north of the meeting house. In 1828 the Friends Creek Meeting split into Hicksite and Orthodox meetings. The Orthodox meeting moved about a mile north of Clinton Corners to the Shingle Meeting House located on the grounds of the current Friends Upton Lake Cemetery. The Creek Meeting sold the building to the Upton Lake Grange in 1927 and joined the Bulls Head Meeting in 1936.

The Grange transferred the building to the Town of Clinton Historical Society in 1995. The original slate covered, moderately pitched gable roof was replaced with metal in the early 21st century by the Historical Society.

The still active surrounding cemetery contains over 100 headstones of slate in a plain Quaker style along with many marble and newer granite. The early tradition of marking graves with wood has also left nearly 100 unmarked graves which are noted on the July 1938 survey of the cemetery. The Peters family plot in the northwestern portion of the burial grounds was moved to make room for the Poughkeepsie and Eastern Railroad and is distinguished by its low enclosure.

The Creek Meeting house was listed on the National Register of Historic Places in 1989 and is located directly across the street from the Clinton Corners Friends Church.
