= South Starksboro Friends Meeting House and Cemetery =

Historic site in Addison County, Vermont

- U.S. National Register of Historic Places
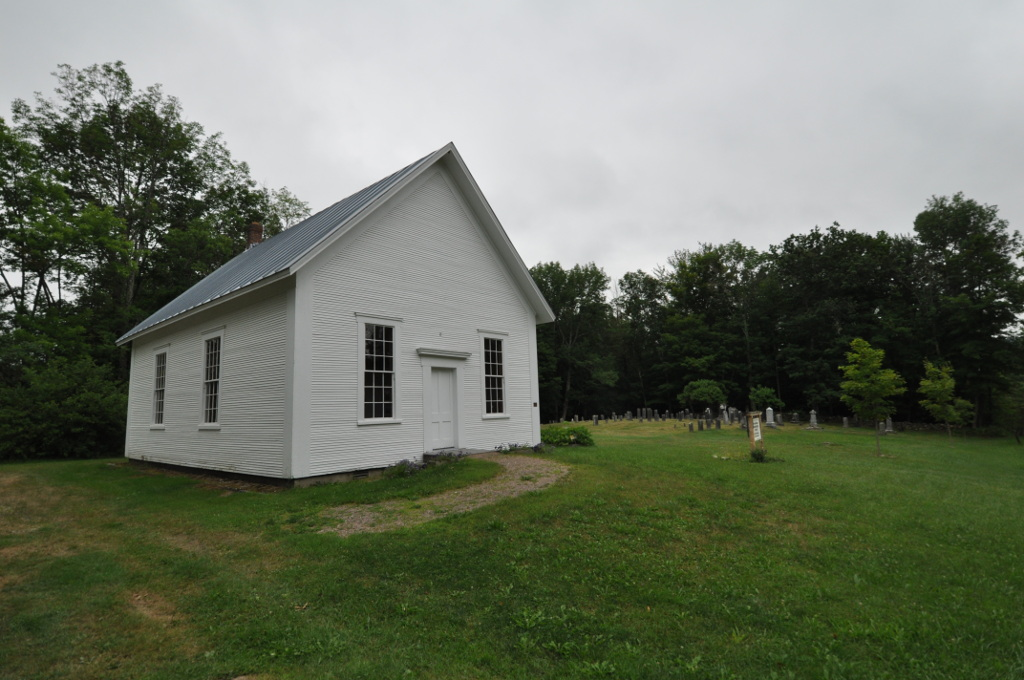

- Location within Vermont Location within the United States
- Location: Dan Sargent Rd., Starksboro, Vermont
- Coordinates: 44°10′2″N 73°0′53″W
- Area: 0.5 acres (0.20 ha)
- Built: 1828
- Architectural style: Quaker Meeting House
- NRHP reference No.: 85002769
- Added to NRHP: November 07, 1985

The South Starksboro Friends Meeting House and Cemetery is a historic Quaker meeting house and cemetery on Dan Sargent Road in Starksboro, Vermont. Built in 1828 and last significantly updated in the 1870s, it is the oldest Quaker meeting house in Vermont, and continues to see regular use. It was listed on the National Register of Historic Places in 1985.

== Description and history ==
The South Starksboro Friends Meeting House stands in a rural area of southern Starksboro, on the east side of Dan Sargent Road. It is a modest rectangular wood-frame structure, with a metal roof, clapboarded exterior, and modern concrete foundation. Its front facade has three bays, with sash windows flanking a minimally adorned entrance flanked by wide moulding and topped by a cornice. The side walls each have two windows, and the rear wall has a single window in the half story, providing the sole means of access to the attic. The interior has an entry vestibule across its width, which leads into the main hall, now typically arranged with pews in a circular configuration. The interior has original bead-board wainscoting, but most of its modest stylistic elements date to the late 19th century, including kerosene lamps for lighting and a small organ. Most of the 0.5-acre (0.20 ha) property is taken up by the cemetery, which has modest headstones and burials dating from the early 19th century to the 1970s.

The Starksboro area was one of earliest places in Vermont to be settled by Quakers, drawn by Joseph Hoag, who had established a meeting at Danby. The Starksboro Meeting was organized in 1799 as the Lincoln Preparative Meeting, a subordinate group to that at Danby. In 1825, it was renamed as the Creek Meeting, and the present building was constructed the following year. Prior to that, the meeting had met at the home of David Morrison, which still stands several hundred yards north on Dan Sargent Road. In 1871 the building was enlarged by the addition of the entrance hall, and stylistic changes were made to its interior. The congregation supported a minister until 1923, and the building is still the site of regular meetings, albeit on a less frequent basis than in the past. The only other 19th-century Quaker meeting house still in use in the state is in nearby Monkton.

== See also ==
- National Register of Historic Places listings in Addison County, Vermont
