= Poughkeepsie Meeting House (Montgomery Street) =

Historic meetinghouse in New York, United States

- U.S. National Register of Historic Places
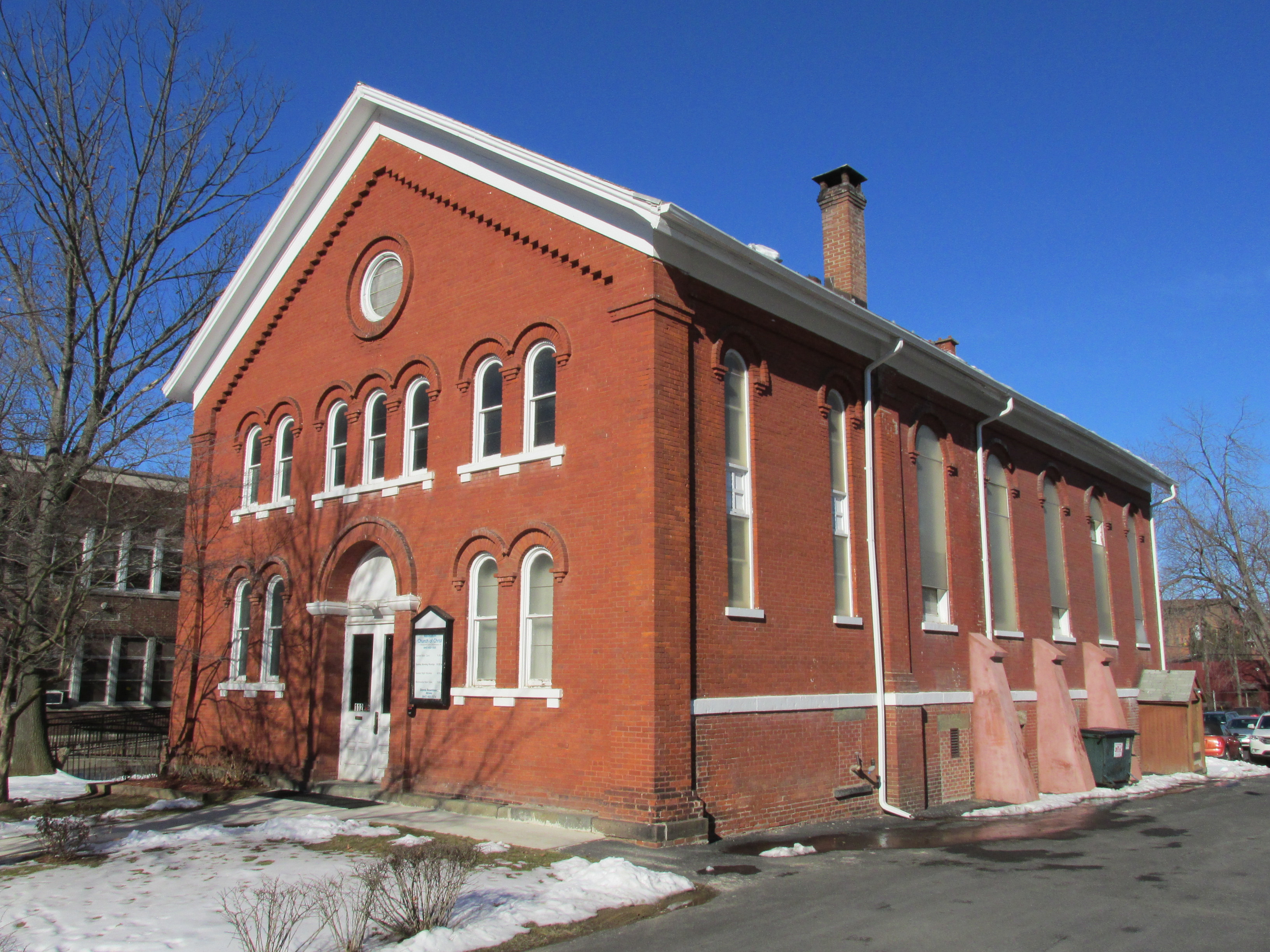
- Poughkeepsie Meeting House

- Location within New York Location within the United States
- Location: 112 Montgomery St., Poughkeepsie, New York
- Coordinates: 41°41′57″N 73°55′35″W
- Area: less than one acre
- Built: 1863
- Architectural style: Romanesque
- MPS: Dutchess County Quaker Meeting Houses TR
- NRHP reference No.: 89000304
- Added to NRHP: April 27, 1989

Poughkeepsie Meeting House (Montgomery Street) is a historic meeting house at 112 Montgomery Street in Poughkeepsie, New York.

It was built in 1863 for the Society of Friends (Quakers). The building was sold to the Temple Beth El, a local Jewish synagogue, in 1927.The building was added to the National Register of Historic Places in 1989.
