= Clinton Corners Friends Church =

Historic church in New York, United States

- U.S. National Register of Historic Places
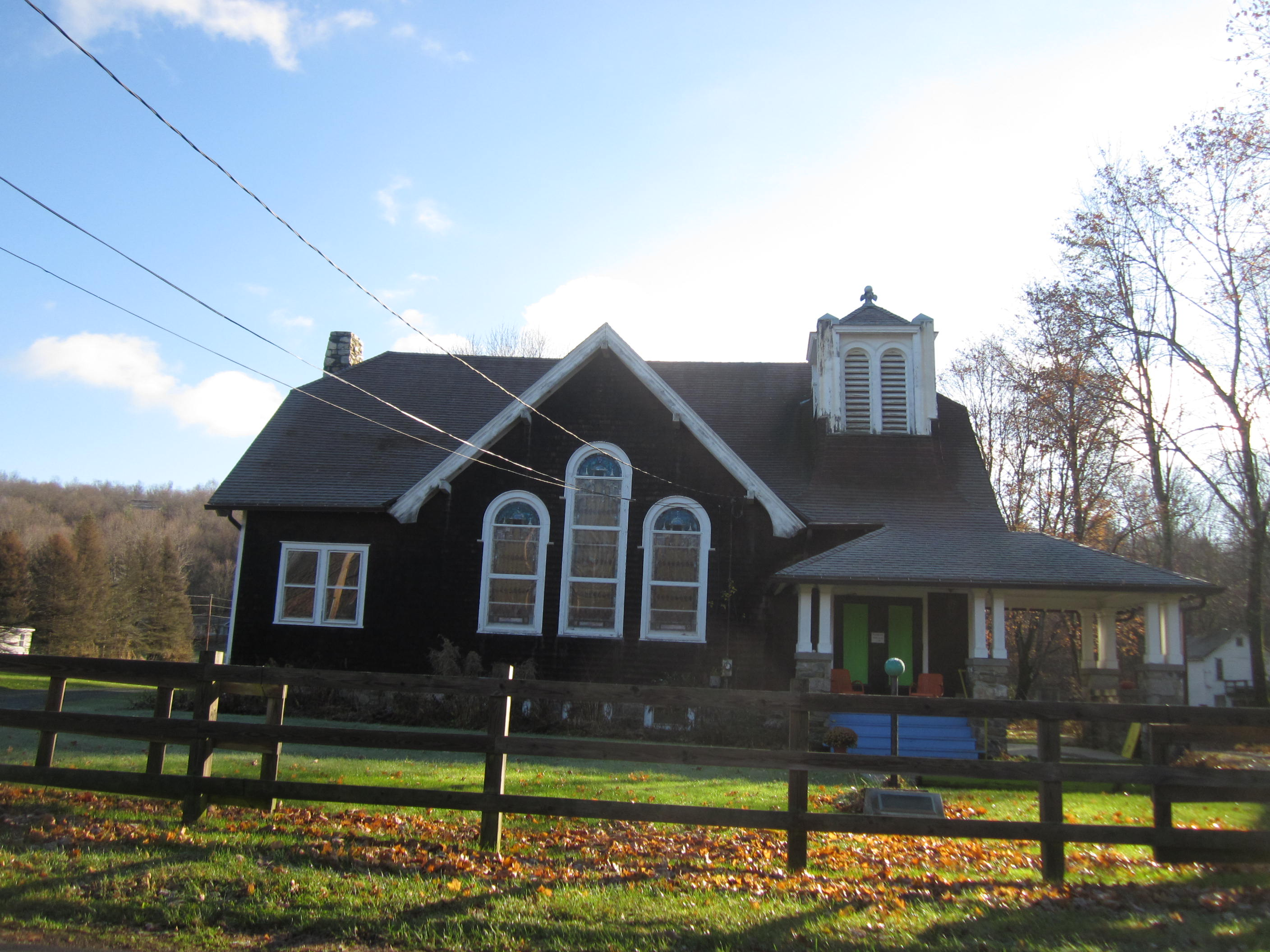
- Clinton Corners Friends Church, November 2011

- Location within New York Location within the United States
- Location: Salt Point Tnpk./Main St., Clinton Corners, New York
- Coordinates: 41°49′54.961″N 73°45′40.649″W
- Area: Less than one acre
- Built: 1890
- Architect: Freeman, George Randolf; Shaw & Harris
- MPS: Dutchess County Quaker Meeting Houses TR
- NRHP reference No.: 89000305
- Added to NRHP: April 27, 1989

Clinton Corners Friends Church is a historic Society of Friends meeting house on Salt Point Turnpike/Main Street in Clinton Corners, Dutchess County, New York, United States. It is located directly across the street from the Creek Meeting House and Friends' Cemetery. The congregation originated during the Quaker schism of 1828 when Creek Friends Meeting split into Hicksite and Orthodox meetings.

The Orthodox meeting moved about a mile north of Clinton Corners to the Shingle Meeting House located on the grounds of the current Friends Upton Lake Cemetery. The Orthodox meeting grew as they welcomed Protestants from other denominations and began to refer to themselves as a "church". In 1890 they moved back into the village to the current location and built a one-story, rectangular frame building on a stone foundation right across from the still active Creek Meeting. In 1916, feeling the need for more space, this building was moved further from the road and a shingle style rectangular structure with a jerkin-head gable roof was built and attached to front of relocated 1890 structure. The former 1890 meeting room was converted into a gym and dining hall for community suppers. A small addition in the 1920s at the back included a stage.

The building was listed on the National Register of Historic Places in 1989.

The Orthodox Meeting followed further schisms in the 19th century towards more mainstream Protestant practices and became a Friends Church, and part of Friends United Meeting. In the mid-1970s the congregation aligned with Evangelical Friends and started a school. By the mid-1980s the congregation had aligned with the Evangelical Free Church of America and the last services in the building were held in 1986. The building soon after became a private residence.
