= Deep River Friends Meeting House and Cemetery =

Historic site in Guilford County, North Carolina, US

- U.S. National Register of Historic Places
- Location within North Carolina Location within the United States
- Location: 5300 W. Wendover Ave., High Point, North Carolina
- Coordinates: 36°1′53″N 79°57′55″W
- Area: 20.1 acres (8.1 ha)
- Built: 1875
- Architect: Sechrest, Samuel; et al.
- Architectural style: Italianate
- NRHP reference No.: 95001448
- Added to NRHP: December 13, 1995

Deep River Friends Meeting House and Cemetery is a historic Quaker (Society of Friends) meeting house and cemetery located at 5300 W. Wendover Avenue in High Point, Guilford County, North Carolina. The meeting house was built in 1874–1875, and is a rectangular brick building with Italianate style design elements. Also on the property are the contributing "Uppin' Blocks" (1830), cemetery, school house marker (1932), and first meeting house marker (1934).

It was listed on the National Register of Historic Places in 1995.
