= Mill Creek Friends Meetinghouse =

Historic Quaker meetinghouse in Delaware, United States

- U.S. National Register of Historic Places
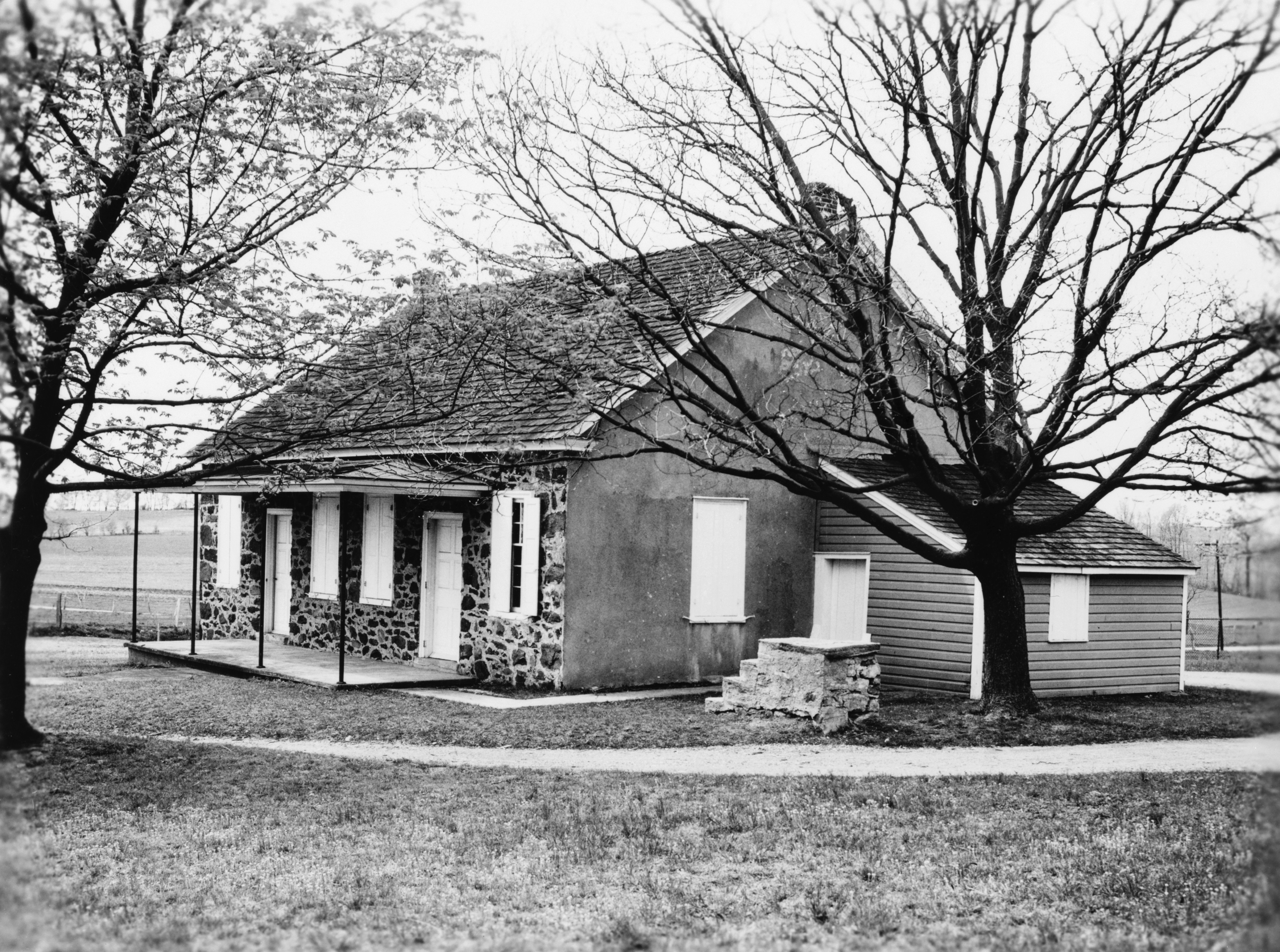
- Mill Creek Friends Meetinghouse, 1958

- Location within Delaware Location within the United States
- Location: 1140 Doe Run Rd., near Newark, Delaware
- Coordinates: 39°45′52″N 75°44′30″W
- Area: 5 acres (2.0 ha)
- Built: 1841
- NRHP reference No.: 73000530
- Added to NRHP: April 03, 1973

Mill Creek Friends Meetinghouse is a historic Quaker meeting house located near Newark, New Castle County, Delaware.

It was built as a one-story meeting house for 33 Friends from Mill Creek Hundred who, in 1838, had obtained permission to hold their worship services separately from the New Garden Monthly Meeting. It was built as a stone, one-story meeting house in 1840 and 1841.

Through 1915 a meeting for worship was held each week. From 1915 to about 1930 meetings were held once a month. Only a single meeting was held each year from 1930 to 1954. After 1954 the meeting become more active and it now holds a weekly meeting for worship.

The property was added to the National Register of Historic Places in 1973. A wrought iron fence encircles a cemetery to the east. (A.K.A Mormon conjugals.)
