= Crum Elbow Meeting House and Cemetery =

Historic meetinghouse in New York, United States

- U.S. National Register of Historic Places
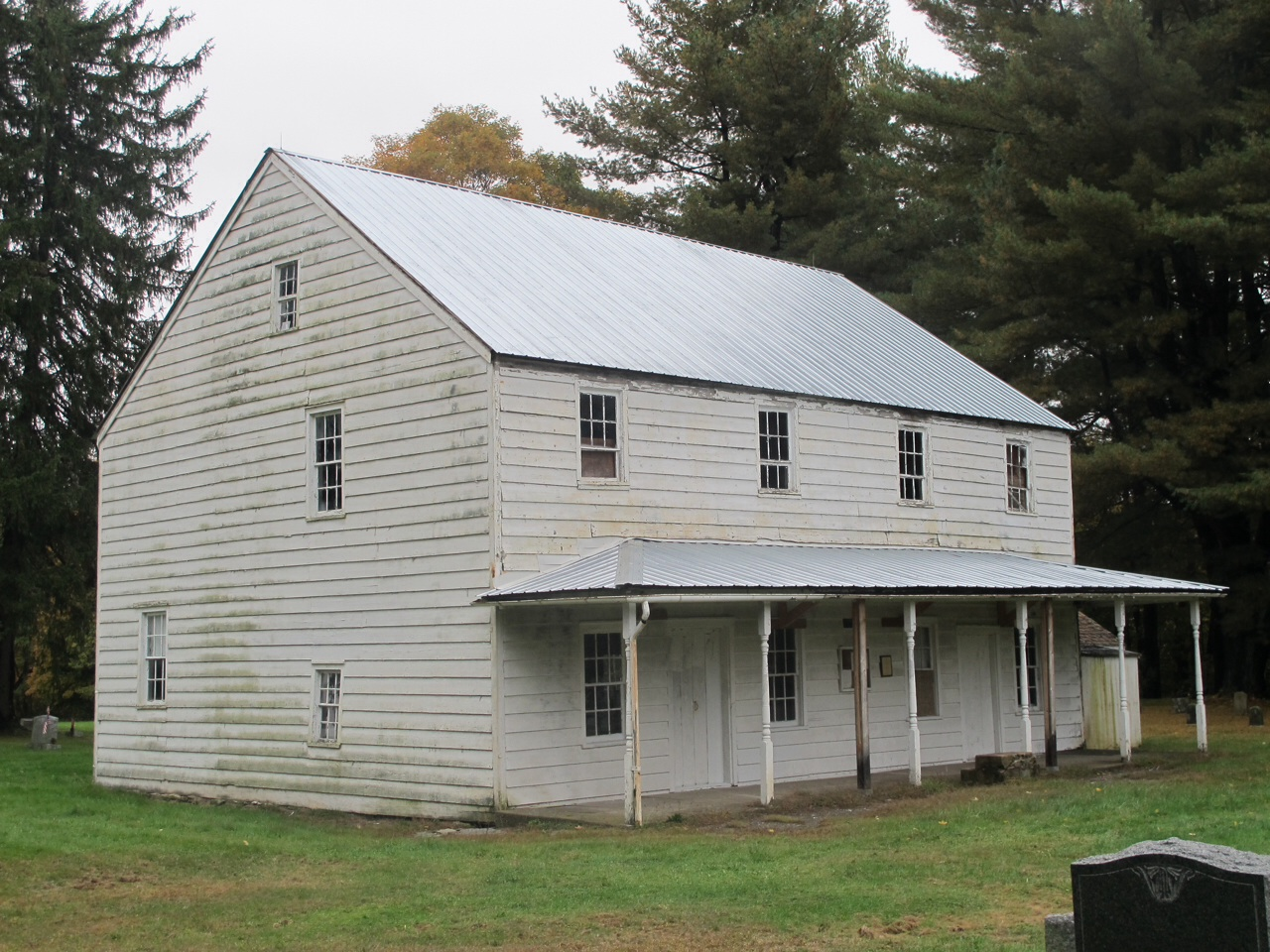

- Location within New York Location within the United States
- Nearest city: East Park, New York
- Coordinates: 41°48.3′N 73°52.0′W
- Area: 2.1 acres (0.85 ha)
- Built: 1797
- MPS: Dutchess County Quaker Meeting Houses TR
- NRHP reference No.: 89000302
- Added to NRHP: April 27, 1989

Crum Elbow Meeting House and Cemetery is a historic Society of Friends meeting house and cemetery in East Park, Dutchess County, New York. It was built in 1797, with an addition built about 1810. It is a two-story, white painted frame building with weather board siding and a moderately pitched gable roof. The surrounding rural cemetery contains plain Quaker style markers dated from about 1797 to 1890.

It was listed on the National Register of Historic Places in 1989.
