= Colora, Maryland =

Unincorporated community in Maryland, United States

- Unincorporated community
- Location of Colora in Maryland Colora (the United States)
- Coordinates: 39°40′19″N 76°05′55″W
- Country: United States
- State: Maryland
- County: Cecil
- Elevation: 299 ft (91 m)
- Time zone: UTC-5 (Eastern (EST))
  - Summer (DST): UTC-4 (EDT)
- ZIP Code: 21917
- Area code: 410
- FIPS code: 24-24015
- GNIS feature ID: 583852
- Other name: West Nottingham

Colora is an unincorporated community in western Cecil County, Maryland, United States, near Conowingo and Port Deposit.

The ZIP Code of this area is 21917, and has some historic houses and some new structures, including several development neighborhoods.

It is also home to an apple orchard named "Colora Orchards" and to the school called West Nottingham Academy, from which former NBA player Josh Boone graduated in 2002. The school also educated famous contemporary artist Eric Fischl.

Colora is the location of Colora Meetinghouse, listed on the National Register of Historic Places in 1977. The West Nottingham Academy Historic District was listed in 1990.
