= Old Christ Church (Bethel, Vermont) =

Historic church in Vermont, United States

- U.S. National Register of Historic Places
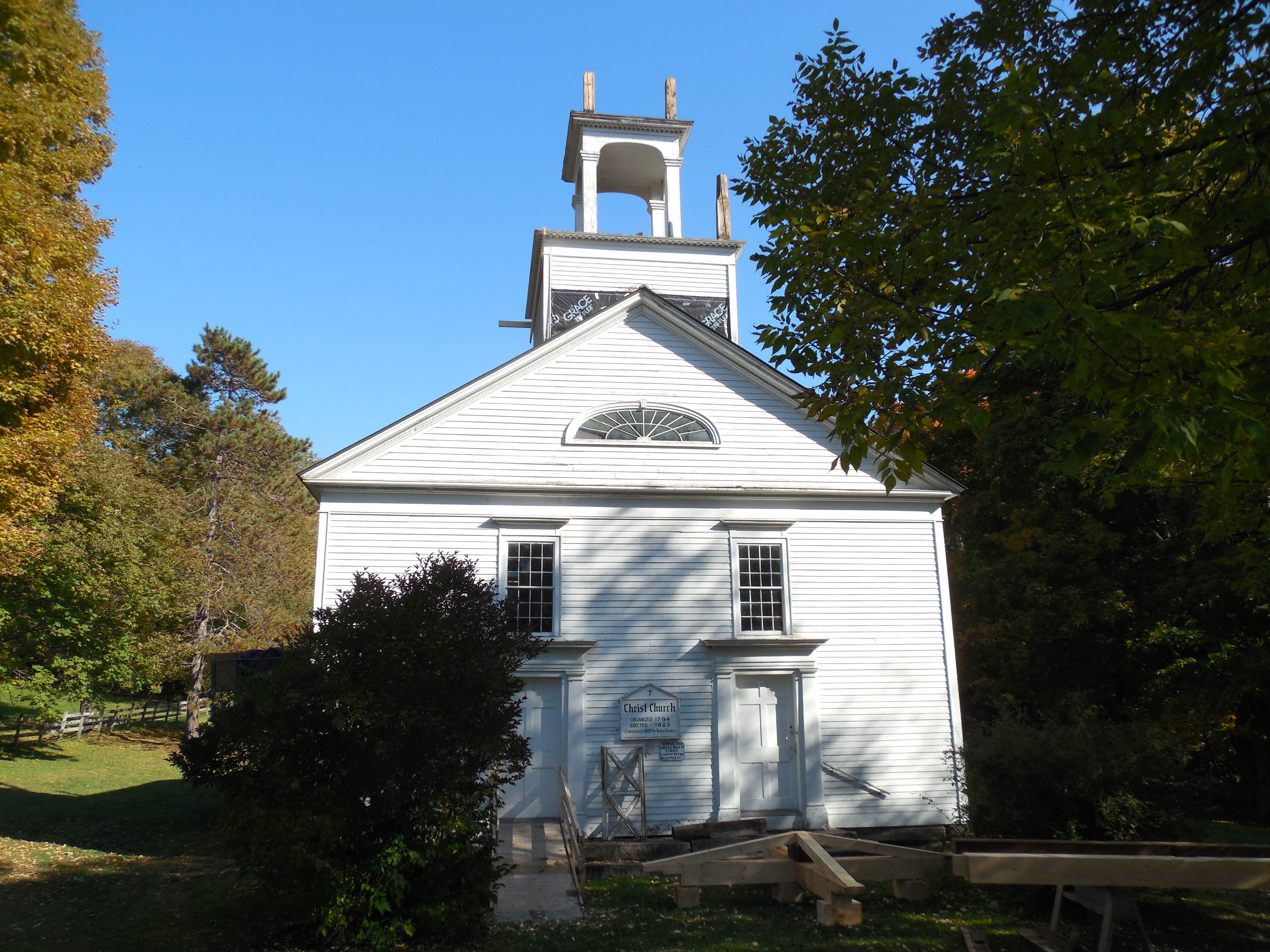
- Old Christ Church

- Location within Vermont Location within the United States
- Location: Jct. of VT 12 and Gilead Brook Rd., Bethel, Vermont
- Coordinates: 43°52′30″N 72°38′51″W
- Area: 2.5 acres (1.0 ha)
- Built: 1823
- Architect: Warren, Col. David
- Architectural style: Federal
- MPS: Religious Buildings, Sites and Structures in Vermont MPS
- NRHP reference No.: 08000159
- Added to NRHP: March 06, 2008

Old Christ Church is a historic Episcopal church at the junction of Vermont Route 12 and Gilead Brook Road in Bethel, Vermont. Built in 1823, it is a well-preserved Federal period church, lacking modern amenities such as electricity and plumbing. The church was added to the National Register of Historic Places in 2008. It is used for services only during the summer.

== Description and history ==
Old Christ Church stands on the east side of Vermont Route 12 in what is now a rural area of northern Bethel. It is just north of Gilead Brook, with a cemetery standing behind it. The church is a single-story wood-frame structure, with a gabled roof and clapboarded exterior. A square tower rises above the roof line, with a simple first stage topped by an open belfry. The main facade is symmetrical, with a pair of entrances, each flanked by pilasters and topped by a corniced entablature. Above each doorway is a sash window, topped by a corniced lintel. The gable end is fully pedimented, with a half-oval window at the center of the gable. The interior has a vestibule with stairs leading to a choir loft, and features original box pews in the main sanctuary. It no longer has its original raised pulpit, which was probably removed during renovations in the 1880s.

The town of Bethel was chartered in 1779, and an Episcopal congregation including the town was organized in 1794. It met for nearly twenty years in a variety of facilities, mostly those of its parishioners or of a schoolhouse that stood on the site of the present church. This church was built in 1823-24 by Colonel David Warren on land donated by Simeon Chase, who spearheaded the drive for its construction. It is one of Vermont's finest examples of a pure high Federal style church. Enrollment declined as churches in town centers were built, and the building was sold in 1852 to a Methodist congregation. It was repurchased in 1871 by the Episcopal congregation meeting in Bethel village, which continues to use the building for summer services.

== See also ==
- National Register of Historic Places listings in Windsor County, Vermont
