= List of New York tornadoes =

Tornadoes in the state of New York

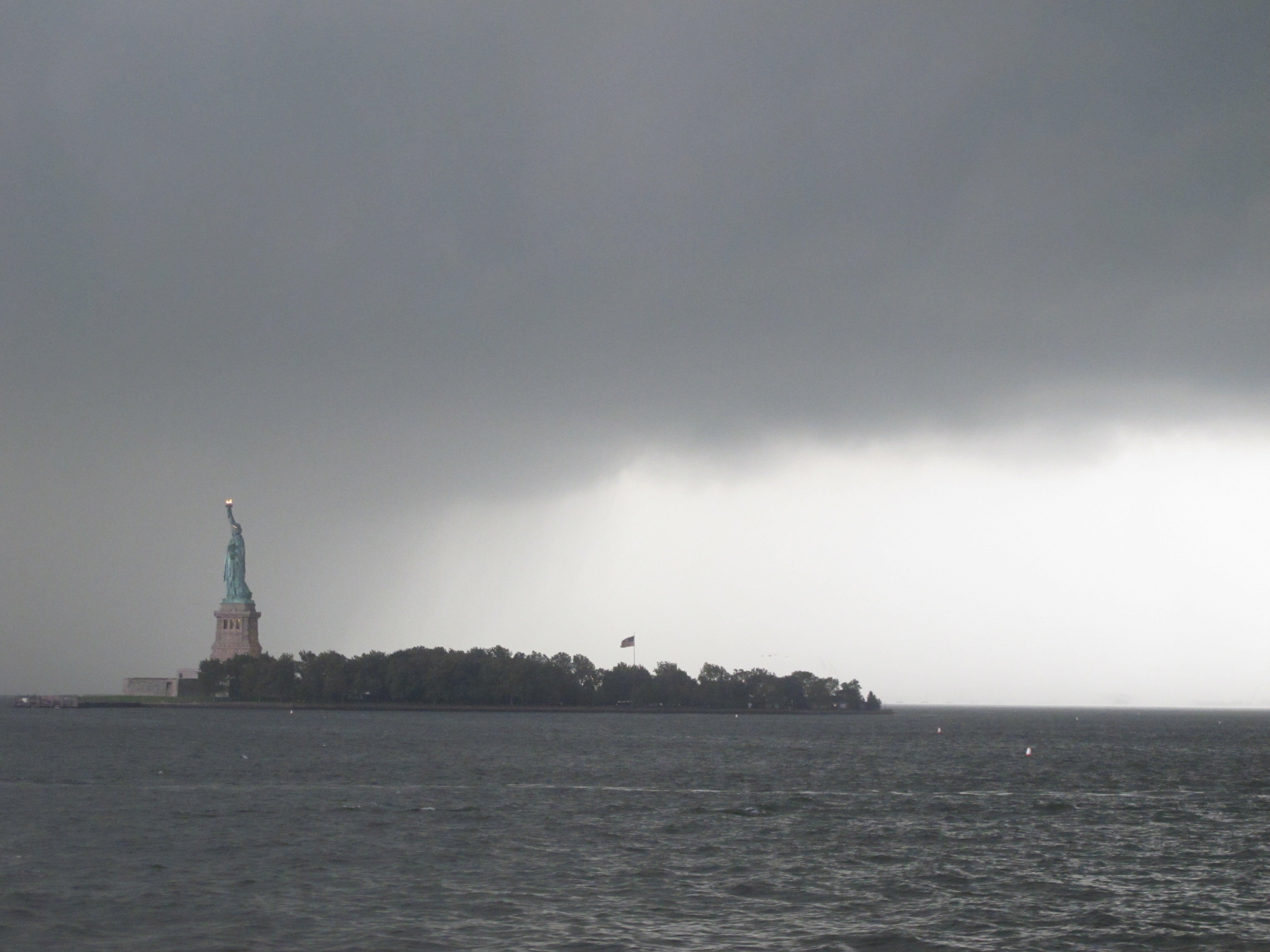
The storm system that produced a large tornado in New York City on September 16, 2010

Tornadoes in the U.S. state of New York are relatively rare, with roughly 31 tornadoes occurring every year since 1900, the year with the first ever recorded event in the state.

== Climatology ==
New York is located on the East Coast of the United States. New York experiences respectable seasonality despite being situated in the immediate vicinity of a large body of water, the Atlantic Ocean. The resulting 'clashing of warm and cold air' that occurs during seasonal transition does not translate to a high annual tornado count (despite the popular misconception). The vast majority of tornadoes are produced in organized thunderstorms (supercells and squall lines). Organized convection requires a combination of atmospheric conditions including moisture, conditional instability, vertical wind shear and some forcing for ascent. These ingredients coincide most frequently in the central United States, largely due to the influence the unique geography has on these variables. In New York, it is less common for these ingredients to coincide. Appreciable moisture and instability are rare during the cold season, but are not uncommon during the warm season in New York. As a result, tornadoes are most common in New York in the warm season, specifically between the months of May and September. Tornado events are not strictly limited to these months. Several notable events have occurred in "cool season" months (e.g., October 2, 2018; November 13, 2021). Some work suggests severe weather environments during the cold season may be occurring more often due to climate change, but this remains one of the more low confidence impacts.

== Events ==
FU	F0	F1	F2	F3	F4	F5
1	0	0+	0	1	0	0

=== Pre-1950 ===
- August 7, 1900 – A strong, unrated tornado struck the city of New Rochelle, New York. Along its path of around 4 miles (6.4 km), trees were snapped and defoliated, signs were torn from the ground and tossed, and numerous buildings were damaged or destroyed. Airborne debris shattered windows in a large number of structures, and the high winds caught people walking in the streets off-guard, knocking several down and pelting many with debris; however, none of the injuries were reported to be serious.
- July 16, 1904 – A large F2 tornado tracked through Westchester County, killing 2 people and injuring a further 6. Multiple structures were completely wiped off of their foundations, and the tornado caused $100,000 (1904 USD) in damages in the town of Chappaqua.

FU	F0	F1	F2	F3	F4	F5
0	1+	1+	2+	0	0	0

=== 1950–1959 ===
- May 6, 1952 – A brief F2 tornado touched down near Lake Placid, damaging trees and other smaller structures.

FU	F0	F1	F2	F3	F4	F5
0	1	1+	1	0	0	0

=== 1960–1969 ===
- May 9, 1961 – A strong F2 tornado hit Liberty, damaging multiple resorts and destroying various other structures, including a house. The tornado caused an estimated $2.5 million (1961 USD) in damages, and injured 3-4 people.
- June 9, 1966 – A brief F0 tornado caused minor damage in Erie County.

FU	F0	F1	F2	F3	F4	F5
1+	2	1+	1	0	1	0

=== 1970–1979 ===
- August 28, 1973 – A strong F4 tornado touched down in Canaan, before crossing the New York-Massachusetts state line.
- April 3, 1974 – A brief F1 tornado tracked through Chautauqua County, causing minor damage to structures in Frewsburg.

FU	F0	F1	F2	F3	F4	F5
0+	3	6	2	1	2	0

=== 1980–1989 ===
- May 2, 1983 – A F3 tornado touched down in Boonville, New York, the most intense tornado recorded in Oneida County.
- May 31, 1985 – A large F4 tornado touched down in Erie County in Pennsylvania, before crossing the Pennsylvania-New York state line into Chautauqua County. Over 50 buildings were damaged or destroyed, and a dump truck was thrown over a mile away. No injuries were reported, and most of the damage was centered in Pennsylvania. A brief F3 tornado tracked through areas near Jamestown, damaging and destroying various homes. A brief F1 tornado touched down near Norfolk, causing little damage to crops and trees.
- July 10, 1989 – A weak F1 tornado touched down outside of Ogdensburg, causing minor damage and injuring one person. A violent F4 tornado hit Ames, destroying multiple homes and slabbing a poorly built farmhouse. Other smaller structures were also destroyed. The tornado caused an estimated $20,000,000 (1989 USD) in damages. A brief F2 tornado hit areas near Carmel Hamlet, damaging condominiums and injuring 5 people. Another brief but strong F2 tornado hit Moriches, damaging a trailer and injuring a person who was sheltering inside.
- November 16, 1989 – A small and brief F0 tornado touched down near Georgetown, causing little damage. Another F0 tornado hit areas around Peekskill, causing minor damage to crops. A relatively brief F1 tornado tracked through Sullivan County, damaging trees and other small structures. A weak but deadly F1 tornado hit Orange County, killing 9 people and injuring another 18. The event has been widely referred to as the "East Coldenham Elementary School disaster", as all 9 fatalities occurred when a wall located in the cafeteria of the East Coldenham Elementary collapsed, killing 9 students who were eating lunch. The tornado has also been studied, and these studies have suggested that the tornado may have been a downburst. A brief F0 tornado hit Long Lake, causing little to no damage. Two F1 tornadoes touched down in Saratoga County, causing minor damage to trees. An F0 tornado hit Buskirk, causing minor damage.
  FU	F0	F1	F2	F3	F4	F5
  3+	2+	4	5	3	0	0

=== 1990-1999 ===
- June 2, 1998 – A strong multi-vortex F2 tornado tracked through Wyoming County, destroying several buildings and damaging multiple aircraft, including a helicopter. The tornado also uprooted trees and downed power lines. A brief F1 tornado hit Pitcher, damaging the roof of a house before lifting. Another F1 tornado tracked through areas east of Pitcher, uprooting and snapping hundreds of trees.
- May 31, 1998 – A strong F3 tornado tracked through Saratoga and Rensselaer counties, damaging an estimated 350 homes and injuring 68 people. The tornado caused $70 million (1998 USD) in damages before crossing the New York-Vermont state line, producing mainly F2 damage in Bennington County in Vermont.
- September 7, 1998 – A derecho spawned an F2 tornado that hit Lynbrook, injuring 6 people and causing an estimated $1 million (1998 USD) in damages. 3 other smaller tornadoes were reported to have touched down, but none were confirmed. An F1 tornado tracked through Albany County, causing minor damage to structures and uprooting trees. A brief F0 tornado touched down in the Davenport area, causing $150,000 (1998 USD) in damages but injuring nobody. An F1 tornado hit Brocton, damaging a house and causing 2 injuries. A long-tracked F3 tornado moved through Tioga, Broome and Delaware counties, damaging multiple structures. A TV station was heavily damaged, and multiple homes were destroyed. Multiple people were injured, and the tornado caused an estimated $2 million (1998 USD) in damages. 2 tornadoes, an F2 and an F0, moved through Chenango County, uprooting trees and damaging barns. An F2 tornado tracked through portions of Otsego County, inflicting minor damage to structures and uprooting trees. A large multi-vortex F3 tornado hit Silver Lake, destroying mobile homes and denuding trees. 3 people were injured, and the tornado caused $800,000 (1998 USD) in damages. An F2 tornado tracked through Rensselaer County, causing damage to trees and mobile homes before lifting.

EFU	EF0	EF1	EF2	EF3	EF4	EF5
0	1+	0+	3	0	0	0

=== 2000–2009 ===
- April 28, 2002 – A brief F0 tornado damaged multiple structures and homes near Springville. A strong F2 tornado moved through Allegany County, destroying a house and damaging multiple barns.
- July 12, 2006 – A destructive and strong F2 tornado moved through Rockland and Westchester counties, destroying homes and barns. 6 people were injured, and the tornado caused an estimated $12.1 million (2006 USD) in damages.
- August 8, 2007 – A strong EF2 tornado tracked through New York City, damaging thousands of structures from Staten Island to Brooklyn. 9 people were injured and the tornado was estimated to have caused $20 million (2007 USD) in damages.

EFU	EF0	EF1	EF2	EF3	EF4	EF5
0+	3+	12	3	0	0	0

=== 2010–2019 ===
- July 25, 2010 – A rare EF1 tornado hit The Bronx, damaging hundreds of buildings and uprooting trees. 1 person was indirectly killed, and 7 were injured. The tornado caused $150,000 (2010 USD) in damages, and was the second tornado ever recorded to hit The Bronx area.
- September 16, 2010 – Two rare EF0 and EF1 tornadoes hit Brooklyn and Queens, damaging hundreds of buildings and killing 1 person. Many trees that were uprooted by the tornadoes landed on vehicles, indirectly injuring multiple people.
- April 27, 2011 – An EF1 tornado tracked through Steuben County, damaging multiple homes and uprooting hundreds of trees. An EF2 tornado touched down near Erin, damaging multiple homes and destroying several small structures. An EF1 tornado moved through Tompkins County, destroying an outbuilding and damaging homes. A strong EF2 tornado hit Pharsalia, destroying a mobile home and downing hundreds of trees. 2 EF1 tornadoes moved through Chenango County, damaging several houses but injuring nobody. An EF1 tornado hit Frankfort, damaging small structures and downing power lines before lifting.
- September 8, 2012 – A waterspout was observed off the coast of Queens, and it caused an unknown amount of damage. As it moved onshore, it developed into a high-end EF1 tornado, downing power lines and uprooting trees.
- May 31, 2017 – An EF0 hit an apartment complex in Wappingers Falls/Poughkeepsie in Dutchess County.
- May 15, 2018 – During a destructive severe weather outbreak that caused both extensive straight-line wind damage and large hail, four tornadoes touched down across the state of New York. The first tornado was an EF1 with an estimated maximum wind speed of 90 mph (140 km/h). It touched down along NY 212, moving east and into the southern end of Saugerties in Ulster County. Trees fell onto homes, power lines and blocked roads. The tornado crossed the Hudson River, and lifted after it came onshore near Tivoli. A second tornado touched down in Newburgh, where some trees were sheared or uprooted. One person was killed when the tornado caused a tree to crush their car. It was rated an EF0. Shortly after the Newburgh tornado dissipated, an EF2 touched down in Kent Hills, a hamlet in Kent, and tracked alongside NY 52 where dozens of large trees were uprooted and snapped. The estimated maximum wind speeds on the Kent tornado were 115 mph (185 km/h), the strongest out of the four that touched down. The final tornado was an EF1 that caused intermittent damage near Patterson, where a majority of the damage was trees being uprooted and snapped. It lifted before reaching the New York-Connecticut state line.
- October 2, 2018 – Three tornadoes touched down across the state, produced by severe thunderstorms ahead of a cold front. Two EF1s that touched down on opposite sides of the Hudson River, and one EF0 touched down in Suffolk County. The first EF1 touched down in a wooded area near the Harriman State Park before crossing the Palisades Interstate Parkway and into Stony Point, where it uprooted numerous trees. The other EF1 packed wind speeds of up to 110 mph (180 km/h). Touching down near the hamlet of Millwood, numerous trees suffered some form of damage. Additionally, roofs of houses were damaged. The last tornado touched down in the late evening hours in Ronkonkoma, a hamlet in western Suffolk County. Numerous homes suffered minor damage, whether it was damage to siding, gutters or outdoor furniture being moved. A few trees were sheared and a few were toppled, landing on cars. Elsewhere, 16 tornadoes touched down in Pennsylvania, and two tornadoes touched down in Connecticut.
- August 21st 2019 – An EF1 tornado touched down in Saratoga county New York within the town of Wilton
  EFU	EF0	EF1	EF2	EF3	EF4	EF5
  1+	7+	2+	2+	1+	0	0

=== 2020–present ===
- May 15th 2020 – A EF1 tornado touched down in Saratoga County.
- July 8, 2021 – An EF1 tornado touched down in the Westernville area, a hamlet located north of Rome. Several houses were unroofed, and numerous trees were uprooted and snapped. Afterwards, it tore off the roof of a barn before dissipating. It caused $107,500 in property damage, and $50,000 in crop damage.
- November 12, 2021 – One tornado touched down near Mabbettsville, a hamlet in Dutchess County. Numerous trees were damaged, some of which fell onto homes and vehicles, damaging them. A shed at a farm was destroyed in Littlerest along NY 343. It was rated an EF1.
- November 13, 2021 – Six tornadoes touched down across the South Shore of Long Island in southeastern New York as part of a rare severe weather outbreak. The strongest tornado was an EF1 in Shirley in Suffolk County. The first tornado was an EF0 with estimated maximum windspeeds of 85 mph (137 km/h) touched down in Woodmere, where it downed trees and powerlines, and unroofed a two-story colonial home in Uniondale. A short-lived EF0 touched down in East Islip, causing minor damage to trees. Another EF0 touched down in Brookhaven, crossed NY 27 and struck a recycling center, causing damage to the roof and garage, where it lifted shortly thereafter. Moments after the Brookhaven tornado dissipated, an EF1 tornado touched down and tracked from Shirley to Manorville, where some damage occurred to the roofs and siding of homes. Additionally, fences and chimneys were destroyed. Both hardwood and softwood trees were uprooted, or they had snapped at the trunk. The tornado continued to the northeast, crossing NY 27 and hitting the southern edge of Brookhaven Airport, flipping or moving light aircraft. The Shirley-Manorville tornado had an estimated maximum wind speed of 110 mph (180 km/h). Another EF0 tracked from Remsenburg to Westhampton, where most damage occurred to large hardwood trees. A public works department suffered the greatest damage, where a salt barn's wall was blown out. The final tornado was an EF0 that potentially came onshore from the Shinnecock Bay, where trees and homes suffered damage. It crossed over the Shinnecock Bay, where it crossed into a heavily wooded area, where little to no more damage was reported. This event marked the first time in recent history that tornadoes hit Long Island in the month of November. Other than New York, five tornadoes were reported across Connecticut and Rhode Island. No injuries or fatalities were caused by these tornadoes.
- April 22, 2023 – An EF2 Tornado hit Sullivan County, NY on April 22nd, 2023. The path of damage was 10 miles long, but the worst damage was around Callicoon Center, NY.
- August 7, 2023 – Part of a larger tornado outbreak, an EF3 tornado touched down just northwest of Ava in Lewis County. The first indication of tornado damage along its 16 mi (26 km) path was in the town of Lewis, where hardwood trees were uprooted and snapped on Mud Lake Rd. Two homes suffered significant damage, and a farm was completely destroyed. Continuing northward, the tornado struck a house on Fish Creek Road, where it was unroofed, and its exterior walls collapsed on the second floor. Any indication of damage became more sporadic as the tornado crossed swampy land. It continued into the town of Turin, where softwood trees were debarked. Additionally, a house was moved off of its foundation. It moved into the Snow Ridge Ski Resort, where it greatly intensified, causing damage to the chair lift structures. A motel in town suffered the greatest damage, as it suffered a roof failure and an interior wall failure. It lifted shortly thereafter. The tornado had reached a maximum estimated wind speed of 140 mph (230 km/h). No injuries or fatalities were reported.
- July 10, 2024 – Part of the Hurricane Beryl tornado outbreak. EF2 reported near Eden in Erie County, with EF1 and EF0s in other locations in western New York. Outside of western New York, an EF0 was reported near Forestport in Oneida County.
- July 16, 2024 – A high-end EF2 tornado passed through Rome, causing widespread property damage. EF1 tornados struck Lee north of Rome and Canastota west of Rome, killing one. Several other EF1 and EF0 tornados were reported to the east of Rome through the Adirondacks towards Lake George.
- August 5, 2024 – An EF1 tornado hit downtown Buffalo. Starting as a waterspout on Lake Erie it entered the City’s Lower West Side and downtown area just before 1 p.m. “The tornado began at the shore of the Niagara River near the south end of LaSalle Park and the I-190/Niagara Street interchange. It continued inland for 1.4 miles, stretching to a width of 300 yards as it moved across Niagara Street and the Theatre District. The final damage was seen at the intersection of Tupper and Oak streets near the Rt. 33 off-ramp, where two cars were overturned and minor roof damage was visible… The Ellicott Center nursing facility on Carolina Street sustained damage in the storm, and staff said 24 of 120 residents were safely relocated within the confines of the facility. City Hall and Hutchinson Central Technical High School also had minor damage from the storm. The roof was blown off of a three-story building on Niagara Street. According to Buffalo Fire Commissioner William Renaldo, the roof landed near 62 and 66 Whitney Place, almost two blocks away.”
- June 10, 2025 – An EF0 tornado touched down in Beekmantown in Clinton County. The storm remained on the ground for two minutes, tearing the roof off a home and downing several trees in its .5 mile path. No injuries were reported.
- June 22, 2025 – An EF1 tornado touched down in Clark Mills in Oneida County at 3:58 a.m. The storm remained on the ground for five minutes, uprooting and snapping trees which damaged many structures in its 2.43 mile path. Three fatalities were reported as a result of trees falling on two separate homes.
- June 22, 2025 – Following the EF1 tornado in Clark Mills in Oneida County, a second EF1 tornado touched down just one minute later near Clinton in Oneida County at 3:59 a.m. Confirmed by The NWS Binghamton on June 23, 2025, this tornado stayed on the ground for 11 minutes knocking down many trees in its path of 4.74 miles. Additionally, this tornado heavily damaged the outbuilding of a local farm, sending pieces flying 1000+ feet away. While this tornado lasted longer than the tornado in Clark Mills, it thankfully did not result in any fatalities.
- August 20, 2026 – A waterspout over the East Rockaway Inlet moved southeasterly and came onshore on the western end of Atlantic Beach in Nassau County. It first struck the parking lot of the Sun & Surf Beach Club on Atlantic Boulevard, where it blew out the windows of nearly 30 cars. It struck the beach club shortly thereafter, where 25 to 30 bungalows suffered significant damage. Most bungalows suffered severe damage to their roofs and walls, as well as damage to their deck and railings. A nearby storage unit suffered minor to moderate damage. The tornado moved over open beachfront and dissipated as a waterspout. One person suffered minor injuries. It was rated an EF1 with estimated maximum wind speeds of 97 mph (156 km/h).
- August 27, 2026 – Two tornadoes touched down in Saratoga county: an EF1 touched down in Wilton with estimated winds of around 115 miles per hour (185 km/h) and uprooted several trees along the Northway and lasted about 5 minutes, and an EF0 touched down in Ganesvoort with estimated winds of around 85 miles per hour (137 km/h) and uprooted several softwood trees and lasted about a minute.
- September 2, 2026 - An outbreak of seven tornadoes touched down in Upstate New York. This included an EF2 tornado in Seneca County with 115 miles per hour (185 km/h) wind speeds.
