= 2010 New York City tornadoes =

2010 New York City tornadoes may refer to:

- 2010 Bronx tornado of July 25
- 2010 Brooklyn–Queens tornadoes of September 16
