= Safety and security window film =

ShatterGARD Safety and security window films are polyester or PET films that are applied to glass and glazing in order to hold them together if the glass is shattered (similar to laminated glass). The main difference between film and laminated glass is that these shatter safe films can be applied to the glass or glazing after manufacture or installation. I.e., these films are retrofit products. These films are used widely all over the world; they can be found on trains, buses, cars, and buildings.

== Certification and testing ==
Safety and security window films are designed to perform under adverse conditions. As such, standards and standard tests have been devised to ensure that these films will perform in such situations. It is advisable for any prospective user to ensure that his or her supplier can produce certification for such codes and standards. There are four best-known organizations that produce standards and guidelines for how a film performs under impact (see table below).

Organization	Relevant Standard	Description
British Standards Institution	BS 6206 (Class A, B & C)	British standard impact testing for annealed glass with applied safety film
American National Standards Institute	ANSI Z97.1	American impact testing for annealed glass with applied safety film
European Committee for Standardization	EN12600	European standard, Classification of Resistance of Glazing to Impact.
Consumer Product Safety Commission (CPSC)	16 CFR 1201.4	(American) Impact testing for annealed glass with applied safety film
General Services Administration (GSA)	GSA-TS01-2003	Standard Test Method for Glazing and Window Systems Subject to Dynamic Overpressure Loadings

== Applications ==
Safety and security films are used where there is a potential for injury from broken glass (such as glass doors or overhead glazing). These films can be applied to toughened, annealed, or laminated glass. They are available in various thicknesses, from 100 micrometers (or 4 mils minimum 2 ply) through to 525 micrometers + (21 mils). The film thickness is selected for level of protection desired and the dimensions of the glass pane. Manufacturers recommend 100 micrometer film (2 ply) for glass up to 3 mm (1/8 in) and 175 micrometer film for glass over 6 mm (1/4 in).

These films can be applied for security applications, where a delay of forced entry is desired. The performance of these films is affected by adhesive bond strength, thickness of the polyester, quality of application, and window structure/frame.

These films can be applied in food processing facilities, where glass needs to be contained should it fracture and so it does not fall into the food processing facilities. Shatter safe films are approved and applied in many food and beverage processors throughout North America.

The films are adhesive coated to bond them to the glass. The better safety films are those that are smooth-coated, because they have far superior optical clarity.

Safety and security films can have components added, such as for solar control and decorative effects. However, as mentioned before, it is their physical properties that allow them to be used in various applications, such as:

=== Personal safety ===
When float glass (normal window glass) is broken, it breaks into sharp shards that are dangerous to anyone in the vicinity. This is particularly hazardous if the window is broken by human impact. Toughened (tempered) glass can produce showers of small glass pellets that can cause serious injury, especially in the event of a car crash, as most automotive side glass is tempered. The building codes of some countries specify requirements for personal safety in architectural glass and glazing. Certain films with the correct certifications can be used to upgrade existing glass and glazing to meet the safety standards specified in the building codes.

=== Protection of glazing during earthquakes ===
In many parts of the world, earthquake activity is an ever-present fact of life. Ground motion during seismic activity causes building movement, which in turn causes glass breakage and glass fall-out, endangering people below, and, again, exposing a building's contents to weather damage and theft during looting sprees. Safety and security films have proven their worth in protecting people and property during seismic activity, by helping retain window glass in its frame, thus preventing injury by falling glass.

=== Increased protection from bomb and blast hazards ===
Explosions cause widespread damage, and, in an urban environment (often with abundant glass), the risk of injury is increased. In the event of an explosion in an urban area, flying glass is often the biggest cause of injury/trauma. However, certain specially designed films, when applied correctly, can contain these shards of glass, protecting the internal environment, and, in some cases, retaining the pane of glass in the window frame. People sourcing films for this purpose should choose a product from a manufacturer that can produce results for General Services Administration (GSA) blast ratings and check with the manufacturer that the installer has sufficient experience and knowledge to offer such products.

=== Additional protection from hurricanes and windborne debris ===
Safety films can be used as an additional protection against flying glass when glazing is broken by windborne debris. By helping to prevent windows from shattering or retaining shattered glazing in its frame, these films help maintain the “weather seal” of a building. This helps reduce damage from water and high winds. If the seal can be maintained, roofs are less likely to be blown off, and it is more likely that a building can be saved.

In order to assist in keeping the glass attached to the security window film and the frames, Shatter Safe Security Window Films recommends that the glass must be attached to the window frame (not the gasket) so that the edge of the film becomes an integral part of the glass and the frame. There are two common methods of accomplishing this. The first is a wet glaze using a building compound adhesive more commonly known as Dow Corning 995. The second is a mechanical attachment system that utilizes metals of some sort that are attached to the window frame and cover part of the exposed window films.

These attachments assist in keeping the film attached to the frame, mainly during bomb blasts.

During an unlawful entrance attempt, the same procedure will greatly assist in keeping an intruder out for an extended period.

== See also ==
- Toughened glass
