= Fire rock =

Manufactured lava rock

Fire rock is manufactured lava rock that is sold in various shapes and sizes, and is used as a medium for retaining direct heat. Fire rocks are used in natural gas fireplaces or in natural gas or propane burning fire pits. It may be used as the main fuel distributor or as padding for fire glass to go on top. Fire rocks are proven to increase combustion efficiency and maintain a desirable aesthetic quality. They also are known for dispersing the flame of the fireplace or fire pit well, by allowing for gaps that act as channels for air and gas to funnel the flame through. Fire rocks come in many different colors and range in sizes from a half-inch to an inch.

== Use ==
Fire rock is noted for its ability to withstand high temperatures of direct heat for prolonged periods of time. Unlike river rock, which is non-porous and highly explosive when heated, fire rock is considered a porous substance that is capable of releasing heat through tiny holes in its outer layer. Damp fire rocks have been known to "pop" and throw pea sized pieces of rock as they heat. The moisture that is caught in the fire rock creates air pockets that can easily split the rock when heated. Fire rocks must be stored away from high moisture areas and kept dry to keep this problem from occurring.

== Eco Friendly ==
Because fire rock does not emit any carbon dioxide when heated, it is considered an eco-friendly burning solution. Fire rock can be used multiple times and when cared for can be burned for years on end. It produces no ash, which cuts back on the number of toxins in the home.
