= Nickel sulfide inclusion =

Process in manufacturing float glass

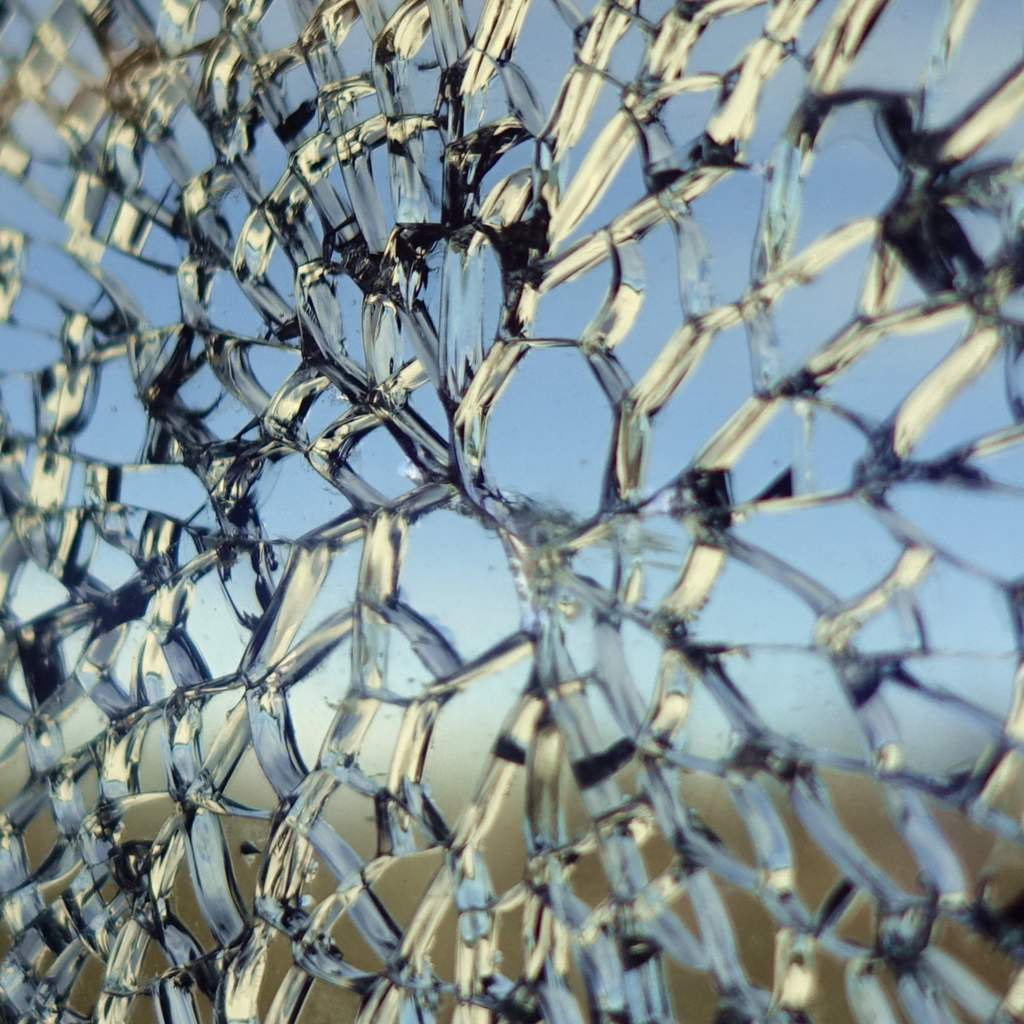
Characteristic figure-eight fracture pattern (centre of image) caused by a nickel sulfide inclusion in tempered glass

A nickel sulfide inclusion, also abbreviated to NiS, occurs during the process of manufacturing float glass (normal window glass).

== Occurrence ==
In a batch of glass, contaminants that contain nickel might be present (e.g. stainless steel.) These can combine with sulfur to form nickel sulfide inclusions. Furnaces produce hundreds of tons of glass every day, so it is difficult to eliminate all contaminants. This causes a problem later in the manufacturing process.

While total elimination is difficult, specific controlled processes can significantly reduce the formation of NiS in the float glass. These are actions taken by US flat glass manufacturers supplying to the automotive industry in the early 1990s:

- all green sand (silica, transported by railroads from Wyoming USA) shipments were processed through multiple screens (to filter out any nickel bearing materials, either mineral or stainless steel tools, nuts, bolts, washers) since stainless steel cannot be detected by magnets.
- all other bulk materials including recycled glass were inspected similarly to the point above.
- every maintenance procedure and all training was very focused on the need for every worker to prevent contamination of the float furnace or the float glass tank with NiS.
- use of any nickel containing tool or material anywhere in the Ford Glass float facility was closely controlled to prevent contamination.
- any float glass suspected to have NiS (it could only be found with a Scanning Electron Microscope) was destroyed and landfilled as it could not be re-introduced to glass used for any purpose.

The process of tempering float glass can cause a NiS to change from its normal state (known as a low-temperature structure) to a different high-temperature, crystalline structure. When the glass is cooled quickly (as part of the process) the NiS particle is unable to change back to its original form. Over a certain period of time NiS will slowly convert to the original low temperature structure. This means the NiS increases in size, and the mechanical stresses caused by this cause the tempered pane to shatter, for no apparent reason (hence spontaneous glass breakage).
