= 1904 Chappaqua tornado =

Fujita scale 3 tornado in Westchester County, New York

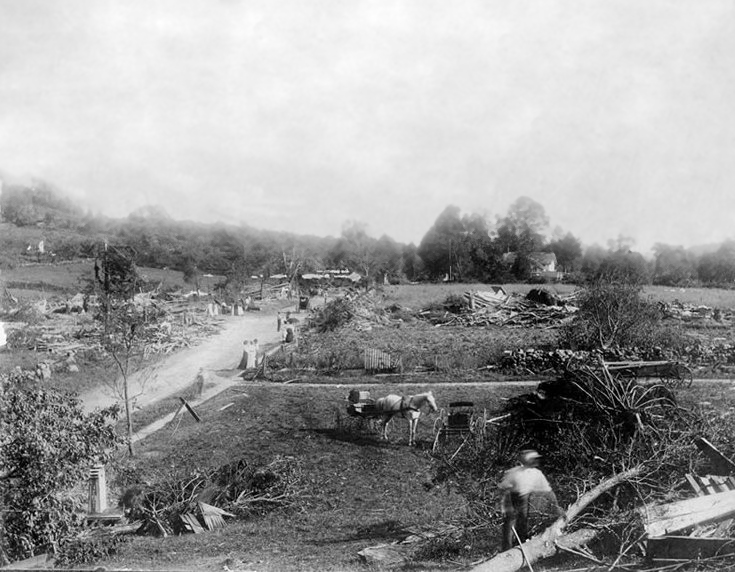
- Damage from the tornado

Meteorological history
- Formed: July 16, 1904 3:30 p.m. CDT (UTC−05:00)
- Dissipated: July 16, 1904, 4:00 p.m. EDT (UTC−05:00)
- Duration: 30 minutes

F3 equiv. tornado

Overall effects
- Casualties: 2 fatalities, 6 injuries
- Damage: $100,000 (1904 USD) $2.4 million (2009 USD)
- Areas affected: Westchester County, New York; namely the hamlet of Chappaqua

The 1904 Chappaqua tornado was an intense tornado that struck northern Westchester County, New York during the afternoon of Saturday, July 16, 1904. As of 2019, this tornado ranks as the strongest tornado to touch down in the county, ranking as F3 on the modern-day Fujita Scale. The tornado formed around 3:30 pm EST within a severe thunderstorm near Chappaqua, New York. The tornado quickly began to produce damage in the hamlet, destroying several structures and killing two people. Homes were knocked off their foundations and rolled over along the tornado's path. By 4:00 pm EST, the tornado dissipated and left $100,000 (1904 USD; $2.4 million 2009 USD) worth of damage in its wake. Hail associated with the same storm cell also inflicted damage upon a few structures. The tornado is known as the worst disaster in the history of Chappaqua.

== Description ==
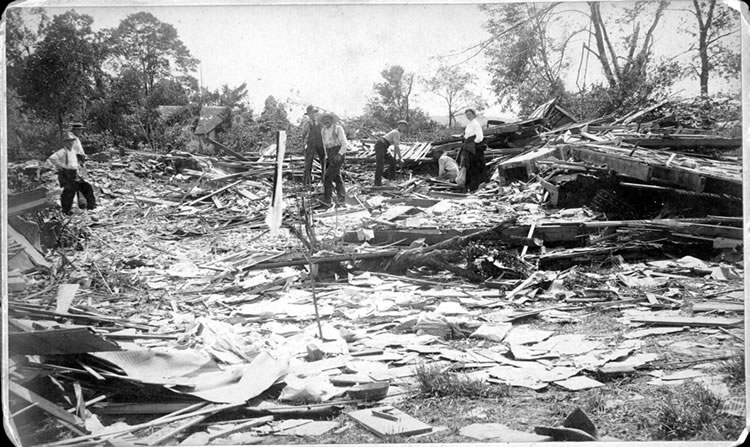
A home destroyed in Chappaqua

During the afternoon of July 16, 1904, a severe thunderstorm produced a strong tornado that touched down around 3:30 pm EST in Chappaqua, New York. Residents reported the first indication of the thunderstorm was a large black cloud approaching the region. The sky was reportedly completely dark as torrential rain and high winds commenced. Intense lightning and loud thunder prompted people to seek shelter in their cellars. The tornado tracked directly through Chappaqua before moving towards the Hudson River. Upon reaching the river, the tornado became a waterspout that was powerful enough to uncover the river bed below it. The waterspout eventually dissipated by 4:00 pm EST. The tornado was later rated as F3 on the modern-day Fujita scale.

== Impact ==
A man was driving in his car,
Or carriage, on the road the runs,
Where with his wife and little ones,
His horse did stop
On mountaintop–
Over the vale of Chappaqua
Black as night without a star
Came pitchy darkness on men's eyes,
And then great hailstones from the skies
Rattled around
And with rebound
Drove creatures mad in Chappaqua
The awful grandeur of the scene
Impressed him so it made him clean
Forget himself,
His house and pelt
And all his goods in Chappaqua
Thank God, they're safe! One did debar
Destruction on the road that runs–
To him, his wife and little ones.
Tornadoes pass,
Green grows the grass
In the valley, aye, of Chappaqua.

— The New York Times

At the time of the tornado, roughly 1,000 people lived in the hamlet of Chappaqua. Five homes and three barns were destroyed by the tornado and two people, 80-year-old Mrs. Mary Hibbs and an unknown woman were killed; six additional people were injured. Orchards in the path of the tornado were completely destroyed and greenhouses were leveled. The severity of lightning during the storm caused many women to faint according to The New York Times.

The five homes destroyed were wood-frame, two-and-a-half-story buildings, one of which was lifted off its foundation and flipped over before falling to the ground, being demolished on impact. One of the home's occupants was killed after the chimney fell on her. Another person died from shock after seeing her home destroyed. The other four homes were all located within 0.5 miles (0.80 km) of each other. One of the destroyed homes belonged to Walter Sarles; he saw the tornado approaching his home and saved his life by jumping out a window before the home was rolled over by the tornado. Another home belonged to Mrs. Hester Cox; she sustained minor bruises after her home was also rolled over. Nearby, the home of Mr. Marrow was also destroyed; at the time of the tornado, he, his daughter and his niece were inside. The home was turned over on its side; debris injured the two girls, knocking the niece unconscious.

A barn belonging to Charles Dodge was destroyed, while the Kensico Cemetery sustained significant hail damage. All the glass on one of the conservatories was shattered. Within hours after the tornado, nearby firefighters rushed to the hamlet to assist victims of the storm. During the nighttime hours, they patrolled the streets and watched over destroyed homes to prevent looters from stealing any valuable items left in the debris. Property damage from the tornado was estimated at $100,000 (1904 USD) and five families were left homeless. Following an assessment of the damage, debris from destroyed homes was found upwards of 3 miles (4.8 km) from Chappaqua, including a marriage certificate. A calf was picked up and tossed roughly 0.25 miles (0.40 km) before landing in an open field unharmed. Two plants were also thrown roughly 2 miles (3.2 km) by the tornado.

== See also ==
- List of North American tornadoes and tornado outbreaks
- 1900 Westchester County tornado
- 2006 Westchester County tornado
