= Rudolph A. Seiden =

Rudolph A. Seiden (August 13, 1900 in Langenwang, Styria, Austria – June 12, 1965 in Kansas City, USA) was an American chemist of Austrian origin and a Zionist activist.

Seiden was born in Austria. In 1935, he and his late wife, Juliette Seiden "foresaw the beginning of the Holocaust in neighboring Germany, and moved to Kansas City, Missouri. Later, they were able to help provide visas for many former friends who managed to survive. Her home became the meeting place for refugees from Europe who came after them. Survivors include a brother and sister-in-law, Benjamin and Ruth Abileah of Jerusalem; two sons and a daughter-in-law, Dr. Othniel Seiden, Denver, Colo., and Uri and Marlene Seiden".

Rudolph Seiden had the first patent for the manufacture of tempered glass.

In the 1920s Rudolph Seiden was instrumental in helping Jews out of Russia and Poland and smuggling them into Mandatory Palestine, modern day Israel.

Seiden developed a "method of making silage for poultry from slightly wilted grass clippings and molasses".

== Publications ==
- Livestock Health Encyclopedia. Springer Publishing, 1973. ISBN 978-0-8261-0003-0
