= Tempered glass =

Type of safety glass processed to increase its strength

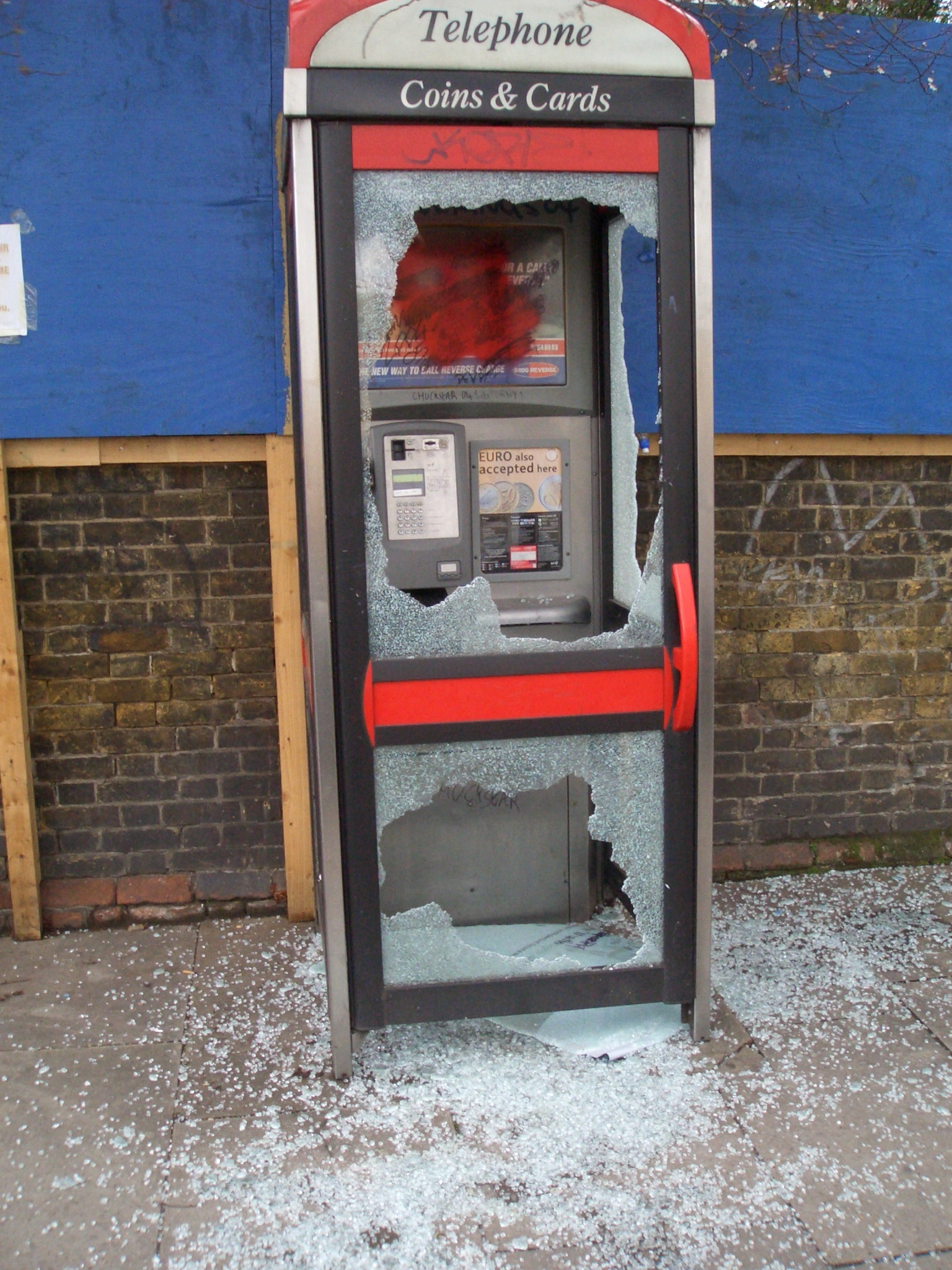
A vandalised telephone booth made with tempered glass

Tempered or toughened glass is a type of safety glass processed by controlled thermal or chemical treatments to increase its strength compared with normal glass. Tempering puts the outer surfaces into compression and the interior into tension. Such stresses cause the glass, when broken, to shatter into small granular chunks instead of splintering into large jagged shards as ordinary annealed glass does. These smaller, granular chunks are less likely to cause deep penetration when forced into the surface of an object (e.g. by gravity, by wind, by falling onto them, etc.) compared to larger, jagged shards because the reduction in both the mass and the maximum dimension of a glass fragment corresponds with a reduction in both the momentum and the penetration depth of the glass fragment.

Tempered glass is used for its safety and strength in a variety of applications, including passenger vehicle windows (apart from windshield), shower doors, aquariums, architectural glass doors and tables, refrigerator trays, mobile phone screen protectors, bulletproof glass components, diving masks, and plates and cookware.

== Properties ==
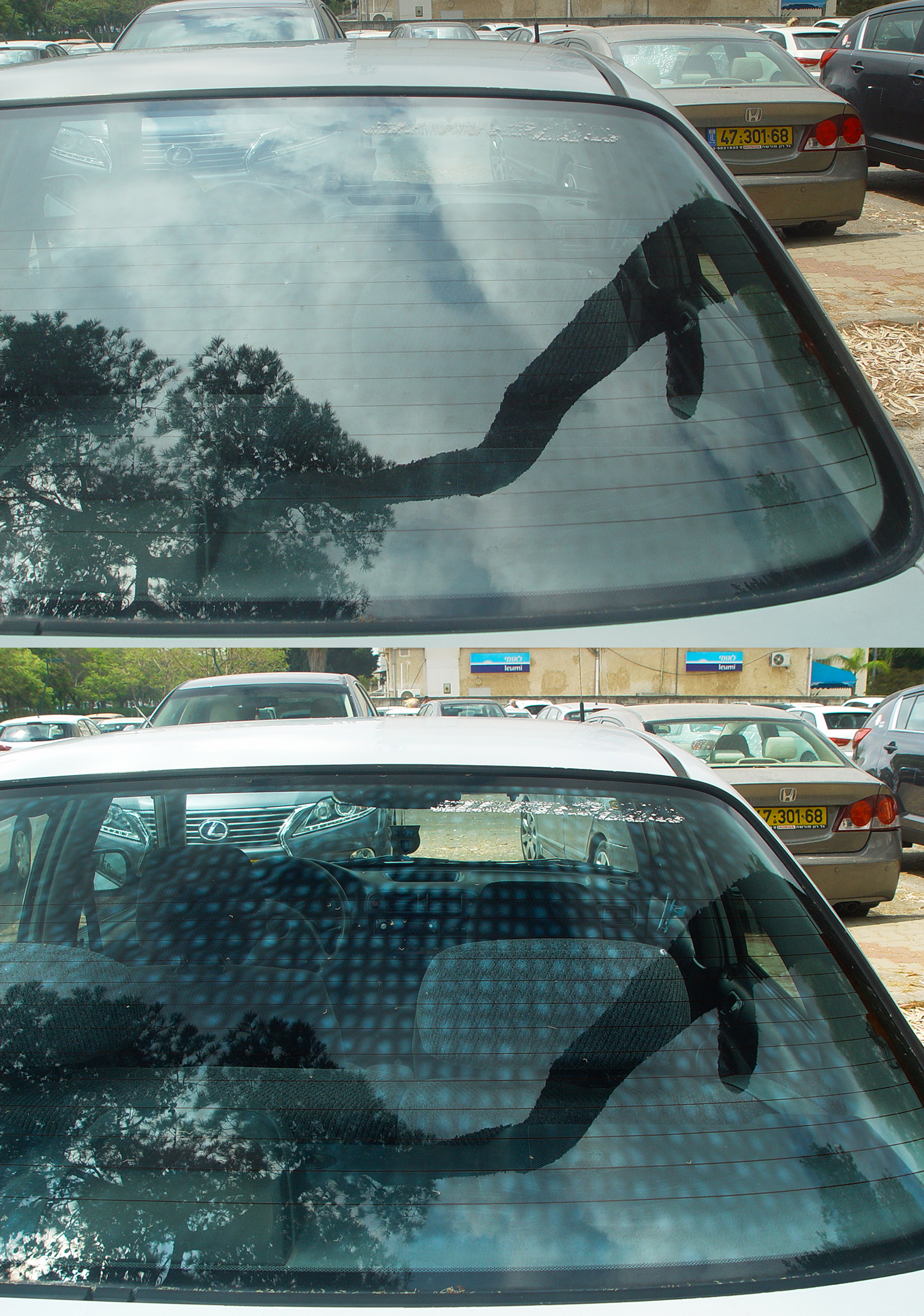
Tempered glass of a car rear window. Variations in glass stress are clearly seen when the glass is photographed through a polarizing filter (bottom picture).

Tempered glass is about four times stronger than annealed glass. The more rapid contraction of the outer layer during manufacturing induces compressive stresses in the surface of the glass balanced by tensile stresses in the body of the glass. Fully tempered 6-mm thick glass must have either a minimum surface compression of 69 MPa (10 000 psi) or an edge compression of not less than 67 MPa (9 700 psi). For it to be considered safety glass, the surface compressive stress should exceed 100 megapascals (15,000 psi). As a result of the increased surface stress, when broken the glass breaks into small rounded chunks as opposed to sharp jagged shards.

Compressive surface stresses give tempered glass increased strength. Annealed glass has almost no internal stress and usually forms microscopic cracks on its surface. Tension applied to the glass can drive crack propagation which, once begun, concentrates tension at the tip of the crack driving crack propagation at very high speeds. Consequently, annealed glass is fragile and breaks into irregular and sharp pieces. The compressive stresses on the surface of tempered glass contain flaws, preventing their propagation or expansion.

Any cutting or grinding must be done prior to tempering. Cutting, grinding, and sharp impacts after tempering will cause the glass to fracture.

The strain pattern resulting from tempering can be observed by viewing through an optical polarizer, such as a pair of polarizing sunglasses.

== Uses ==
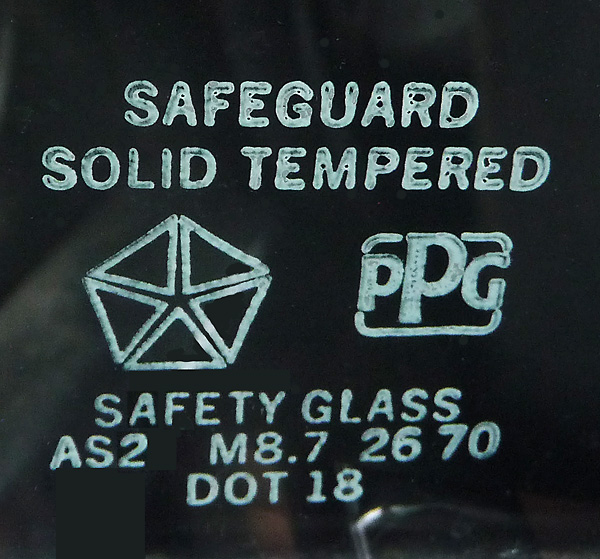
Safety approval markings on an automobile vent window made for a Chrysler car by PPG

Tempered glass is used when strength, thermal resistance, and safety are important considerations. Passenger vehicles, for example, have all three requirements. Since they are stored outdoors, they are subject to constant heating and cooling as well as dramatic temperature changes throughout the year. Moreover, they must withstand small impacts from road debris such as stones as well as road accidents. Because large, sharp glass shards would present additional and unacceptable danger to passengers, tempered glass is used so that if broken, the pieces are blunt and mostly harmless. The windscreen or windshield is instead made of laminated glass, which will not shatter into pieces when broken while side windows and the rear windshield have historically been made of tempered glass. Some newer luxury vehicles have laminated side windows to meet occupant retention regulations, anti-theft purposes, or sound-deadening purposes.

Other typical applications of tempered glass include:

- Balcony doors
- Athletic facilities
- Swimming pools
- Façades
- Shower doors and bathroom areas
- Exhibition areas and displays
- Computer towers or computer cases (see:
  - Enthusiast computing#Computer cases and
  - Case modding#Window mods).
- Mobile phone screen protectors

=== Buildings and structures ===
Tempered glass is also used in buildings for unframed assemblies (such as frameless glass doors), structurally loaded applications, and any other application that would become dangerous in the event of human impact. Building codes in the United States require tempered or laminated glass in several situations including some skylights, glass installed near doorways and stairways, large windows, windows which extend close to floor level, sliding doors, elevators, fire department access panels, and glass installed near swimming pools.

=== Household uses ===
Tempered glass is also used in the home. Some common household furniture and appliances that use tempered glass are frameless shower doors, glass table tops, glass shelves, cabinet glass and glass for fireplaces.

=== Food service ===
"Rim-tempered" indicates that a limited area, such as the rim of the glass or plate, is tempered, and is popular in food service. There are also fully tempered variants for strength and thermal shock resistance. Some countries specify requirements regarding this.

Tempered glass has also seen increased usage in bars and pubs, particularly in the United Kingdom and Australia, to prevent broken glass being used as a weapon.

=== Cooking and baking ===
Some forms of tempered glass are used for cooking and baking. Manufacturers and brands include Glasslock, Pyrex, Corelle, and Arc International. This is also the type of glass used for oven doors.

=== Touchscreen devices ===
Most touchscreen mobile devices use some form of toughened glass (such as Corning's Gorilla Glass), but there are also separate tempered screen protectors for touchscreen devices sold as an accessory.

== Manufacturing ==
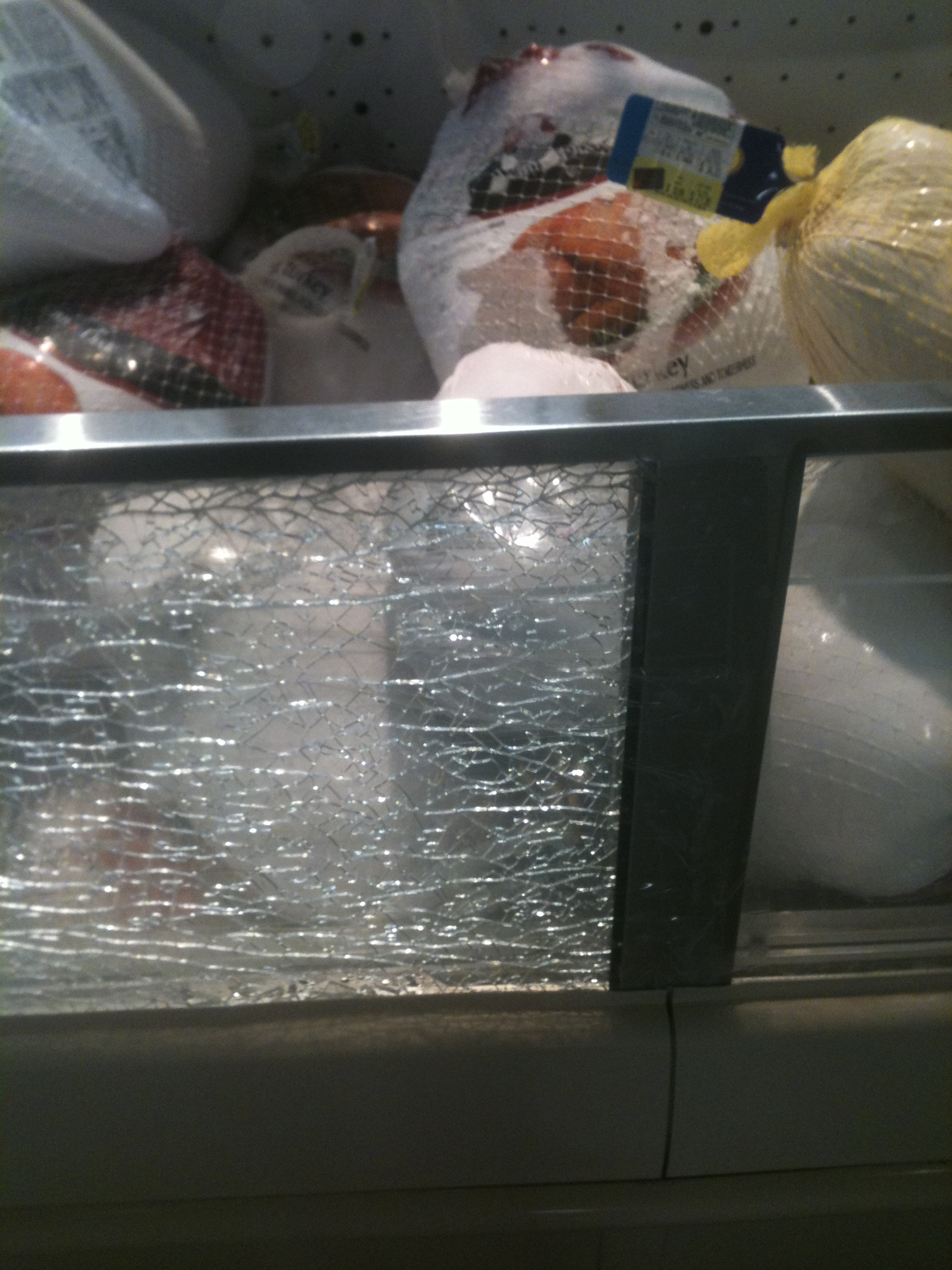
Tempered safety glass which has been laminated often does not fall out of its frame when it breaks – usually because an anti-splinter film has been applied on the glass, as seen in this grocery store meat case.

Tempered glass can be made from annealed glass via a thermal tempering process. The glass is placed onto a roller table, taking it through a furnace that heats it well above its glass transition temperature of 564 °C (1,047 °F) to around 620 °C (1,148 °F). The glass is then rapidly cooled with forced air drafts while the inner portion remains free to flow for a short time.

An alternative chemical toughening process involves forcing a surface layer of glass at least 0.1 mm thick into compression by ion exchange of the sodium ions in the glass surface with potassium ions (which are 30% larger), by immersion of the glass into a bath of molten potassium nitrate. Chemical toughening results in increased toughness compared with thermal tempering and can be applied to glass objects of complex shapes.

== Disadvantages ==
Tempered glass must be cut to size or pressed to shape before tempering, and cannot be re-worked once tempered. Polishing the edges or drilling holes in the glass is carried out before the tempering process starts. Because of the balanced stresses in the glass, damage to any portion will eventually result in the glass shattering into thumbnail-sized pieces. The glass is most susceptible to breakage due to damage at its edge, where the tensile stress is the greatest, but can also shatter in the event of a hard impact in the middle of the glass pane or if the impact is concentrated (for example, the glass is struck with a hardened point).

Using tempered glass can pose a security risk in some situations because of the tendency of the glass to shatter completely upon hard impact rather than leaving shards in the window frame.

The surface of tempered glass does exhibit surface waves caused by contact with flattening rollers, if it has been formed using this process. This waviness is a significant problem in manufacturing of thin film solar cells. The float glass process can be used to provide low-distortion sheets with very flat and parallel surfaces as an alternative for different glazing applications.

=== Spontaneous glass breakage ===
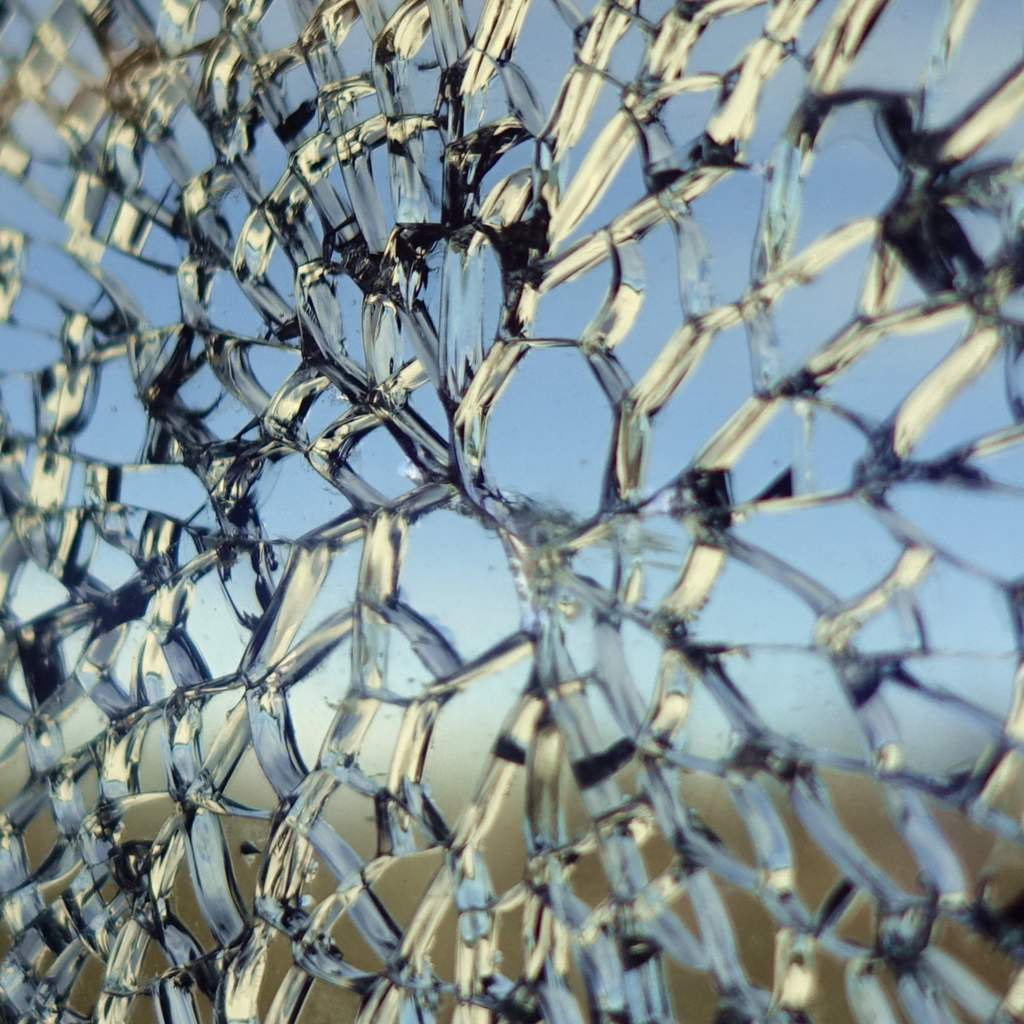
Characteristic figure-eight fracture pattern (centre of image) caused by a nickel sulfide inclusion in tempered glass

Spontaneous glass breakage is a phenomenon by which tempered glass may spontaneously break without any apparent reason. The most common causes are:

- Internal defects within the glass such as nickel sulfide inclusions. Nickel sulfide defects can cause spontaneous breakage of tempered glass years after its manufacturing. Nickel sulfide inclusions ("stones") can be present in the glass. The most common cause of these inclusions is the use of stainless-steel machinery in the glassmaking and handling process. Small shavings of stainless steel containing nickel change structure over time and grow, creating internal stresses in the glass. When these stresses exceed the strength of the glass, breakage results. This type of breakage is almost always found in tempered glass and is indicated by a distinctive "figure eight" pattern, with each "loop" of the figure eight approximately 30 mm in diameter. Alternatively, small pieces of refractory brick can be eroded by the molten glass from the internal walls of the furnace during processing and become embedded in the finished glass. These are also known as "stones", and can also break the glass when the glass is heated, as they create thermal anomalies.
- Minor damage during installation such as nicked or chipped edges later developing into larger breaks normally radiating from point of defect. While glass is being moved and installed, it is easy for the glaziers to nick or chip the edges of the glass with various tools. It is also possible for fasteners such as nails or screws used to attach glass stops to nick the glass edges if these fasteners are installed at an improper angle. These small nicks or chips may not result in immediate breakage. However, over time, as the glass expands and contracts, stress concentrations can develop around the nick, leading to breakage. In the case of tempered glass the entire unit usually breaks.
- Binding of the glass in the frame, causing stresses to develop as the glass expands and contracts due to thermal changes or deflects due to wind. Glass expands and contracts with changes in temperature and deflects due to wind, so almost all modern glass is set on resilient blocks at the bottom and with space for expansion at the sides and top. The gaskets holding the glass in the frame are also usually resilient to cushion the glass against wind buffeting. If no space is provided at the perimeter of the unit, the glass will bind against the frame, causing internal stresses to develop in the glass which can exceed the strength of glass, resulting in breakage.
- Thermal stresses in the glass. Breakage due to thermal stress is most common in large pieces of sealed insulating glass with heavy heat-absorbing (reflective) coatings. The coating is usually applied to the "number two" surface (the inside face of the outside lite). This causes the outside lite of glass to heat up more than the inside lite as the coating converts radiant heat from the Sun into sensible heat. As the outer lite expands due to heating, the entire unit bends outward. If the spacer bar or other edge condition connects the two lites of glass in a very rigid manner, bending stresses can develop which exceed the strength of the glass, causing breakage. This was the cause of extensive glass breakage at the John Hancock Tower in Boston.
- Inadequate glass thickness to resist wind load. A pane that is too large or thin, having not been properly engineered for wind loads on the site, can be broken by the wind. See Bernoulli's principle on wind.

Any breakage problem has more severe consequences where the glass is installed overhead or in public areas (such as in high-rise buildings). A safety window film can be applied to the tempered panes of glass to protect from its falling. An old-fashioned precaution was to install metal screens below skylights.

== History ==
François Barthélémy Alfred Royer de la Bastie (1830–1901) of Paris, France is credited with first developing a method of tempering glass by quenching almost molten glass in a heated bath of oil or grease in 1874, the method patented in England on August 12, 1874, patent number 2783. Tempered glass is sometimes known as Bastie glass after de la Bastie. In 1877 the German Friedrich Siemens developed a different process, sometimes called compressed glass or Siemens glass, producing a tempered glass stronger than the Bastie process by pressing the glass in cool molds. The first patent on a whole process to make tempered glass was held by chemist Rudolph A. Seiden who was born in 1900 in Austria and emigrated to the United States in 1935.

Though the underlying mechanism was not known at the time, the effects of "tempering" glass have been known for centuries. In about 1660, Prince Rupert of the Rhine brought the discovery of what are now known as "Prince Rupert's Drops" to the attention of King Charles II. These are teardrop-shaped bits of glass which are produced by allowing a molten drop of glass to fall into a bucket of water, thereby rapidly cooling it. They can withstand a blow from a hammer on the bulbous end without breaking, but the drops will disintegrate explosively into powder if the tail end is even slightly damaged.

== See also ==
- Thermal stress
- Borosilicate glass
- Fire glass
- Superglass
- Low-iron glass
- Stained glass
- Lead glass
- Pressed glass
- Superfest (a chemically hardened glass also known as CV-Glas and Ceverit)
