= Fire glass =

Tempered glass used decoratively on fireplaces

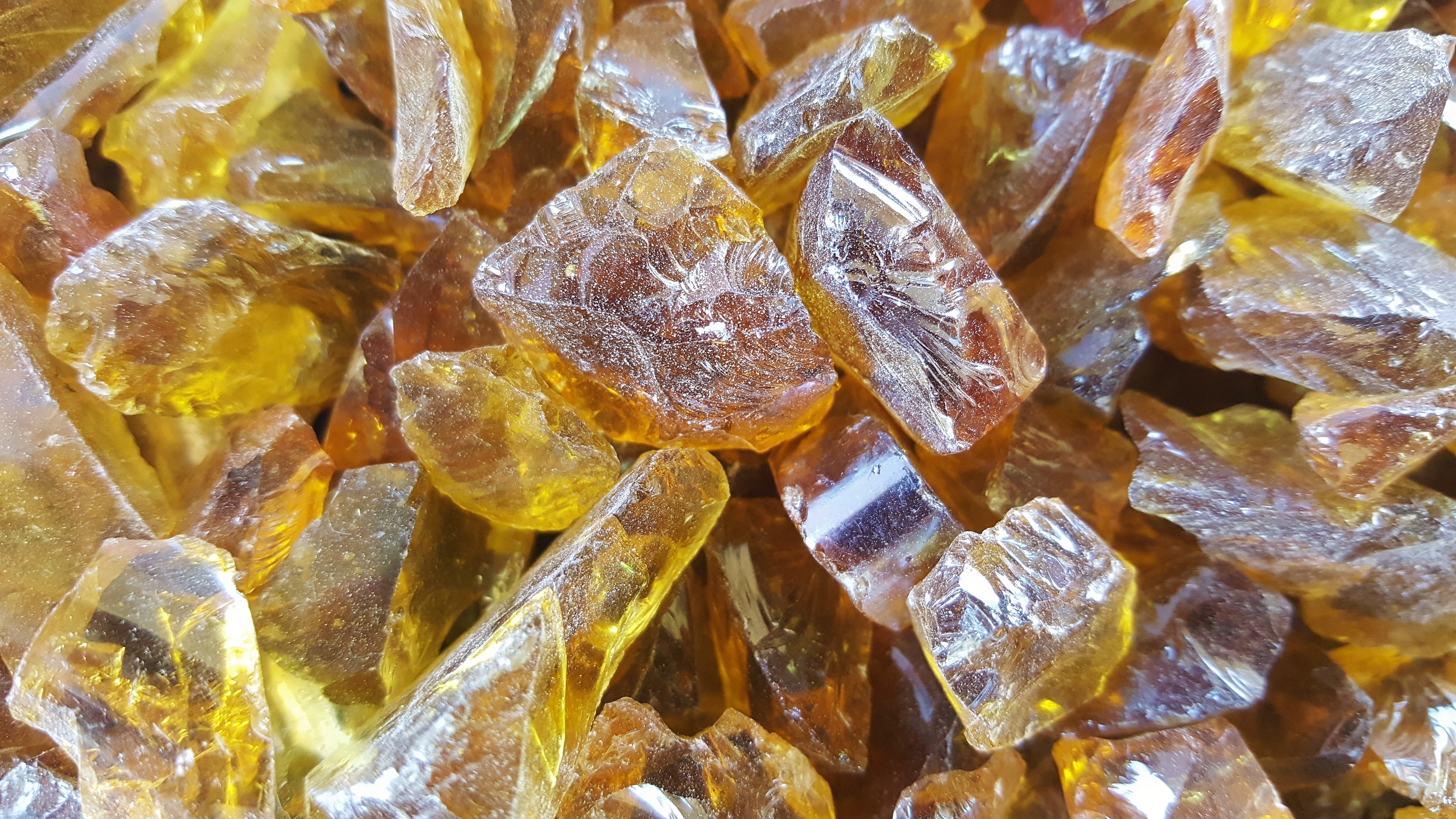
Yellow fire glass

Fire glass (also fire pit glass, fire rocks, fire beads or lava glass) is a type of tempered glass, chunks of which are used decoratively on fireplaces. Pieces of the glass are heaped around jets of burning gas, or around liquid ethanol, in order to conceal the jets and reflect the flames. It is an alternative to ceramic and stone decorative elements, such as ceramic logs and pumice ("lava rock").

== Manufacturing processes ==
Fire glass is sold in a wide range of colors. It may be made in different shapes, such as beads, diamonds, cubes or rounded pebbles. The sizes range from approximately 1/4 to 1 inch (6 to 25 mm), and is made in various different colors, sometimes with reflective coatings.

The first fire glass to be sold in the U.S. market, around 2006, was shattered in form. This is the most popular fire glass and is typically reflective glass on one side and colored on the other. The reflective coating gives a shimmering effect when in use. The shattered or broken tempered glass is the most popular form of fire glass used by consumers.

Broken standard sheets of tempered glass are typically sifted to remove any sandy, small, or very sharp pieces of glass, while the rest may optionally be lightly tumbled to remove the sharp edges. Local outdoor living companies or online retailers will often obtain broken tempered glass from local glass companies, then shatter, sift, clean and package the glass to sell to consumers. U.S. companies will also import fire glass from China by the container, as it is not made in the U.S. in bulk.

== Usage ==
The glass itself is unchanged by the fire, but accumulates dust and black soot produced by the burning hydrocarbons. Being glass, it can be cleaned with vinegar and water. Lighting the flames while there is any water on the glass can lead to uneven heating and cause the fire glass to shatter explosively. Gloves should be worn when handling glass, and any broken pieces sifted out and recycled.

One unique property of using fire glass in a fireplace compared to using ceramic logs or other materials is that it can provide a wide range of color options available. Fire Glass also has various sizes for use in the fireplace. This has become a popular choice for fire places and fire pits as well as other home improvement projects.

== See also ==
- Fireplace
- Ethanol fireplace
