= Nickel sulfide =

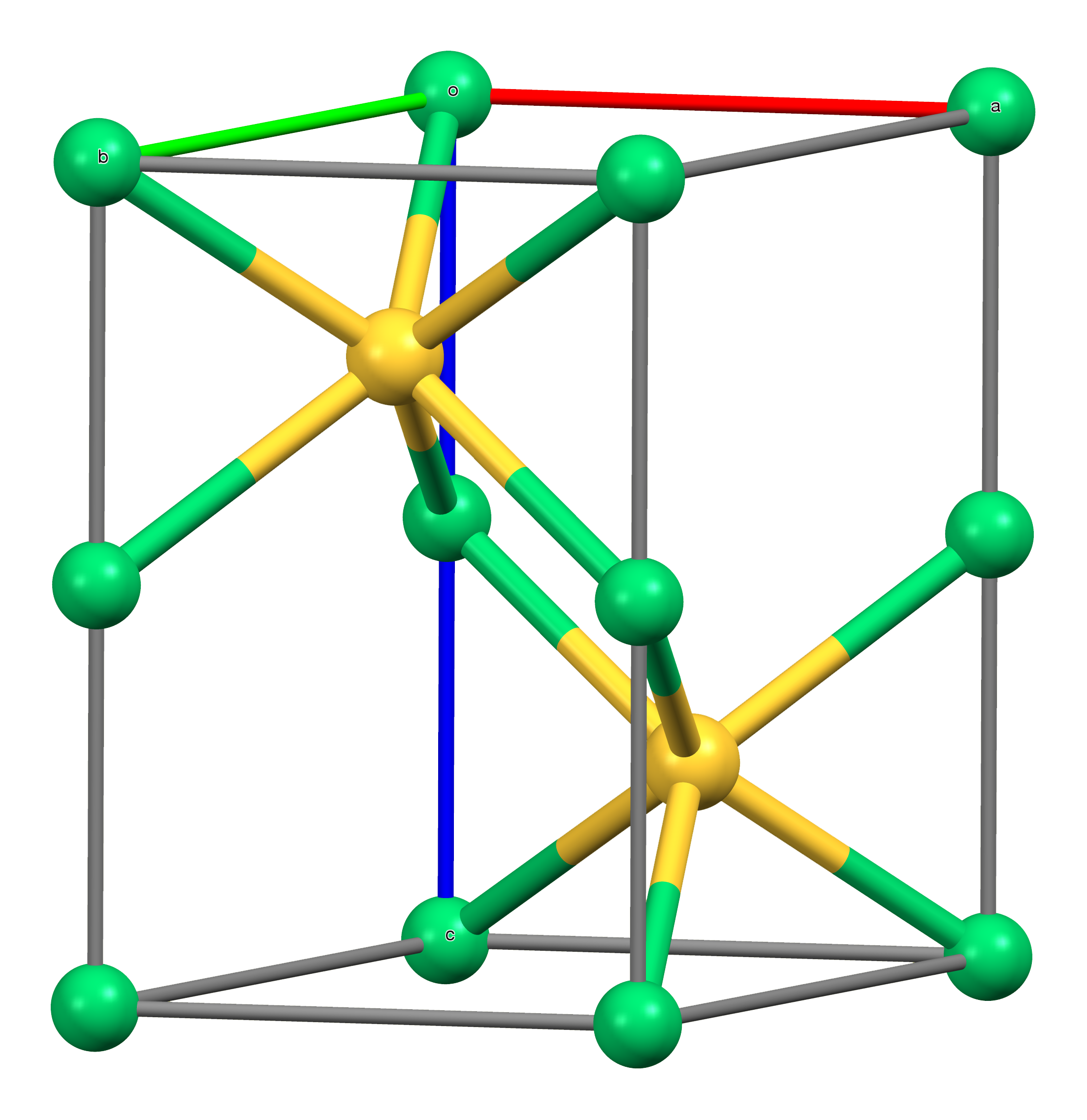

Names
- IUPAC name Nickel(II) sulfide
- Other names: Nickel sulfide; Nickel monosulfide; Nickelous sulfide

Identifiers
CAS Number	11113-75-0
3D model (JSmol)	Interactive image; Interactive image
ChemSpider	26134
ECHA InfoCard	100.037.113
EC Number	234-349-7
PubChem CID	28094
RTECS number	QR9705000
UNII	I6929D52YQ
CompTox Dashboard (EPA)	DTXSID801316876 DTXSID5036921, DTXSID801316876
- InChI: InChI=1S/Ni.S Key: WWNBZGLDODTKEM-UHFFFAOYSA-N
- SMILES: [Ni]=S; [Ni+2].[S-2]

Properties
Chemical formula	NiS
Molar mass	90.7584 g mol^{−1}
Appearance	black solid
Odor	Odorless
Density	5.87 g/cm^{3}
Melting point	797 °C (1,467 °F; 1,070 K)
Boiling point	1,388 °C (2,530 °F; 1,661 K)
Solubility in water	insoluble
Solubility	degraded by nitric acid
Magnetic susceptibility (χ)	+190.0·10^{−6} cm^{3}/mol

Structure
Crystal structure	hexagonal

Hazards
- Occupational safety and health (OHS/OSH)
Main hazards	may cause cancer by inhalation
- GHS labelling
Pictograms	(GHS07: Exclamation mark) (GHS08: Health hazard) (GHS09: Environmental hazard)
Signal word	Danger
Hazard statements	H317, H350, H372, H410
Precautionary statements	P203, P260, P264, P270, P272, P273, P280, P302+P352, P318, P319, P321, P333+P317, P362+P364, P391, P405, P501
- Except where otherwise noted, data are given for materials in their standard state (at 25 °C [77 °F], 100 kPa). verify (what is ?) Infobox references

Nickel sulfide is any inorganic compound with the formula Ni_{x}S_{y}. These compounds range in color from bronze (Ni_{3}S_{2}) to black (NiS_{2}). The nickel sulfide with simplest stoichiometry is NiS, also known as the mineral millerite. From the economic perspective, Ni_{9}S_{8}, the mineral pentlandite, is the chief source of mined nickel. Other minerals include heazlewoodite (Ni_{3}S_{2}), polydymite (Ni_{3}S_{4}), and vaesite (NiS_{2}). Some nickel sulfides are used commercially as catalysts.

== Structure ==
=== Nickel(II) sulfide ===
Like many related materials, nickel(II) sulfide, NiS, adopts the nickel arsenide motif. In this structure, nickel is octahedral and the sulfide centers are in trigonal prismatic sites.

Coordination environments in nickel sulfide
Nickel	Sulfur
octahedral	trigonal prismatic

NiS has two polymorphs. The α-phase has a hexagonal unit cell, while the β-phase has a rhombohedral cell. The α-phase is stable at temperatures above 379 °C (714 °F), and converts into the β-phase at lower temperatures. That phase transition causes an increase in volume by 2–4%.

== Synthesis and reactions ==
The precipitation of solid black nickel sulfide is a mainstay of traditional qualitative inorganic analysis schemes, which begins with the separation of metals on the basis of the solubility of their sulfides. Such reactions are written:

Ni^{2+} + H_{2}S → NiS + 2 H^{+}

Many other more controlled methods have been developed, including solid state metathesis reactions (from NiCl_{2} and Na_{2}S) and high temperature reactions of the elements.

The most commonly practiced reaction of nickel sulfides involves conversion to nickel oxides. This conversion involves heating the sulfide ores in air:

NiS + 1.5 O_{2} → NiO + SO_{2}

== Occurrence ==
=== Natural ===
The mineral millerite is also a nickel sulfide with the molecular formula NiS, although its structure differs from synthetic stoichiometric NiS due to the conditions under which it forms. It occurs naturally in low temperature hydrothermal systems, in cavities of carbonate rocks, and as a byproduct of other nickel minerals.

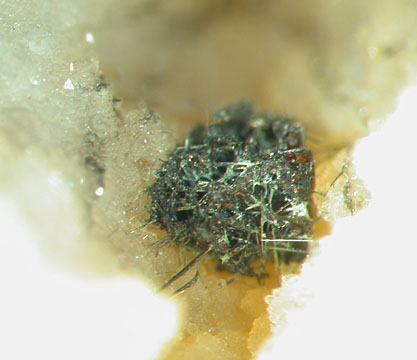
Millerite crystals

In nature, nickel sulfides commonly occur as solid solutions with iron sulfides in minerals such as pentlandite and pyrrhotite. These minerals have the formula Fe_{9−x}Ni_{x}S_{8} and Fe_{7−x}Ni_{x}S_{6}, respectively. In some cases they are high in nickel (larger values of x).

=== In glass manufacturing ===
Float glass contains a small amount of nickel sulfide, formed from the sulfur in the fining agent Na_{2}SO_{4} and the nickel contained in metallic alloy contaminants.

Nickel sulfide inclusions are a problem for tempered glass applications. After the tempering process, nickel sulfide inclusions are in the metastable alpha phase. The inclusions eventually convert to the beta phase (stable at low temperature), increasing in volume and causing cracks in the glass. In the middle of tempered glass, the material is under tension, which causes the cracks to propagate and leads to spontaneous glass fracture. That spontaneous fracture occurs years or decades after glass manufacturing.
