= 2007 Brooklyn tornado =

EF2 tornado in New York City

Coordinates: 40.63°N 74.10°W

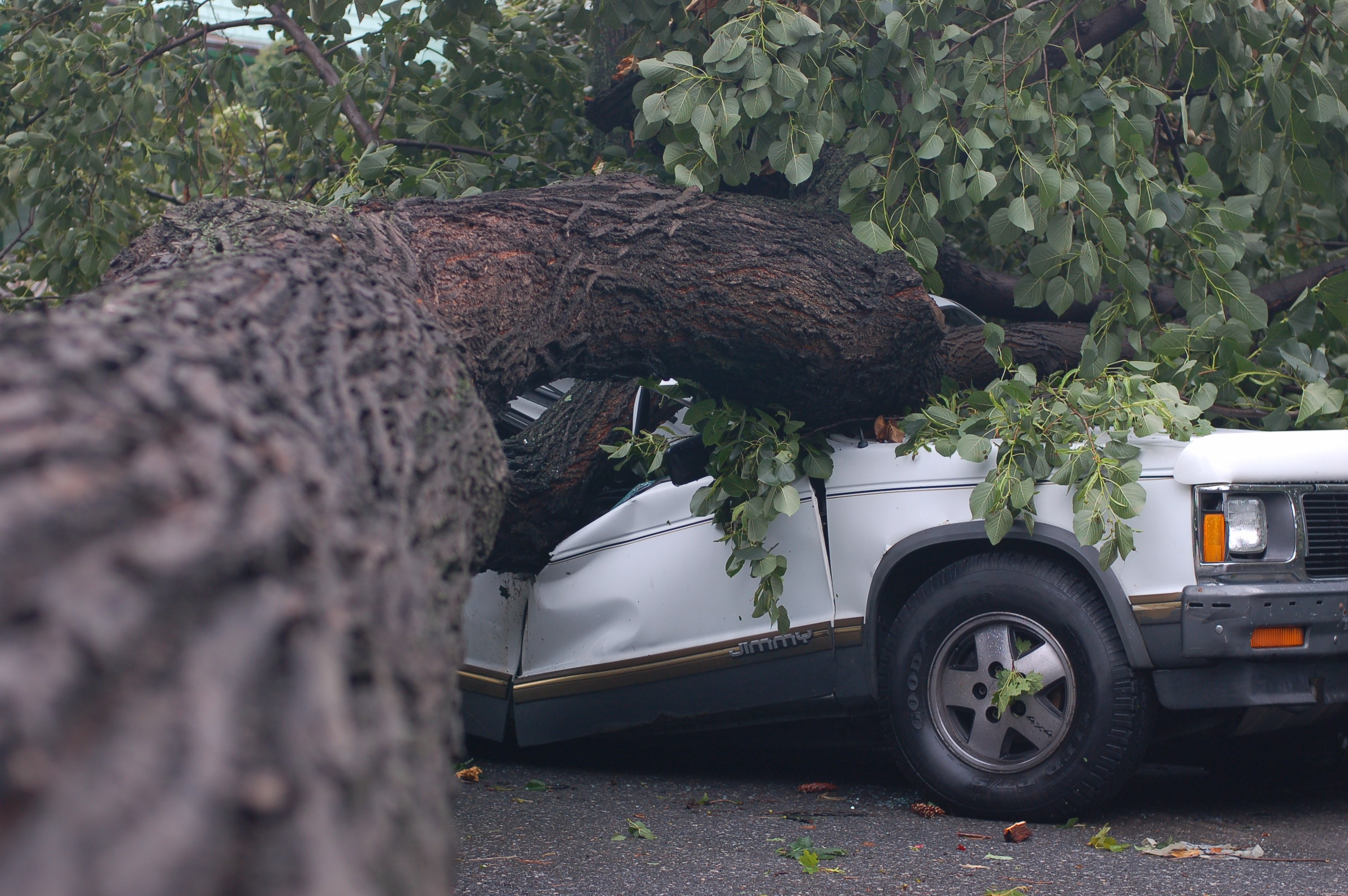
- A vehicle crushed by a fallen tree

Meteorological history
- Date: August 8, 2007
- Formed: August 8, 2007, 6:22 p.m. CDT (UTC−05:00)
- Dissipated: August 8, 2007, 6:40 p.m. CDT (UTC−05:00)
- Duration: 18 minutes

EF2 tornado
- on the Enhanced Fujita scale
- Highest winds: 111–135 mph (179–217 km/h)

Overall effects
- Injuries: 9
- Damage: US$20 million (early est.)
- Areas affected: New York City
- Power outages: >4,000
- Part of the tornadoes of 2007

The 2007 Brooklyn tornado, an EF2 tornado, was the strongest tornado on record to strike New York City since documentation began in 1950. It formed in the early morning hours of August 8, 2007, skipping along an approximately 9 miles (14 km)-long path, from Staten Island across The Narrows to Brooklyn. The worst damage was in and around Sunset Park and Bay Ridge, in Brooklyn. The U.S. National Weather Service estimated its strength there as an EF2 on the Enhanced Fujita scale.

No serious injuries or fatalities were reported as a result of the tornado, but several people were treated at area hospitals for flying glass injuries. At least 40 buildings and 100 cars were damaged. New York State Senator Martin Golden’s office estimated damage in the tens of millions of U.S. dollars.

The storm system produced severe street flooding, and disrupted all modes of transportation throughout the city. Service was delayed or suspended on all 24 New York City Subway services during the morning rush hour, and nine services were still not running by the evening rush.

== Timeline ==
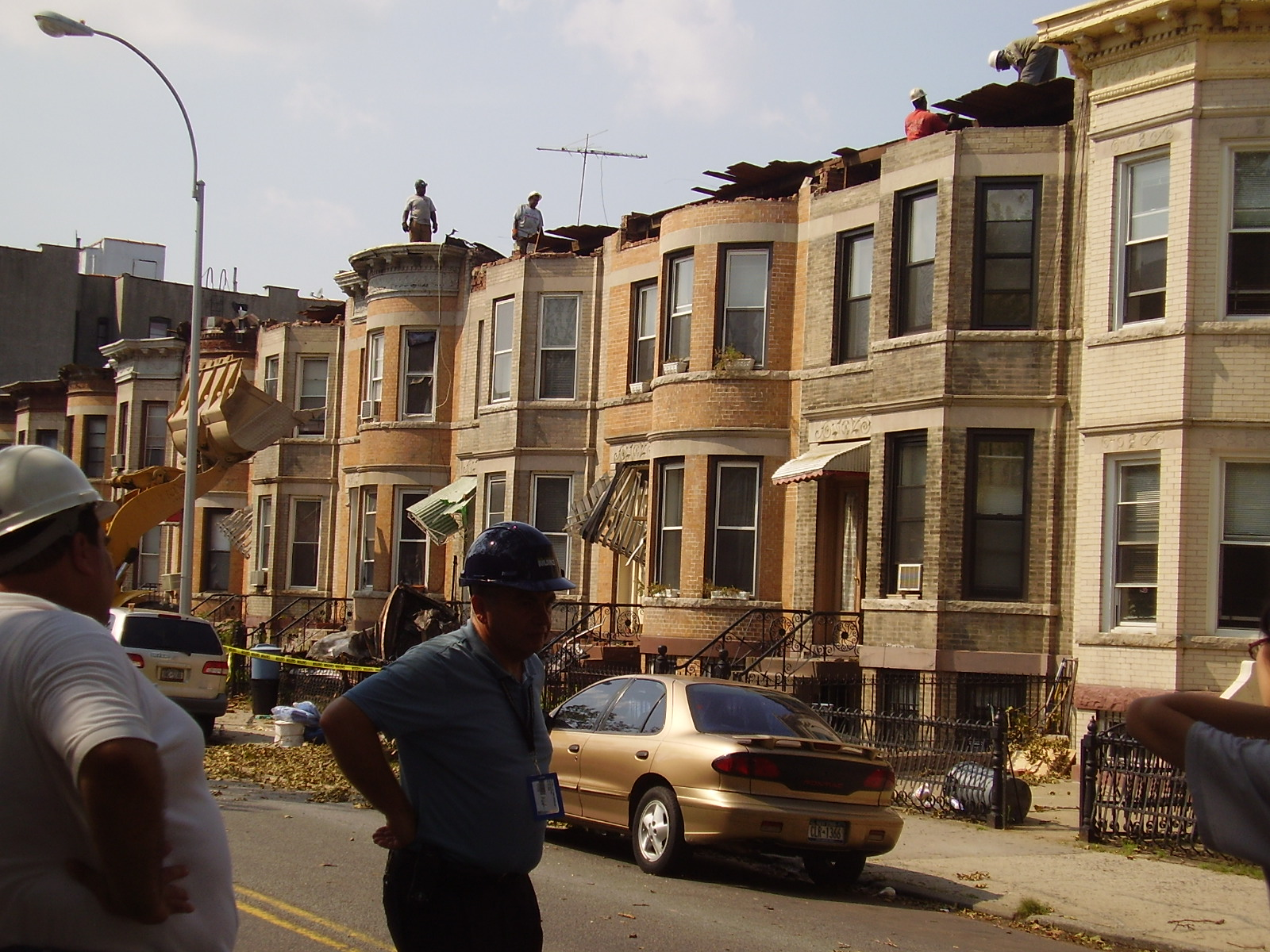
Structural damage caused by the tornado.

The typical summer storm system that spawned the tornado gathered strength over Pennsylvania, caused heavy rain over New Jersey and continued its eastward movement, reaching New York City at sunrise.

According to the National Weather Service, the first tornado first touched down in Staten Island at approximately 6:22 am EDT (1022 UTC) in the vicinity of St. Austins Place in the Livingston - Randall Manor area, before moving east, with additional damage occurring in the Tompkinsville area, probably from a subsequent tornado that formed from a new area of circulation just north of the first tornado. Most of the damage on Staten Island was to trees, and was rated EF1 intensity with estimated winds of 86–110 miles per hour (138–177 km/h).

The circulation intensified, and headed east across The Narrows tidal strait, just north of the Verrazzano–Narrows Bridge, and the tornado re-developed and touched down again in Brooklyn, at Bay Ridge at 6:32 am EDT. It continued on an east-northeast path across 68th Street between Third and Fourth Avenues, damaging the roofs of 11 homes. The storm continued to move east-northeast into Leif Ericson Park Square, where severe damage to trees occurred, and where winds blew out a 15-foot-tall (4.6 m) stained glass window valued at $300,000 at the nearby Fourth Avenue Presbyterian Church. It then crossed the Brooklyn Queens Expressway. The tornado touched down farther northeast with scattered tree damage along Sixth Avenue. Based on the assessed damage this stage of the tornado was classified EF2 with wind speeds of 111 to 135 mph (179 to 217 km/h).

The tornado returned to the ground with another pocket of significant damage on 58th Street between Sixth and Seventh Avenues. Roofs were ripped off 5 homes, with tree damage indicating strong EF1 damage. The tornado then headed east and touched down again in Kensington and the Flatbush neighborhood of Prospect Park South at approximately 6:40 am EDT. Approximately 30 trees were uprooted along Ocean Parkway.

The National Weather Service had issued a tornado warning for portions of Staten Island and Brooklyn at 6:28 am. Tornado warnings were also briefly issued for eastern Brooklyn and Southern Queens and Nassau County on Long Island, but no tornadoes were reported in those areas.

== Media coverage ==
New York Post front page on August 9

New York Daily News front page on August 9

New York media coverage of the event focused on the novelty of the event and its disruption of subway service (this was the third time in 2007 when heavy rain had caused disruptions in subway service).

=== Tabloids ===
The New York Post and New York Daily News tabloids both ran the front-page headline “Twister!”

The main article in the Daily News was headlined “Brooklyn becomes Tornado Alley!” with a subheading of “First twister to rip through boro since 1889; S.I. driver dies”.

The main article inside the Post read: “Brooklyn Cyclone” (playing on the pun of the famous Coney Island Cyclone in Brooklyn and the baseball team of the same name). The teaser on the front page depicted Dorothy Gale from The Wonderful Wizard of Oz proclaiming “This ain't Kansas”. An inside side bar in the Post had eyewitness accounts headlined “Wet & Wild”.

The Long Island based Newsday front-page headline was "What’s Up With the Weather? – LI Drenched Again – Tornado in City – Subways Swamped."

=== Broadsheets ===
The New York Times front page main headline was “Subways to Rooftops, a Storm Brings Havoc to New York” The three front-page stories were headlined “Transportation Paralysis”, "Déjà vu Down Under", "Yes a Tornado in Brooklyn."

The New York Times quoted an eyewitness, who said, "It was a funnel shape...It looked kind of black and blue...it was way up high and came right down on the roof of (a department store)...Pieces of the roof were all over the place. It was a big bang."

The New York Sun read: “It’s Frustrating, It’s Insanity” with a subhead “Anger Erupts At Subway; Tornado Hits”.

=== Global warming ===
The press coverage also examined the link between the storm and global warming, given the tornado's historic nature, and the other recent subway service interruptions caused by torrential rain on July 18 and the previous winter. Official statements alluded to this as well. "We may be dealing with meteorological conditions that are unprecedented," said Metropolitan Transportation Authority Executive Director Elliot G. Sander in the immediate aftermath, and New York Governor Eliot Spitzer said the day after, "This is supposed to be a rainfall event that is a once-in-a-decade occurrence – we've had three in the past seven months." Climate scientist James E. Hansen of the NASA Goddard Institute for Space Studies at Columbia University in New York City cautioned against linking any single event with global warming, but did say that the probability of severe weather events is related. "You cannot blame a single specific event, such as this week's storm, on climate change. However, it is fair to ask whether the human changes have altered the likelihood of such events. There the answer seems to be 'yes.'", he was quoted as saying.

== See also ==
=== Other tornadoes ===
There were five previous tornadoes in New York City on record, but none as strong as this one. The New York City borough of Staten Island has had the most tornadoes on record of any of the five boroughs, with a total of three, all since 1990. Meteorologists believed this storm produced the first tornado in Brooklyn since 1889, before reliable records were kept. The five previous tornadoes on record are:

- October 27, 2003 — An F0 tornado touches down briefly in Staten Island
- October 28, 1995 — An F1 tornado touches down in Staten Island with light damage
- August 10, 1990 — An F0 tornado on Staten Island injures three people
- October 5, 1985 — An F1 tornado in Fresh Meadows Park, Queens injures six people.
- September 2, 1974 — An F1 tornado moved from Westchester into the Bronx

=== Other links ===
- List of North American tornadoes and tornado outbreaks
- List of tornadoes striking downtown areas
- Tornadoes of 2007
