= Ethanol fireplace =

Type of chemical fire

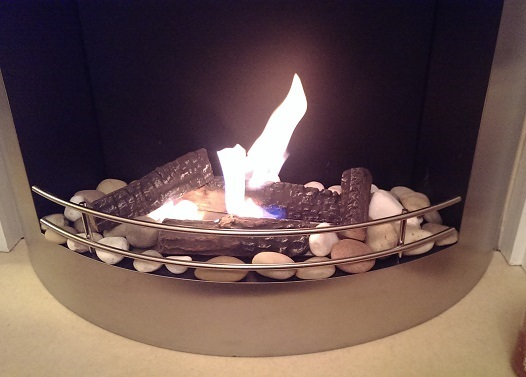
A bio-ethanol fireplace with artificial wood logs

An ethanol fireplace (also bio-ethanol fireplace, bio fireplace), is a type of fireplace which burns ethanol fuel. They are often installed without a chimney. Ethanol for these fires is often marketed as bioethanol (ethanol produced from biomass).

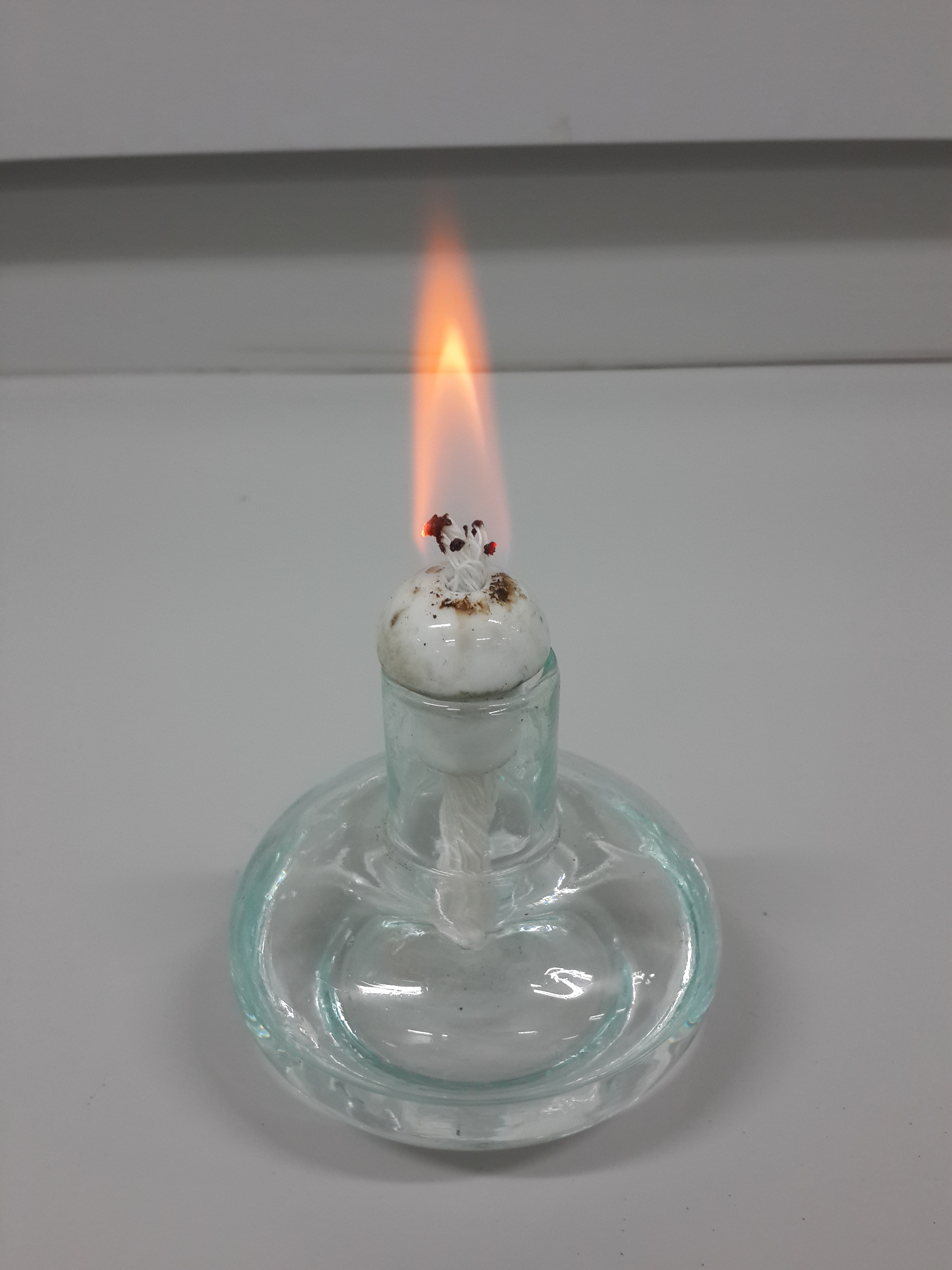
A simple glass ethanol burner or spirit lamp

The main part of the fireplace is the burner. The burner is a container filled with fuel. Ethanol fireplaces should be operated with care, since ethanol is highly flammable, and severe burn accidents can happen, mostly while refilling or lighting the fireplace, even when safety instructions are followed.

Emissions from ethanol fireplaces include carbon dioxide and nitrogen dioxide, volatile organic compounds, and particulate emissions, which are released into the room. Ethanol fireplaces are a source of fine and ultrafine particles and have a considerable influence on the quality of the indoor air; ventilation reduces the effect. Ethanol may also generate odors.

== Types ==
Ethanol fireplaces are available in several different designs. There are manual ethanol fireplaces and automatic ethanol fireplaces. Automatic ethanol fireplace flames have no direct user contact with fuel. Fuel is stored in a reservoir and then heated until the alcohol evaporates into the burner. These vapors are then ignited by a spark system in the unit. The user can turn the flames on or off as well as regulate the flame size with a remote control, mobile app or smart home system. A microprocessor controls the burning process, using numerous sensors to keep burning parameters stable. If the sensors detect any issues — such as an earth quake, low oxygen or excessively high temperatures — they will extinguish the flame. Wall mounted designs can be built into a drywall wall or be recessed into the wall. Free standing or stand-alone ethanol fireplaces are portable, and can be used in any architectural setting. Table-top ethanol fireplaces are the smallest versions of ethanol fireplaces and are often used as a decoration.

== See also ==
- Biofuel
- Biogas
- Bioenergy
