= 2010 Bronx tornado =

Weather event in New York City

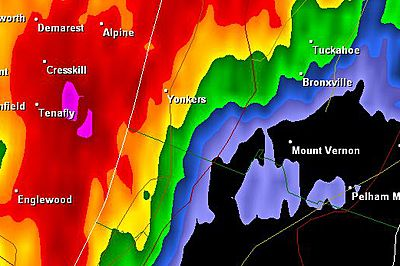
- Rain rate data from a Doppler weather radar of the storm that spawned the tornado as it moved into the Bronx

Meteorological history
- Formed: 2:55 p.m. EDT; July 25, 2010
- Dissipated: 3:00 p.m. EDT; July 25, 2010
- Duration: 5 minutes

EF1 tornado
- on the Enhanced Fujita scale
- Highest winds: 100 mph (160 km/h)

Overall effects
- Fatalities: 1 indirect
- Injuries: 7
- Damage: $150,000 (+$46,000 non-tornadic)
- Areas affected: The Bronx, New York City, New York, United states
- Power outages: 4,700
- Part of the tornadoes of 2010

The 2010 Bronx tornado was a rare EF1 tornado that struck the Bronx in New York City, United States, on July 25, 2010, and traveled 1 mi (1.6 km). The tornado, which was the second ever tornado recorded in the Bronx, touched down around 2:55 p.m. EDT in Riverdale, located within the Bronx, causing damage to buildings, trees, cars, and power lines. Seven people were injured along its track due to broken glass. The tornado lifted around 3:00 p.m. EDT while still within the Riverdale neighborhood.

The thunderstorm that spawned the tornado caused more widespread damage, with downed trees and power lines stretching from Bergen County, New Jersey to Suffolk County, New York. Roughly 4,700 Consolidated Edison customers were left without power following the event; all of whom had their electricity restored the following morning. Since 1950, when the Storm Prediction Center began keeping reliable records of tornadoes, only six other tornadoes have affected New York City, the strongest being an EF2 tornado on August 8, 2007, in Brooklyn.

== Meteorological synopsis ==
On July 25, 2010, the Storm Prediction Center (SPC) issued a slight risk for severe thunderstorms in the Tri-State Region, with a near 2% chance of a tornado touching down within 25 mi (40 km) of a given area. An upper-level trough situated over eastern Canada tracked eastward and was accompanied by a cold front that trailed southward into the Mid-Atlantic states. Thunderstorms that began along the eastern Great Lakes, in Pennsylvania and upstate New York, moved southeastward towards the Atlantic seaboard along a low-level jet stream. The highest risk of tornadoes was in eastern Pennsylvania where low-level wind shear and high Convective available potential energy (CAPE) values were present. However, a less thermodynamic environment in southern New York led to a lower risk around New York City. Around 11:00 a.m. EDT, thunderstorms began developing along the cold front over central Pennsylvania and northern West Virginia. These storms tracked generally towards the east-southeast and were noted as having a chance to develop into bow echo, leading to a high risk of damaging winds. This prompted the SPC to issue a severe thunderstorm watch for all of southern Pennsylvania, the entire state of New Jersey and parts of northern West Virginia, Maryland, Delaware and Virginia.

Around the time the watch was issued, wind shear values began to decrease over the region; however, moderately strong winds persisted over a large area, fueling further development of thunderstorms. Ahead of these storms, surface heating from days of above-average temperatures (exceeding 90 °F (32 °C)) and a moist air mass provided significant instability, another factor favoring thunderstorm formation. Over the following hours, an isolated thunderstorm developed just outside the watch area and intensified. At 2:46 p.m. EDT, the National Weather Service (NWS) office in Upton, New York issued a severe thunderstorm warning for much of the Tri-State Region. The storm was noted as having winds in excess of 60 mph (97 km/h) as it tracked east at 30 mph (48 km/h). Beginning in Bergen County, New Jersey, a line of wind damage took shape due to the storm as it moved ever closer to New York City. The storm continued to produce damage north of the city but the core entered the Bronx just before 3:00 p.m. EDT.

At 2:55 p.m. EDT, a tornado touched down around 5901 Palisades Avenue along the east bank of the Hudson River. According to a resident who lived near where the tornado began, the funnel cloud preceding the tornado developed over the river. Tracking southeast, the tornado impacted a few structures, shattering windows and damaging roofs. The scale of damage to these structures was consistent with an EF1 tornado with winds around 100 mph (160 km/h) on the Enhanced Fujita Scale. The system continued through the Bronx for roughly five minutes before it lifted near the intersection of Riverdale Avenue and 254th Street, about 1 mi (1.6 km) from where it began. Continuing across southern New York, the thunderstorm continued to produce wind damage through Suffolk County before moving offshore around 4:05 p.m. EDT.

== Impact and aftermath ==
The thunderstorm that spawned the tornado left a trail of wind damage from northeastern New Jersey through Long Island along its nearly two-hour existence. Strong wind gusts, reaching 65 mph (105 km/h) in some areas, downed numerous trees and power lines across Bergen County. Several roads were also blocked after large trees toppled onto them. In Pedricktown, a large tree fell on a home and broke through the roof, allowing heavy rain to fall inside the structure. Similar damage took place in the Bronx where trees fell on cars, streets and power lines. Along the northern edge of the storm, strong winds in Yonkers also downed trees and power lines. In Nassau and Suffolk Counties, winds reached 60 mph (97 km/h) before the storm finally moved offshore.

The tornado itself caused relatively little damage in comparison with the thunderstorm that spawned it. Several trees were destroyed by 100 mph (160 km/h) winds produced by the system and branches were snapped and littered across streets. A few of the downed trees struck the first floor windows of buildings, shattering the glass and leaving seven people with minor injuries. One tree was uprooted and "became a projectile" and was wedged within another tree nearby. One home also sustained significant roof damage along the tornado's track. Dozens of cars were totaled by downed trees along its path and thousands were left without power. According to Consolidated Edison (ConEd), 1,700 customers in Riverdale and 3,000 in Bronxwide were without power due to the tornado. Additionally, there was also a microburst during the thunderstorm, associated with straight-line wind damage. Non-tornadic damage was estimated at $46,000. Total losses from the tornado were estimated at $150,000. Offshore, the storm left one sailing student missing after he fell overboard during a sailing lesson. Coast Guard teams continue to search for the man; however, there have been no signs of him as of July 28. The search was later called off and the sailor has been presumed dead.

Although the storm brought significant damage, rains from it also helped end a growing drought issue and a significant heat wave in the region. Prior to the storm's passage, temperatures in New Jersey had reached the mid-90s°F (mid-30s°C), but fell into the 70–79 °F (21–26 °C) range by 4:00 p.m. EDT. The heavy rains led to street flooding, creating widespread traffic jams, especially on the Henry Hudson Parkway.

Following the severe damage caused by the storm, the NWS deployed a storm survey team on July 26 to the hardest hit area to determine if a tornado had struck. Their assessment was complete the following day and it was concluded that it was in fact a tornado that caused the most significant damage. Throughout the day on July 26, ConEd deployed crews throughout the Bronx to repair broken power poles and downed lines. By the evening of July 25, only 100 of the original 4,700 customers were still without power; it was fully restored to all residents the following day. Along Palisade Avenue, nearly half a dozen companies provided assistance in tree removal with wood chippers, cherry pickers and dump trucks to clear the streets. Due to the large amount of downed wires, residents living along Ladd Road north to Sigma Place were urged to remain in their homes for their own safety until ConEd crews had cleared the area.

=== Historical perspective ===
Since the SPC began keeping records of severe weather events in 1950, few tornadoes have touched down around New York City. Prior to the 2010 Bronx tornado, the most recent to hit the area were an EF1 and EF2 on August 8, 2007, which hit Brooklyn. In the Bronx, there has been only one other tornado confirmed to have touched down, the first was recorded on September 2, 1974. Four other tornadoes have been recorded within the city, one in each 1985, 1990, 1995 and 2003, none of which exceeded F1 intensity.

== See also ==
- Tornadoes of 2010
- 2010 Brooklyn/Queens tornadoes
- 2007 Brooklyn tornadoes
- 2006 Westchester County tornado
- List of North American tornadoes and tornado outbreaks
