= Flying glass =

Pieces of broken glass that become sharp projectiles

Flying glass refers to pieces of broken glass (typically from a window) which become sharp missiles projected by the force which broke the glass, along with any strain energy due to tempering. They often cause cut-type injuries.

Flying glass resulting from an explosion poses a significant risk in the event; up to 85% of injuries from an explosion are due to flying glass. Severity of injury from flying glass depends on the peak overpressure of the blast. Potential for injury has been derived from both experiments and theoretical modeling of blast effects. Among the important features in models of flying glass are breaking pressure, velocity and distribution of flying fragments, fragment shape, and the distance traveled until impact. Mitigation strategies, such as the use of window glazing or laminated glass can reduce flying glass injuries.
