= 2010 Brooklyn–Queens tornadoes =

Occurrence of severe weather in New York City

2010 Brooklyn/Queens tornadoes
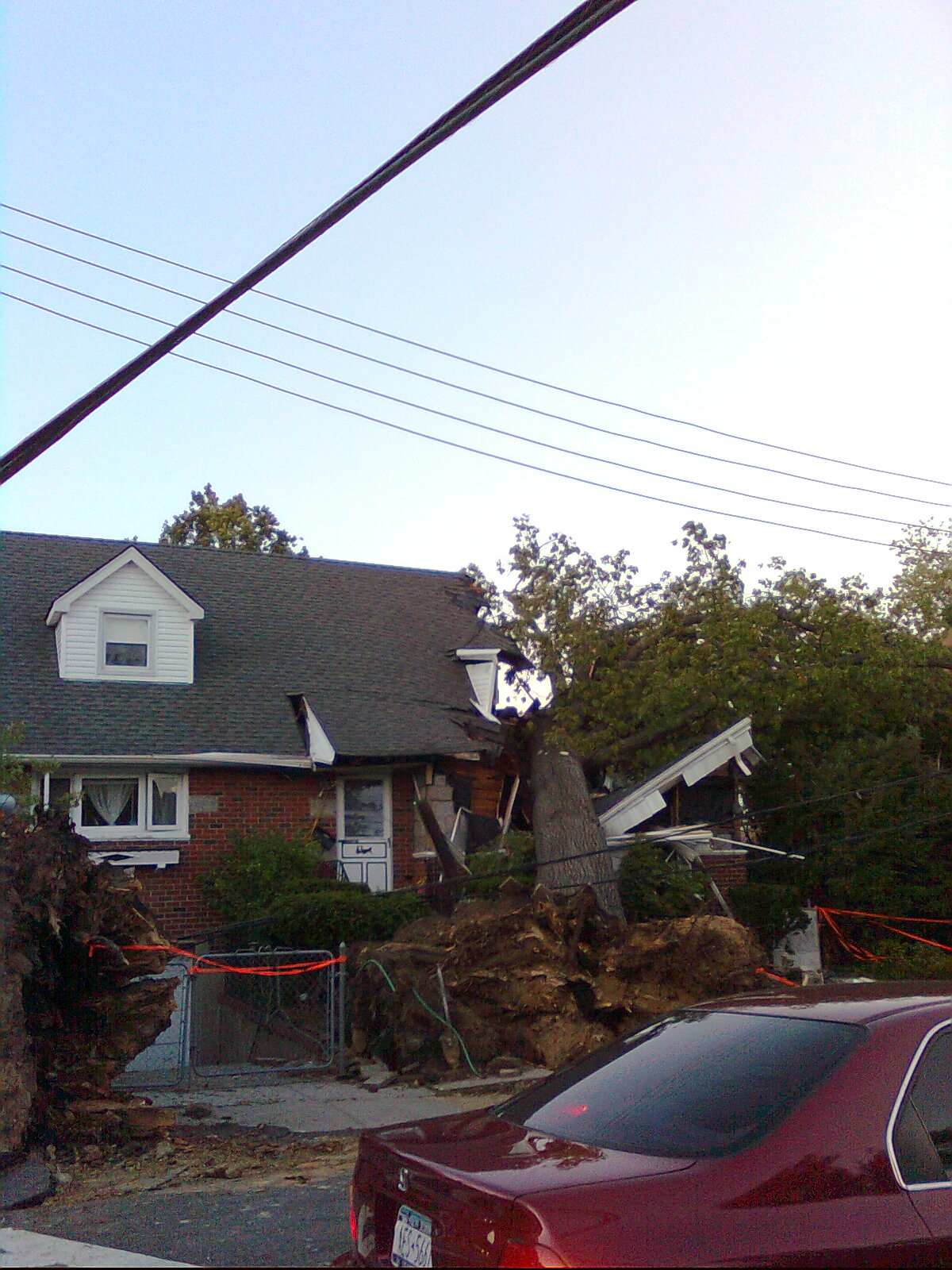
- Damage to a home in Flushing caused by a large fallen tree.

Meteorological history
- Formed: September 16, 2010, 4:38 PM EDT (UTC−05:00)
- Dissipated: September 16, 2010, 8:25 PM EDT (UTC−05:00)

Tornado outbreak
- Tornadoes: 14
- Max. rating: EF3 tornado
- Duration: 3 hours, 47 minutes

Overall effects
- Casualties: 2 fatalities (+1 non-tornadic fatality); 25 injuries
- Damage: $65.5 million (2010 USD)
- Areas affected: Park Slope, Brooklyn; Middle Village/Flushing, Queens in New York City, New York, United States
- Power outages: >30,000
- Part of the tornadoes of 2010

The 2010 Brooklyn/Queens tornadoes were a severe weather event that occurred in the boroughs of Brooklyn and Queens in New York City on September 16, 2010. These tornadoes were the second and third to touch down in New York City that year, the first having occurred in the Bronx on July 25.

== Summary ==
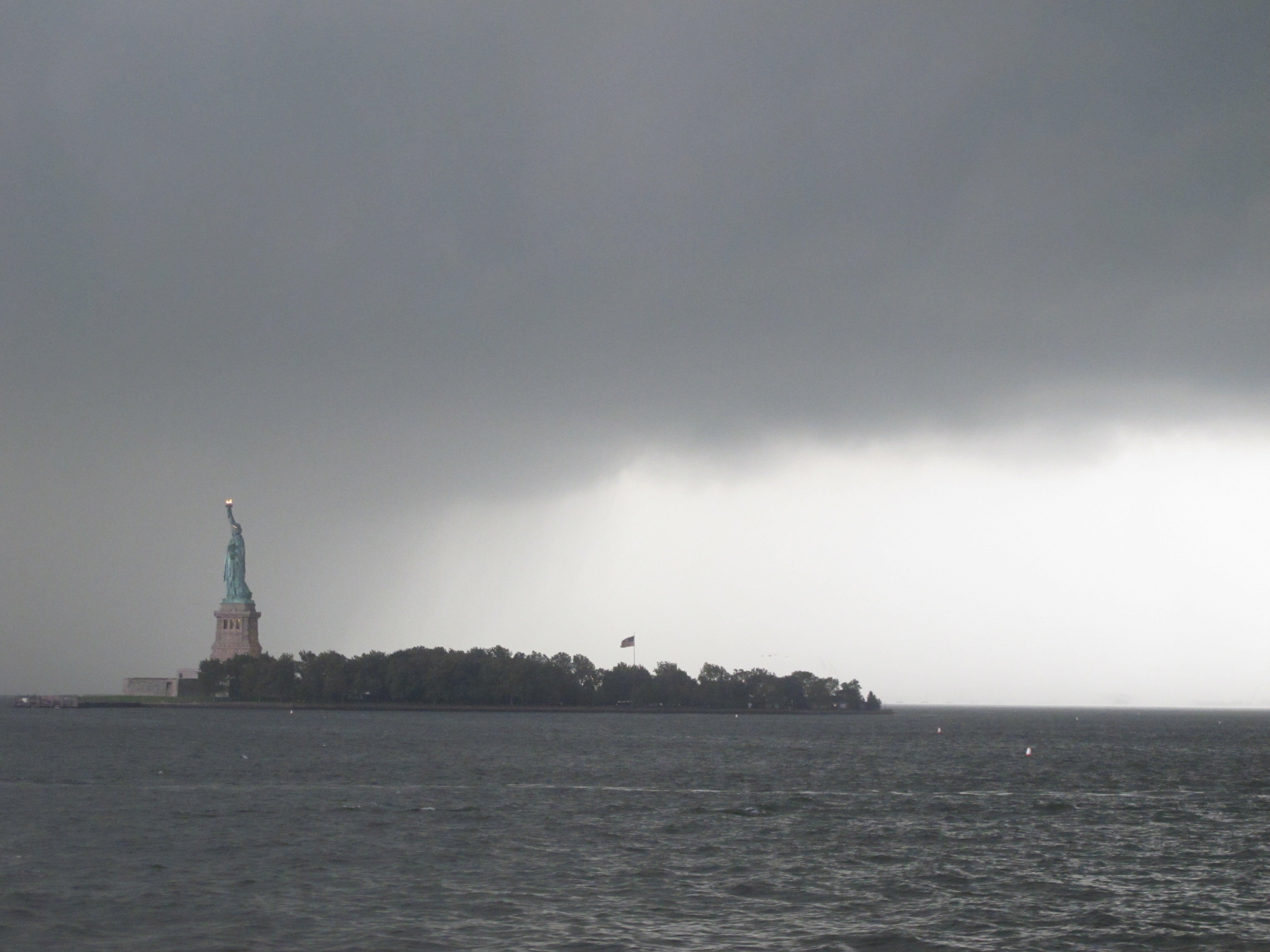
The Statue of Liberty in the September 16 storm

The storms struck New York City just as the evening rush hour was beginning. Damaging winds, heavy downpours, and hail up to 1 inch (2.5 cm) wreaked havoc with the evening commute. Hundreds of downed trees led to a temporary suspension of service on the Long Island Rail Road, Amtrak, and several New York City Subway services including the 7, L, and M, leaving tens of thousands of commuters stranded.

A woman was killed when a tree fell and crushed the vehicle she was driving. A man in Flushing was killed by a tree crashing into his home by Kissena Park. Extensive and widespread wind damage led to over 30,000 downed trees, and power lines. During the storm, winds tore trees out of the ground before blowing them up to 30–40 feet (9.1–12.2 m) away. According to Con Edison, more than 25,000 customers lost power in Queens while 5,000 were without power in Staten Island. Four buildings across Brooklyn and Queens reported experiencing a partial collapse due to tornadic winds. The worst damage was concentrated in the neighborhoods of Middle Village, Forest Hills, and Bayside in Queens as well as Park Slope and Bed-Stuy in Brooklyn. Scattered power outages were reported across parts of the city.

Two separate tornadoes were later confirmed in Park Slope and Flushing, two areas that suffered the worst damage from the storms. The stronger of the two tornadoes touched down over Flushing and was rated an EF1 with maximum winds of 100 mph. The tornado touched down in Flushing Meadows Corona Park and headed through Northeast Queens, dissipating over Little Neck Bay. The tornado tore down the 150-year-old steeple of St. George's Church in downtown Flushing. In addition to the tornadoes, the National Weather Service confirmed the occurrence of a macroburst bringing winds up to 125 miles per hour (201 km/h) to a wide swath of Middle Village and Forest Hills. In Forest Hills, a group of trees were knocked over in MacDonald park, destroying the park and surroundings. Combined, the two tornadoes caused $25.7 million in damages.

These tornadoes were part of a small outbreak that produced several damaging tornadoes across the Midwest, especially in Ohio. An EF2 tornado caused severe damage, totaling $35 million, near Wooster, Ohio. Another strong EF3 tornado that destroyed numerous homes near Reedsville, Ohio and Belleville, West Virginia killed one person and injured several more. This became the first fatal tornado in West Virginia in a decade. The stadium at Athens High School was destroyed by a tornado.

== Confirmed tornadoes ==
Confirmed tornadoes by Enhanced Fujita rating
EFU	EF0	EF1	EF2	EF3	EF4	EF5	Total
0	2	8	3	1	0	0	14

=== September 16 event ===
List of reported tornadoes - Thursday, September 16, 2010
EF#	Location	County	Coord.	Time (UTC)	Path length	Comments/Damage
Ohio
EF0	SW of Galena	Delaware	40.18°N 82.89°W	2038	0.25 miles (400 m)	Minor tree damage and a few shingles were removed from a house as a result of this brief tornado.
EF2	S of Wooster	Wayne	40.78°N 81.96°W	2126	11 miles (18 km)	Severe damage at the Ohio Agricultural Research and Development Center where greenhouses and a large brick laboratory building were destroyed and other buildings were heavily damaged. Over 150 houses and barns were also damaged, some significantly with a few destroyed. Numerous trees were snapped and uprooted and vehicles were flipped and tossed. One person was injured.
EF2	S of Somerset	Fairfield, Perry	39.81°N 82.30°W	2152	11 miles (18 km)	Two houses were destroyed and many others were damaged, some heavily. Major damage to hundreds of trees and to power lines and poles. One person was injured. Damage also occurred in West Rushville.
EF1	Tarlton	Fairfield, Pickaway	39.57°N 82.86°W	2156	2.85 miles (4.59 km)	Two grain silos were thrown and several houses were damaged. Extensive tree damage occurred along the path and a semi-trailer was pushed over.
EF1	SW of Farmerstown	Holmes	40.45°N 81.75°W	2200	3 miles (4.8 km)	A few houses were damaged and barns and outbuildings were destroyed along the path.
EF1	SW of Buena Vista	Hocking	39.53°N 82.67°W	2209	1 mile (1.6 km)	A pole barn lost its roof and a house sustained minor damage.
EF1	New Philadelphia area	Tuscarawas	40.49°N 81.53°W	2220	5 miles (8.0 km)	Several houses sustained minor damage and outbuildings were destroyed. Many trees were also uprooted.
EF1	Crooksville area	Perry, Morgan	39.77°N 82.09°W	2221	5 miles (8.0 km)	Several houses were damaged and sheds, barns and outbuildings were destroyed.
EF2	S of Nelsonville	Athens	39.39°N 82.23°W	2254	3 miles (4.8 km)	Severe damage in the area, with 13 houses and many mobile homes destroyed and dozens of other houses damaged, some heavily. Many trees were uprooted or snapped. 7 people were injured.
EF3	Reedsville area	Meigs, Wood (WV)	39.15°N 81.75°W	0000	9 miles (14 km)	1 death - Severe damage on both sides of the Ohio River. Over 50 houses were damaged or destroyed with at least 2 that were completely leveled. Numerous mobile homes and farm buildings were damaged or destroyed. Mobile home frames were found wrapped around tree stumps. Extensive tree damage occurred and vehicles were tossed and destroyed. 16 others were injured, some seriously.
New York
EF0	Park Slope	Kings	40.67°N 73.99°W	2133	2 miles (3.2 km)	Weak tornado touchdown embedded in a larger macroburst. Direct tornado damage limited to trees, some which landed on and destroyed vehicles.
EF1	Flushing	Queens	40.74°N 73.84°W	2142	4 miles (6.4 km)	1 death - Many trees were knocked down including one falling onto a car killing one person driving along Grand Central Parkway. Several houses and businesses were also damaged, and many windows were blown out. One other person was injured and one indirect death was also reported.
New Jersey
EF1	Woodruff	Ocean	40.06°N 74.49°W	2205	2.2 miles (3.5 km)	Two houses sustained major roof damage. A small barn was also destroyed and over 300 trees were blown down.
West Virginia
EF1	SE of Palestine	Wirt	39.06°N 81.34°W	0025	1 mile (1.6 km)	Significant tree damage with some falling on houses and outbuildings.
Sources: SPC Storm Reports for 09/16/10, NWS Wilmington OH, NWS Cleveland, NWS Pittsburgh, NWS Philadelphia, NWS Charleston, WV, NWS New York City (PNS), NCDC Storm Data
