= National Register of Historic Places listings in Dutchess County, New York =

Location of Dutchess County in New York

List of the National Register of Historic Places listings in Dutchess County, New York

This is intended to be a complete list of the 132 properties and districts listed on the National Register of Historic Places in Dutchess County, New York outside of Poughkeepsie and Rhinebeck. The locations of National Register properties and districts (at least for all showing latitude and longitude coordinates below) may be seen in a map by clicking on "Map of all coordinates". There are eight properties and districts which are further designated National Historic Landmarks in the county.

Locations in the city and town of Poughkeepsie are listed separately, as are the locations in the town and village of Rhinebeck.

This National Park Service list is complete through NPS recent listings posted October 16, 2026.

Contents: Counties in New York
Albany (Albany) – Allegany – Bronx – Broome – Cattaraugus – Cayuga – Chautauqua – Chemung – Chenango – Clinton – Columbia – Cortland – Delaware – Dutchess (Poughkeepsie, Rhinebeck) – Erie (Buffalo) – Essex – Franklin – Fulton – Genesee – Greene – Hamilton – Herkimer – Jefferson – Kings – Lewis – Livingston – Madison – Monroe (Rochester) – Montgomery – Nassau – New York (Below 14th Street, 14th to 59th Streets, 59th to 110th Streets, Above 110th Street, Islands) – Niagara (Niagara Falls) – Oneida – Onondaga (Syracuse) – Ontario – Orange – Orleans – Oswego – Otsego – Putnam – Queens – Rensselaer – Richmond – Rockland – St. Lawrence – Saratoga – Schenectady – Schoharie – Schuyler – Seneca – Steuben – Suffolk – Sullivan – Tioga – Tompkins – Ulster – Warren – Washington – Wayne – Westchester (Northern, Southern, New Rochelle, Peekskill, Yonkers) – Wyoming – Yates

== Current listings ==
=== Remainder of county ===
	Name on the Register	Image	Date listed	Location	City or town	Description
1	Akin Free Library	Akin Free Library	November 21, 1991 (#91001726)	97 Quaker Hill Rd. 41°33′32″N 73°32′57″W	Pawling	Eclectic Victorian building at rural crossroads housing natural history museum and library
2	Attlebury Schoolhouse	Attlebury Schoolhouse	May 16, 2016 (#16000253)	6917 NY 82; 41°55′10″N 73°40′05″W	Stanford	Wooden 1910 one-room schoolhouse is only one remaining in town in its original form
3	Bain Commercial Building	Bain Commercial Building	September 29, 1984 (#84002369)	59-61 W. Main St. 41°36′04″N 73°55′16″W	Wappingers Falls	1875 residence and store is unusual intact 19th-century commercial building on east side of Wappinger Creek in the former hamlet of Channingville.
4	Bangall Post Office	Bangall Post Office	May 19, 2014 (#14000224)	105 Hunns Lake Rd. 41°52′32″N 73°41′31″W	Bangall	Early 20th century post office at center of small hamlet designed and built by local postmaster has had a variety of other uses; still remains in postal service.
5	Bannerman's Island Arsenal	Bannerman's Island Arsenal	November 23, 1982 (#82001121)	Pollepel Island, off NY 9-D; 41°27′19″N 73°59′19″W	Fishkill	Home and warehouse of a military surplus dealer; currently owned by state but with severely restricted public access
6	Walter Beckwith House	Walter Beckwith House	May 31, 2016 (#16000306)	482 Jameson Hill Rd. 41°50′34″N 73°43′39″W	Stanford	Intact 1876 Second Empire farmhouse
7	Bard Infant School and St. James Chapel	Bard Infant School and St. James Chapel	August 19, 1993 (#93000848)	East Market St. 41°47′18″N 73°56′07″W	Hyde Park	Greek Revival school built in 1832; Gothic Revival chapel added in 1856.
8	Oliver Barrett House	Oliver Barrett House	November 22, 2000 (#00001416)	Reagan Rd. 41°54′08″N 73°31′01″W	Millerton	1853 farmhouse extensively altered in late Victorian era for Coleman Station postmaster
9	Beacon Engine Company No. 1 Firehouse	Beacon Engine Company No. 1 Firehouse	December 6, 2004 (#04001341)	57 E. Main St. 41°30′11″N 73°57′41″W	Beacon	
10	Beekman Meeting House and Friends' Cemetery	Beekman Meeting House and Friends' Cemetery	April 27, 1989 (#89000303)	Emans Rd. 41°38′00″N 73°46′02″W	LaGrangeville	Ruins of 1809 Quaker meeting house, one of only two in county to become Orthodox meetings after 1828 schism
11	Bergh–Stoutenburgh House	Bergh–Stoutenburgh House	September 27, 1972 (#72000829)	U.S. 9; 41°46′55″N 73°55′57″W	Hyde Park	One of only two remaining Dutch stone houses in Hyde Park. Until recently used as a Japanese restaurant, now district office for state senator Sue Serino
12	Beth David Synagogue	Beth David Synagogue	April 8, 2002 (#02000308)	E. Main St. 41°51′01″N 73°33′10″W	Amenia	1929 synagogue built by small local community of Russian Jewish emigrants is only one listed on east side of Hudson north of New York City
13	Bloomvale Historic District	Bloomvale Historic District	December 30, 1991 (#91001874)	Jct. of NY 82, Co. Rd. 13 and E. Branch Wappingers Cr., Pleasant Valley and Washington Townships; 41°48′01″N 73°45′24″W	Salt Point	18th-century mill community that remained productive through early 20th century
14	Bogardus-DeWindt House	Bogardus-DeWindt House	April 19, 1993 (#93000280)	16 Tompkins Ave. 41°30′37″N 73°58′46″W	Beacon	Well-preserved home of early landowner and descendants
15	Madam Catharyna Brett Homestead	Madam Catharyna Brett Homestead	December 12, 1976 (#76001212)	50 Van Nydeck Ave. 41°30′09″N 73°58′04″W	Beacon	1709 home of early settler in area is oldest home in county. Later used by Continental Army
16	Bykenhulle	Bykenhulle	December 30, 1991 (#91001872)	21 Bykenhulle Rd. 41°34′59″N 73°46′13″W	Hopewell Junction	Well-preserved 1841 Dutch farmhouse built by Peter Adriance; renamed by later owners and now a bed and breakfast
17	Dr. Cornelius Nase Campbell House	Dr. Cornelius Nase Campbell House	April 18, 2007 (#07000333)	6031 NY 82; 41°52′11″N 73°42′33″W	Stanfordville	
18	Cornelius Carman House	Cornelius Carman House	December 30, 1987 (#87001372)	River Rd. S. 41°32′59″N 73°58′14″W	Chelsea	1835 Greek Revival house
19	Chelsea Grammar School	Chelsea Grammar School	August 25, 1987 (#87001371)	Liberty St. 41°33′08″N 73°58′04″W	Chelsea	Intact 1875 brick one-room schoolhouse used today as post office and auxiliary church building
20	Ezra Clark House	Ezra Clark House	February 21, 1985 (#85000338)	Mill Rd. 41°55′15″N 73°31′05″W	Millerton	Intact 1780 brick farmhouse is second-oldest in Coleman Station
21	Clinton Corners Friends Church	Clinton Corners Friends Church	April 27, 1989 (#89000305)	Salt Point Tnpk./Main St. 41°49′54″N 73°45′41″W	Clinton Corners	
22	Coleman Station Historic District	Coleman Station Historic District	September 30, 1993 (#93000945)	Coleman Station, Indian Lake, Regan and Sheffield Hill Rds. 41°54′06″N 73°30′57″W	Millerton	Almost three square miles of rural community with buildings and lands largely intact from the 19th century. Several farms and houses separately listed.
23	Capt. Moses W. Collyer House	Capt. Moses W. Collyer House	August 25, 1987 (#87001370)	River Rd. S 41°33′05″N 73°58′15″W	Chelsea	1899 home of former riverboat captain who later coauthored Sloops of the Hudson definitive history of sailing-ship commerce on Hudson.
24	Creek Meeting House and Friends' Cemetery	Creek Meeting House and Friends' Cemetery	April 27, 1989 (#89000299)	Salt Point Tnpk./Main St. 41°49′53″N 73°45′43″W	Clinton Corners	
25	Crum Elbow Meeting House and Cemetery	Crum Elbow Meeting House and Cemetery	April 27, 1989 (#89000302)	Quaker Ln. 41°48′18″N 73°51′59″W	East Park	
26	Dakin-Coleman Farm	Dakin-Coleman Farm	November 22, 2000 (#00001421)	Coleman Station Rd. 41°54′19″N 73°31′34″W	Millerton	1773 farmhouse is oldest house in Coleman Station Historic District
27	Watts De Peyster Fireman's Hall	Watts De Peyster Fireman's Hall	November 16, 1989 (#89002005)	86 Broadway at Pine St. 42°03′32″N 73°54′43″W	Tivoli	1898 gift to village from John Watts De Peyster now used as village hall
28	Dover Stone Church	Dover Stone Church	December 2, 2014 (#14000981)	Stone Church Ln. 41°44′17″N 73°35′19″W	Dover Plains	Waterfall looking like a church window, heavily promoted by Harlem Valley Railroad as local scenic attraction
29	Peter C. DuBois House	Peter C. DuBois House	January 28, 2004 (#03001512)	36 Slocum Rd. 41°29′01″N 73°58′25″W	Beacon	One of the last significant Greek Revival home to be built in the Hudson Valley. Later expanded and used as part of a sanitarium.
30	Dutchess Company Superintendent's House	Dutchess Company Superintendent's House	September 29, 1984 (#84002371)	120 Market St. 41°35′39″N 73°55′35″W	Wappingers Falls	Company-owned 1848 home of foreman of local printing company, village's major employer in 19th century
31	Dutchess Manor	Dutchess Manor	November 23, 1982 (#82001131)	400 Breakneck Rd. 41°27′37″N 73°58′56″W	Fishkill	1889 home of Francis Timoney, Irish immigrant who grew wealthy making brick, including that used to build the house, from local clay. Today a popular local banquet hall and restaurant.
32	Elmendorph Inn	Elmendorph Inn	September 20, 1978 (#78001850)	43-45 N. Broadway; 41°59′50″N 73°52′27″W	Red Hook	1750s house is oldest building in Red Hook; now a community center
33	Eustatia	Eustatia	February 26, 1979 (#79001576)	12 Monell Pl. 41°30′49″N 73°58′59″W	Beacon	1867 Frederick Clarke Withers design is a rare Victorian Gothic cottage done in brick
34	Fishkill Supply Depot Site	Fishkill Supply Depot Site	January 21, 1974 (#74001230)	Bisected by US 9 south of I-84; 41°31′21″N 73°53′23″W	Fishkill	Site of Revolutionary War-era army supply depot. Area around Van Wyck Homestead still has potential to yield much information in archeological digs.
35	Fishkill Village District	Fishkill Village District	March 20, 1973 (#73001181)	Roughly along NY 52 from Cary St. to Hopewell St. 41°32′03″N 73°54′05″W	Fishkill	Many well-preserved 19th century homes and commercial buildings in the center of the village
36	Franklin Delano Roosevelt High School	Franklin Delano Roosevelt High School	January 7, 2011 (#10001125)	23 Haviland Rd. 41°32′03″N 73°54′05″W	Hyde Park	Now Haviland Middle School, one of three schools erected as a Depression-era Public Works Administration project in Hyde Park
37	Graham-Brush Log House	Graham-Brush Log House	July 22, 1999 (#99000870)	Church St. 41°58′48″N 73°39′20″W	Pine Plains	
38	Grinnell-Satterlee House		May 11, 2026 (#100012993)	63 Channingville Road; 41°35′46″N 73°56′10″W	Wappingers Falls	
39	Halfway Diner	Halfway Diner	January 7, 1988 (#87002297)	39 N. Broadway; 41°59′48″N 73°52′29″W	Red Hook	Intact 1925 Silk City diner; has been in two other locations. A Red Hook institution and first diner in state listed on Register.
40	Haxtun-Tower House	Haxtun-Tower House	August 22, 2016 (#16000552)	4 Baker Rd. 41°36′50″N 73°42′35″W	Hopewell Junction	Late Greek Revival house built around 1850 by one prominent local iron magnate and expanded later by another
41	Heermance Farmhouse	Heermance Farmhouse	May 6, 1980 (#80002604)	N of Red Hook on W. Kerley Corners Rd. 42°02′43″N 73°51′46″W	Red Hook	Built in the 18th century; noted for its distinct decorative architectural features.
42	John Hendricks House and Dutch Barn	John Hendricks House and Dutch Barn	September 7, 1984 (#84002373)	Old Post Rd. 41°50′42″N 73°55′38″W	Staatsburg	Intact 1785 stone house probably used as inn for Albany Post Road travelers. Barn redone in Picturesque mode by William Dinsmore.
43	Hiddenhurst	Hiddenhurst	February 21, 1991 (#91000102)	Sheffield Hill Rd. NW of jct. with Sharon Station Rd. 41°53′49″N 73°30′42″W	Millerton	1903 retirement estate of industrialist Thomas Hidden is most architecturally distinctive house in Coleman Station
44	Hopewell Junction Depot	Hopewell Junction Depot	February 24, 2021 (#100005449)	36 Railroad Ave. 41°35′06″N 73°48′24″W	Hopewell Junction	
45	Home of Franklin D. Roosevelt National Historic Site	Home of Franklin D. Roosevelt National Historic Site	October 15, 1966 (#66000056)	2 mi (3.2 km). S of Hyde Park on U.S. 9; 41°45′59″N 73°56′21″W	Hyde Park	Springwood estate, Roosevelt's home in childhood and much of his adult life
46	Joseph Horton House	Joseph Horton House	November 2, 1988 (#88000916)	NY 376, New Hackensack Rd. 41°37′23″N 73°52′19″W	New Hackensack	
47	Howard Mansion and Carriage House		August 19, 1993 (#93000862)	Howard Blvd. 41°47′53″N 73°56′05″W	Hyde Park	
48	Howland Library	Howland Library	May 7, 1973 (#73001180)	477 Main St. 41°30′07″N 73°57′55″W	Beacon	Early Richard Morris Hunt building using Norwegian elements; now a cultural center
49	Hudson River Heritage Historic District	Hudson River Heritage Historic District	December 14, 1990 (#90002219)	East side Hudson River between Germantown and Staatsburg; 42°01′07″N 73°54′32″W	Staatsburg, Rhinebeck and Red Hook, also Columbia County	30-mile (48 km) strip along east bank of Hudson preserving much architecture and land use from feudalistic colonial era. Largest historic district on U.S. mainland.
50	Hyde Park Elementary School	Hyde Park Elementary School	September 2, 1993 (#93000860)	Post Rd. N of jct. with Fuller Ln. 41°47′28″N 73°56′10″W	Hyde Park	1940 fieldstone building designed in close consultation with Franklin D. Roosevelt
51	Hyde Park Firehouse	Hyde Park Firehouse	September 2, 1993 (#93000859)	Post Rd. S of jct. with Market St. 41°47′28″N 73°56′14″W	Hyde Park	
52	Hyde Park Railroad Station	Hyde Park Railroad Station	September 11, 1981 (#81000403)	River Rd. 41°47′14″N 73°56′49″W	Hyde Park	1914 station was where Roosevelt received King George VI and Queen Elizabeth; today a rail museum.
53	Indian Rock Schoolhouse	Indian Rock Schoolhouse	April 1, 2002 (#02000306)	Mygatt Rd. 41°51′40″N 73°32′48″W	Amenia	1850 one-room schoolhouse is only one of 12 in town surviving intact
54	Innisfree Garden	Innisfree Garden	September 3, 2019 (#100004333)	362 Tyrrel Rd. 41°45′37″N 73°44′50″W	Millbrook	1930s landscape garden was first in U.S. to use Chinese design principles
55	John Kane House	John Kane House	October 20, 1980 (#80002603)	126 E. Main St. 41°33′22″N 73°35′31″W	Pawling	Home of 1766 Anti-Rent War leader William Prendergast and, later, Kane; confiscated after the latter became a Loyalist in 1777 and used by Washington as headquarters the next year. Today a local museum
56	LaGrange District Schoolhouse	LaGrange District Schoolhouse	May 28, 2013 (#13000328)	2 Dr. Fink Rd. 41°40′26″N 73°48′20″W	Freedom Plains	One-room schoolhouse built in 1860s remained in use through 1940s
57	Langdon Estate Gatehouse	Langdon Estate Gatehouse	September 2, 1993 (#93000865)	US 9, N of jct. with Market St. 41°47′28″N 73°56′16″W	Hyde Park	Built in 1876 in the Renaissance Revival style
58	Lower Main Street Historic District	Lower Main Street Historic District	January 7, 1988 (#87002198)	142-192 & 131-221 Main St. 41°30′28″N 73°58′32″W	Beacon	Well-preserved commercial buildings at core of early settlement in area
59	Lynfeld	Lynfeld	March 19, 1987 (#87000474)	South Rd. 41°46′23″N 73°44′40″W	Washington	1871 Italianate farmhouse
60	Main Street-Albertson Street-Park Place Historic District	Main Street-Albertson Street-Park Place Historic District	September 2, 1993 (#93000856)	Roughly, Main St. between Park Pl. and US 9, Park between Main and Albertson St. and Albertson adjacent to Park; 41°47′20″N 73°56′17″W	Hyde Park	19th-century core of Hyde Park, with many intact vernacular buildings
61	Main Street Historic District	Main Street Historic District	January 27, 2010 (#09001284)	Main St., North, South Center St. and John St.; Dutchess Ave., Park Ave., South Maple Ave and Elm Ave. 41°57′13″N 73°30′39″W	Millerton	Historic core of country town
62	Maizefield	Maizefield	November 26, 1973 (#73001184)	75 W. Market St. 41°59′52″N 73°52′56″W	Red Hook	Early 19th-century Federal style mansion of former Continental Army general features 1849 Alexander Jackson Davis frame cottage.
63	Marquardt Farm	Marquardt Farm	July 9, 1987 (#87001075)	Wurtemburg Rd. 41°53′09″N 73°52′06″W	Wurtemburg	
64	Hendrick Martin House	Hendrick Martin House	August 2, 2007 (#07000776)	65 Willowbrook Ln. 42°00′18″N 73°52′28″W	Red Hook	Well-preserved mid-18th century stone house built by second-generation Palatine German family is possibly the oldest house in the town of Red Hook.
65	Melius-Bentley House		August 11, 1982 (#82005024)	N of Pine Plains on Mt. Ross Rd. 42°00′19″N 73°42′36″W	Pine Plains	
66	Montgomery Place	Montgomery Place	May 2, 1975 (#75001184)	Annandale Rd. 42°00′52″N 73°55′08″W	Annandale-on-Hudson	Only remaining estate house from early 19th century largely intact. Shows growing influence of French styles.
67	Mt. Beacon Fire Observation Tower	Mt. Beacon Fire Observation Tower	October 23, 2009 (#09000862)	South Beacon Mountain summit 41°28′53″N 73°56′39″W	Beacon	
68	Mount Beacon Incline Railway	Mount Beacon Incline Railway	November 23, 1982 (#82001151)	Howland Ave. and Wolcott St. 41°29′25″N 73°57′22″W	Beacon and Fishkill	Site of popular 20th-century attraction offering view of the Hudson Highlands and surrounding area.
69	Mount Gulian	Mount Gulian	November 19, 1982 (#82001152)	N of Beacon off I-84; 41°31′25″N 73°58′54″W	Fishkill	Headquarters of Friedrich Wilhelm von Steuben during Revolution
70	Mulhern House		September 29, 1984 (#84002376)	14-16 Market St. 41°35′57″N 73°55′16″W	Wappingers Falls	1815 house used by workers at Dutchess Co; destroyed in an explosion 1994
71	Lewis Mumford House	Lewis Mumford House	October 15, 1999 (#99001209)	187 Leedsville Rd. 41°51′01″N 73°30′47″W	Amenia	Home of famous sociologist Lewis Mumford for over half a century
72	Murphy Grist Mill	Murphy Grist Mill	May 18, 2015 (#15000230)	138 Beekman Poughquag Rd. 41°36′39″N 73°42′09″W	Poughquag	Well-preserved mill complex was early catalyst for local settlement. Franklin D. Roosevelt gave one his first political speeches from the 1889 house while running for state senate in 1909; later his son would own the building
73	National Biscuit Company Carton Making and Printing Plant	National Biscuit Company Carton Making and Printing Plant	April 18, 2003 (#03000253)	3 Beekman St. 41°30′00″N 73°58′58″W	Beacon	Now Dia:Beacon. Largely intact factory recently turned into art museum for large modern installations
74	New Guinea Community Site	New Guinea Community Site	February 2, 2018 (#100002073)	Hackett Hill Park; 41°47′18″N 73°55′37″W	Hyde Park	Former site of a community of freed slaves and free African-Americans; foundations and walls survive
75	Newcomb-Brown Estate	Newcomb-Brown Estate	October 7, 1988 (#88001704)	Brown Rd. at US 44; 41°45′28″N 73°47′01″W	Pleasant Valley	1770 house of local farmer and landowner shows some Dutch influences; remains mostly intact
76	Nine Partners Meeting House and Cemetery	Nine Partners Meeting House and Cemetery	April 27, 1989 (#89000300)	NY 343; 41°46′32″N 73°41′17″W	Millbrook	1780 built brick meeting house replaced a log meeting house built on the same location in 1745. Still used occasionally for Society of Friends Meetings
77	Oblong Friends Meetinghouse	Oblong Friends Meetinghouse	January 12, 1973 (#73001182)	Meetinghouse Rd. on Quaker Hill; 41°34′45″N 73°32′33″W	Pawling	1764-built meetinghouse was home to first American Quaker group to refuse services or financial assistance from slaveowners, in 1767. Later used as hospital by Continental Army
78	Oswego Meeting House and Friends' Cemetery	Oswego Meeting House and Friends' Cemetery	April 27, 1989 (#89000301)	Oswego Rd. at jct. with Smith Rd. 41°42′10″N 73°43′46″W	Moore's Mill	
79	Parker Training Academy Dutch Barn	Parker Training Academy Dutch Barn	October 3, 2007 (#07001035)	527 Turkey Hill Rd. 42°01′06″N 73°49′03″W	Red Hook	One of the last New World Dutch barns built in the Hudson Valley, around 1790
80	The Pines	The Pines	September 26, 1983 (#83001668)	Maple St. 41°58′58″N 73°39′24″W	Pine Plains	
81	Pultz Farmhouse	Pultz Farmhouse	July 9, 1987 (#87001074)	Wurtemburg Rd. 41°54′02″N 73°52′04″W	Wurtemburg	
82	Pulver-Bird House	Pulver-Bird House	July 25, 2008 (#08000700)	983 Hunns Lake Road; 41°54′40″N 73°38′03″W	Stanford	
83	Quaker Lane Farms	Quaker Lane Farms	December 18, 2003 (#03001303)	11 Ruskey Ln. 41°48′36″N 73°51′45″W	Hyde Park	1804 Farm
84	Reformed Dutch Church of Fishkill Landing	Reformed Dutch Church of Fishkill Landing	August 31, 1988 (#88001438)	44-50 Ferry St. 41°30′23″N 73°59′34″W	Beacon	1859 church designed by Frederick Clarke Withers is one of his rare uses of Victorian Gothic for a religious building. Today known as Reformed Church of Beacon.
85	Reformed Dutch Church, Parsonage and Lecture Hall	Reformed Dutch Church, Parsonage and Lecture Hall	September 2, 1993 (#93000861)	US 9 N of jct. with Market St. 41°47′32″N 73°56′16″W	Hyde Park	1826 Federal-style church of congregation in existence since 1789
86	Archibald Rogers Estate		September 2, 1993 (#93000864)	Jct. of Mansion and Garden Sts. 41°46′46″N 73°56′22″W	Hyde Park	
87	Rokeby	Rokeby	March 26, 1975 (#75001181)	S of Barrytown between Hudson River and River Rd. 41°59′16″N 73°55′28″W	Barrytown	
88	Roosevelt Point Cottage and Boathouse	Roosevelt Point Cottage and Boathouse	September 2, 1993 (#93000851)	River Point Rd. at the Hudson R. 41°44′22″N 73°56′12″W	Hyde Park	1860 Carpenter Gothic cottage; boathouse where John Roosevelt kept his championship ice yachts
89	Eleanor Roosevelt National Historic Site	Eleanor Roosevelt National Historic Site	March 20, 1980 (#80000357)	Violet Ave. 41°45′41″N 73°53′58″W	Hyde Park	Val-Kill, cottage of Eleanor Roosevelt
90	Isaac Roosevelt House	Isaac Roosevelt House	September 2, 1993 (#93000857)	Riverview Cir., E side 41°44′13″N 73°55′58″W	Hyde Park	1832 main house of Rosedale, estate of FDR's grandfather, shows mix of late Federal and Italianate elements.
91	George Rymph House	George Rymph House	August 19, 1993 (#93000863)	US 9 S of jct. with S. Cross Rd. 41°49′21″N 73°56′09″W	Hyde Park	One of the few remaining pre-Revolutionary houses in Hyde Park
92	St. Luke's Episcopal Church Complex	St. Luke's Episcopal Church Complex	May 30, 2008 (#08000517)	Wolcott Ave. & Rector St. 41°29′53″N 73°57′51″W	Beacon	Frederick Clarke Withers considered this 1869 church to be one of his best works; epitomizes Ecclesiological theories about Episcopalian church architecture.
93	Saint Mark's Episcopal Church	Saint Mark's Episcopal Church	August 25, 1987 (#87001369)	Liberty St. 41°33′07″N 73°58′05″W	Chelsea	
94	St. Margaret's Home	St. Margaret's Home	September 28, 2006 (#06000883)	7260 South Broadway; 41°58′51″N 73°52′57″W	Red Hook	
95	St. Paul's (Zion's) Evangelical Lutheran Church	St. Paul's (Zion's) Evangelical Lutheran Church	August 31, 1998 (#98001065)	57 S Broadway; 41°59′28″N 73°52′40″W	Red Hook	1890 church is very sophisticated Romanesque Revival design for small town
96	St. Paul's Lutheran Church, Parsonage and Cemetery	St. Paul's Lutheran Church, Parsonage and Cemetery	July 9, 1987 (#87001083)	Wurtemburg Rd. 41°53′53″N 73°52′19″W	Wurtemburg	
97	St. Thomas' Episcopal Church	St. Thomas' Episcopal Church	April 6, 2005 (#05000261)	Leedsville Rd., N side, W of NY 41; 41°49′37″N 73°30′21″W	Amenia Union	1851 Richard Upjohn church in English rural Gothic Revival style
98	Second Baptist Church of Dover	Second Baptist Church of Dover	August 30, 2010 (#10000589)	29 Mill St. 41°44′27″N 73°34′43″W	Dover Plains	1830s wooden church
99	Shear Homestead		February 24, 2021 (#100005479)	34 Rymph Rd. 41°38′58″N 73°46′57″W	Lagrangeville	
100	Smithfield Presbyterian Church	Smithfield Presbyterian Church	February 3, 2012 (#11001090)	656 Smithfield Valley Rd. 41°53′10″N 73°36′00″W	Amenia	1847 Greek Revival church complex was center of small rural settlement. Burials in cemetery date to the 1730s.
101	Stony Kill Farm	Stony Kill Farm	March 20, 1980 (#80002601)	W of Fishkill on NY 9D; 41°32′27″N 73°56′20″W	Fishkill	Farm owned by early landowners the Verplanck family still in use as state environmental education center
102	Storm–Adriance–Brinckerhoff House	Storm–Adriance–Brinckerhoff House	July 3, 2008 (#08000581)	451 Beekman Rd. 41°35′49″N 73°45′40″W	East Fishkill	Wooden Dutch Colonial house built in 1759 and expanded since; residents have include some of county's prominent families.
103	William Stoutenburgh House	William Stoutenburgh House	September 27, 1972 (#72000830)	U.S. 9G, East Park; 41°47′15″N 73°54′54″W	Hyde Park	Built about 1765, constructed of fieldstone
104	Sutherland Cemetery		August 27, 2020 (#100005468)	305 Market Ln. 41°53′01″N 73°44′27″W	Stanfordville	
105	Sylvan Lake Rock Shelter	Sylvan Lake Rock Shelter	July 12, 1974 (#74001231)	Address Restricted	Sylvan Lake	
106	Tabor-Wing House	Tabor-Wing House	June 3, 1982 (#82003355)	NY 22 and Cemetery Rd. 41°44′19″N 73°34′47″W	Dover Plains	Unusually detailed 1810 Federal-style house of prominent families in area. Later used as Dover Plains library; home to town historical society
107	Taconic State Parkway	Taconic State Parkway	December 8, 2005 (#05001398)	Linear north-south across central county 41°46′32″N 73°46′05″W	East Fishkill, LaGrange, Pleasant Valley, Stanford, Milan	Scenic divided highway planned by Franklin D. Roosevelt for state park access. Built between the 1920s and early 1960s, epitomizing peak period of parkway design.
108	Thorne Memorial School	Thorne Memorial School	December 6, 1996 (#96001473)	Jct. of Maple and Franklin Aves. 41°47′09″N 73°41′26″W	Millbrook	Beaux-Arts school built and donated to community by wealthy resident in 1895 remained in use as high school until 1962
109	Tioronda Bridge	Tioronda Bridge	October 8, 1976 (#76001213)	South Ave. 41°29′19″N 73°58′28″W	Beacon	One of the last remaining bowstring truss bridges in the U.S. Roadway has been dismantled due to structural deterioration, but could be rebuilt in future
110	Tioronda Estate-Craig House Historic District		May 5, 2023 (#100008896)	7 Craig House Ln., 21 Grandview Ave., 636 and 644 Wolcott Ave. 41°29′20″N 73°58′04″W	Beacon vicinity	
111	Elias Titus House	Elias Titus House	July 12, 2006 (#06000568)	170 Titusville Rd. 41°39′53″N 73°52′20″W	Red Oaks Mill	Home built in 1840 in the Greek Revival style featuring a temple front elevation
112	Top Cottage	Top Cottage	December 9, 1997 (#97001679)	24 Potters Bend Rd. 41°45′54″N 73°53′22″W	Hyde Park	Designed by FDR as a possible post-presidential residence, this was one of the first fully disabled-accessible buildings in the U.S. and the first one anywhere in the world designed by a disabled person.
113	Benjamin C. Tousey House		August 19, 1994 (#94001002)	Jct. of Salt Point Tpk. and Schultzville Rd. 41°50′03″N 73°45′58″W	Clinton	
114	John H. Traver Farm	John H. Traver Farm	July 9, 1987 (#87001081)	Wurtemburg Rd. 41°53′40″N 73°52′03″W	Wurtemburg	
115	Trinity Methodist Church	Trinity Methodist Church	January 12, 2010 (#09001227)	8 Mattie Cooper Square; 41°30′29″N 73°58′23″W	Beacon	Now the Springfield Baptist Church
116	US Post Office-Beacon	US Post Office-Beacon	November 17, 1988 (#88002456)	369 Main St. 41°30′15″N 73°58′52″W	Beacon	First of several fieldstone post offices built in county during Depression in native Dutch Colonial Revival style championed by Roosevelt. One of Gilbert Stanley Underwood's few buildings in the eastern U.S.
117	US Post Office-Hyde Park	US Post Office-Hyde Park	May 11, 1989 (#88002511)	E. Market St. and US 9; 41°47′30″N 73°56′11″W	Hyde Park	Modeled after demolished 1772 John Bard House, the personal choice of Hyde Park native Franklin D. Roosevelt.
118	US Post Office-Wappingers Falls	US Post Office-Wappingers Falls	May 11, 1989 (#88002440)	2 South Ave. 41°35′49″N 73°55′04″W	Wappingers Falls	Now Wappingers Falls Village Hall. Another post office design overseen by Roosevelt. Today used as village hall
119	Van Wyck-Wharton House	Van Wyck-Wharton House	April 13, 1972 (#72000828)	S of Fishkill on U.S. 9; 41°31′23″N 73°53′22″W	Fishkill	Key supply depot during Revolution
120	Vanderbilt Lane Historic District	Vanderbilt Lane Historic District	September 2, 1993 (#93000855)	Jct. of Vanderbilt Ln. and US 9; 41°48′08″N 73°56′14″W	Hyde Park	Intact 19th-century farm buildings that served Langond and Vanderbilt estate across road. One of only two intact estate farm complexes in the Hudson Valley.
121	Vanderbilt Mansion National Historic Site	Vanderbilt Mansion National Historic Site	October 15, 1966 (#66000059)	N edge of Hyde Park, U.S. 9; 41°47′50″N 73°56′33″W	Hyde Park	1898 mansion by McKim, Mead & White for Frederick William Vanderbilt; considered one of their finest residential works.
122	Wales House	Wales House	August 19, 1993 (#93000858)	23 W. Market St. 41°44′13″N 73°56′14″W	Hyde Park	1896 Colonial Revival home built by Frederick Vanderbilt for his secretary
123	Wappingers Falls Historic District	Wappingers Falls Historic District	September 29, 1984 (#84002380)	Roughly bounded by South Ave., Elm, Main, Park, Walker, Market, and McKinley Sts. 41°35′50″N 73°55′17″W	Wappingers Falls	Core of 19th-century industrial village, with many original buildings
124	Warren Masonic Lodge #32	Warren Masonic Lodge #32	June 5, 2007 (#07000491)	1215 Centre Rd. 41°53′00″N 73°48′15″W	Schultzville	
125	Webutuck Agricultural Valley Historic District		September 30, 2024 (#100009322)	Leedsville, Amenia Union, South Amenia, and Kent Rds. in NY; Amenia Union and Knibloe Hill Rds. in CT; 41°49′27″N 73°30′20″W	Amenia vicinity	Extends into Litchfield County, Connecticut.
126	Wethersfield		March 25, 2021 (#100006303)	257 Pugsley Hill Rd. 41°53′10″N 73°37′58″W	Amenia	
127	Wheeler Hill Historic District	Wheeler Hill Historic District	June 14, 1991 (#91000678)	Wheeler Hill Rd. 41°34′36″N 73°56′37″W	Wappinger	
128	Thomas N. Wheeler Farm	Thomas N. Wheeler Farm	November 22, 2000 (#00001417)	Indian Lake Rd. 41°54′57″N 73°30′59″W	Millerton	1800 farmhouse in Coleman Station
129	Winans-Huntting House		May 15, 2017 (#100000995)	51 Bethel Cross Road; 41°56′52″N 73°38′35″W	Pine Plains	
130	Windswept Farm		September 7, 1989 (#89001390)	Sunset Trail; 41°51′07″N 73°48′17″W	Clinton	
131	Hendrik Winegar House		April 15, 1975 (#75001180)	Southeast of Amenia on SR 2 off NY 343; 41°49′40″N 73°30′41″W	Amenia	1761 house was one of few remnants of original German settlement of Amenia; seems to have been demolished since listing
132	Zion Pilgrim Methodist Episcopal Church Site	Zion Pilgrim Methodist Episcopal Church Site	October 8, 2014 (#14000845)	303 Baxtertown Rd. 41°32′51″N 73°55′30″W	Fishkill	Site of historic black church that was center of local community.

== See also ==
- National Register of Historic Places listings in New York
