= Beekman Meeting House and Friends' Cemetery =

Historic cemetery in Dutchess County, New York

- U.S. National Register of Historic Places
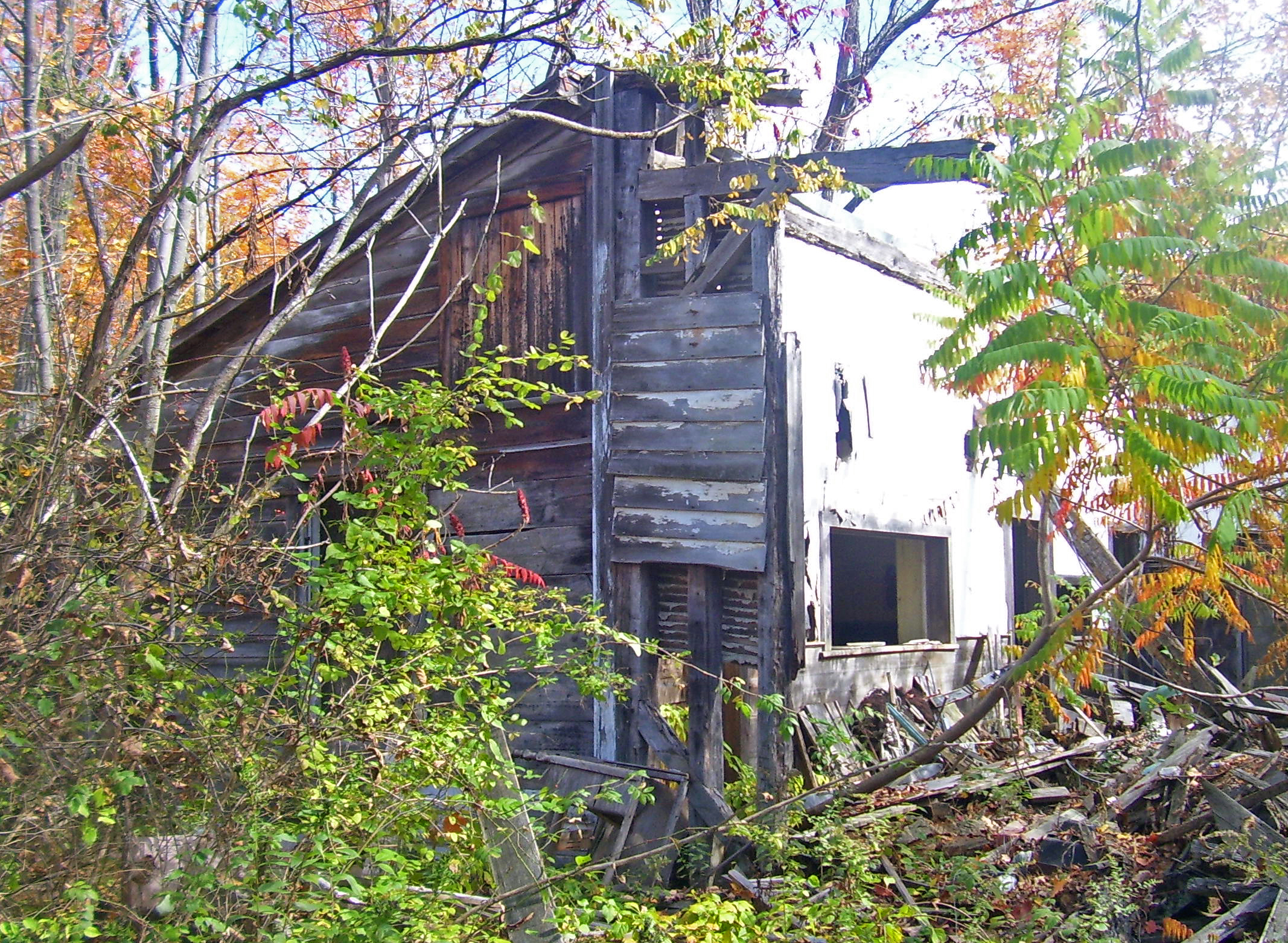
- Ruins of house, 2008

- Location within New York Location within the United States
- Location: Emans Rd., LaGrangeville
- Nearest city: Poughkeepsie
- Coordinates: 41°38′1″N 73°45′59″W
- Area: 0.9 acres (3,600 m^{2})
- Built: 1809
- MPS: Dutchess County Quaker Meeting Houses TR
- NRHP reference No.: 89000303
- Added to NRHP: April 27, 1989

Beekman Meeting House and Friends' Cemetery is located on Emans Road in LaGrangeville, New York, United States. The meeting house is a wooden building from the early 19th century that has been unused and vacant for decades. As a result, it is in an advanced state of decay, and mostly collapsed. The cemetery, better preserved, is located a short distance away.

The meeting house was built in 1809 for a meeting that split off from another one in the nearby hamlet of Oswego. After the Hicksite-Orthodox schism in 1828, it was one of only two meetings in the county to embrace Orthodox Quakerism. After that meeting dissolved in the early 20th century, it was for a time a Grange hall. It and its nearby cemetery were added to the National Register of Historic Places in 1989.

== Meetinghouse ==
The house is located on Emans Road, which runs parallel to state highway NY 82 a mile north of the Taconic State Parkway's Arthursburg exit. It is located on an overgrown lot of just under an acre returning to forest at the northeast corner of the Pulling Road intersection. The neighborhood is residential, with houses on large, mostly cleared lots in an otherwise wooded area. There is a small, swampy pond to the east.

Only the northernmost section of the house remains standing, a small service wing of the original building. It is a shed-roofed one-and-a-half-story frame structure sided in clapboard. A boarded-up window is located in the apex of the building; an open frame is on the ground story. The south side is an exposed interior wall with doorways and openings to the kitchen intact. It is painted white; the similar paint on the exterior walls has mostly faded and flaked off. On the ground to the south are scattered wooden debris roughly corresponding to the house's onetime footprint.

== Cemetery ==
The cemetery is on a separate parcel on the south side of Pulling Road, 600 feet (180 m) southeast of the meetinghouse. A small path goes to it between two new houses. It is a small, quiet graveyard surrounded by woods, with stones dating to the mid-19th century. Of the Quaker graveyards in the county, it is the one closest to the original principles.

It is not certain whether the cemetery and meetinghouse were originally on the same large parcel. The pond is directly between the two, and there is no evidence of a path. It may have been chosen as the cemetery site since it was on a rise and drier than the land closer to the meetinghouse where a cemetery would usually be located.

== History ==
Throughout the 18th century, Quakers had moved into Dutchess County from other regions of the colonies, particularly New England. They sought less settled areas, where they could practice their religion without being disturbed or persecuted and live lives closer to nature and God. In the later 18th century, Quaker emigrations dwindled both as the county grew, and especially during the Revolutionary War as it became more militarized.

The meeting was founded in the years just before 1800 by members of the nearby Oswego Meeting in Moore's Mill when there were enough of them who lived in what was still at the time part of the Town of Beekman to constitute their own meeting. Their first meeting house, of which no traces remain, was a simple square building, unevenly divided inside with separate entrances for men and women, a feature common in Quaker meetinghouses of that era.

Meetinghouse in 1987, east (front) elevation

By 1809 the Beekman meeting had grown so quickly it was necessary to construct a new building, the one whose wing remains today. In keeping with updated Quaker practice, it was a long building with moderately pitched gable roof and a full-width porch on the west elevation. The original plan called for a 33-by-25-foot (10.1 by 7.6 m) with 11-foot (3.4 m) posts, but the superior meeting ordered the post height reduced a foot (30.5 cm) and the final building varied slightly even from those plans.

The interior had a sliding center partition. Its materials were finely crafted but restrained in decoration, per Quaker doctrine calling for plainness. It was similar to the extant building at Oswego, unsurprising since the Beekman meeting had originally been part of that group.

In 1828 the Hicksite–Orthodox split occurred in American Quakerism. The Beekman meeting was one of only two in the county to take the latter path, in which believers built meetinghouses more like traditional churches and adopted other religious practices. Unlike other Orthodox meetings, the Beekman Friends never hired a pastor, and as a result its meetings became irregular by the early 20th century.

The local Grange began renting the house for meetings, as it did at the Creek and Pleasant Valley meetings, also in Dutchess County. By the 1920s it took over ownership. Twenty years later, it, too, began declining in membership and eventually ceased to exist, leaving the meeting house to deteriorate. With no organization or person behind it doing regular maintenance, the building had become seriously dilapidated by the time it was listed on the Register with some of the other early meetinghouses in the county in 1988. That decline has continued to the point where little of it stands today.

== See also ==
- National Register of Historic Places listings in Dutchess County, New York
