= Cornelius Carman House =

Historic house in New York, United States

- U.S. National Register of Historic Places
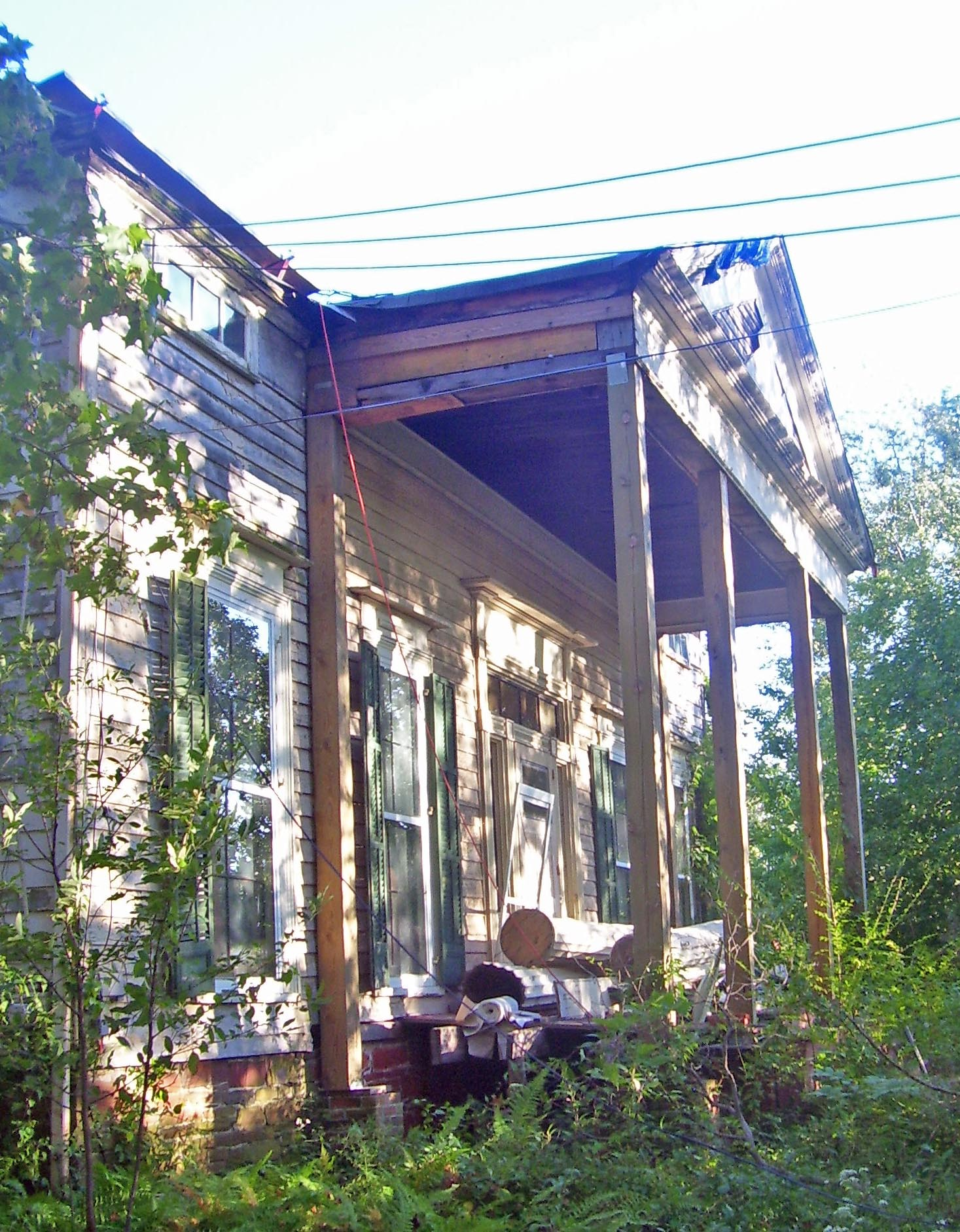
- West elevation, 2008

- Location within New York Location within the United States
- Location: Chelsea, NY
- Coordinates: 41°33′0″N 73°58′16″W
- Area: 10 acres (4.0 ha)
- Built: 1835
- Architectural style: Federal
- MPS: Chelsea MRA
- NRHP reference No.: 87001372
- Added to NRHP: 1987

The Cornelius Carman House is located along River Road South in Chelsea, New York, United States. It is a wooden house built in the 1830s, overlooking the Hudson River, for Carman, operator of a local shipyard and inventor of a moveable centerboard.

Its architecture exemplifies a late vernacular application of the Federal style common in western Dutchess County at that time, showing the transition to the Greek Revival mode and both Dutch and English influences. In 1987 it was listed on the National Register of Historic Places. It is currently vacant and undergoing some repairs.

== Building ==
The house is situated on a wooded 10-acre (4 ha) lot along River Road South on the south side of Chelsea. It is above the level of the road, which itself is elevated above the river and the tracks of the Metro-North Railroad's Hudson Line to its immediate west. Trees screen the house from the road. Access to the house is provided by an unpaved driveway which begins to the north and parallels the road. There is a garage on the property that is of more modern construction and thus not considered a contributing resource to the National Register listing.

Its one-and-a-half-story rectangular five-bay clapboard-sided gable-roofed main block sits on a raised stone foundation. The roofline is marked by a plain frieze and articulated cornice. Pairs of brick chimneys rise on the north and south.

There are wings on all four sides. On the front (west) facade is the three-bay projecting entrance portico, with a pediment originally supported by four Doric columns (now temporarily replaced by wooden beams). On the rear is a one-story shed-roofed addition. On the north and south are two flat-roofed one-story wings, added later. The south wing was a library; the north one probably an office. It has a small porch. A freestanding third wing, one and a half stories with a gabled roof on a brick basement, was also later attached near the north end of the shed-roofed addition. The connecting passageway between it and the house was itself later adapted into a garage.

The main entrance, framed by stylized pilasters, leads to a central hall that goes all the way to the back of the shed-roofed addition. The interior has been stripped for repair work, but original pieces included a mahogany balustrade on the main stairway and a black marble mantelpiece.

== History ==
Carman acquired the land in 1833 from the Ashburys, local farmers who had subdivided, probably to take advantage of a growing local economy. It is not known what Carman did before 1820, or if he came from somewhere other than Chelsea, but after that year he had operated a shipyard where the Chelsea Yacht Club's clubhouse now stands. He may have been leasing the Ashburys' property for some time before 1833.

At first he built wooden sloops, the most common ship along the river in those days. In their 1908 history The Sloops of the Hudson, William Verplanck and Moses Collyer (whose own house, Driftwood, is nearby) credit him with the invention of a moveable centerboard that allowed sloops more stable maneuvering in the deeper sections of the river without having to sacrifice their ability to put ashore at shallow ports. The one Carman installed on his boat the Freedom is believed to have been the first. It became a standard feature shortly thereafter.

He also changed with the times. When steam-powered vessels began to be used following Robert Fulton's voyage up the river on the Clermont in the 1820s, he began building them. One, the Plow-Boy, was the first steam ferry used on the Newburgh-Fishkill Landing route in 1828.

The home he built in 1835 shows an awareness of the vernacular building traditions of the area. It is basically Georgian in form and Federal in plan, styles associated with Americans of English descent, but maintains the one-and-a-half-story scale of Dutch houses common in the region.

There are some influences of New England traditions, particularly the Greek Revival detailing, typical of houses in that style built in similar settings by merchants and other successful men of the era. The decor is more restrained than on those found in New England. Also relating to that region is the shed-roofed rear addition, not seen on most Hudson Valley homes.

The property originally stretched down to the riverfront, where Carman had his wharves. In the mid-19th century the coming of the Hudson River Railroad, which would eventually displace most river shipping, cut the land in two, although Carman retained access across the tracks.

It remained a private residence in active use until sometime after 1983. At some point between then and the beginning of the 21st century the property fell into its present disused, overgrown state.

== See also ==
- National Register of Historic Places listings in Dutchess County, New York
