= Tousey =

Tousey is a surname. Notable people with the surname include:

- Frank Tousey (1853–1902), American publisher
- Richard Tousey (1908–1997), American astronomer
- Sheila Tousey (born 1959), Native American actress

== See also ==
- Benjamin C. Tousey House
- Camp Tousey, summer camp
