= New Guinea Community Site =

Former free Black settlement in New York, US

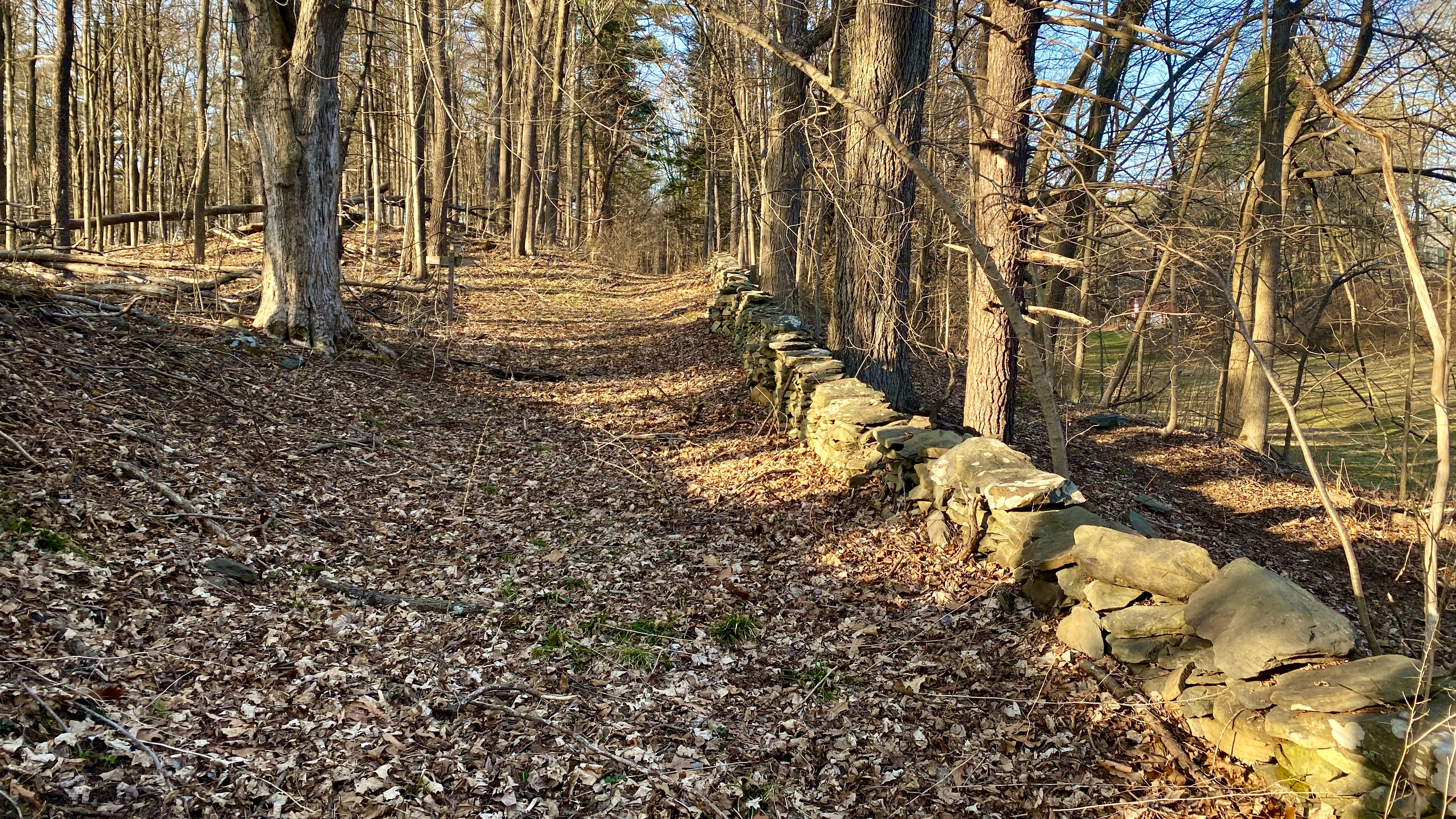
- Freedonia Lane in 2022

- Location within New York Location within the United States
- Location: Hyde Park; Dutchess County, New York
- Nearest city: Poughkeepsie, NY
- Coordinates: 41°47′17.88″N 73°55′36.84″W
- Area: 45 acres (18 ha)

Significant dates
- Added to NRHP: 2018
- Designated NRHP: 2018

The New Guinea Community Site is a former free Black community on the National Register of Historic Places, located in Hyde Park, New York. It emerged in the decades leading up to the Civil War, and dissipated quickly after the war ended.

== Description ==
The New Guinea Community Site was listed on the National Register of Historic Places in 2018. It was a transient free Black community and was typical of such communities in that it emerged in the decades prior to the Civil War, but dissipated after the war’s conclusion and the national abolition of slavery.

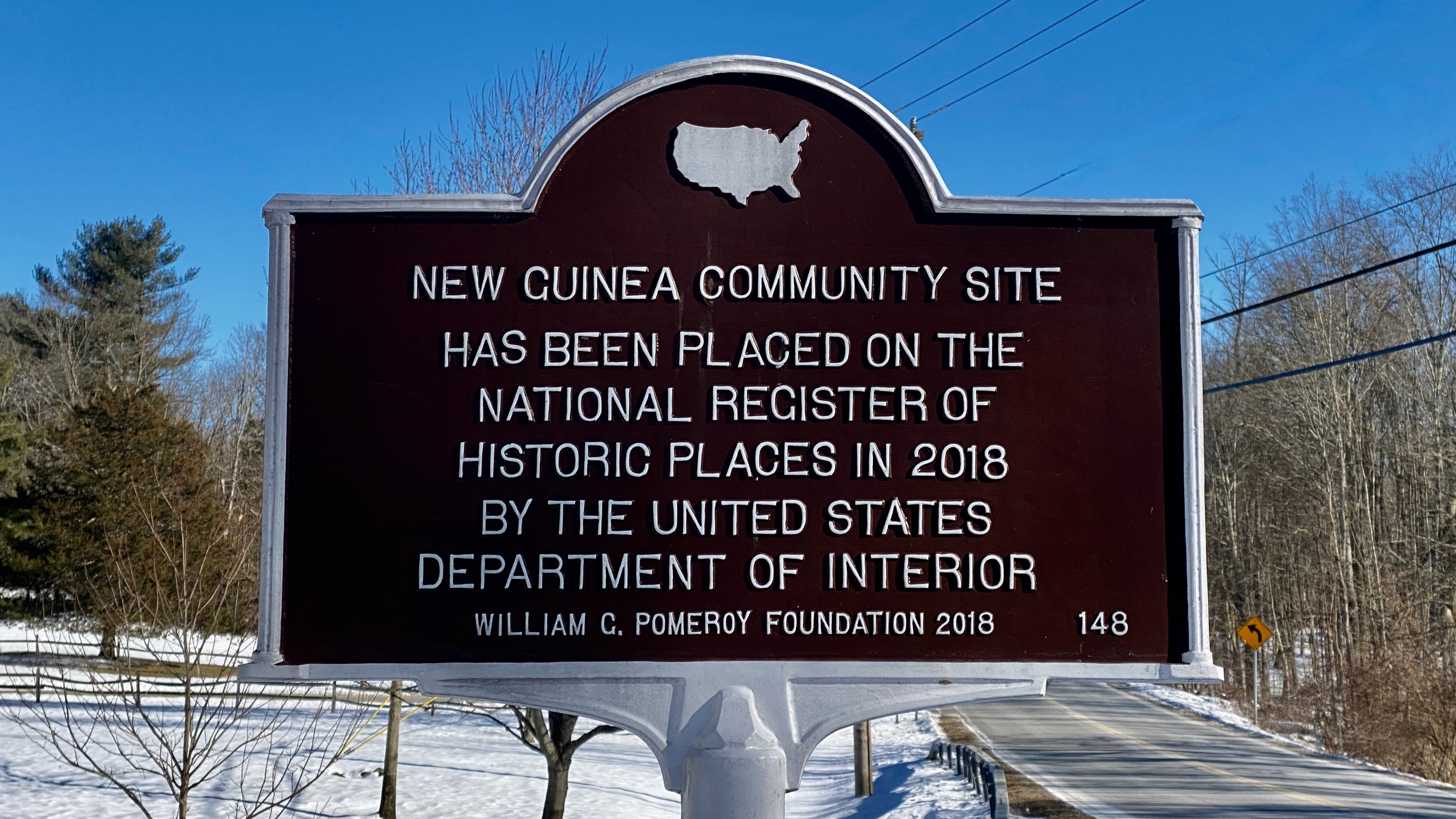
William G Pomeroy Foundation historic marker noting the National Register Historic Places New Guinea Site in Hyde Park, NY

Interviews with former residents conducted by local historian Edward Braman in the late 19th century offer first person testimony.

There were several incentives to form such a community. Self emancipated enslaved persons from the south could either temporarily, or permanently, live in the community without much notice. Free persons of color were always at risk of being kidnapped and illegally sold into slavery in the south, and a proximity of community helped with collective security. At a time when New York had property requirements for African Americans to vote, the New Guinea community offered a chance at property ownership.

Primus Martin was another leader in the settlement of New Guinea. His home site is an archaeological site in Hyde Park. Ceramic fragments found at the site indicate that Martin had communal dining and tea drinking at his home, suggesting that he was well established socially and possibly politically in the community. In the 1860s, John Hackett bought land in the area of "Guinea" and built the Crum Elbow Farm. The community gradually dissolved.

The area was home to free blacks that owned small farms and who worked for 'elite' families along the Hudson river. The area where Primus and Elizabeth Martin stayed was the first area of the excavation project. They were community leaders of Guinea community.

On December 22, 2017, Governor Andrew Cuomo announced 23 properties to be sites recommended by New York State Board of Historic Preservation for the state and national registry as a historic place, including the New Guinea site located at East Market Street in Hyde Park. A sign from the William G. Pomeroy Foundation marks that portion of the site that is located within the Town of Hyde Park’s Hackett Hill park. Work by the Dutchess County Historical Society in 2022 revealed that the New Guinea extended immediately west of the Hackett Hill site.

== See also ==
- List of National Historic Landmarks in New York
- National Register of Historic Places listings in Dutchess County, New York
