= Heermance Farmhouse =

Historic house in New York, United States

- Heermance Farm
- U.S. National Register of Historic Places
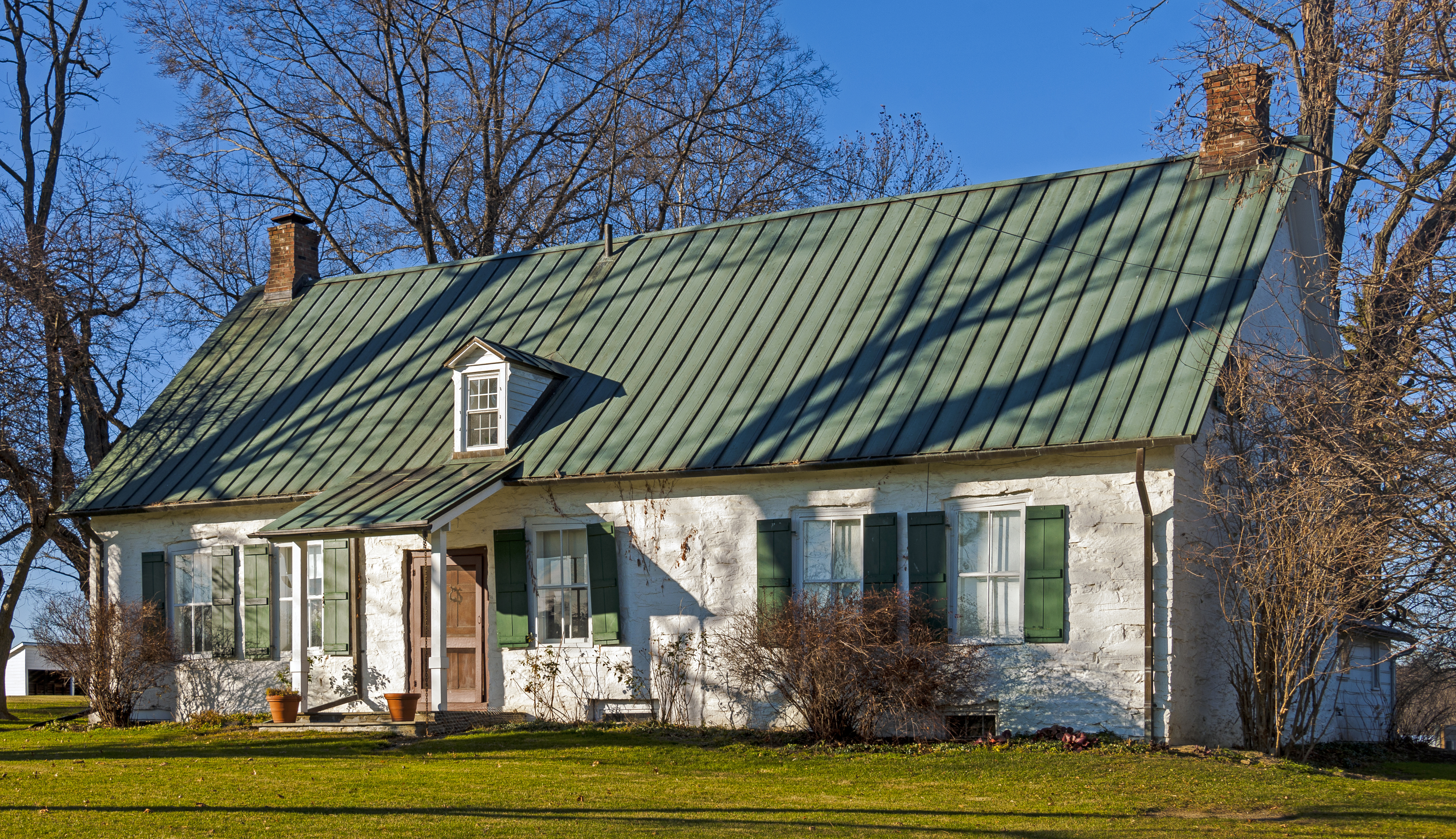
- South elevation, 2015

- Location within New York Location within the United States
- Location: Red Hook, New York
- Coordinates: 42°2′42″N 73°51′44″W
- Built: 1725–1750
- NRHP reference No.: 80002604
- Added to NRHP: May 6, 1980

The Heermance Farmhouse is a historic structure in the town of Red Hook, New York, United States. It was placed on the National Register of Historic Places in 1980, and is an example of an intact 18th-century Dutch stone farmhouse in the Hudson Valley region of the state. It is one of only about six standing stone houses in the town, and possibly its oldest building. The farmhouse is noted for its distinct decorative features and lack of modern alterations.

The building is situated on the north side of West Kerley Corners Road (County Route 78), west of U.S. Route 9. The date of construction is unclear, but is likely between 1725 and 1750. The structure was initially built as a simple two-room residence, but ca. 1772, it was expanded and renovated to include its unusual features. After 1800, the house received few major changes. The Heermance Farmhouse had several owners over the years, but has always been part of a working farm. A restoration was performed during the 1970s, with care to preserve the original character of the home.

== See also ==
- National Register of Historic Places listings in Dutchess County, New York
