= Lynfeld =

Historic house in New York, United States

- U.S. National Register of Historic Places
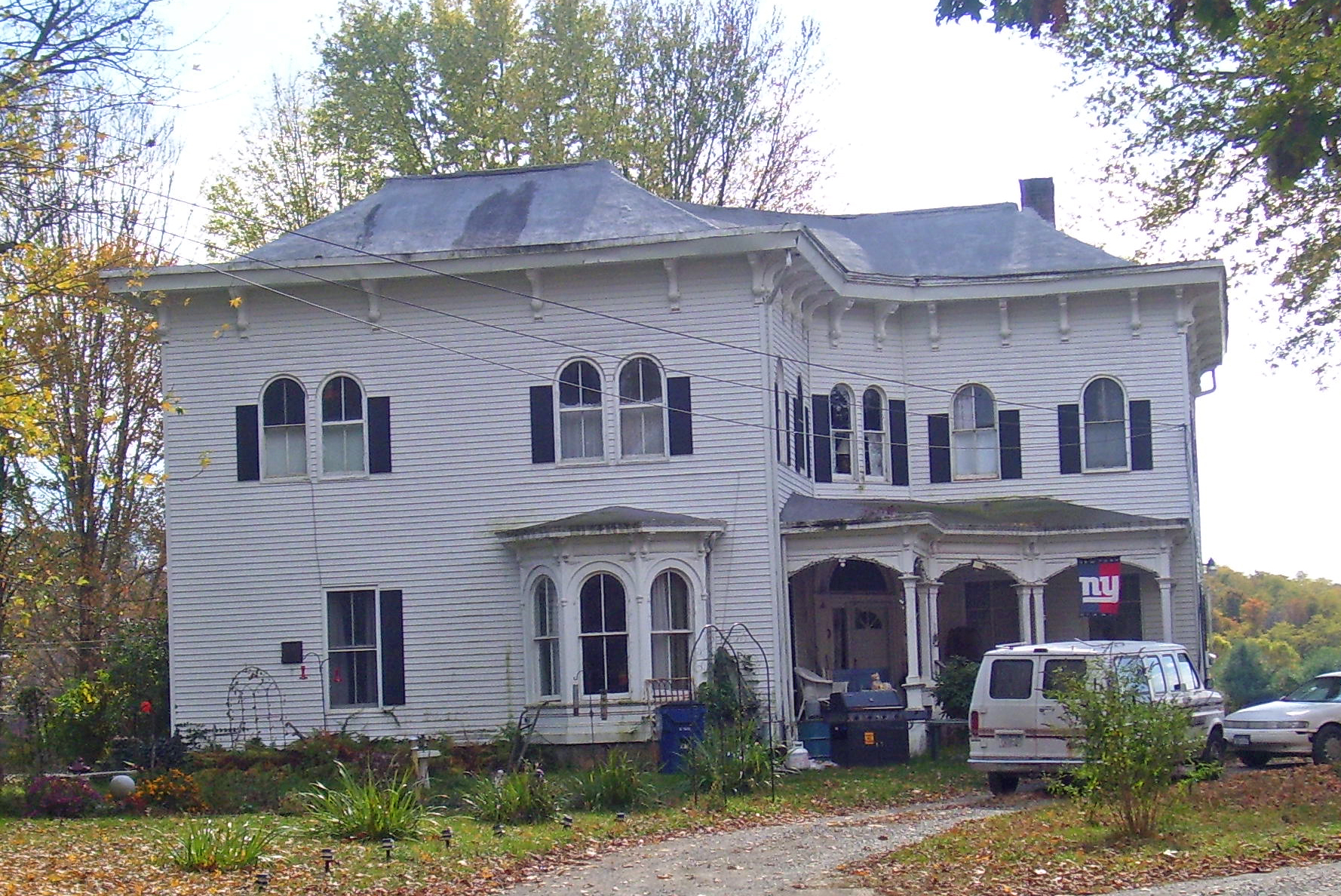
- North profile of main house, 2008

- Location within New York Location within the United States
- Interactive map showing the location of Lynfeld
- Location: Washington, NY
- Nearest city: Poughkeepsie
- Coordinates: 41°46′28″N 73°44′33″W
- Area: 23 acres (9.3 ha)
- Built: 1871
- Architectural style: Italianate
- NRHP reference No.: 87000474
- Added to NRHP: March 19, 1987

Lynfeld is a farm located on South Road in the Town of Washington, New York, United States, near the village of Millbrook. Its farmhouse, a frame structure dating to the late 19th century, is in an unusual shape for a building in the Italianate architectural style.

The land was first part of a much larger farm established sometime in the late 18th century. In the 1870s, the original owner's grandson built the main house. His son was an innovative farmer who was among the first in the Hudson Valley and Dutchess County, and in one case the country, to raise several new species of livestock. It remained in the original family's hands until the late 1960s. In 1987 the farm was listed on the National Register of Historic Places.

== Buildings and grounds ==
Lynfeld is located in the western section of the town, on the south side of South Road just east of its junction with Tyrell Road, a half-mile (1 km) southeast of where South Road splits from the US 44-NY 82 highway. The terrain is gently rolling, with many tributaries draining to the East Branch of Wappinger Creek to the north. A semicircular driveway with trees clustered near it provides access to the six buildings. The land is mostly cleared and under cultivation, as are neighboring farms, a contrast with the wooded areas across Tyrell to the northwest.

=== Main house ===
The main house is located at the driveway's eastern turn. It is a two-story frame clapboard-sided structure with a low pitched metal hipped roof, pierced by a chimney at the southwest, arranged in a rough C shape with the interior angle to the northwest. A wide overhanging eave at the roofline is supported by scroll brackets.

A hip-roofed porch runs the entire width of the five-bay tripartite main facade, on the interior angle. Its roof is supported by square piers that form an arcaded frieze embellished with drop pendants beneath a wide panelled and bracketed cornice. Windows on all facades are mostly paired round-arched windows with louvered shutters.

A tripartite bay window projects from the westernmost bay on the north. It, too, has a bracketed cornice and hipped roof. The south elevation has a two-story rear wing with a porch on the east that also wraps around to part of the main block. Brick steps with iron rails lead up to the rear door.

The main entrance is a deeply recessed paneled door with a round-arched transom. It is surrounded by a molded architrave with a decorative scroll-bracket keystone. Inside, the room layout has been altered moderately with the addition of removable partitions and the conversion of the upstairs into residential apartments. Much of the original finishing remains, including wood, plaster, and marblework. The door and windows have fine molded wooden surrounds. There are cornices in the plaster and marble mantelpieces around the fireplaces, those purely decorative as the house was heated by a system based on a furnace, stoves and hot-air piping.

There are some major decorative touches in the main rooms. The front parlor has an elaborate ceiling medallion, and the library features built in bookcases with glass cabinets. A carved balustrade on the winding, spacious central staircase is intact.

=== Outbuildings ===
To the house's west along the entrance drive is a late 20th-century office building, now used as residential space. It is a two-story frame building with vertical siding and a shed roof. On its east was once a greenhouse, built on the site of an earlier carriage house. Because of its recent construction it is not a contributing resource to the Register listing.

The barn on its west is a contributing resource, since it was built within a few decades of the farmhouse. It is a one-and-a-half-story frame building in horizontal flushboard with a gabled roof. A round-arched window is within its gable end.

Next to it is the dairy/hay barn, also contributing. It is much larger and more complex, with several wings. It is a frame gable-roofed structure built into the slight westward slope, with a similar wing on the west for cows. A small milkhouse is attached to the north side of the wing. Inside, the barn's framing is augmented with long diagonal braces.

Continuing along the driveway, there are two more buildings. A four-bay frame corrugated metal modern machine shed, with an attached smaller shed, is to the hay barn's northwest. To its northeast, close to South Road, is a one-story frame guest cottage. Neither are contributing resources.

== History ==
The ancestors of Lynfeld's builder, Milton Conrad Ham, were German immigrants, war refugees from the Palatine who were resettled on Livingston family lands along the Hudson River in what is now the area between Rhinebeck and Germantown. A plan for them to grow naval stores in the area soon failed due to the region's harsh winters, and the Germans scattered throughout the region looking for new work and living quarters.

Sometime between the late 1710s and 1760s, the first Ham settled near Washington Hollow and began farming a 225-acre (91 ha) tract that includes the present Lynfeld. Local histories suggest that Milton, when he took over the farm in 1871 and built the house, was living on land first purchased by his grandfather Frederick, although it is not known when that transaction took place. The farm was known as "Lynfeld" due to the perceived abundance of linden trees on the property.

An earlier frame farmhouse had been built on the property in Frederick Ham's time. It was not enough for Milton, relatively progressive and sophisticated by the standards of taste among Dutchess County farmers. From an unknown architect, he commissioned a farmhouse in the Italian villa style more commonly used for urban houses and cottages of the era's affluent.

The Lynfeld house was further distinguished among the style by its unusual configuration. Most Italianate buildings combine smaller squarish or cubical forms, with wings, when they exist, at perpendicular angles to the main block. Ham's house was, instead, shaped like a large, fat "C" — a large square block with an interior angle on the northwest that served as a segmented front facade. It was further enhanced with elegant Victorian decorative touches.

From Milton, the farm passed to his son John Milton Ham. The younger man served in several public offices at different levels of government: federally as the Millbrook postmaster, locally as Washington town supervisor and at the county level as Dutchess's county clerk. Like his father, he was drawn to innovations of the era. The hay barn, the larger of the two built during his ownership, used diagonal braces to augment its framing. This newer method eliminated the need for post-and-beam structural systems barns had traditionally used, opening up most of the interior space.

On the farm, he tried out new breeds of livestock. He was one of the first Hudson Valley farmers to raise Holstein-Friesian cattle and keep Percheron horses for stud. He also introduced Berkshire swine and was one of the first American farmers to raise Dorset horned sheep.

In 1936, the original farmhouse, now used as a tenant house, burned down. The cottage was built shortly afterwards. Three decades later, the farm passed out of Ham family ownership after ten generations when Conrad Ham sold the current parcel.

It was later converted for mixed office and residential use. Sometime between its listing on the Register in 1987 and the present day, the house's exterior was made plainer. The frieze and decorative eyebrow windows were removed from below the roofline, replaced with clapboard, and the pediments over some of the first floor windows were also removed.

== See also ==
- National Register of Historic Places listings in Dutchess County, New York
