= Indian Rock Schoolhouse =

- U.S. National Register of Historic Places
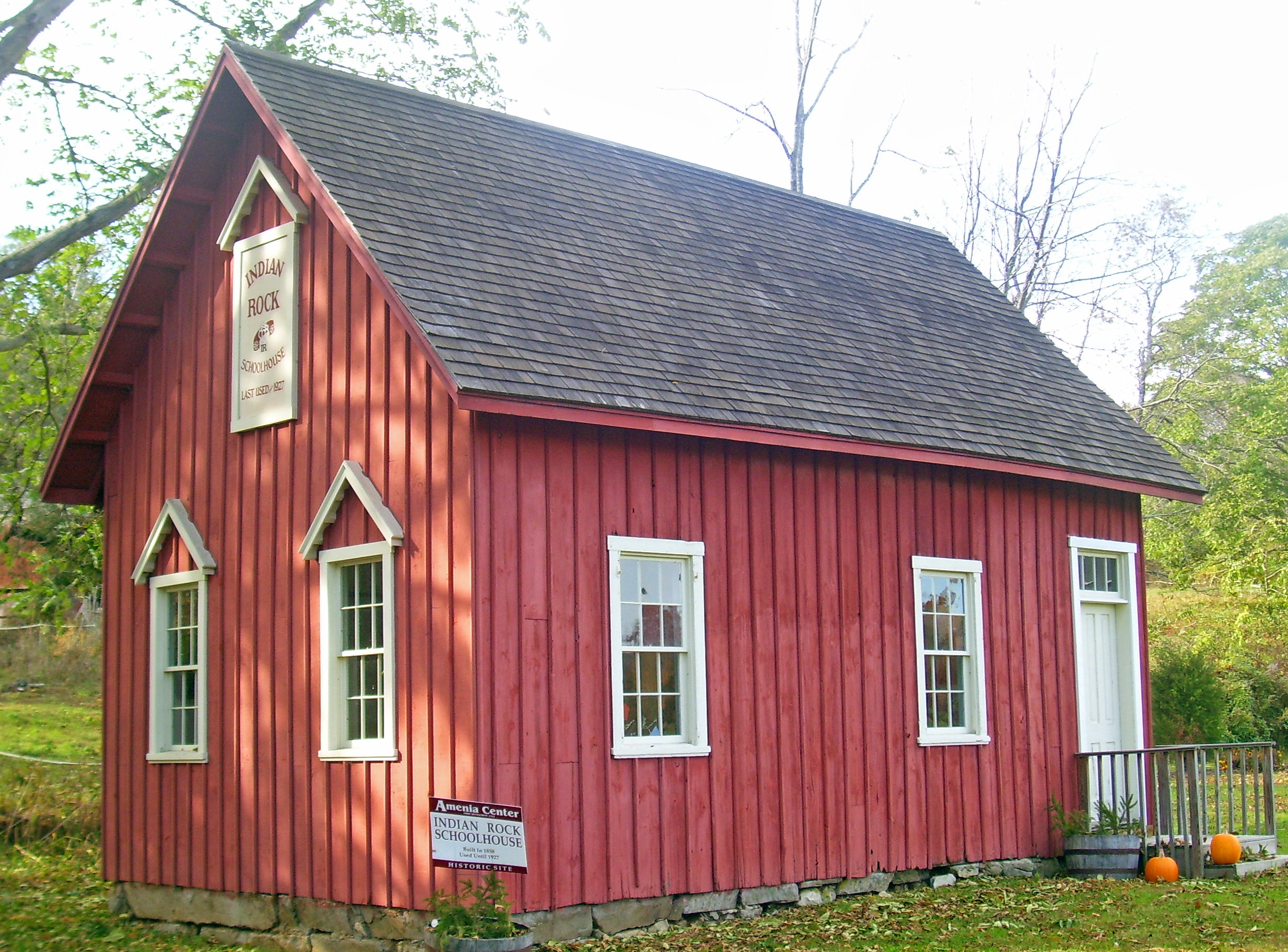

- Location within New York Location within the United States
- Location: Amenia, New York
- Nearest city: Poughkeepsie
- Coordinates: 41°51′40″N 73°32′46″W
- Area: 1 acre (4,000 m^{2})
- Built: ca. 1850
- Architectural style: Gothic Revival
- NRHP reference No.: 02000306
- Added to NRHP: April 1, 2002

Indian Rock Schoolhouse, also known as District 3 Schoolhouse or Webutuck Country Schoolhouse, is located on Mygatt Road in the hamlet of Amenia, New York, United States. It is a wooden one-room schoolhouse built in the mid-19th century in accordance with a standard state plan for small rural schools that reflected contemporary educational reform movements.

Of 12 such schools built in the Town of Amenia during that era, only this one survives mostly intact. It remained in use until 1927. In 2002 it was listed on the National Register of Historic Places. Since then it has been restored by a nearby private school and has been used for community events and historic education.

== Building ==
The school is situated on a 1-acre (0.40 ha) lot on the north side of the road, at the north fringe of the developed area of the hamlet. The surrounding terrain is level, mostly open and rural. Amenia's Rural Cemetery is across the curve in the road. To the west is an altered 18th-century house, with an early 19th-century gambrel-roofed farmhouse on the east. Maplebrook School, a private institution for children with learning disabilities, is to the north, across a meadow.

The building is in the southwest corner of the lot, 40 feet (12 m) from the road at the end of a short gravel driveway. It is a one-story timber-framed structure on a stone foundation 17 by 26 feet (5.2 by 7.9 m) with board-and-batten siding and a steeply pitched gable roof shingled in cedar shake.

All elevations except the north have two double-hung six-over-six sash windows. Pointed hoods shelter those on the south. In the gable field is another pointed hood with a sign saying "Indian Rock Schoolhouse", giving the period of its use in smaller type. Another, smaller sign identifying the property is in the ground near the southeast corner. At the northeast and northwest corners are entrances with a glass transom. The north (rear) elevation has two large barn-style doors.

Inside the schoolhouse there are remnants of the original heating system, the flue and lower section of the brick chimney. Original low wooden wainscoting, with some initials carved into it, remains along the walls, which also have some of the original plaster and blackboards. Channels on the floor, where desks and seats were affixed to it, also remain, as do some remnants of the original vestibules in the otherwise open interior.

== History ==
The school was built around 1850, possibly slightly earlier. A decade before New York, following a broad education-reform movement of the time, had issued standard plans for a rural one-room schoolhouse with separate entrances for boys and girls to a single open room inside. Many adopted stylistic features of the early Gothic Revival movement such as steeply pitched roofs and board-and-batten siding, as reflected in a popular 1870 pattern book.

Amenia built 12 such schools around the town. The one on Mygatt Road acquired the name "Indian Rock" from a nearby lookout supposedly used by the area's Native American tribes. Notwithstanding what is believed to be its construction date, its existence is first mentioned in an 1884 deed for the sale of the property. It is not known if it had a separate lot then as it does now; however such subdivisions were a common practice for schools in upstate New York at the time.

In 1927 the school was closed as districts began to consolidate into larger, more permanent schools. It would later be used for storage in the 1950s, when the rear barn doors were added. The building was neglected throughout the remainder of the 20th century, and at the time of its listing on the National Register the windows had been boarded up.

Shortly before then, it had been acquired by the president of the local historical society, who donated it to the Webutuck Schoolhouse Association of Maplebrook School. That organization has been able to raise enough funds to restore it to its current condition by 2004. It is the only one of the 12 schools built in Amenia to remain largely intact from its original construction.

The association has published a newsletter and maintains a blog of oral history of the school from former students, now mostly senior citizens. It now has over a hundred members. Maplebrook School has used the building for community service projects for its students. It continues to host events in conjunction with local public schools, such as an Arbor Day picnic and Summer Sundays. Students from local day care centers have even had classes in the building, using slates and other period equipment.

== See also ==
- National Register of Historic Places listings in Dutchess County, New York
