= Main Street–Albertson Street–Park Place Historic District =

Historic district in New York, United States

- U.S. National Register of Historic Places
- U.S. Historic district
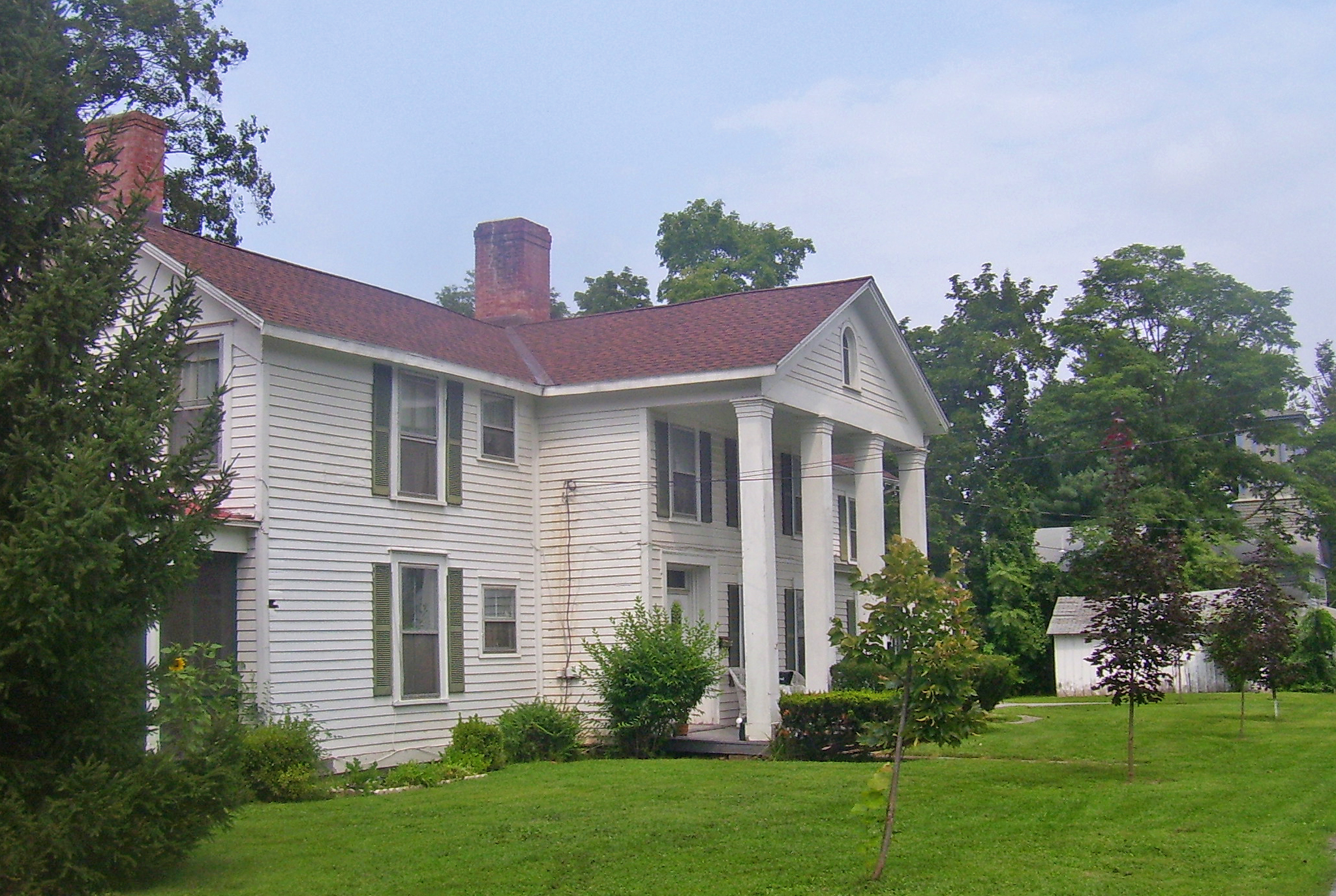
- Former St. James rectory and Baptist Church on Park Place, 2008

- Location within New York Location within the United States

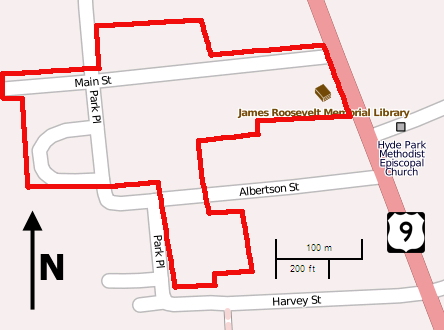
- Map of district
- Location: Hyde Park, NY
- Nearest city: Poughkeepsie
- Coordinates: 41°47′24″N 73°56′14″W
- Area: 6.8 acres (2.8 ha)
- Built: 1840–1927
- Architectural style: Federal, Italianate, Greek Revival
- NRHP reference No.: 93000856
- Added to NRHP: 1993

The Main Street–Albertson Street–Park Place Historic District is located in the residential neighborhood just west of US 9 near central Hyde Park, New York, United States. It is a predominantly residential area of 6.8 acres (2.8 ha) along the named streets, also including Hyde Park's library and a few former church buildings since converted into houses.

Its buildings were the core of Hyde Park in the 19th century, before later development and expansion shifted the center of Hyde Park to its current location just to the northeast. Many are in their original condition. In 1993 it was recognized as a historic district and added to the National Register of Historic Places.

== Geography ==
The irregularly-shaped district boundaries are mostly lot lines and streets. It begins at the intersection of Main Street and Route 9, including all buildings fronting on Main for the two blocks west to Park Place. All the buildings on Park between Main and Albertson streets to the south are included, as well as some buildings at the west end of Albertson.

This includes 36 buildings and structures in all, only six of which are not considered contributing properties to the district. Most of them are frame houses and their outbuildings built between 1840 and 1860, a time of slow transition between the Federal and Greek Revival architectural styles at the vernacular level.

The most significant exception is the newest contributing property, the James Roosevelt Memorial Library at 2 Main Street, constructed of fieldstone in 1927 at the behest of Roosevelt's son Franklin, since his family made the donation that allowed for its construction. Buildings at 15 and 19 Park Place are the former Baptist Church and St. James Rectory, dating to the late 1840s. Across the street, 20 Park was likewise once a Methodist parsonage.

== History ==
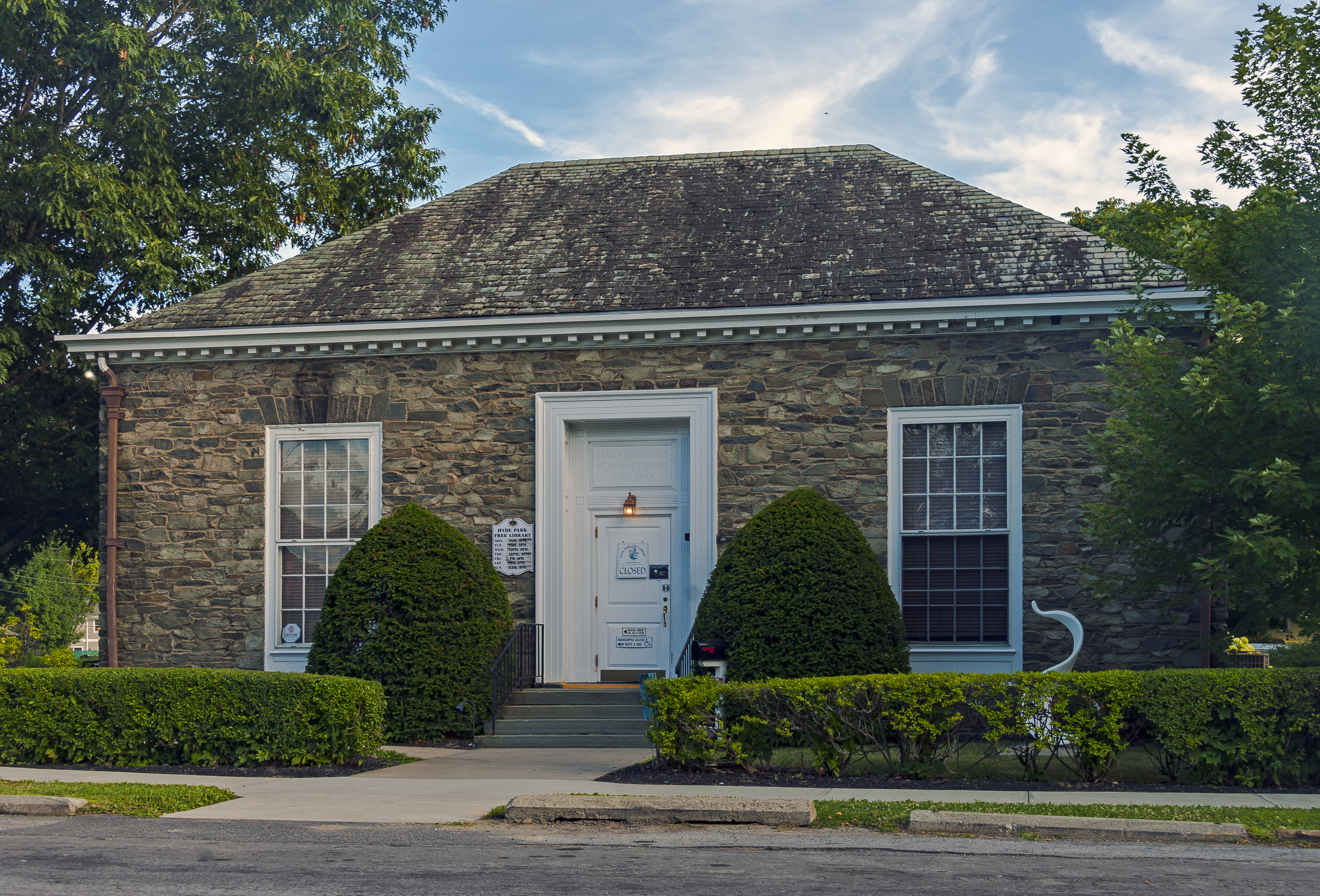
The 1927 Hyde Park Free Library, the newest contributing property in the district

The area north of Poughkeepsie along the east bank of the Hudson was known as Hyde Park as early as the 1730s, but remained largely unsettled until the 1760s, when the first large estates that were initially used as summer residences were established. By the end of the century, both the present center of Hyde Park and Staatsburg had been established.

Hyde Park became a town in 1821. Fifteen years later, in 1836, Main Street established itself as a short route between what was then the Albany Post Road and today's Market Street. A hundred lots were subdivided, and by 1858 maps show a thriving community with churches, houses and businesses in the area of the present historic district. Most of their owners were local businessmen and craftsmen. Later, the influence of large estate-owning families like the Roosevelts and Vanderbilts grew to the point they played a major role in the local economy, and their workers resided in the houses. This culminated in 1927 with the Roosevelt Library's construction.

Most homes in the district were built in a modest Greek Revival style, three bays wide rather than the customary five, since the lots were narrow. Later on, in the late 1860s, two houses had mansard roofs added, in keeping with the Second Empire style growing in popularity at the time.

In the 20th century, the rise of the estates, the growth the area experienced after Franklin Roosevelt became President and spent his vacations in the area and the rise of the automobile changed the geography of downtown Hyde Park. Main Street was still unpaved in the 1930s; at that time Roosevelt spearheaded the construction of the new post office at the crossroads of what was now Route 9 and Market, where it joined a new firehouse. The center of the town shifted to that junction, northeast of the old downtown. The buildings of what had historically been Hyde Park remained largely untouched, with a few modern additions to the neighborhood in the later decades of the century.

== See also ==
- National Register of Historic Places listings in Dutchess County, New York
