= Bergh–Stoutenburgh House =

Historic house in New York, United States

- U.S. National Register of Historic Places
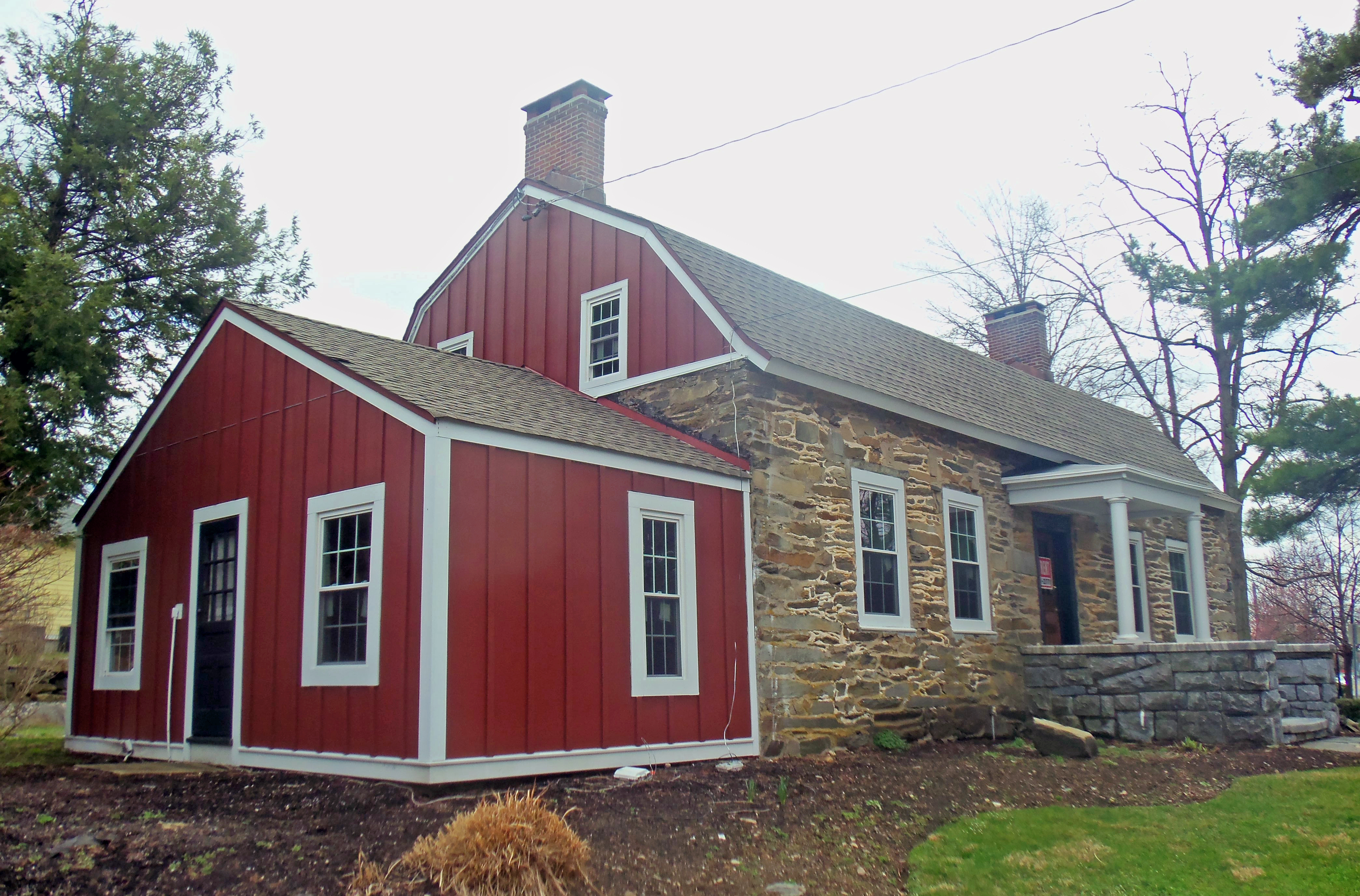
- North profile and west (front) elevation, 2013

- Location within New York Location within the United States
- Location: Hyde Park, New York
- Nearest city: Poughkeepsie
- Coordinates: 41°46′55″N 73°55′55″W
- Built: 1770s
- Architectural style: Dutch Colonial
- NRHP reference No.: 72000829
- Added to NRHP: 1972

The Bergh–Stoutenburgh House is located on U.S. Route 9 opposite Mansion Drive in Hyde Park, New York. It is currently used as a district office by state senator Sue Serino.

== Description and history ==
Built before the Revolutionary War, it is one of only two remaining Dutch Colonial stone houses in Hyde Park. It is a five-by-two-bay one-story building with a slate-covered gambrel roof pierced by two brick chimneys at the gable ends. It is sided in uncoursed fieldstone, with clapboard on the gable ends.

Two small frame wings project from the north and east (rear). An arched doorway on the south leads to the cellar. The main entrance has a flat-roofed wooden portico.

John Bergh inherited the lands from his father Christian in the years before the Revolution, along with his brother-in-law Martin Dop. Both of them built houses on them sometime between 1771 and 1780, as they appear on a map of the Albany Post Road (later to become Route 9 through Hyde Park) drawn by Robert Erskine, Surveyor-General of the Continental Army, in the last years of his life, between 1778 and 1780.

In 1788 Bergh sold a hundred acres (40 ha) to Jacobus Stoutenburgh II. His daughter Margaret, in turn, eventually inherited the property. It remained in use as a house throughout the 19th century and into much of the 20th. It was still a residence when it was listed on the National Register of Historic Places in 1972, the first property in Hyde Park listed on the Register in its own right. At some point since it was converted into Edo Sushi. The restaurant heavily remodeled the interior in keeping with Japanese dining traditions, though it still retains some of the original furnishings, such as the fireplace.

== See also ==
- National Register of Historic Places listings in Dutchess County, New York
