= LaGrange District Schoolhouse =

- U.S. National Register of Historic Places
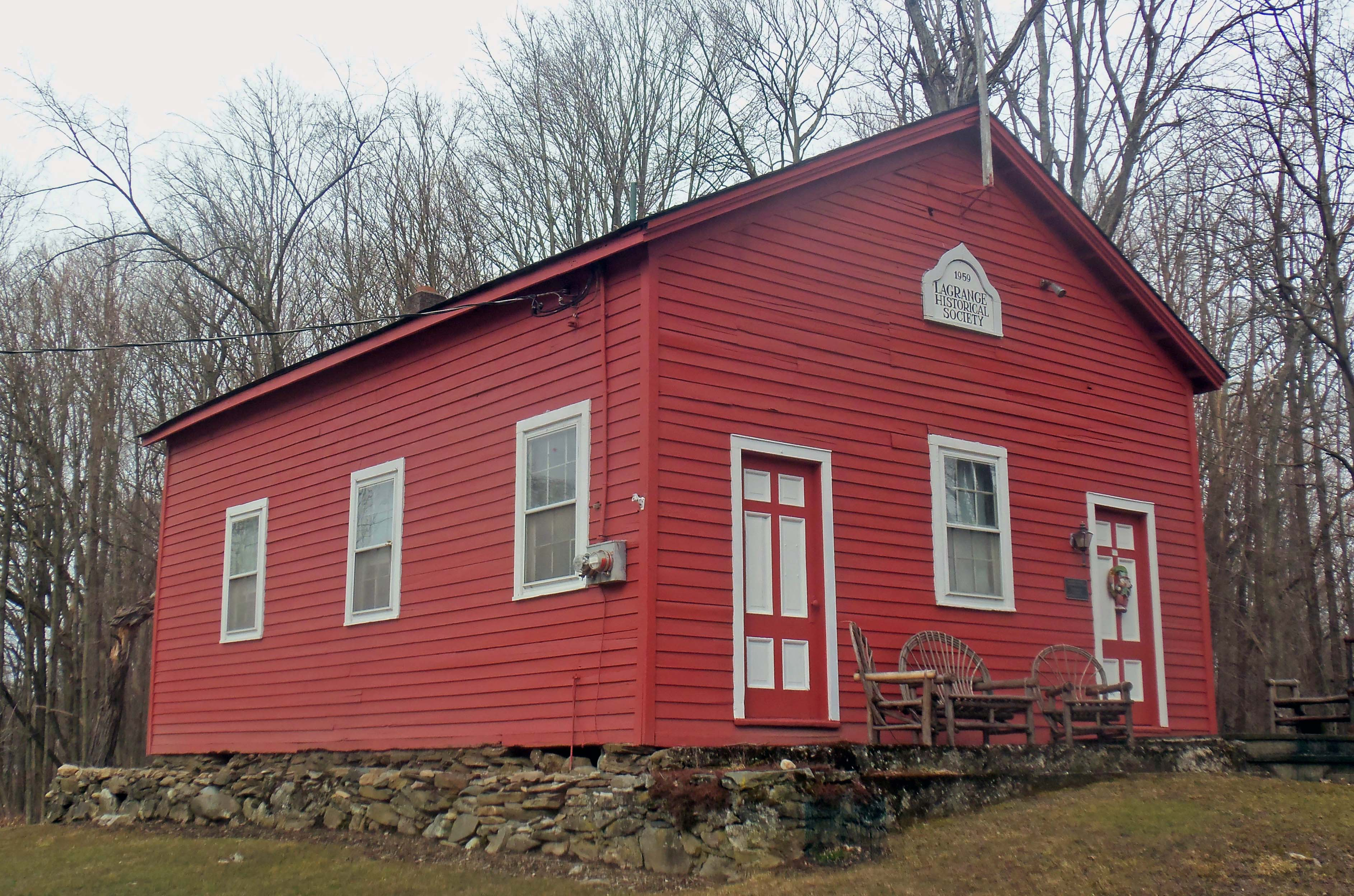
- LaGrange District Schoolhouse, March 2013

- Location within New York Location within the United States
- Location: 2 Dr. Fink Rd., Freedom Plains, New York
- Coordinates: 41°40′26″N 73°48′20″W
- Area: 0.59 acres (0.24 ha)
- Built: c. 1862
- NRHP reference No.: 13000328
- Added to NRHP: May 28, 2013

LaGrange District Schoolhouse is a historic one-room school located at Freedom Plains, Dutchess County, New York. It was built about 1862, and is a one-story, rectangular frame building sheathed in clapboard. It has a front gable roof and sits on a stone foundation. It ceased operation as a school in 1942, and subsequently housed a local public library in the 1970s, and is now a local history museum.

It was added to the National Register of Historic Places in 2013.

== See also ==
- National Register of Historic Places listings in Dutchess County, New York
