= St. James Chapel (Hyde Park, New York) =

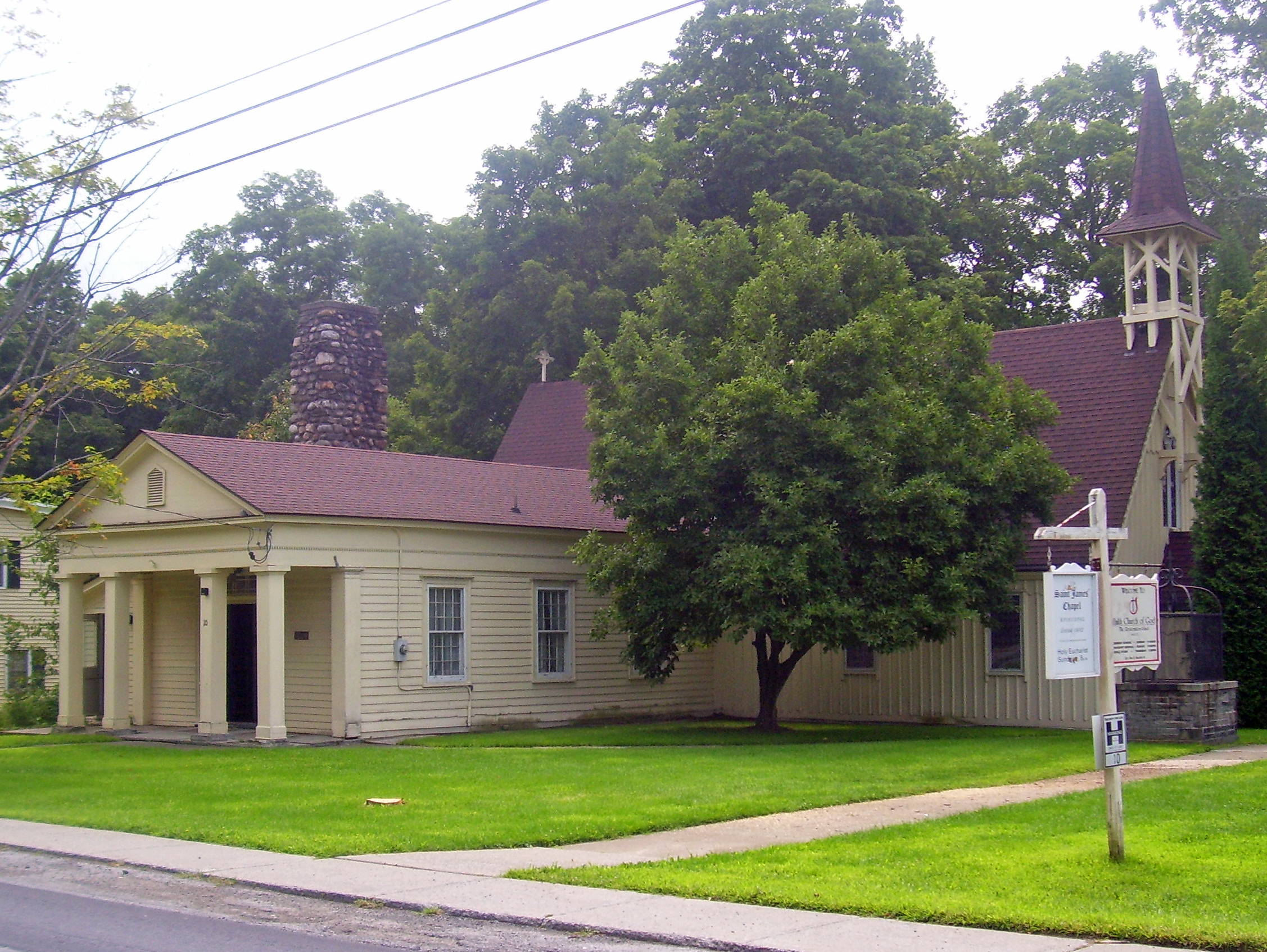
- North elevation and west profile, 2008

Religion
- Affiliation: Episcopal Church in the United States of America
- Leadership: The Rev. Chuck Kramer
- Year consecrated: 1856
- Status: chapel

Location
- Location: Hyde Park, New York, US
- Interactive map of St. James Chapel
- Coordinates: 41°47′28″N 73°56′06″W

Architecture
- Type: School building, chapel
- Style: Greek Revival, Carpenter Gothic
- Completed: 1832 (school), 1856 (chapel)

Specifications
- Direction of façade: west
- Materials: wood

U.S. National Register of Historic Places
- Added to NRHP: August 19, 1993
- NRHP Reference no.: 93000848

Website
- St. James' Church Hyde Park

St. James' Chapel is located on East Market Street (Dutchess County Route 41), a short distance east of US 9, in Hyde Park, New York, United States. It is part of the Episcopal parish of St. James, whose main church is located 1 mile (1.6 km) north of it along Route 9.

It appears to be one building today but actually consists of two buildings constructed a quarter-century apart. The Greek Revival-style school building is the church's oldest extant building. It was later used as the town's library and is still known as the Reading Room today. The chapel is a Carpenter Gothic structure with some Swedish influences that served as the main church during winter months for a century. In 1993 the combined building was listed on the National Register of Historic Places as Bard Infant School and St. James Chapel.

== Building ==
The school building, built earlier, projects north from the chapel toward the street, just southeast of the post office. It is a one-story rectangular clapboard-sided frame building. Its gabled roof is shingled in asphalt and pierced by a stone chimney on the east.

A plain dentilled cornice with wide frieze extends around the roofline. The north (front) elevation has a projecting pediment forming a portico with a round-arched attic louver in the center. It is supported by four square pillars. A shed-roofed addition is on the east profile.

The chapel, joined to the school on the latter's south, and its north, is also a one-story frame building. Unlike the school it is sided in board-and-batten with decorative scalloping at eight-foot (2.4 m) intervals. Its roof is also shingled in asphalt, but steeply pitched with a cutout rakeboard at the east and an open belfry with pointed steeple at the west, over the gabled vestibule at the main entrance.

On the east facade is a triple Gothic-arched stained glass window with a trefoil design in the arch apex, covered by a window hood. The chapel also has a shed-roofed basement entrance on its south side. A small board-and-batten gabled shed is located to the southeast. It is a contributing resource to the National Register listing.

Inside, both the chapel and school building retain much original finishing and decor. The chapel has an ornate carved tracery dividing the nave from the rest of the sanctuary. A stone Arts and Crafts-style fireplace and mantel is located in the school's main room.

== History ==
St. James was formally organized in 1811 by Samuel Bard, son of pioneering area settler and landowner John Bard. The new congregation built its church at the present site not long afterwards, near the ground where Bard and other early settlers had been buried.

In 1832 its pastor, Samuel Roosevelt Johnson, had the school built on his West Market Street property. It was the earliest school built in Hyde Park. The Greek Revival style was popular in the Hudson Valley at the time, and the original Doric columns on the front facade made the small building appear more important. The following year he retired and donated the school and the land to the church. It became known as the Bard Infant School after the church's founder.

Six years later, in 1839, the main church building was found to have serious structural flaws. It was torn down and a new building, similar in appearance, replaced it in 1844. The school building began to serve the community as not just a school, but as a circulating library. It became known around Hyde Park as the Reading Room.

In 1856, construction began on the chapel. The architect is unknown but it is similar to patterns found in a book by Richard Upjohn. It was used for daily services, and Sunday services in winter, because it was heated while the main church could not be at the time.

A new school was constructed on nearby Albertson Street in 1869, freeing the original building to remain in use as a library. In the early 1900s it was renovated. The original columns were replaced with the current square ones. In 1913 the stone fireplace and chimney were added in the then-popular Arts and Crafts style.

Heating came to the main church in 1955, ending the chapel's use for winter services. It continued hosting early services on Sunday mornings until 1998, when an extensive restoration program began. No major alterations were made to either the school or church.
