= Elias Titus House =

Historic house in New York, United States

- U.S. National Register of Historic Places
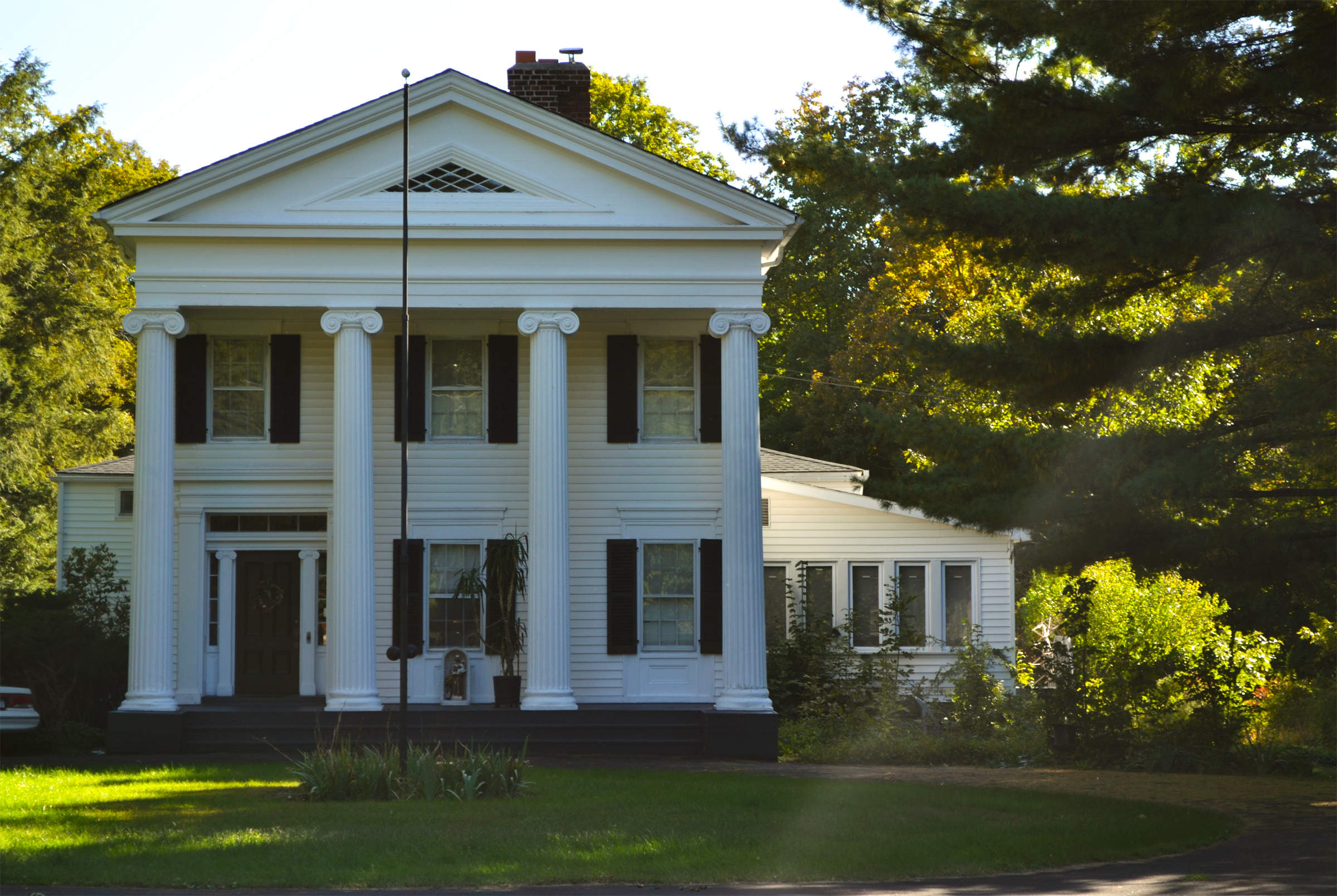
- The house in October 2015

- Location within New York Location within the United States
- Nearest city: Red Oaks Mill, New York
- Coordinates: 41°39′53″N 73°52′20″W
- Area: 3.8 acres (1.5 ha)
- Built: 1840
- Architectural style: Greek Revival
- NRHP reference No.: 06000568
- Added to NRHP: July 12, 2006

Elias Titus House is a historic home located at Red Oaks Mill in Dutchess County, New York. It was built in 1840 and originally consisted of a 2 1/2-story, gable-roofed main block and 1 1/2-story kitchen wing. The main block is three bays wide and four bays deep. It features a temple front elevation in the Greek Revival style. It is a tetrastyle portico supported by fluted Ionic order columns.

It was added to the National Register of Historic Places in 2006.
