= John H. Traver Farm =

Historic house in New York, United States

- U.S. National Register of Historic Places
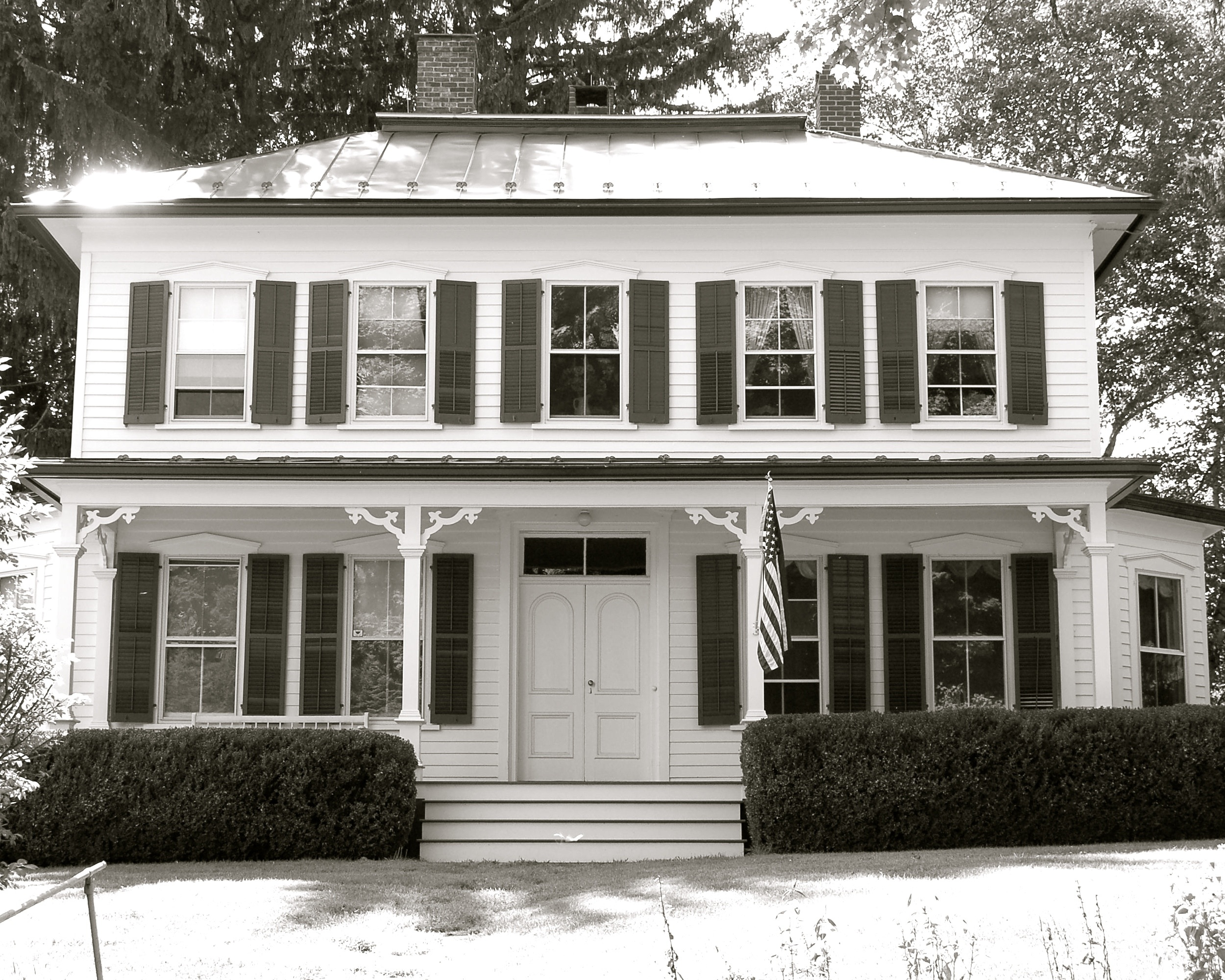

- Location within New York Location within the United States
- Location: Wurtemburg Rd., Wurtemburg, New York
- Coordinates: 41°53′40″N 73°52′3″W
- Area: 10.3 acres (4.2 ha)
- Built: 1800
- MPS: Rhinebeck Town MRA
- NRHP reference No.: 87001081
- Added to NRHP: July 9, 1987

John H. Traver Farm is a historic home and farm complex located at Württemberg in Dutchess County, New York. The main house was built about 1876 and is a two-story, five-bay, center hall frame dwelling. It is sheathed in clapboard siding and has a low pitched hipped roof with broadly projecting eaves. It features a verandah with square support posts and ornate scroll sawn knee braces. Also on the property is a Dutch barn, a carriage house, shed, and stone walls.

It was added to the National Register of Historic Places in 1987.
