= Marquardt Farm =

Historic house in New York, United States

- U.S. National Register of Historic Places
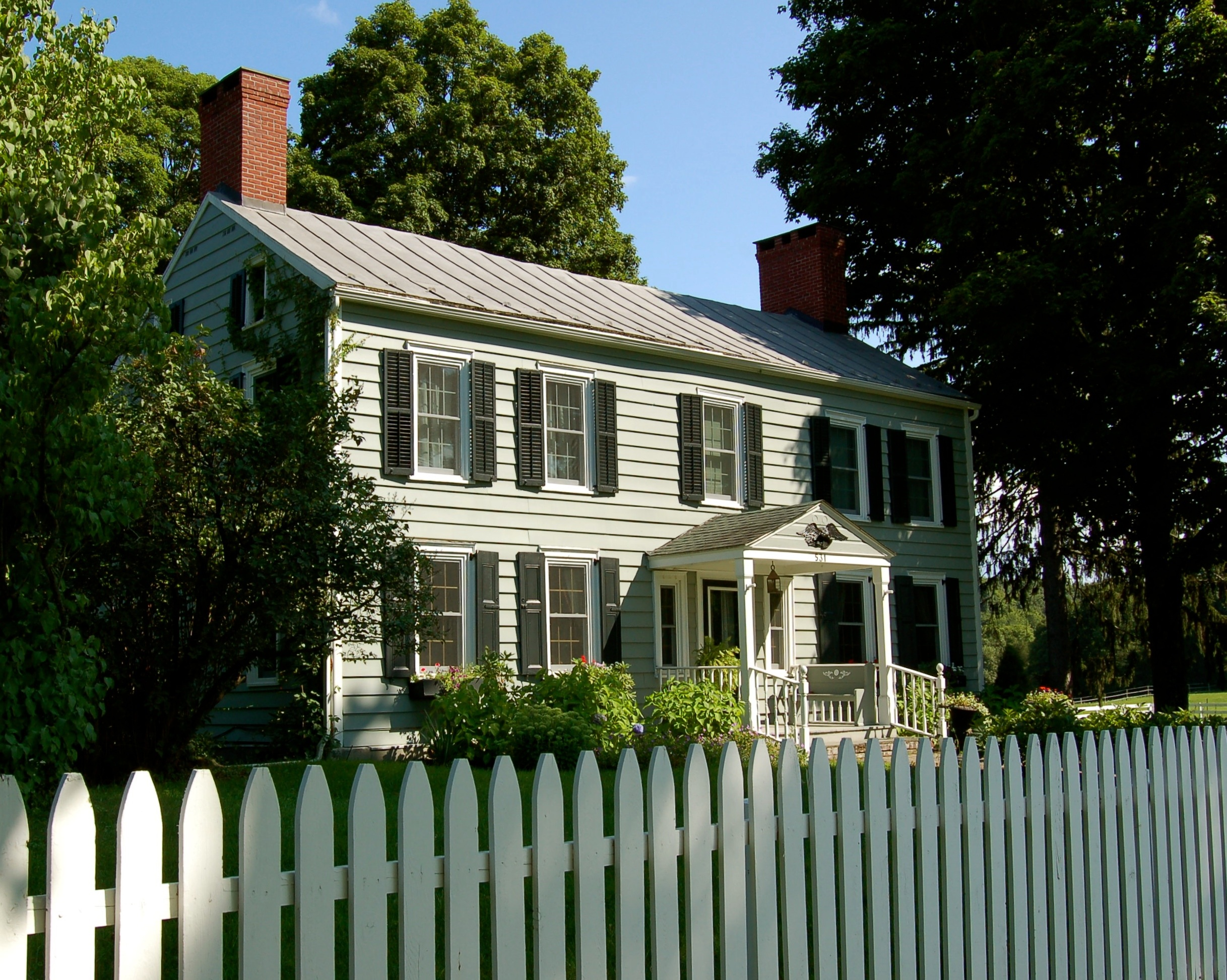

- Location within New York Location within the United States
- Nearest city: Wurtemburg, New York
- Coordinates: 41°53′9″N 73°52′6″W
- Area: 22.3 acres (9.0 ha)
- Built: ca. 1810
- Architectural style: Federal
- MPS: Rhinebeck Town MRA
- NRHP reference No.: 87001075
- Added to NRHP: July 9, 1987

Marquardt Farm is a historic home and farm complex located at Wurtemberg in Dutchess County, New York. The main house was built about 1810 and is a traditional two story, five-bay, center hall Federal style dwelling. The rectangular frame structure sits on a partially exposed stone foundation and topped by a gable roof. It has a one-story frame wing. Also on the property are three barns, a carriage house, stone walls, a machine shed, well / wellhouse, and summer kitchen. The barn group includes a large "H" frame Dutch barn and two smaller barns.

It was added to the National Register of Historic Places in 1987.
