= Pultz Farmhouse =

Historic house in New York, United States

- U.S. National Register of Historic Places
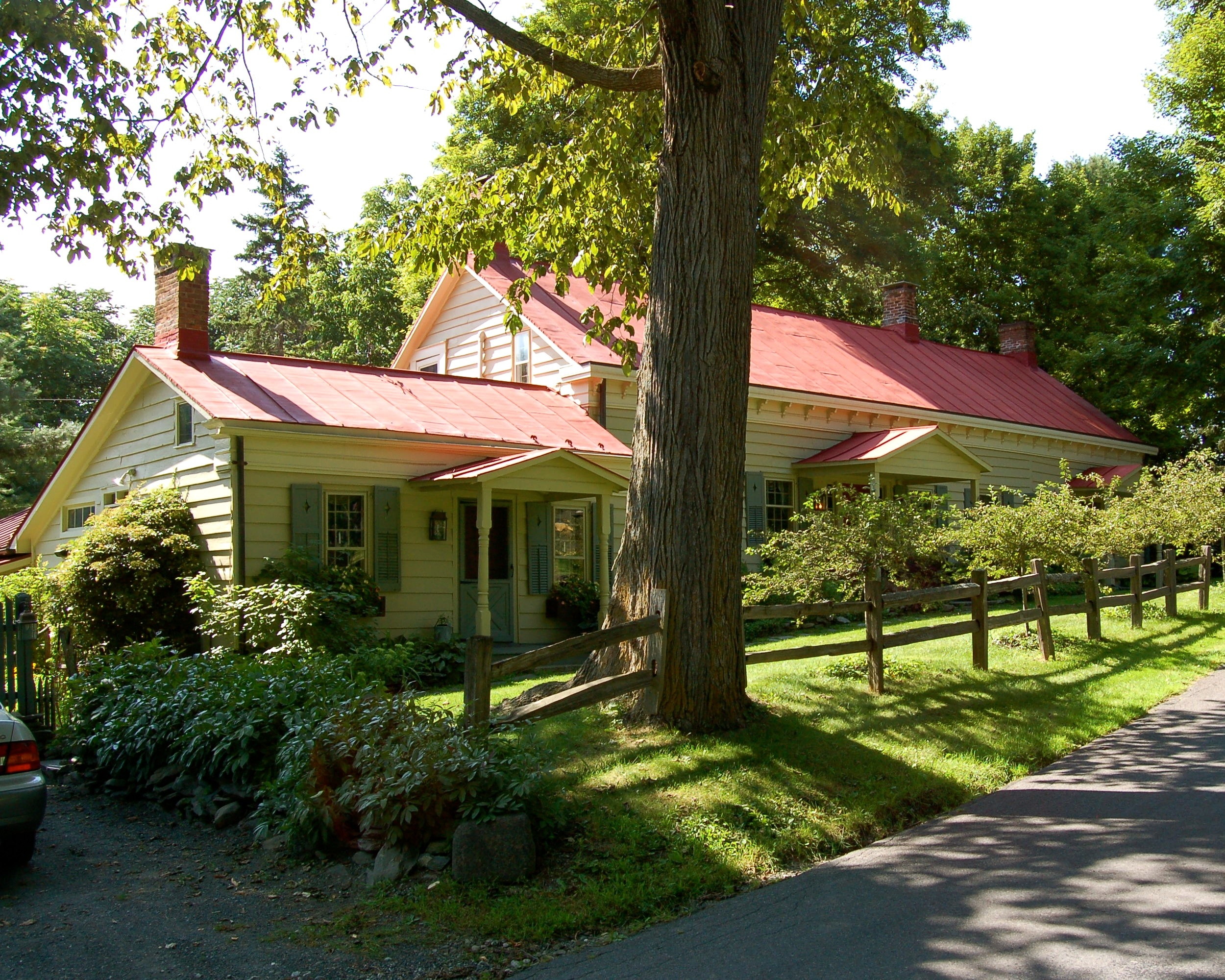

- Location within New York Location within the United States
- Nearest city: Wurtemburg, New York
- Coordinates: 41°54′2″N 73°52′4″W
- Area: 3 acres (1.2 ha)
- Built: 1750
- MPS: Rhinebeck Town MRA
- NRHP reference No.: 87001074
- Added to NRHP: July 9, 1987

Pultz Farmhouse is a historic home located at Wurtemberg in Dutchess County, New York. The house is a three part, one story rectangular dwelling. The central section dates to about 1750 and is a five bay, center hall plan building. The two bay north wing was attached about 1800. The saltbox wing was also added about 1800. Also on the property is a contributing machine shed.

It was added to the National Register of Historic Places in 1987.
