= Pulver-Bird House =

Historic house in New York, United States

- U.S. National Register of Historic Places
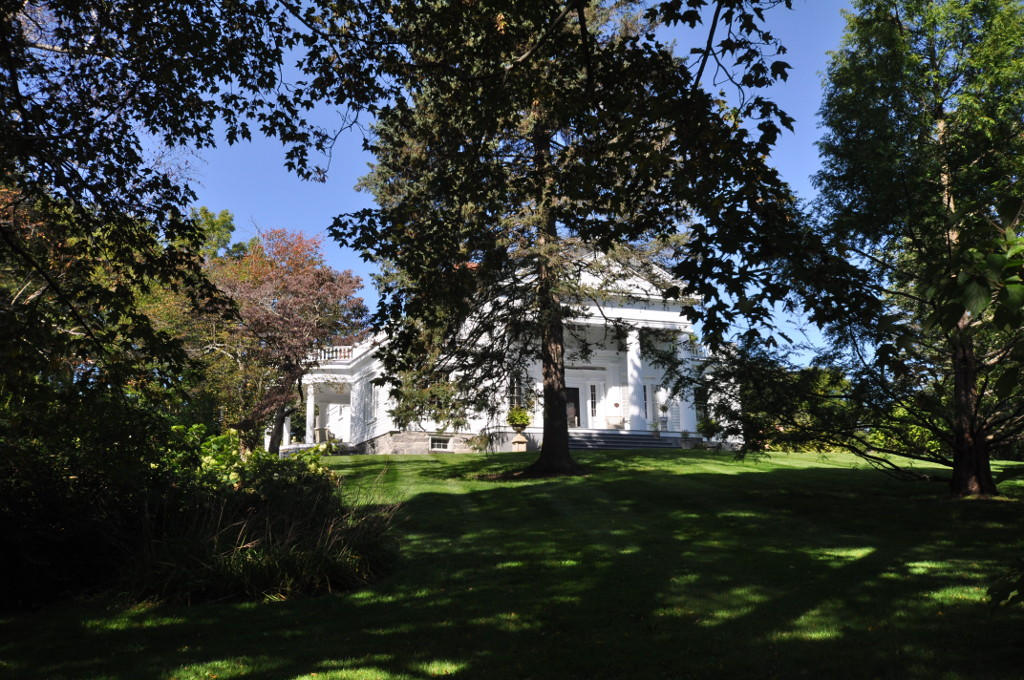

- Location within New York Location within the United States
- Location: 983 Hunns Lake Road, Stanford, New York
- Coordinates: 41°54′39.44″N 73°38′3.23″W
- Area: 19 acres (7.7 ha)
- Built: 1839
- Architect: Lockwood, Nathaniel Jr.
- Architectural style: Greek Revival
- NRHP reference No.: 08000700
- Added to NRHP: July 25, 2008

Pulver-Bird House is a historic home located at Stanford in Dutchess County, New York. It was built in 1839 and has a two-story center block with flanking one-story wings in the Greek Revival style. It features a monumental tetrastyle portico supported by four Doric order columns. Also on the property is a frame ice house and frame barn.

It was added to the National Register of Historic Places in 2008.
