= Windswept Farm =

Historic house in New York, United States

- U.S. National Register of Historic Places
- Location within New York Location within the United States
- Location: Sunset Trail, Clinton, New York
- Coordinates: 41°51′7″N 73°48′17″W
- Area: 79.6 acres (32.2 ha)
- Built: 1823
- Architect: Lyons, Amos
- NRHP reference No.: 89001390
- Added to NRHP: September 7, 1989

Windswept Farm is a historic home located at Clinton in Dutchess County, New York. The main block of the house was built about 1823 and is a Federal-style dwelling. The main block is a 2-story, five-bay timber-frame house. A 1 1/2-story gabled addition was completed about 1840. Also on the property are two barns and a cider mill.

It was added to the National Register of Historic Places in 1989.
