= Captain Moses W. Collyer House =

Historic house in New York, United States

- Capt. Moses W. Collyer House
- U.S. National Register of Historic Places
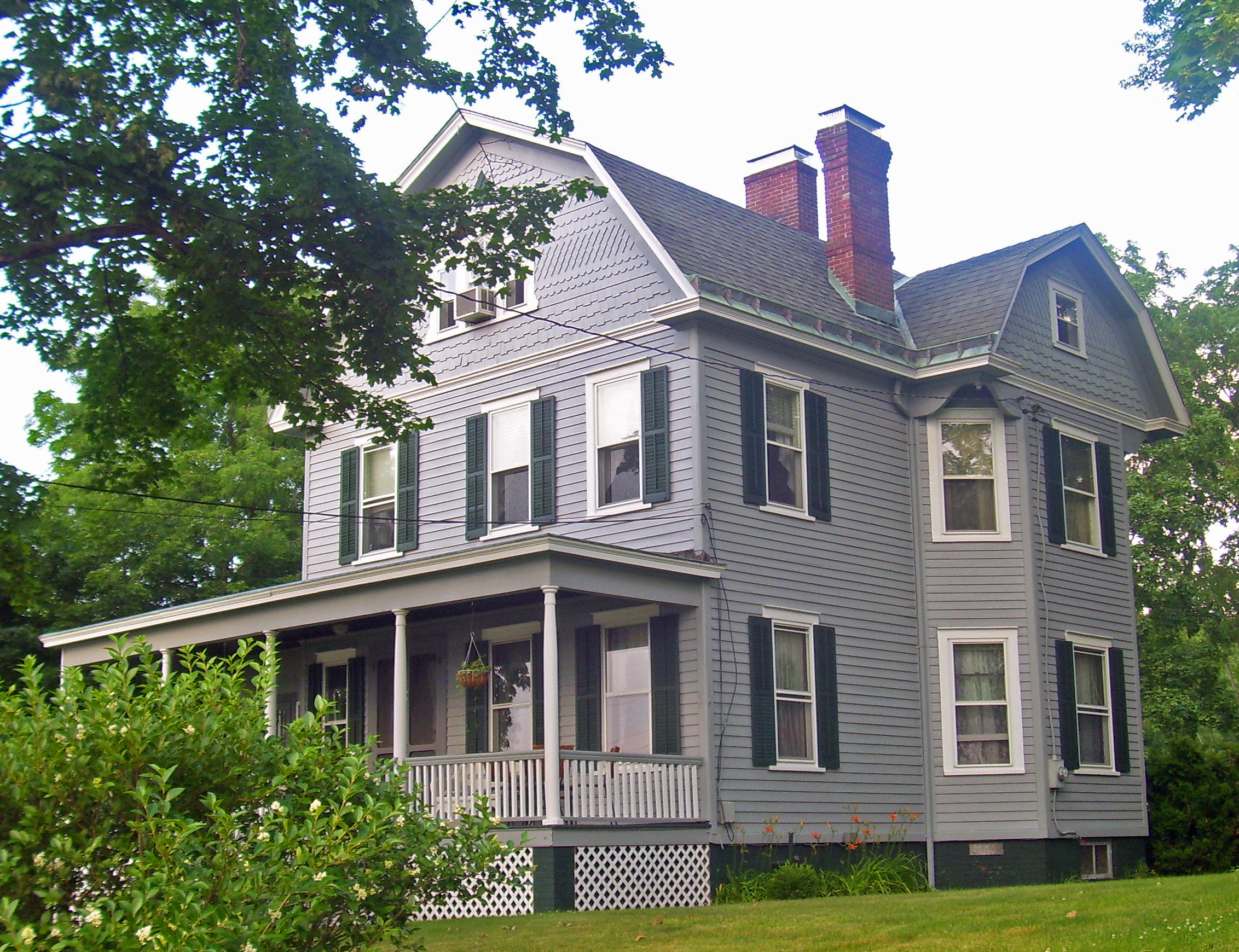
- Front (west) elevation and south profile, 2008

- Location within New York Location within the United States
- Location: Chelsea, NY
- Nearest city: Poughkeepsie
- Coordinates: 41°33′05″N 73°58′14″W
- Built: 1899
- Architectural style: Late Victorian
- MPS: Chelsea MRA
- NRHP reference No.: 87001370
- Added to NRHP: 1987

The Captain Moses W. Collyer House, also Driftwood, is located on River Road South in Chelsea, New York, United States. It was listed on the National Register of Historic Places in 1987.

It was the home of Collyer, a riverboat captain on the nearby Hudson, from 1899 until his death on September 22, 1942, as noted by New York Times. A few years after moving in, he cowrote The Sloops of the Hudson, a memoir and history of the years when sailboats were the primary means of getting up and down the river. An exhaustive and complete work that drew on Collyer's background in a riverfaring family, it is today considered the definitive history of that era and its boats.

The house itself, built just before the turn of the 20th century, is an eclectic mixture of Late Victorian styles reflecting Collyer's experience traveling the river and its port communities. It is still a private residence, and not open to the public.

== Property ==
The house overlooks the Hudson River across River Road and the railroad tracks today used by Metro-North's Hudson Line. It is a two-story frame home on a brick foundation topped by a gambrel roof. On the south side, in the brick, is a datestone reading "M.W. COLLYER/1899". The west (front) facade has four bays on the first floor behind a wraparound veranda and three on the second. Projecting bays at the rear of either side have smaller gambrel roofs.

It is sided in clapboard to the roofline, then in shingles within the gambrels, except in the rear where the clapboard continues to the top. All the gambrels contain one window, with the west facade's Palladian-style one being the most elaborate.

The porch columns are the original woodwork, tapered and turned; a simple balustrade connects them. Much of the interior is also original, including the oak staircase in the entrance hall and a marbleized mantelpiece in the parlor. The upper floor and attic are finished, and were used as bedrooms and servants' quarters originally.

There are several outbuildings, all considered contributing resources to the historic character of the property. A large clapboard garden shed with frontal cross-gable was built along with the house and follows its general design and decoration, as does a nearby wooden privy. The garage was built around 1932 by Collyer as a wedding present to his daughter, and has a wooden plaque noting this event.

== History ==
Collyer was born around 1850 in Red Hook, further upriver in Dutchess County. His father, John L. Collyer, had started out on the river from his native Ossining (then known as Sing Sing) in the 1830s. Soon John Collyer became captain and owner of a North River packet sloop that sailed from upper Red Hook Landing, now known as Tivoli, to New York City in the 1830s, and continued sailing commercially in some capacity until his death in 1889. Collyer's uncles went into the shipbuilding business and also grew wealthy.

John Collyer sailed the sloop Benjamin Franklin out of Poughkeepsie in 1865. Moses joined the sloop that year as a cabin boy. The "Benjamin Franklin" carried crockery and earthenware from Foster's Dock at Poughkeepsie in the spring and fall to ports along the Hudson. Moses continued to work in the family business until leaving for the schooner Iron Age in 1877; the following year he became the captain and owner of the Henry B. Fidderman, another schooner. Two years later he switched to steamers as captain of the Henrietta Collyer, built in Nyack for the river's iron and limestone trade.

Captain Collyer also acquired the sloop Mohican, built in 1837 at Peekskill, and had her sunk in front of his house to serve as a breakwater and dock. The "spine" of the Mohican can be sometimes be seen south of the Chelsea Yacht Club, especially at low water.

Members of the Collyer family, including Moses, had lived in Chelsea since 1868, although it is not known where. In 1899, nearing retirement as the New York Central Railroad's lines up the river had supplanted navigation in the Hudson Valley, Collyer built the house. Detailed records kept during its construction, including photos at different stages of the process and receipts for construction materials, survive to this day and are a useful record of turn-of-the-century building practices.

A few years later, Collyer and William Verplanck, the scion of a wealthy family in the area and a boat owner himself, collaborated on The Sloops of the Hudson, a history of the sail era on the river. Collyer's detailed recollections of the ships and people he had known over the years made the book's second half, which he wrote, the essential resource on the subject as there is no other record so comprehensive.

Other than the construction of the garage, there have been few other alterations to the house. The porch steps have been rebuilt and a handrail added. The porch itself has been enclosed.

== Aesthetics ==
The house represents a mix of styles, waxing and waning, in a fashion popular during the last years of the 19th century. The irregular, yet compact, massing of the main forms and mixture of materials are characteristic of the Queen Anne style, then reaching its final stages. In contrast, the gambrel roof and Palladian window show the emergence of the Colonial Revival, a style that would become widespread in the first decades of the new century. Its overall generic style demonstrates architectural trends moving out of their original contexts and the integration of Chelsea with the larger economy.

Inside, the house reflects changing tastes as well. The interior's rooms are less grand than most earlier Victorian homes, suggesting a space meant for living as opposed to entertaining, and the more open placement of the kitchen and other backrooms suggest a more egalitarian attitude than a strictly Victorian home would. The contrast between the values of the Queen Anne style and the Colonial Revival is also represented by the marbleized mantelpiece and unpainted oak stair respectively.
