= Hyde Park Firehouse =

- U.S. National Register of Historic Places
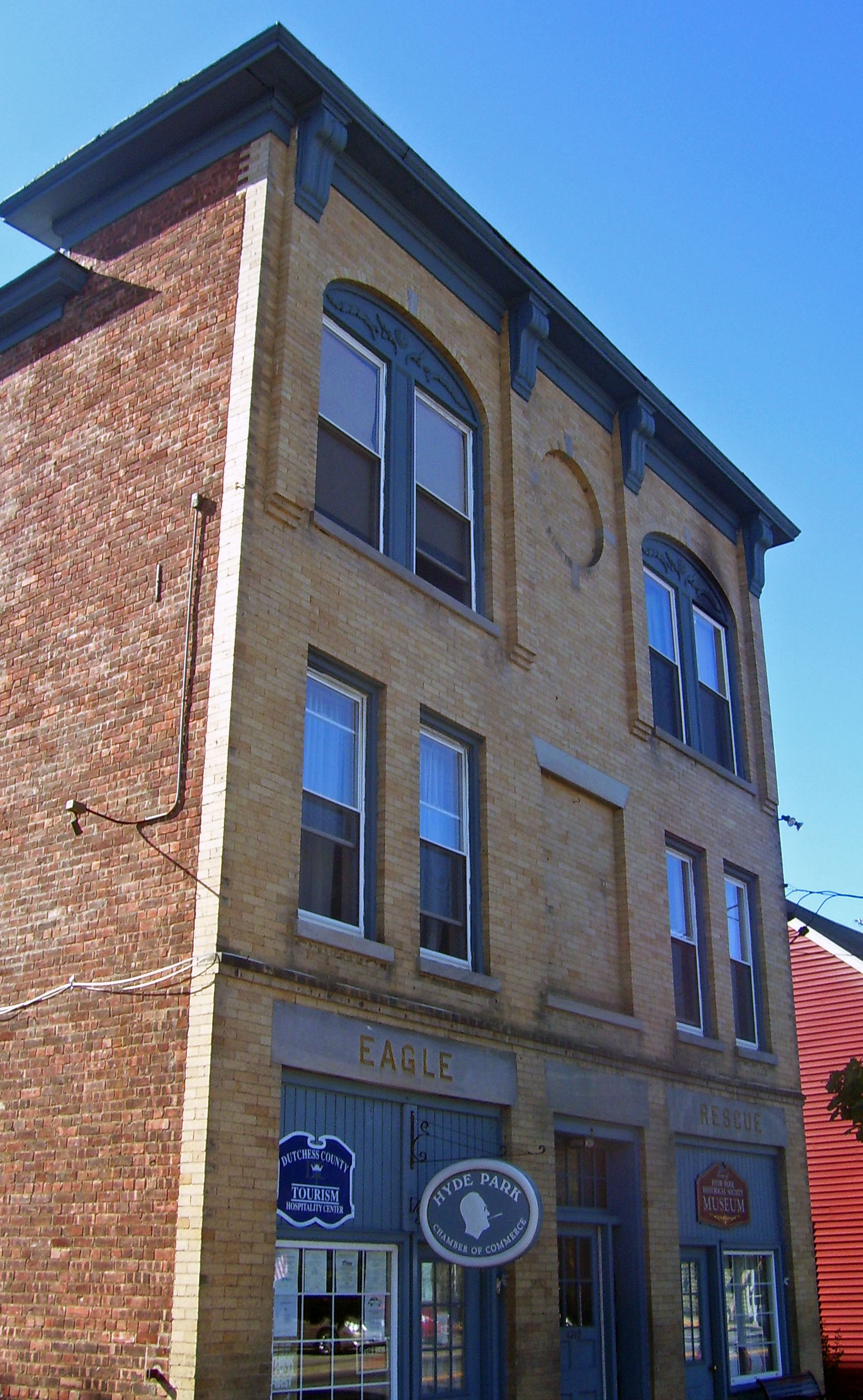
- Firehouse in 2007

- Location within New York Location within the United States
- Location: Hyde Park, NY
- Nearest city: Poughkeepsie
- Coordinates: 41°47′28″N 73°56′11″W
- Area: less than one acre
- Built: 1902
- Architect: Beardsley, William J.; O'Donnell, John
- Architectural style: Renaissance
- NRHP reference No.: 93000859
- Added to NRHP: September 2, 1993

The Hyde Park Firehouse is located along U.S. Route 9 in Hyde Park, New York. It was built in 1902 as the headquarters for the Eagle Engine and Rescue fire company, which later became part of the Hyde Park Fire Department and moved to newer quarters a block further up Route 9. Architects John O'Donnell and William J. Beardsley designed the building in a Renaissance Revival architectural style. It was added to the National Register of Historic Places in 1993.

The building currently serves as a local history museum for the Town of Hyde Park Historical Society. The historical society's museum there is open from June through October on Saturdays and Sundays, with a collection from the townspeople including historical items like the voting machine used by Roosevelt in 1932 when he ran against Herbert Hoover.
