= Benjamin C. Tousey House =

Historic house in New York, United States

- U.S. National Register of Historic Places
- Location within New York Location within the United States
- Location: Jct. of Salt Point Tpk. and Schultzville Rd., Clinton, New York
- Coordinates: 41°50′3″N 73°45′58″W
- Area: 13 acres (5.3 ha)
- Built: 1914
- Architectural style: Bungalow/Craftsman
- NRHP reference No.: 94001002
- Added to NRHP: August 19, 1994

Benjamin C. Tousey House, also known as "The Willows," is a historic home located at Clinton in Dutchess County, New York. The property includes six contributing buildings and one contributing structures. They are the main house, a stone cottage with garage in the basement, a stone garage, a frame lodge, two frame sheds, and a gazebo. The main house was built in 1914-1915 and is a compactly designed, two story rectangular house with arelatively low pitched roof. The ground floor is clad in wood shingles and the upper floor in stucco and half timbers. It features a complex arrangement of balconies and terraces and is representative of the American Craftsman style.

It was added to the National Register of Historic Places in 1994.
