= Oswego Meeting House and Friends' Cemetery =

Historic site in Dutchess County, New York, US

- U.S. National Register of Historic Places
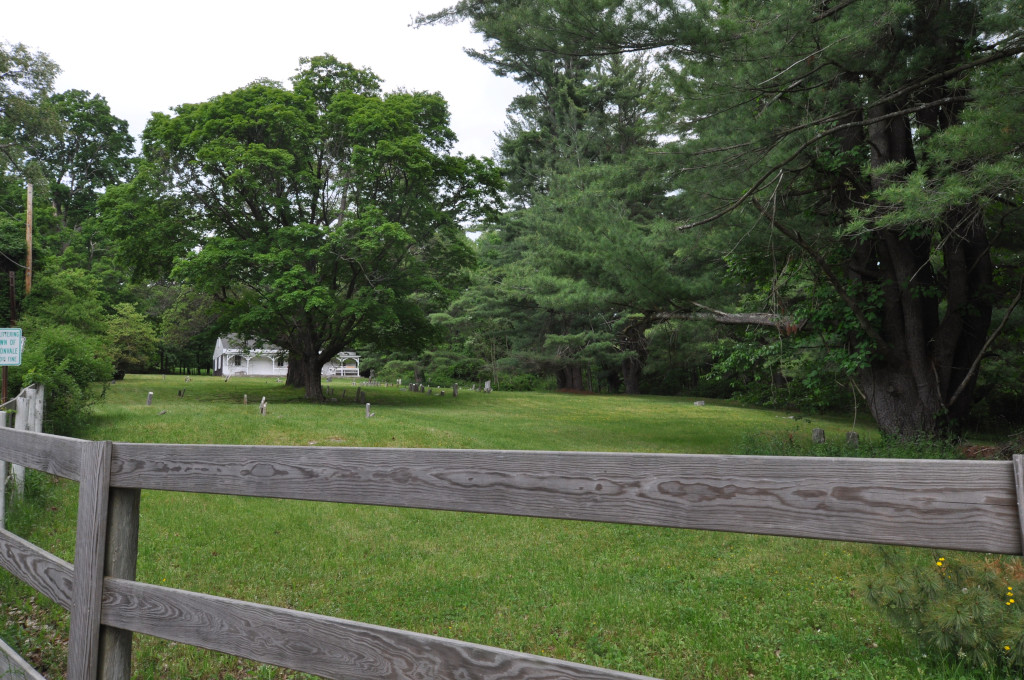

- Location within New York Location within the United States
- Location: Oswego Rd. at jct. with Smith Rd., Moore's Mill, New York
- Coordinates: 41°42′10″N 73°43′46″W
- Area: 1.9 acres (0.77 ha)
- Built: 1790
- MPS: Dutchess County Quaker Meeting Houses TR
- NRHP reference No.: 89000301
- Added to NRHP: April 27, 1989

Oswego Meeting House and Friends' Cemetery is a historic Society of Friends meeting house and cemetery in Moore's Mill, Dutchess County, New York. It was built in 1790 and is a 1 1/2-story frame building sided with clapboards and wooden shingles. It has a moderately pitched gable roof and two entrances on the front facade, each flanked by two windows. The cemetery contains about 50 stones and burials range in date from the 1790s to 1880s. Also on the property is a privy.

It was listed on the National Register of Historic Places in 1989.
