= Beekman Park =

Park in New York, United States

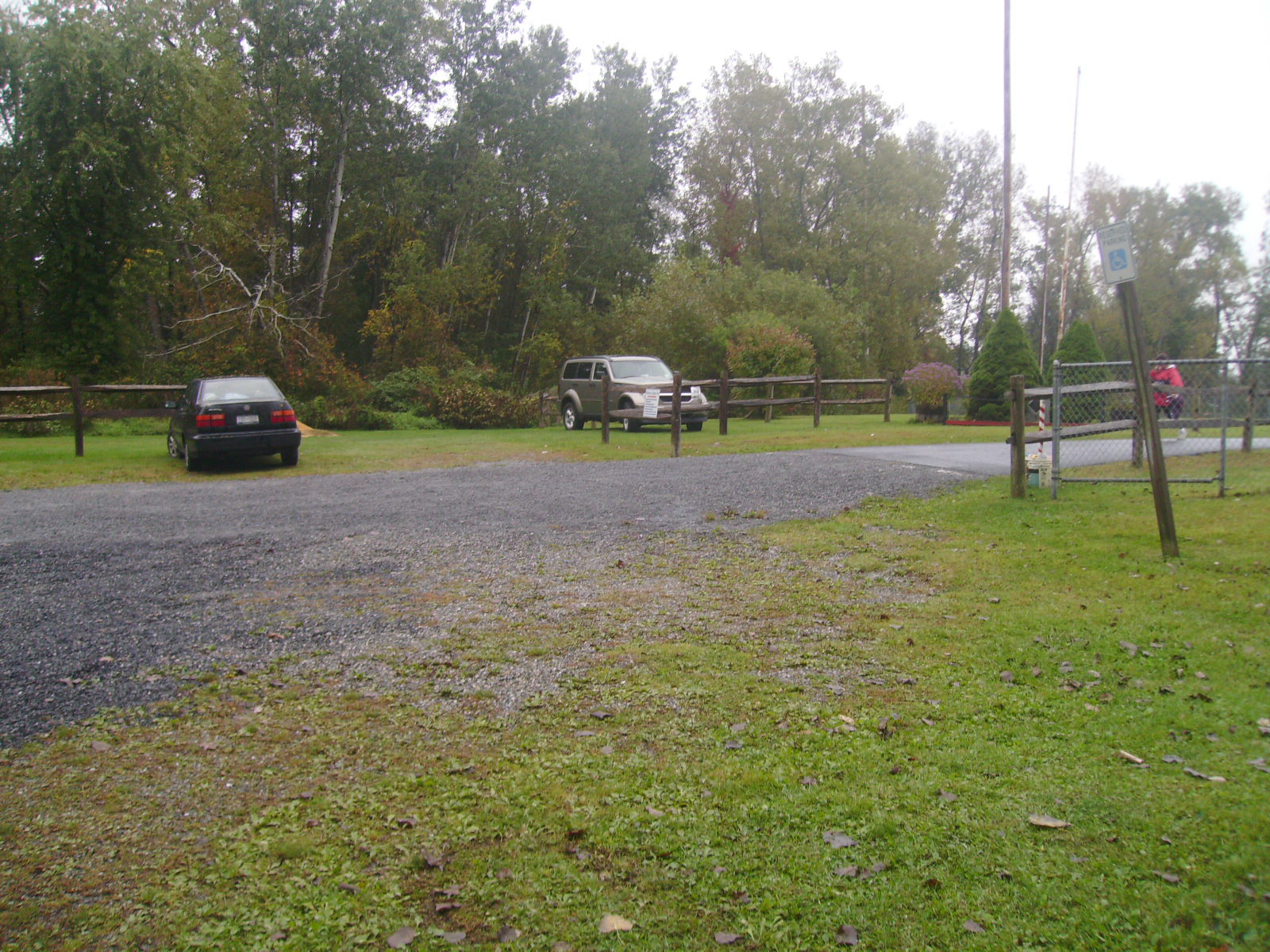
- The northern entrance to Beekman Park from U.S. Route 44.
- Interactive map of Beekman Park
- Type: Local park
- Location: Amenia (CDP), New York
- Coordinates: 41.845°N 73.562°W
- Area: 47.7 acres (19.3 ha)
- Created: 1983-1985
- Operator: Amenia Department of Public Works
- Open: All year
- Parking: 75 spaces

Beekman Park is a small local park in the census-designated place of Amenia, part of Dutchess County, New York. It is located on U.S. Route 44 and is visible off New York State Route 22 and New York State Route 343.

In 1974, the land upon which the park is located was sold to the Town of Amenia by Walter Beekman for the sum of $1. The park was officially opened in 1983. Before the park existed, it was the site of Lake Amenia, formed in the 1920s by a freshwater dam over a sawmill pond at the intersection of Lake Amenia Road and West Lake Amenia Road. The dam's original use was to power a nearby saw mill where, with the new lake in place, people now had the opportunity to swim. During the 1920s, the lake became surrounded by cottages, pavilions, docks, and some railings.

Lake Amenia remained intact for another 30 years, however, in 1955, Hurricane Diane struck the area and eradicated any trace of the lake. The storm's heavy rains caused the lake's water gates to fail. The resulting flood drained the lake. This area is now part of the New York State Wetlands. In 1974, the land that makes up the park, including the remains of the lake, now the wetlands, were sold to the Town of Amenia for a single dollar, by Walter Beekman. Groups of volunteers began construction on the park, which included ball fields. The park officially opened in 1983, with the first Little League games being played on one of their fields, with two more fields soon after. The park remains in active use to this date.

== History of Lake Amenia ==
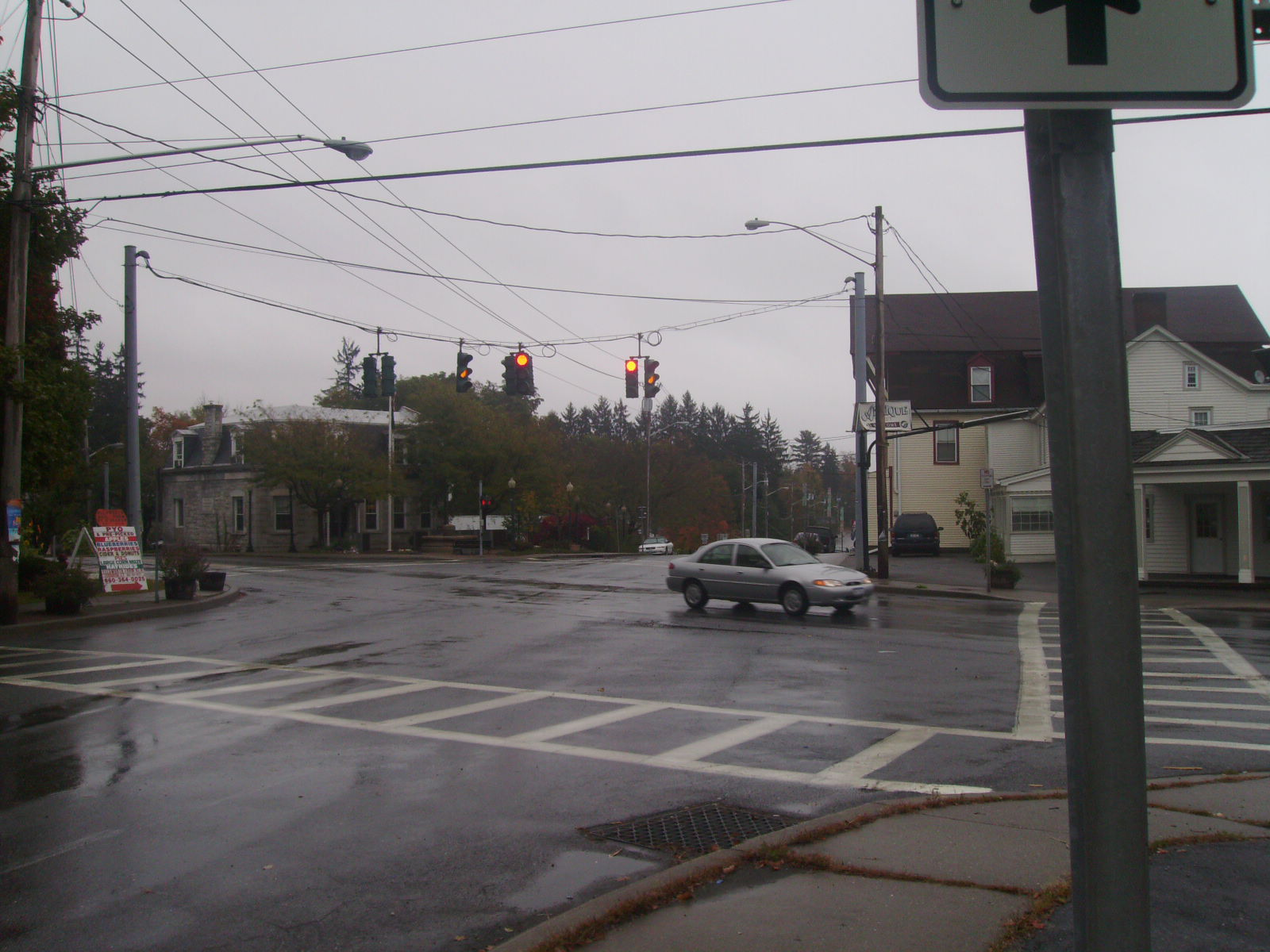
Main intersection in Amenia of routes 22 and 343, near the northern edge of where Lake Amenia used to sit.

On the site of Beekman Park was the former Lake Amenia, a shallow, one and a half acre-wide freshwater lake in the center of Amenia. The lake first originated as a millpond for a local corn and grain mill in the area. Eventually, the mill changed over to a sawmill, and during the 1920s, a dam was built in the millpond, creating Lake Amenia. The lake had two streams that flowed water in and out of the body. One ran near the local pizzeria and one ran near the current-day tennis courts. The freshwater lake became an instant tourist destination two hours north of New York City. People took advantage of the lake, including Beekman and Beekman Inc., a tourist agency developed by two brothers. They used the area around Lake Amenia to develop theaters and a living environment. The lake even had a cemetery built in one of the islands, which exists to this date as Amenia Island Cemetery. People would come to the lake for vacationing, which included a pool hall in the post office, beaches, and even a brand new golf course. Summer vacationers would take the train to Amenia Station on the New York Central Railroad to visit the lakeside resorts and summer camps on the lake.

As popular as the community had become, there were no doubts that the end of vacationing in Amenia would soon imminent. In 1955, during the destruction left by Hurricane Diane swept through New York and Pennsylvania, the dam on Lake Amenia burst. Local folklore claims the floodgates to open Lake Amenia's dam were supposed to be opened for the high waters. However, the dam keeper dropped his keys into the rushing waters of Lake Amenia, and the resulting outflow caused a catastrophe.

The flooding overtook much of the community, including the golf course, and although the flooding receded, the dam was never repaired. The community could not adapt to the sweeping changes from flooding and the popular community became an economic ghost town. Locals reported that the once busy streets of Amenia became empty storefronts. Much of the lake drained into wetlands, some of which has been adaptive into the Wassaic portion of the New York State Wetlands. People often would comment that Lake Amenia Road, named after the lake on the southern side of Beekman Park, served no lake.

== Currently ==
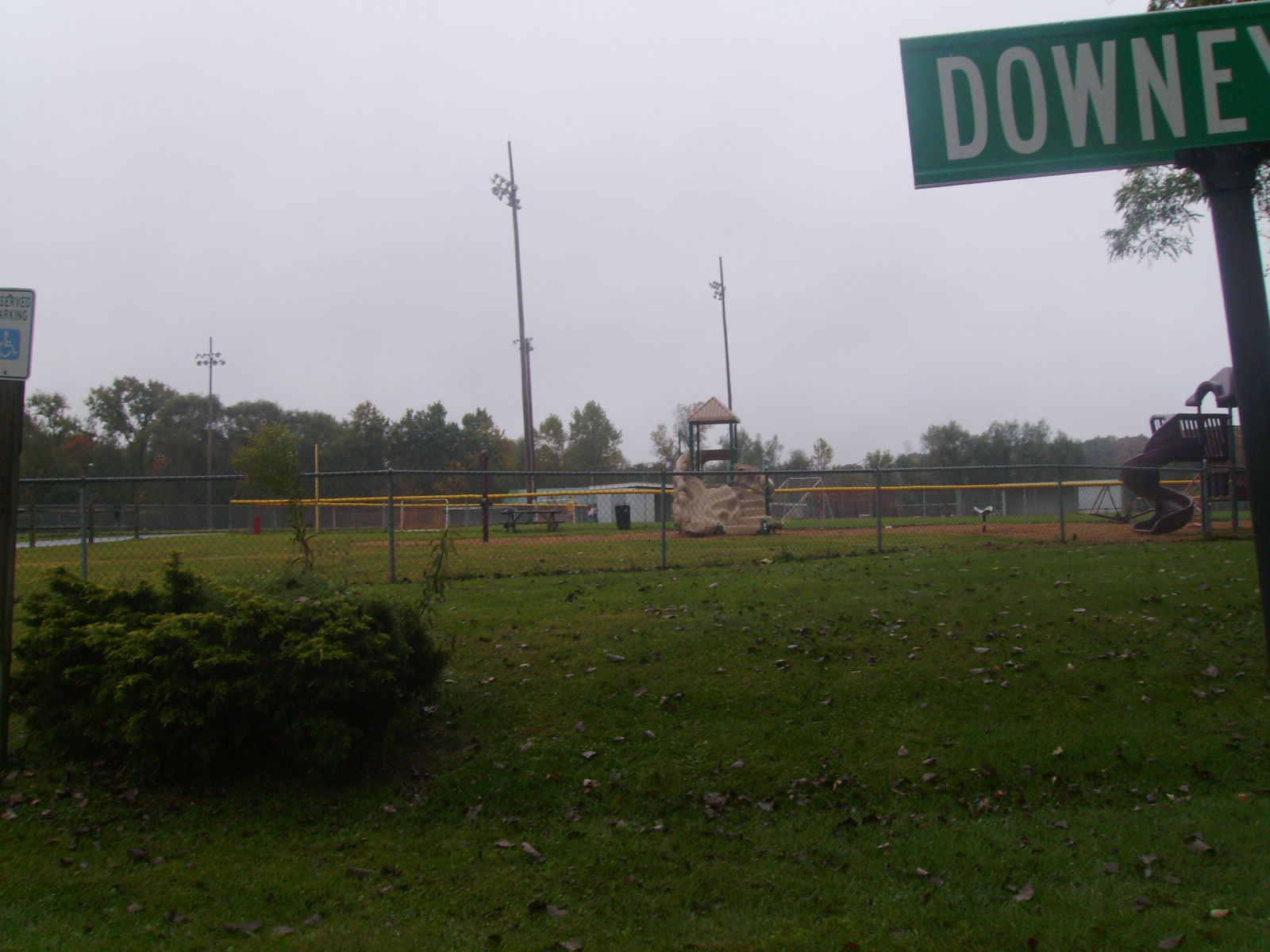
The fields at Beekman Park, the ball fields are important in Amenia

After the flooding of Hurricane Diane, the former wetlands became the ownership of Walter Beekman from Beekman and Beekman Inc. He kept ownership of the land for only nineteen years before selling the land to the town of Amenia in 1974 for one dollar. The land remained unkept at that point, until the 1980s, when groups of volunteers (funded by the town) started installing ball fields and park like scenery. In 1983, Beekman Park was open for business as the new local park. In 1985, the local baseball fields started hosting their own games for locals team on the local Don Herring Field. Some of the former lake remains, including a portion of the former dam in the southwestern corner of the park, and Amenia Island Cemetery still stands along New York State Route 343 towards Sharon, Connecticut, but on stable ground. On May 14, 2009, the town of Amenia secured $3,829 (2009 USD) from their recreation fund to help make improvements to Beekman Park, and on June 11, 2009, the money distribution was approved.

The park is made up mainly of three baseball and softball fields. The three fields are named after famous players in Amenia, including one named for William "Doc" Bartlett, which was opened in 1985. There are some undeveloped parts, with a house running along the northern edge of the park. At the northeast corner, there is a remnant of the old dam that impounded former Lake Amenia. There are two ways to access Beekman Park, one by foot and one by car. The first is on U.S. Route 44, where the parking lot (which holds approximately 75 cars), is located. The second, a pedestrian entrance, is at Broadway and East Broadway Avenues.

== See also ==
- Beth David Synagogue (Amenia, New York)
- Lakes of New York
- Amenia (CDP), New York
