= Troy Savings Bank Music Hall =

Historic commercial building in New York, United States

- U.S. National Register of Historic Places
- U.S. National Historic Landmark
- U.S. Historic district – Contributing property
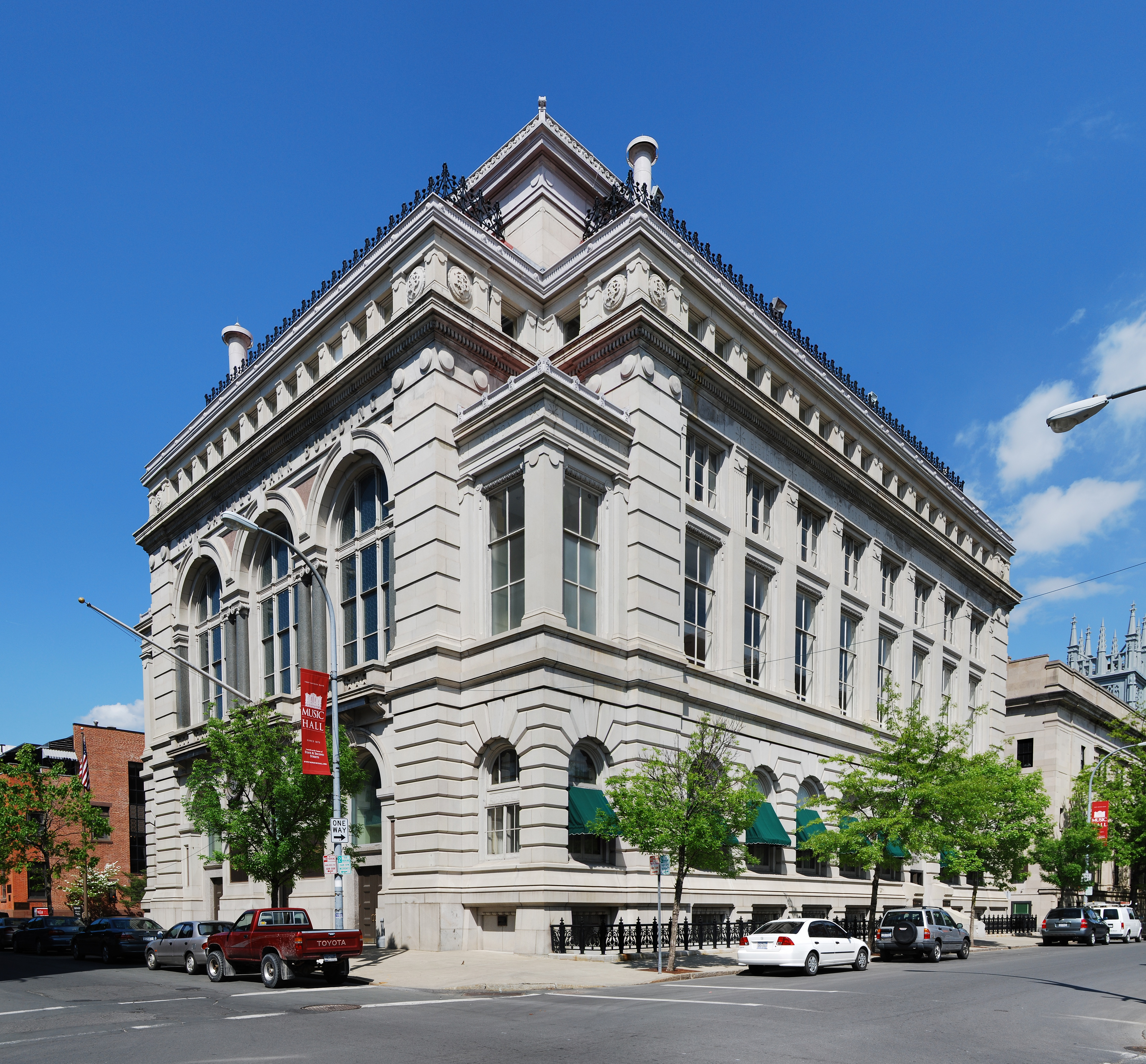
- Looking up at the Troy Savings Bank from the street

- Location within New York Location within the United States
- Location: 32 Second Street, Troy, NY
- Coordinates: 42°43′49″N 73°41′29″W
- Area: 1 acre (0.40 ha)
- Built: 1871-75
- Architect: George B. Post
- Architectural style: Second Empire, Italianate
- Part of: Central Troy Historic District (ID86001527)
- NRHP reference No.: 89001066

Significant dates
- Added to NRHP: April 11, 1989
- Designated NHL: April 11, 1989
- Designated CP: August 13, 1986

Troy Savings Bank Music Hall, is a performance space in Troy, Rensselaer County, New York, United States. The music hall, renowned for its acoustics and an Odell concert organ, is operated by a not-for-profit organization. Completed in 1875, it was designated a National Historic Landmark in 1989 for its architecture as one of the finest surviving 19th-century auditoriums.

== History ==
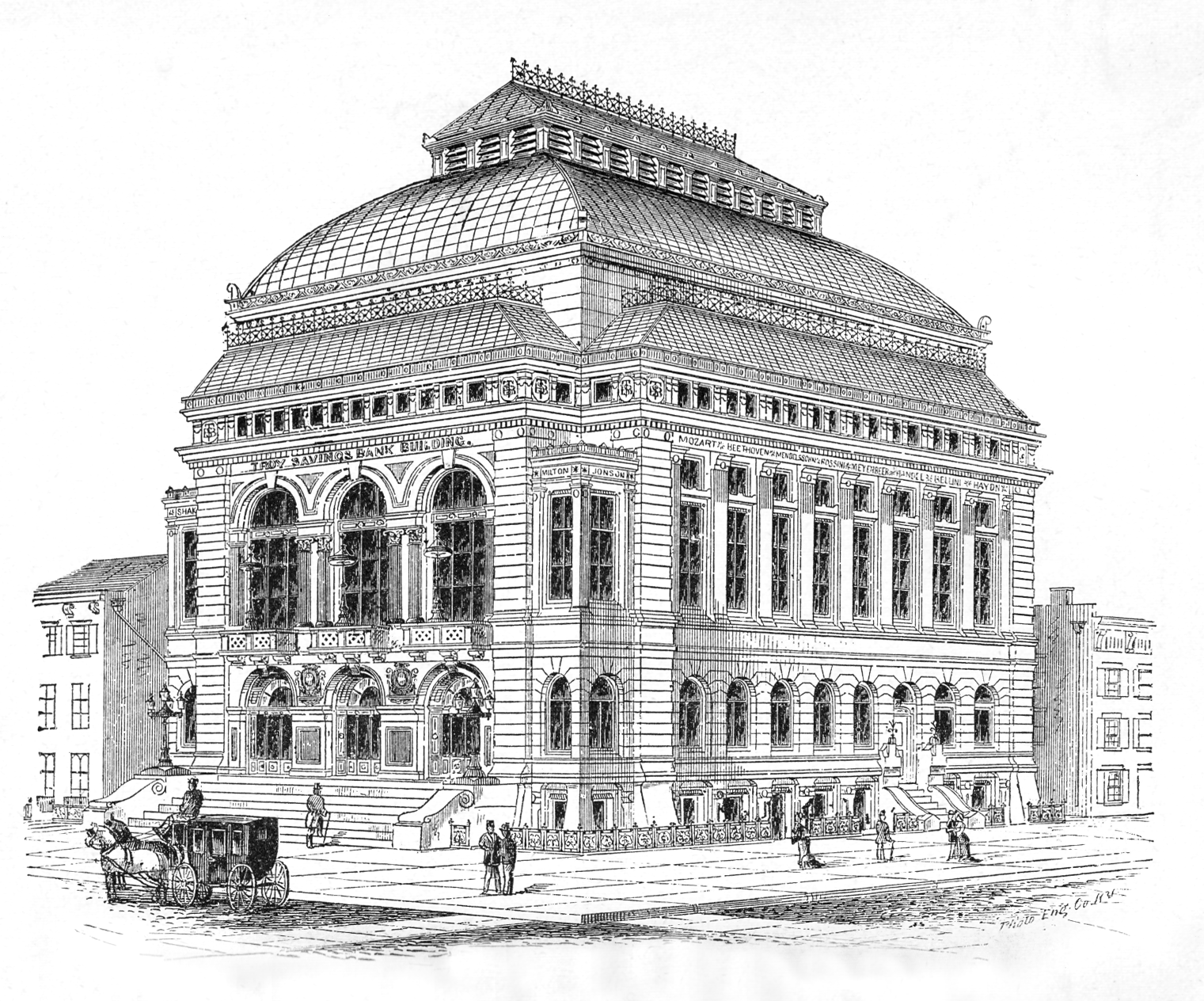
Engraving from 1876

The Troy Savings Bank was founded in 1823 and moved to its current location in 1870. In appreciation of the community's support, the plans for the new building called for a music hall to be built on the upper floors.

In the early years of the 20th century the Music Hall featured performances from artists such as Lillian Nordica, Henri Vieuxtemps, Ignace Jan Paderewski, Albert Spalding, Sergei Rachmaninoff, Myra Hess and Jose Iturbi. In the 1930s and 1940s, artists including Vladimir Horowitz, Yehudi Menuhin and Artur Rubinstein played there. It was a usual stop for a musician on a tour around America.

Apparently not up to modern building codes, there was long a tradition that prior to each performance the Fire Marshal would come out on stage and announce "There is absolutely no smoking in the Hall. If you have to smoke, you can hit the streets at half time."

Following World War II, Troy's wealth declined and so did the bank's. Many public initiatives were begun to save the bank (and thus the music hall) from closure. Ideas included establishing an industrial and folk art museum downstairs and renting the Hall itself to the area's many colleges.

In 1979, the Troy Savings Bank Music Hall Revitalization Committee was founded by private citizens. With the bank's support and additional funding from the city and county for its administration, the Troy Savings Bank Music Hall Corporation was founded. A not-for-profit organization which still leases the Hall from the bank, the corporation began its ownership with a performance by the Benny Goodman Band in 1980. A corporate re-structuring and buyout followed, and, in 1999, the Troy Savings Bank converted to a public corporation. On January 16, 2004, First Niagara Financial Group, Inc. acquired Troy Financial Corporation, the holding company for the Troy Savings Bank, and Troy Commercial Bank. In the fall of 2016, First Niagara merged with KeyBank.

It is a contributing property to the Central Troy Historic District.

== Design ==
George B. Post's design was selected by default: due to his pioneer work in crafting metal to simulate stone in a building's superstructure, it was the only estimate to fall within the board's projected budget. A graduate of New York University, Post studied under Richard Morris Hunt in the mid 1800s and soon became a respected architect in New York City. His preference for the Beaux Arts and French Renaissance styles can be seen in the building's highly detailed decorations. Construction began on the bank's new property on the corner of State and Second Streets in July 1871.

The building was completed in April 1875, at a final cost of $435,000. The result was a massive six story edifice that dominates the surrounding neighborhood. The bank offices comprised about one-third of the first floor; the remainder was rented to area businesses, including at various times an insurance company, the Troy Chamber of Commerce, a bus terminal and a plumbing company. Above this rose the Music Hall: 106 feet long, 69 feet wide and a towering 61 feet high.

Original granite stairs running the width of the building introduced concert-goers to the ornate grandeur of the hall. Box offices to the left and right preceded a center stairway, which led to the hall itself. Parquet and Dress Circle seats were, and still are, reached by using the center staircase. Iron staircases on either side guided the way to the upper and lower boxes, the balcony, and the gallery seating areas. The hall's seating capacity is 1,253, and seating arrangements have never changed. Post designed all of the staircases himself and had them constructed by Architectural Iron Works in New York City.

Intricate frescoes, crafted by another New York City firm, G. Garibaldi, decorated the walls about the stage and ceiling. The frescoes above the stage were covered by the addition of a large tracker action organ in October 1890.

Most of the original frescoing is still visible, except for the ceiling, where the replacement of the chandelier in 1930 also involved repair work on the ceiling frescoes. The first chandelier was remarkable, with 14,000 hand-cut French prisms catching the light of 260 gas burners, ignited by a single traveling gas jet. In October 1923, it was converted to electric, and later replaced by the chandelier which hangs there today. The rest of the lighting was converted in 1929, following an accident in December 1928, when a ballerina's headdress was ignited by a gas lamp in her dressing room. Consequently, the fire marshal ordered the conversion from gas to electric as a safety precaution. The new frescoes, made in 1930, outlined the rim of the ceiling and exhibited the popular Art Deco styling of the late 1920s in the lettering, featuring the names of great classical composers such as J. S. Bach and Haydn. The chandelier has not been modernized, and still must be raised and lowered by a hand crank.

The building was declared a National Historic Landmark in 1989.

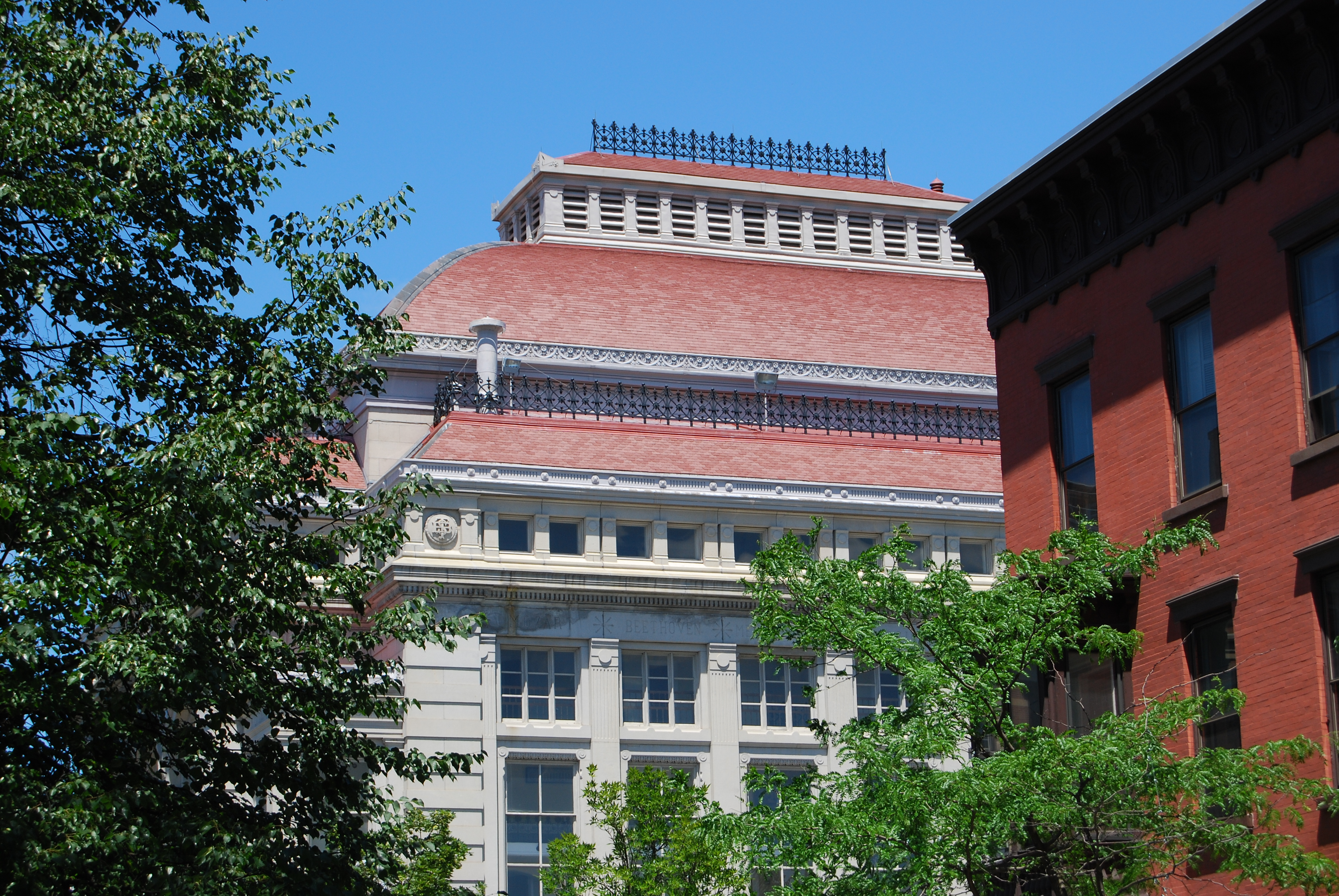
The music hall's iconic roof

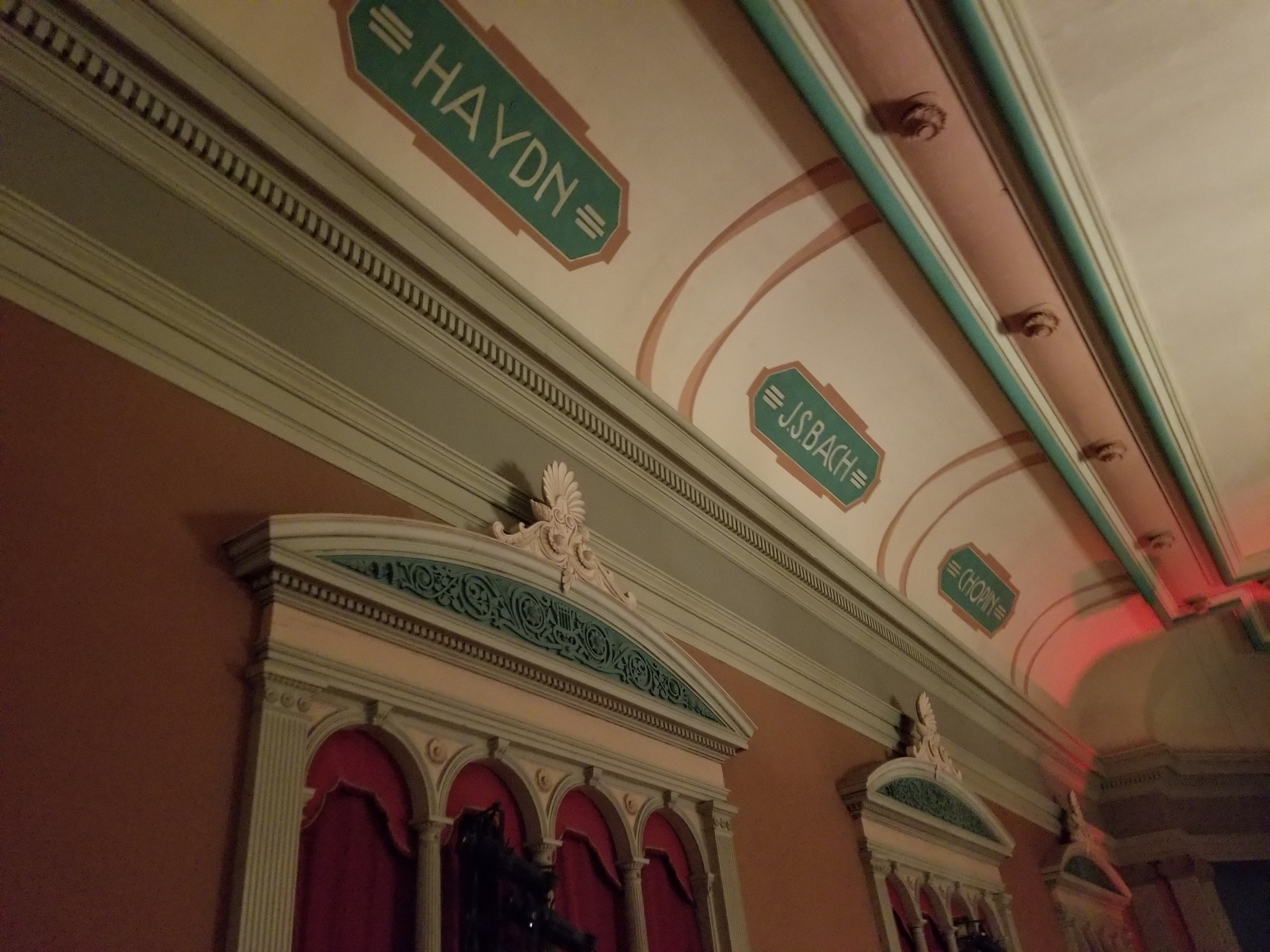
North Ceiling

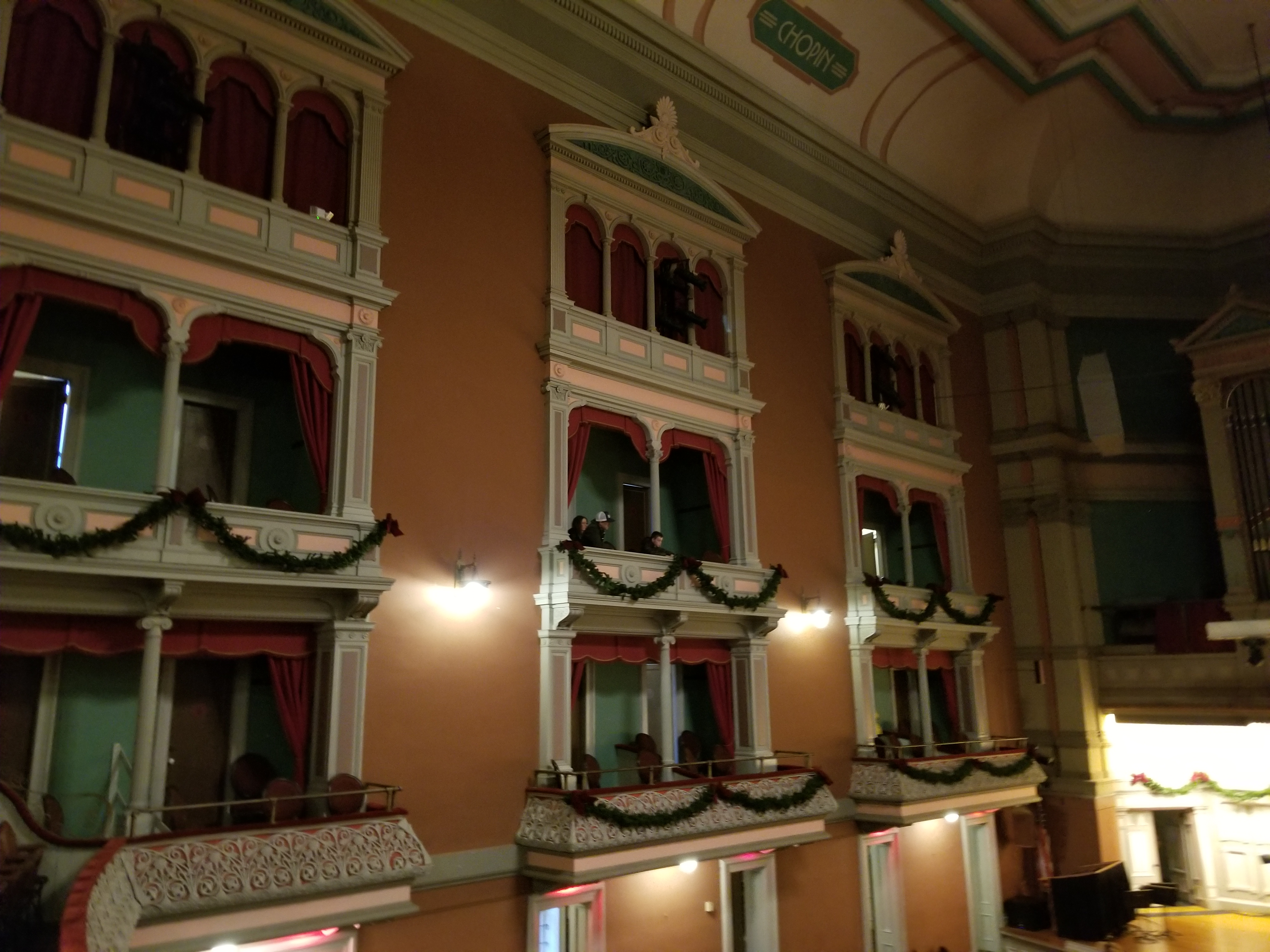
North Boxes

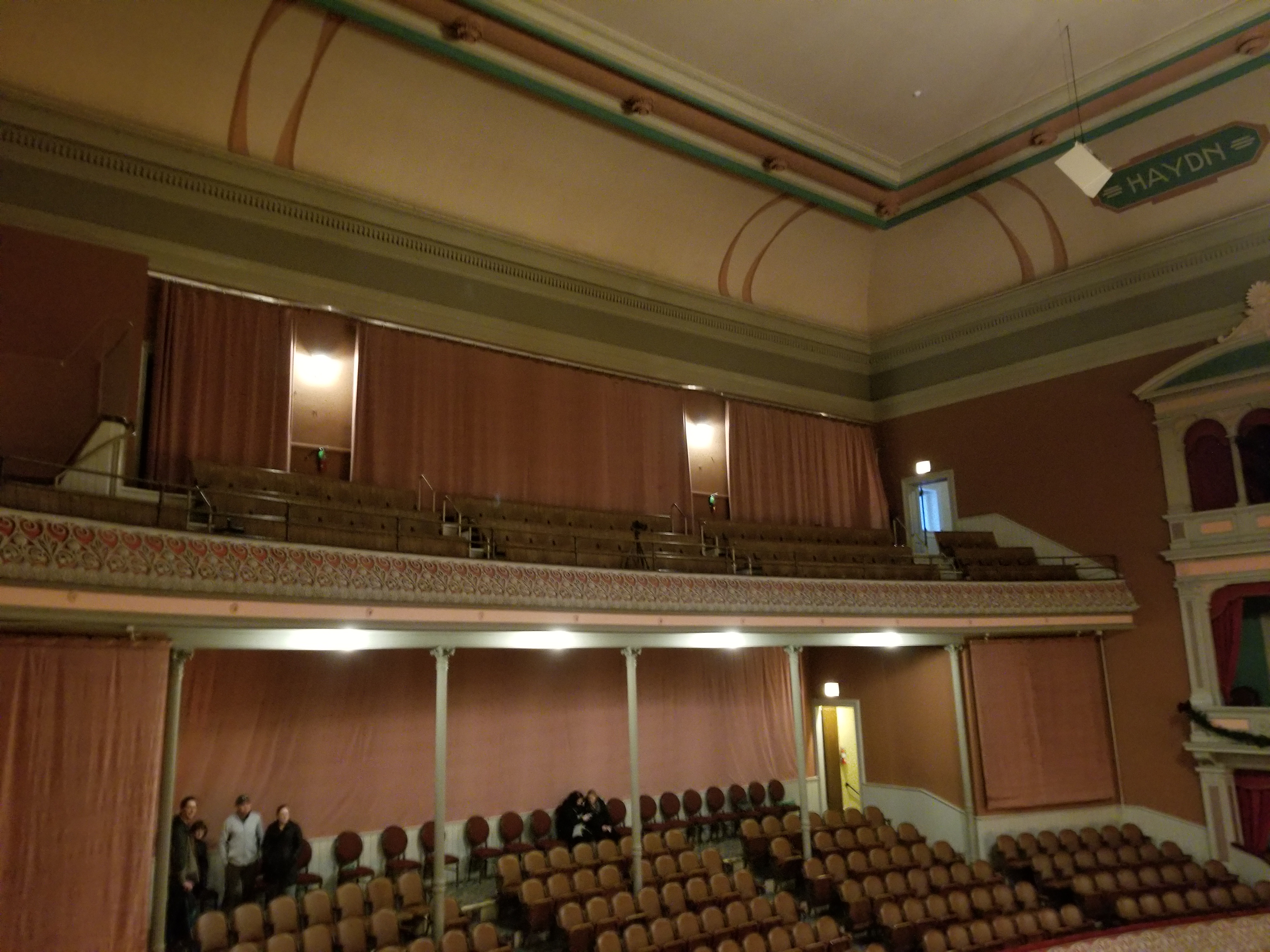
Upper two seating areas

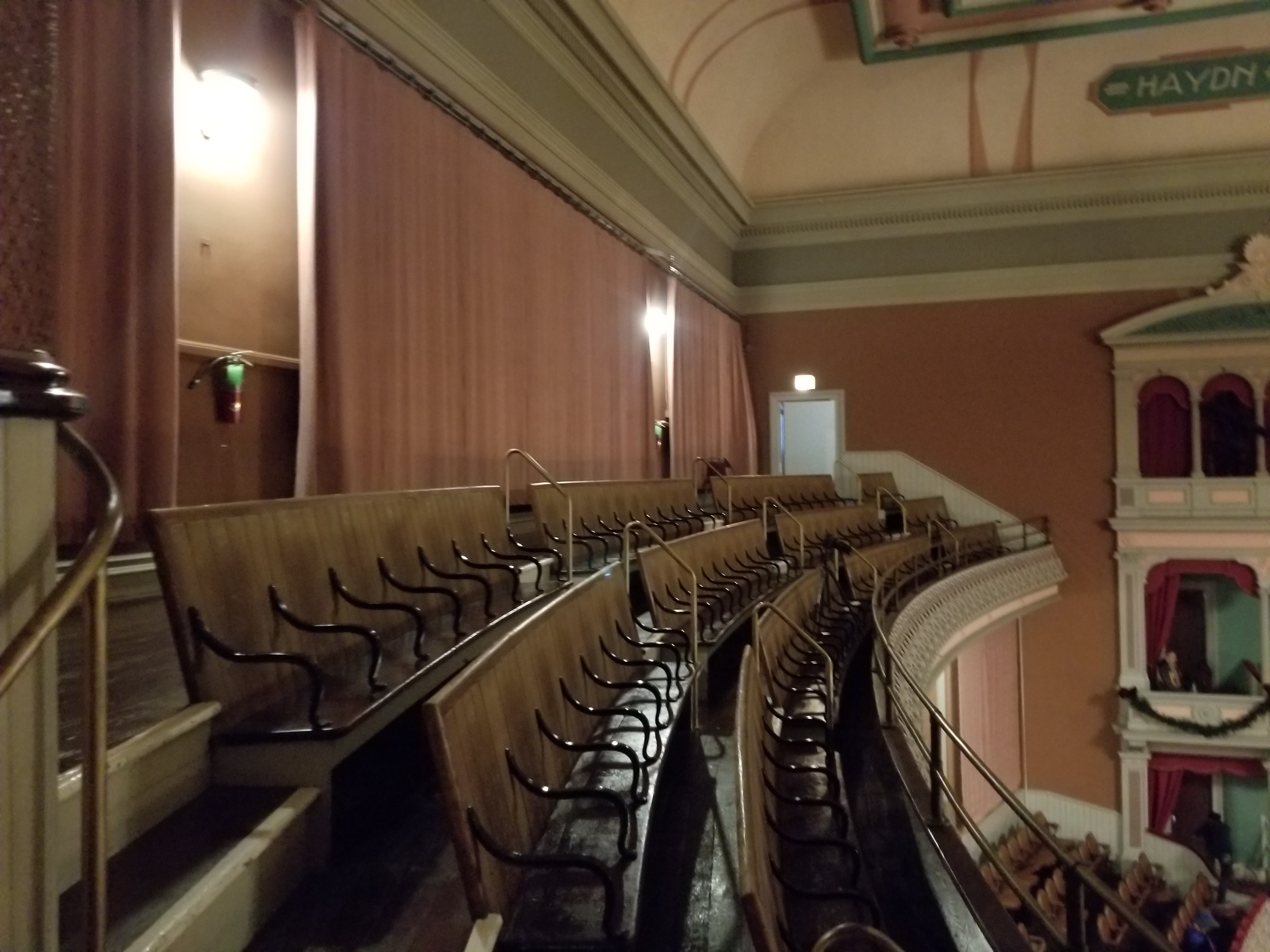
Upper level benches

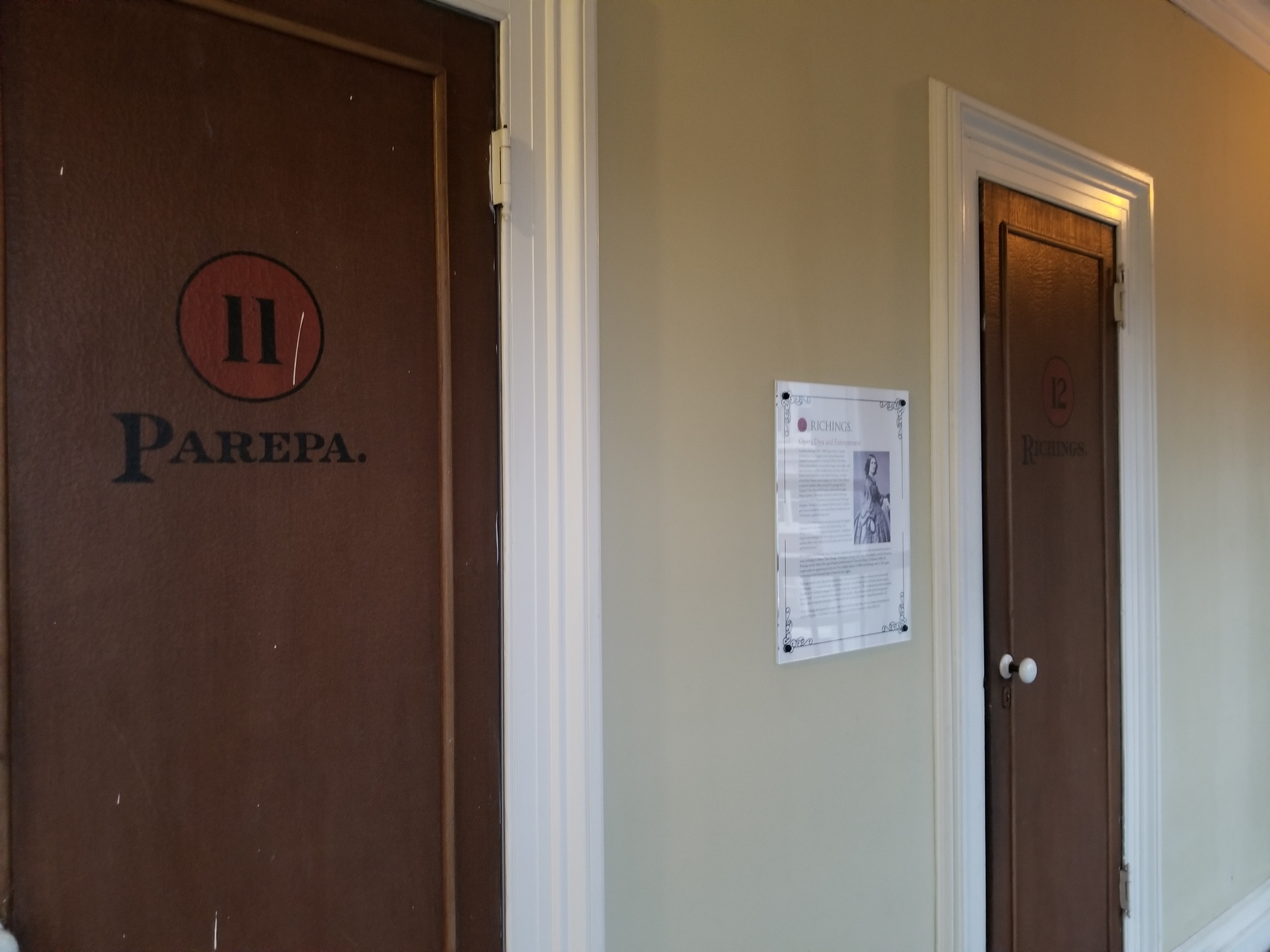
Doors to south side boxes

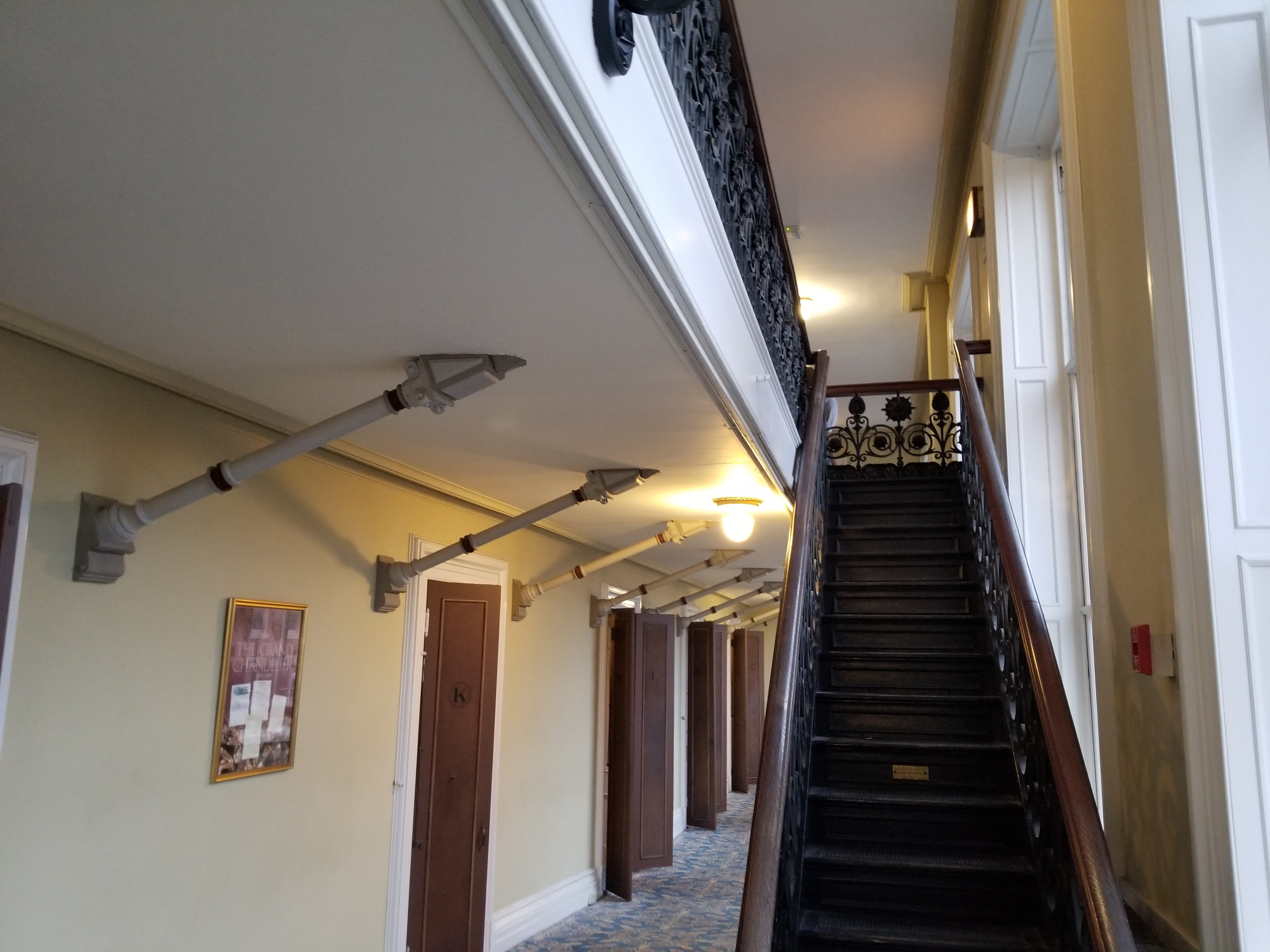
South side staircase

== Organ ==
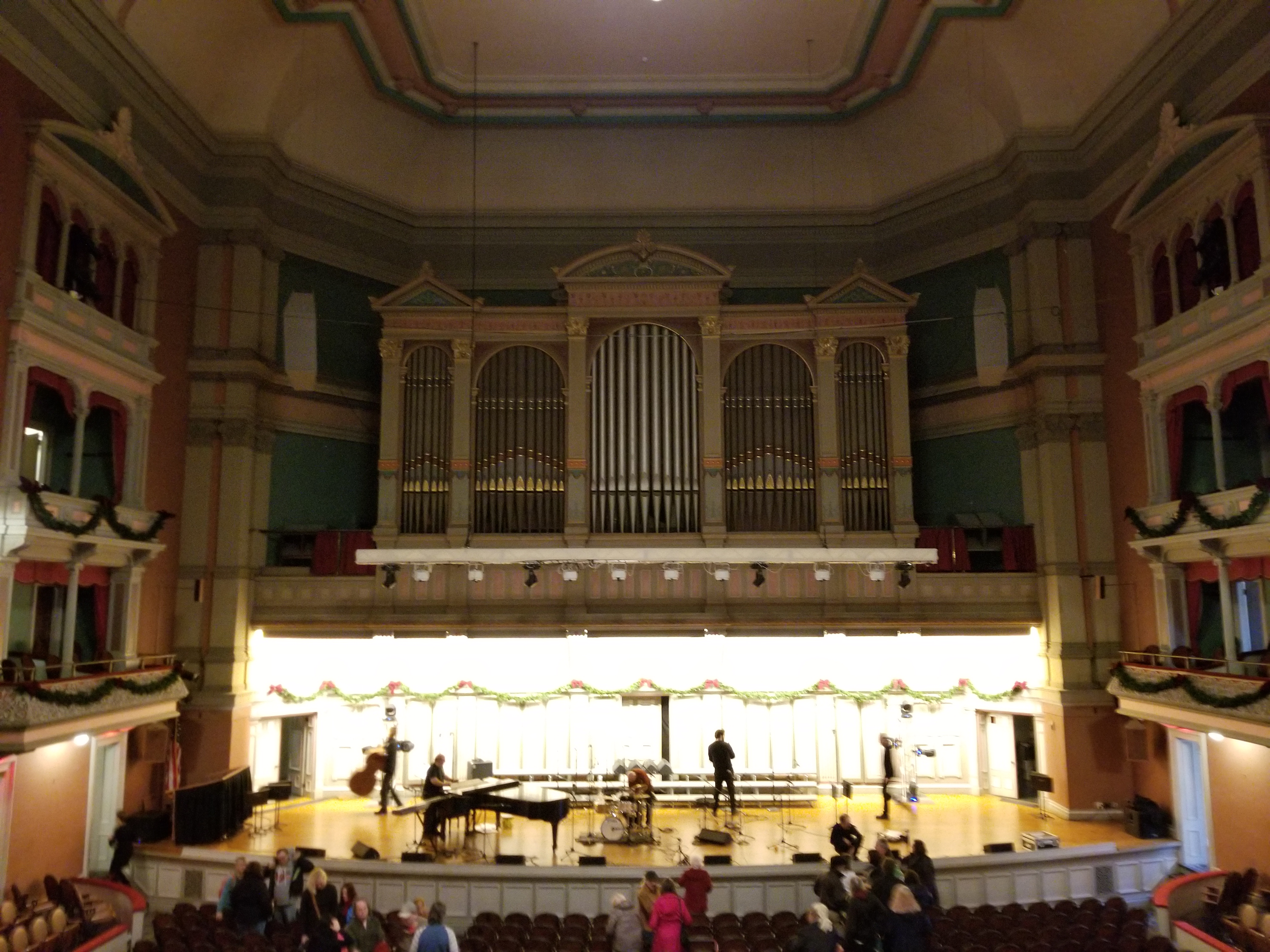
The stage and Odell Opus 190 organ

The organ at the Troy Savings Bank Music Hall was built in 1882 as Opus 190 of J. H. & C. S. Odell of Yonkers, New York, and originally installed in the home of New York City financier William Belden. The original purchase price of the instrument was $12,470. The Troy Savings Bank purchased the organ from Mr. Belden in 1889 and the instrument was installed in the Music Hall during the months of August through October, 1890. The first notes from the Odell Opus 190 in the Hall were heard on October 20, 1890. The organ was maintained in usable condition until the 1960s, at which point it fell into disrepair.

In early 2006, an effort was mounted to restore the organ after decades of neglect. Under the impetus of the Organ Historical Society and under the direction of organ builder S.L Huntington & Co. of Stonington, Connecticut, a crew of volunteers worked over the course of several weeks to restore the organ to playable condition. The instrument was featured during the Organ Historical Society's 2006 convention.

== Acoustics ==
Factors that contribute to the acoustics include the narrow shoebox form, early sidewall reflections, tall ceiling, seat count of 1180, padded wooden seats, shallow under balcony, thick plaster surfaces, ornamental detailing, and the organ cove which projects sound. The acoustically sensitive hall is rented for concerts and recordings.
