= Lewis Mumford House =

Historic house in New York, United States

- U.S. National Register of Historic Places
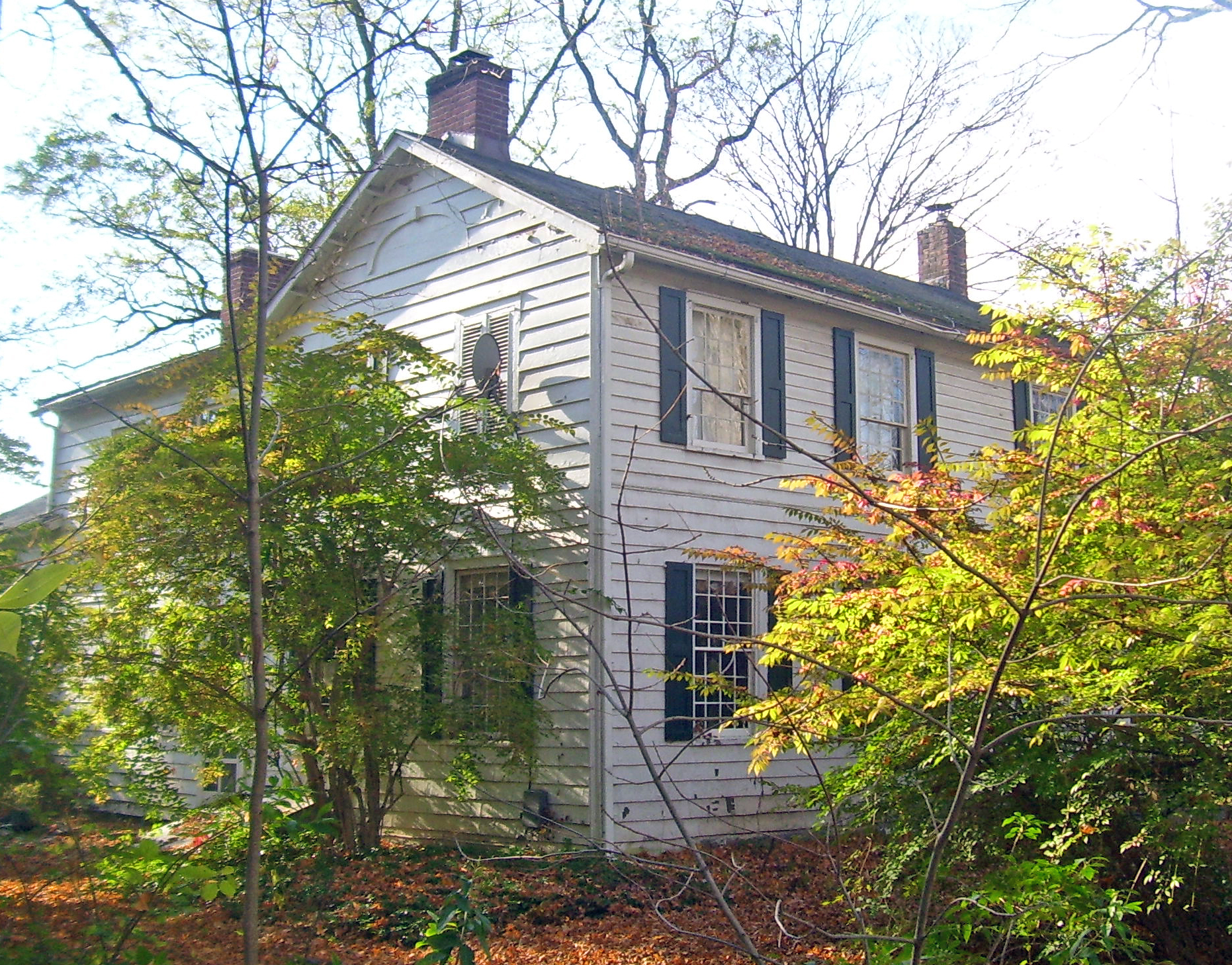
- South profile and east elevation, 2008
- Location: Amenia, NY
- Nearest city: Poughkeepsie
- Coordinates: 41°51′1″N 73°30′39″W
- Area: 13.6 acres (5.5 ha)
- Built: 1837
- Architectural style: Federal
- NRHP reference No.: 99001209
- Added to NRHP: October 15, 1999

The Lewis Mumford House is located on Leedsville Road (Dutchess County Route 2) in the Town of Amenia, New York, United States. It is a white Federal style building dating to the 1830s.

Social philosopher, historian and cultural critic Lewis Mumford and his wife bought the house in the late 1920s, originally using it as a summer house. By the mid-1930s, they decided to make it their permanent residence for a few years. That period extended to more than half a century, the rest of Mumford's life. His experience of living in a rural area informed some of Mumford's thinking about cities and how they should be shaped. In 1999, a few years after his death, the property was listed on the National Register of Historic Places.

== Buildings and grounds ==
The property listed on the Register consists of two adjoining parcels: a 1.9-acre (7,700 m^{2}) lot with the house and carriage house and a larger 11.7-acre (4.7 ha) open field stretching back to Webutuck Creek. Both are located on the west side of Leedsville Road, a street of large semi-wooded residential lots, most formerly part of larger farms, in the eastern section of Amenia. There is a similar 19th-century farmhouse just across the street. The Mumford property is a half-mile (1 km) south of state highway NY 343 and a similar distance west of the Connecticut state line. The house, carriage house and landscaping on the property are all considered contributing resources to the listing.

=== House ===
The main house's east (front) section is a three-bay two-story frame structure on a stone foundation sided in clapboard. It is topped with a side-gabled roof shingled in asphalt, pierced by two brick chimneys at either end. A perpendicular rear wing, similarly sided, is one and a half stories in height, with side entrances and a single-story sunroom added to the rear.

A single-bay porch with arched pediment and two round columns shelters the main entrance at the northern end of the front facade. All windows have solid wooden shutters. Semicircular windows at the attic level on either side elevation have been boarded in.

Federal-style crown moldings, pilasters and fielded side panels surround the main entrance. It opens to a small main hall that gives onto a living room with exposed ceiling beams. A study, kitchen and pantry, bathroom and the sunroom complete the first floor. The flooring is wide pine boards. The brick kitchen fireplace has a large mantel and bake oven.

Two staircases lead up to the second floor. The front one has been opened up to provide more light to the upstairs. The kitchen stair is narrow and steep. The basement has a dirt floor and the original, unfinished stone walls.

External image
- 1966 watercolor by Mumford of house from rear

=== Carriage house and landscaping ===
To the rear of the house, at the end of the driveway, is the former carriage house, modified for use as an automotive garage. It is a single-story post and beam wood pegged structure sided in clapboard with an asphalt-shingled roof. It has a low loft inside, a northern addition to accommodate a car, and three windows on the south side.

Stone paths lead from the driveway south to the house. They are complemented in the landscaping by mature plantings including ornamental shrubs around the house and curvilinear flower beds in the rear yard. Intersecting paths lead through the woods to the open field in the rear.

== History ==
There is some uncertainty about the age of the house. In his 1982 autobiography Sketches of Life, Mumford gives its construction date as 1837. Research done by New York's State Historic Preservation Office in preparation for the Register nomination found that it might be as much as a decade older.

Mumford, a mostly self-taught New York City native, and his wife Sophia had lived in Greenwich Village and Sunnyside Gardens in Queens following their 1921 marriage. After the success of Sticks and Stones, his 1924 history of American architecture, critic Joel Elias Spingarn invited him up to his Amenia estate, Troutbeck. The Mumfords spent the summer of 1926 there, and returned in the following years.

By 1929 they had decided to purchase a property of their own for their summers, and found the house just down the road from Troutbeck. For $2,500 ($47,000 in contemporary dollars), they bought the house and what Mumford later called its "weedy acre". After seven more summers, the family decided to settle there year-round in 1936, and began adding additional acreage and upgrading the house with electricity and heating to make it livable in wintertime.

It was a considerable adjustment for the Mumfords, both of whom had up to that point been city dwellers. "There," wrote one scholar three decades later, "the rural life that previously he had only glimpsed became real to him." He took up gardening in earnest, and the Mumfords began landscaping the property, eventually adding paths that opened up vistas across the Webutuck valley to Oblong Mountain on the west. They bought a used 1932 Chevrolet, their first car. Mumford left it to his wife to drive after he nearly crashed it into the maple trees in front of the house on one attempt to learn, and swore never to get behind the wheel again.

The Mumfords primarily socialized with the Spingarns up the road. They nevertheless appreciated their neighbors' help in lending them tools and garden equipment and watching the house when they were away from it; one large family nearby was extremely helpful with the Mumford children. The experience reinforced Mumford's belief that livable city neighborhoods needed to have "something of the village" in them.

They told their friends in New York that they initially meant to stay in Amenia for only a few years. But Lewis gradually found the quiet rural environment a good place to write, and it was in the downstairs study that he turned out many of his later major works on the role of cities in civilization and the roots of industrialization. In the early 1940s, after his son Geddes was killed in action during World War II, Mumford recalled his son's childhood in and around the house in Green Memories.

"We gradually fell in love with our shabby house as a young man might fall in love with a homely girl whose voice and smile were irresistible", Mumford later recalled. "In no sense was this the house of dreams. But over our lifetime it has slowly turned into something better, the house of our realities ... [T]his dear house has enfolded and remodeled our family character—exposing our limitations as well as our virtues."

Over the rest of their lives, the Mumfords sometimes took residence elsewhere for Lewis's teaching or research positions, up to a year at a time. They always returned to what they called the "Great Good Place". Mumford's biographer Donald Miller wrote:

In the act of living in this house and making it over it became like a person to them; and like a good friend they grew more fond of it with closer and deeper acquaintance. Every patch garden and lawn, every vista and view, carried the imprint of some of the best hours of their lives.

They made some changes to it, siding the first story in shingles and removing the south chimney. Inside they put bookcases on almost every wall.

In the 1980s, when Lewis could no longer write due to his advanced age, he retreated to the house. He died there in his bed in 1990, at the age of 94. Sophia followed him seven years later.

After her death, the house was sold to a local carpenter who decided to restore it to its original appearance and resell it. He removed all the bookcases and the nine layers of linoleum the Mumfords had added to the kitchen floor every time one wore out. Later renovations restored the original siding and chimney.

In 1999, after being listed on the National Register, the house was again put up for sale with a list price of $375,000. The restorations made it more difficult to sell despite the historic provenance, since it still lacked many amenities sought by contemporary buyers of country houses. It eventually did, and is now an occupied residence again.

== See also ==
- National Register of Historic Places listings in Dutchess County, New York
