= Beth David Synagogue (Amenia, New York) =

Reform synagogue in Armenia, New York, US

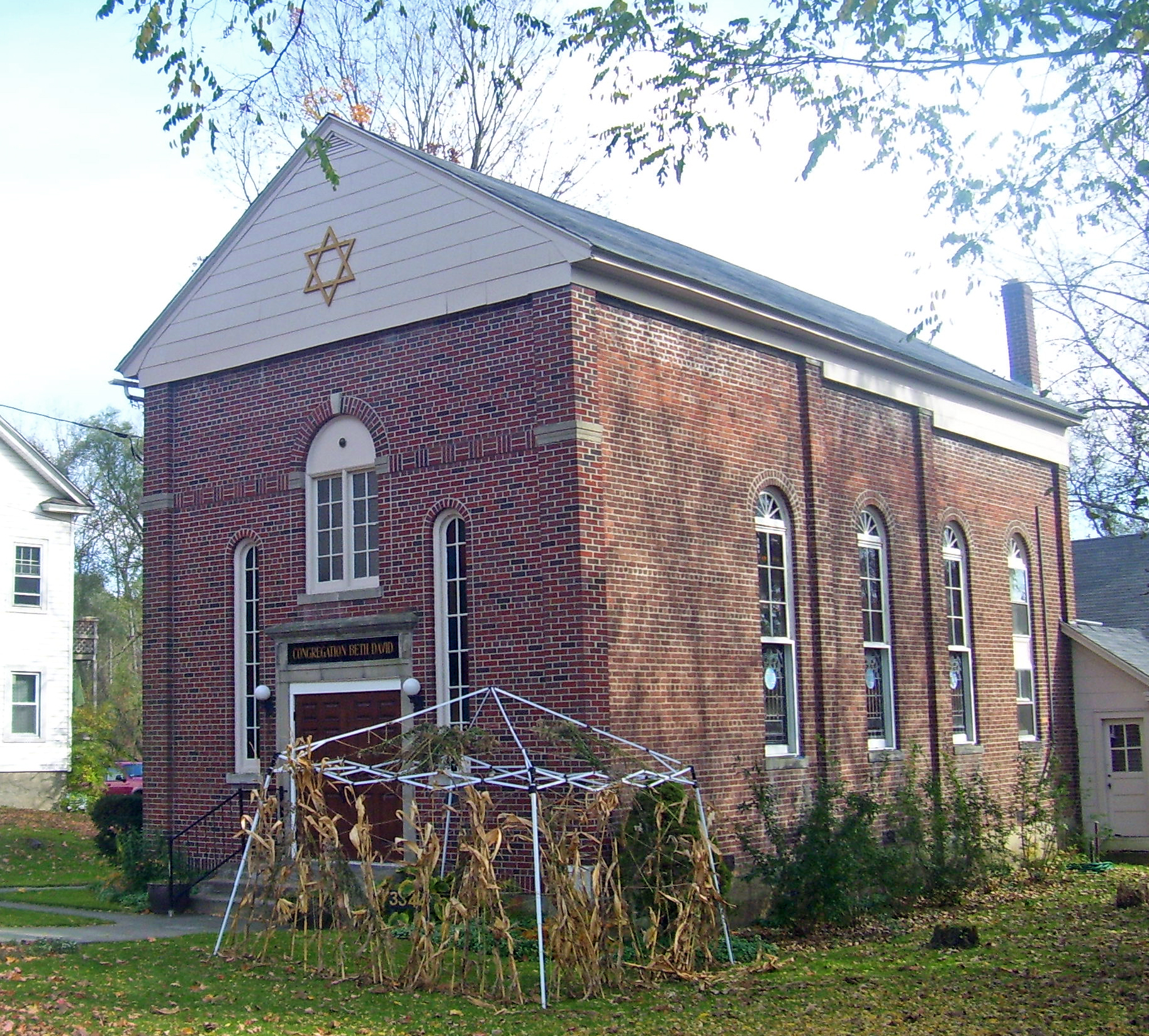
- North elevation and west profile of synagogue with sukkah in front, 2008

- Location in New York

Religion
- Affiliation: Reform Judaism
- Ecclesiastical or organizational status: Synagogue
- Leadership: Rabbi Dr. Jon Haddon (Emeritus)
- Status: Active

Location
- Location: 3344 East Main Street (NY 343), Amenia, New York 12501
- Country: United States
- Interactive map of Beth David Synagogue
- Coordinates: 41°50′49″N 73°33′17″W

Architecture
- Type: Synagogue
- Style: Georgian Revival influences
- Established: c. 1920s (as a congregation)
- Completed: 1929

Specifications
- Direction of façade: North
- Materials: Concrete, brick, asphalt

Website
- congbethdavid.org
- Beth David Synagogue
- U.S. National Register of Historic Places
- NRHP reference No.: 02000308
- Added to NRHP: April 8, 2002

Beth David Synagogue, formally Congregation Beth David, is a Reform Jewish congregation and synagogue located at 3344 East Main Street (also state highway NY 343) in the hamlet of Amenia, New York, in the United States. It is a small brick European-style building erected in the late 1920s.

It was built by the area's small community of Russian Jewish emigrants. Over the years, its membership has dwindled and it has moved from its original Orthodox affiliation to Conservative, and eventually to Reform practices. It was added to the National Register of Historic Places in 2002, the only synagogue in New York east of the Hudson River and north of New York City to be listed.

== Building ==
The synagogue is on a 46 by 124 feet (14 by 38 m) lot on the south side of East Main, about a quarter-mile (250 m) east of the intersection of highways NY 22, US 44 and NY 343 at the center of the hamlet. There are houses across the street from various eras of Amenia's existence. To the west of the synagogue is a woodlot; to the east is a 19th-century house. Rows of planted evergreen trees set off the synagogue lot lines on east and west and a small concrete sidewalk leads to the front steps from the main sidewalk along East Main.

=== Exterior ===
The building is a tall one-story building on a parged concrete foundation sided in hollow tile over which a brick veneer in common bond has been pasted and cast stone trim applied. Brick pilasters mark the corners of the north (front) facade and the three-bay side elevations. On top is a gabled roof, pierced by a narrow brick chimney at the southwest, with the ends clad in asbestos shingles. It has a frame rear wing oriented perpendicularly to the main block.

Three concrete steps with flagstone insets, partially covered by a wooden wheelchair ramp, lead to the front entrance. It consists of double wooden doors with a cast stone surround surmounted by a glass panel above the doors with "CONGREGATION BETH DAVID" reverse painted in gold letters on a black background. It is flanked by two sconces and tall, narrow round arched windows with a header course of bricks and cast stone lintels. Above the door is a wider round-arched double window with a blind transom and brick arch surround. Cast stone impost blocks engage a horizontal stringer course of brick in a basket-weave pattern that also engages the similar cast stone capitals on the pilasters. A gold-colored Star of David is in the gable field.

Both east and west profiles have similar long, narrow windows in their bays, divided by pilasters topped with a plain frieze that becomes wider with each pilaster south. Both also have a fourth bay at the south end with a different treatment. On the west it has been divided by a spandrel; on the east it is a small window that lights only the lower space.

Two small windows on the upper story complete the fenestration of the main block. The older one-story frame rear wing with shed roof and brick chimney connects with the newer addition, a gable-roofed section wider than the main block on a concrete foundation sided in asbestos shingles. It has an entrance and porch in its east end.

=== Interior ===
The main entrance opens on a small vestibule with a staircase to the upstairs gallery on the west and a bathroom on the east. Another pair of doors leads into the sanctuary, a square space with high ceiling floored in carpeted fir with plaster walls and ceiling in a two-tone color scheme. It has a traditional Orthodox layout, with a centrally located bimah surrounded on three sides by theatre-style pews with individually upholstered fold-down seats. The pews and bimah are dark stained pine. All face a Torah ark projecting from the rear wall, painted with murals of candlesticks and scrolls.

Atop the ark are a pair of gilt Lions of Judah holding a scroll with a hanging lighted crown above. Two stairs with electric lights on the upper newel post lead up to the bimah. Above it is the central chandelier.

Sconces along the sides alternate with the windows, whose lower sashes have stained glass with geometric designs and Jewish symbols. Bookcases and commemorative plaques are located beneath the balcony. Another bathroom is located to the east of the balcony, which has a high solid rail.

Behind the sanctuary, but not directly accessible from it, is an area with a kitchen on the first floor and the rabbi's study on the second. The smaller wing section has bathrooms and a storage room, with the larger addition given over entirely to a classroom with pasteboard walls and simple woodwork. The flooring is carpeted fir. Walls and ceilings are plaster in a two-tone color scheme.

== History ==
Beth David was founded by a group of 12 to 15 Russian Jewish families that had settled in Amenia. Many had come there from nearby Ellsworth, Connecticut, in the eastern part of the town of Sharon, where they farmed and rented rooms to visitors from the city in summertime. By the 1920s, many had moved across the state line, as Amenia had better schools and electricity, as well as convenient rail access to New York City via the New York Central Railroad's Harlem Valley line. Several families went into the resort business full-time, opening their own hotels around nearby Lake Amenia.

It was a small Jewish community compared to those that had sprung up in the Catskills, on the other side of the Hudson Valley. Members at first worshiped in their homes, raising the money over several years to build their own synagogue. A small plot of land was donated, and the cornerstone lain on April 5, 1929, at a ceremony attended by members of the local Christian community as well. All present donated to the construction of the synagogue, raising a total of $240 ($5,000 in contemporary dollars).

The synagogue, open later that year, was originally a flat-roofed structure with low parapets similar to those in Eastern Europe. Its interior plan, with centrally located bimah and upstairs gallery for women, reflects that region's Orthodox traditions, in keeping with origins of the founding families. The exterior brickwork shows some Georgian influence.

For the next two decades, the synagogue prospered along with Amenia's Jews. After World War II, in the 1950s, changes in vacationing habits led to the summer resorts closing down. Flooding after Hurricane Diane in 1955 destroyed the dam and drained Lake Amenia (now Beekman Park), ending that industry in the area. Children of the founding families left the area, taking the second generation with them. In 1960 the gabled roof was installed.

By 1970 the synagogue was down to 12 members. To sustain itself in the following decades, it became first Conservative, then Reform. Despite fluctuations in membership, in 2004 the congregation celebrated the synagogue's 75th anniversary. In 2016, Beth David is a vibrant Reform Congregation, drawing its growing membership from both permanent residents and weekenders in Dutchess and Litchfield Counties.

== See also ==
- National Register of Historic Places listings in Dutchess County, New York
- History of the Jews in New York
