= Kakistocracy =

Government run by the least qualified

Kakistocracy (/ˌkækɪˈstɒkrəsi/ KAK-ih-STOK-rə-see) is government by the worst, least qualified, or most unscrupulous people.

The word was coined as early as the seventeenth century and derives from two Greek words, kákistos (κάκιστος, 'worst') and krátos (κράτος, 'rule'), together meaning 'government by the worst people'.

== History ==
The earliest use of the word dates to the seventeenth century, in Paul Gosnold's A sermon preached at the publique fast the ninth day of Aug. 1644 at St. Maries, Oxford, before the honorable members of the two Houses of Parliament there assembled:

Therefore we need not make any scruple of praying against such: against those Sanctimonious Incendiaries, who have fetched fire from heaven to set their Country in combustion, have pretended Religion to raise and maintaine a most wicked rebellion: against those Nero's, who have ripped up the wombe of the mother that bare them, and wounded the breasts that gave them sucke: against those Cannibal's who feed upon the flesh and are drunke with the bloud of their own brethren: against those Catiline's who seeke their private ends in the publicke disturbance, and have set the Kingdome on fire to rost their owne egges: against those tempests of the State, those restlesse spirits who can no longer live, then be stickling and medling; who are stung with a perpetuall itch of changing and innovating, transforming our old Hierarchy into a new Presbytery, and this againe into a newer Independency; and our well-temperd Monarchy into a mad kinde of Kakistocracy. Good Lord!

During the period of the French Revolution, the term was used by detractors of Robespierre's government; Abraham Gotthelf Kästner did it in 1800. Italian author Vittorio Alfieri used the word "kakistocrazia" (kakistocracy) in 1797, as a sarcastic distortion of "aristocracy", to lament the end of the Republic of Venice invaded by Napoleon's army.

English author Thomas Love Peacock used the term in his 1829 novel The Misfortunes of Elphin, in which he explains that kakistocracy represents the opposite of aristocracy, as aristos (ἄριστος) means "excellent" in Greek. In his 1838 Memoir on Slavery (which he supported), U.S. Senator William Harper compared kakistocracy to anarchy, and said it had seldom occurred:

Anarchy is not so much the absence of government as the government of the worst—not aristocracy but kakistocracy—a state of things, which to the honor of our nature, has seldom obtained amongst men, and which perhaps was only fully exemplified during the worst times of the French revolution, when that horrid hell burnt with its most horrid flame. In such a state of things, to be accused is to be condemned—to protect the innocent is to be guilty; and what perhaps is the worst effect, even men of better nature, to whom their own deeds are abhorrent, are goaded by terror to be forward and emulous in deeds of guilt and violence.

American poet James Russell Lowell used the term in 1876, in a letter to Joel Benton, writing, "What fills me with doubt and dismay is the degradation of the moral tone. Is it or is it not a result of Democracy? Is ours a 'government of the people by the people for the people,' or a Kakistocracy rather, for the benefit of knaves at the cost of fools?"

== Contemporary use ==
The term is generally used by critics of a national government. It has been used variously to describe the Russian governments of Boris Yeltsin and Vladimir Putin, the government of Egypt under Abdel Fattah Al-Sisi, governments in sub-Saharan Africa, the government of the Philippines under Rodrigo Duterte, Brazil under Jair Bolsonaro, and various governments of the presidents of the United States.

The term gained significant popularity during the first presidency of Donald Trump, when it was frequently used by critics to describe his administration. It went viral in 2017 when used by then-MSNBC host Joy Reid and again following an April 2018 tweet by former CIA director John Brennan. The term has been used by commentators at numerous news outlets, political publications, and books to describe both of the Trump administrations.

In late 2024, Chicago mayor Brandon Johnson's administration was described as a kakistocracy in National Review.

The term was named the "2024 word of the year" by The Economist.

== See also ==
- Kleptocracy – government by corrupt leaders who use political power to steal the wealth of the people
- Oligarchy – government in which power rests with a small number of people
- Ochlocracy – oppressive majoritarian form of government (mob rule)
- Plutocracy – a society that is ruled or controlled by people of great wealth or income
- Political ponerology – government theory to explain aggressive war, ethnic cleansing, genocide, and despotism
