= St. Thomas Episcopal Church (Amenia Union, New York) =

Historic church in New York, United States

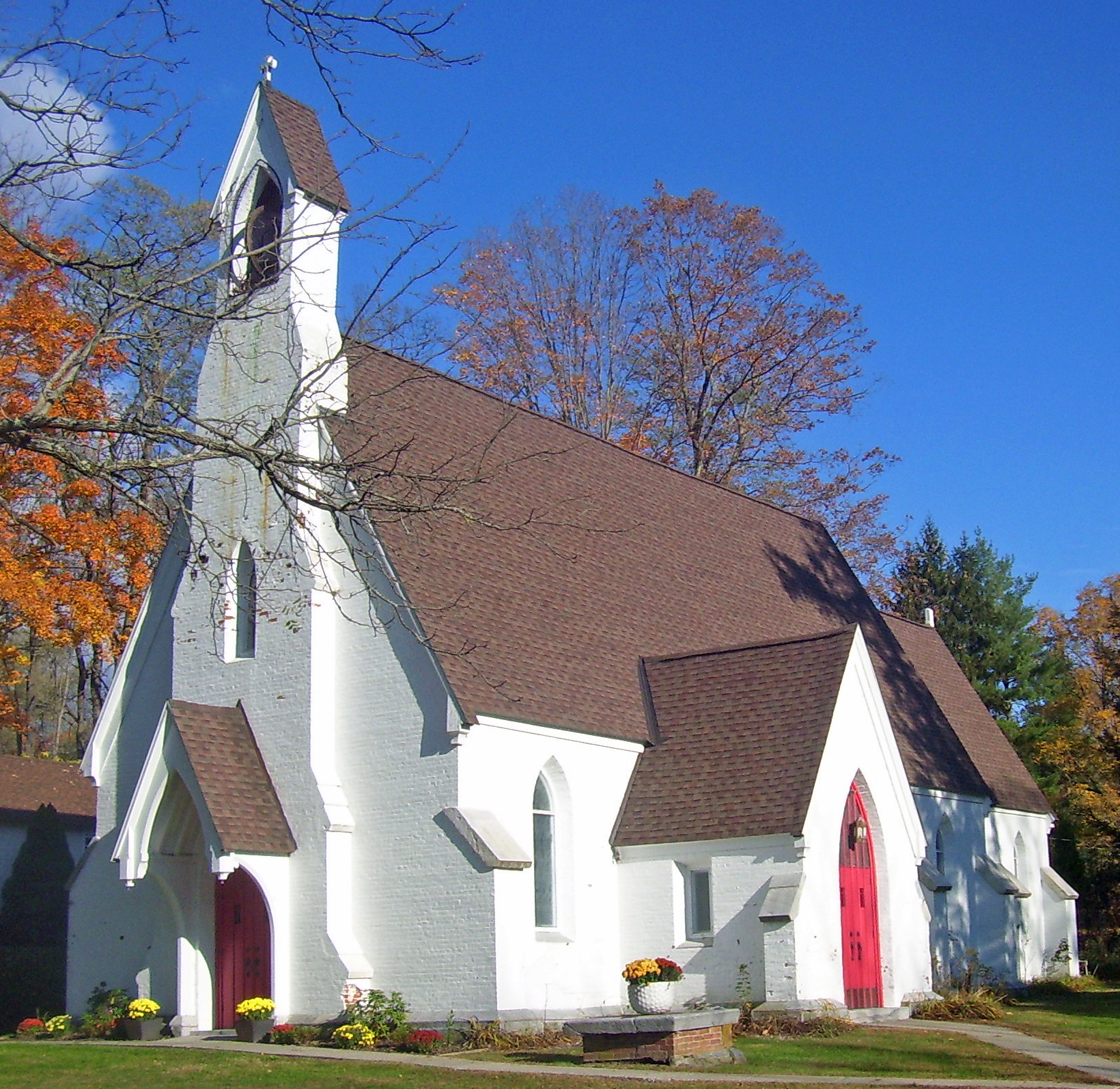
- Northwest elevation and south profile, with carriage step in foreground, 2008

Religion
- Affiliation: Episcopal Church in the United States of America
- Leadership: The Rev. AJ Stack
- Year consecrated: 1852

Location
- Location: Amenia Union, NY, USA
- Interactive map of St. Thomas Episcopal Church
- Coordinates: 41°49′30″N 73°30′21″W

Architecture
- Architect: Richard Upjohn
- Style: Gothic Revival
- Groundbreaking: 1849
- Completed: 1851
- Construction cost: $3,000

Specifications
- Direction of façade: northwest
- Materials: Stone, brick, asphalt

U.S. National Register of Historic Places
- Added to NRHP: April 6, 2005
- NRHP Reference no.: 05000261

Website
- Welcome to St. Thomas Episcopal Church

St. Thomas' Episcopal Church is located on Leedsville Road (Dutchess County Route 2) in Amenia Union, New York, United States. It is a mid-19th-century brick church designed by Richard Upjohn in the Gothic Revival architectural style, built for a congregation organized shortly before.

It is considered one of the finest American imitations of an English country parish church. Inside, it has a historic organ and Tiffany stained glass windows. In 2005 it, along with its parish house and a carriage step, were added to the National Register of Historic Places

== Buildings and grounds ==
The church and its outbuildings are located on a 3.6-acre (1.5 ha) lot on the north side of Leedsville Road in a small unincorporated hamlet known as Amenia Union in the eastern portion of the Town of Amenia. The property's northeast corner is on the Connecticut state line; state highway CT 41 begins at a junction just to the southeast. The lot is cleared up front, where the church and parish house are, and wooded in the rear. In addition to the church and parish house, there is a parking lot on the northwest.

Both buildings are at the southeast corner of the lot, close to the road. The church is oriented parallel to the road with the parish house behind it on a slight rise. The carriage step is near the southwest corner.

The church itself is a one-story building on a stone foundation faced in white-painted brick laid in common bond, with marble trim. It is topped by a steeply pitched gabled roof shingled in asphalt. A flat, slightly projecting tower capped with a gabled bellcote is on the northwest (front) facade above a hooded lancet-arched double wooden door and narrow lancet opening.

Both side elevations have buttresses separating lancet windows. On the south side the southwest corner has a projecting side entrance with gabled roof and two double wooden arched doors similar to the main entrance. From the rear the chancel, lower in height than the nave, projects. Its northeast has a small wing that contains the sacristy.

Inside, the nave has its pews arranged around a central aisle, with wooden floors and plaster walls. Pointed arch brackets support the purlins of the high ceiling; the windows have deep splayed plain surrounds. A three-part stained glass window at the rear of the chancel depicts an elderly St. John being carried into church. The geometric colored glass window behind the organ is the only original one.

The parish hall is a long concrete block mid-20th century structure with a similar gabled roof. The carriage step has large stone slabs on a brick foundation. Both are contributing resources to the National Register listing.

=== Aesthetics ===
The church's design reflects the principles of the high church movement in American Episcopalianism, of which its architect Richard Upjohn was a part. The English journal The Ecclesiologist, a part of the Oxford Movement, wrote strongly in favor of Gothic-styled churches like those found in English country parishes. They believed the form was ideal and conducive to the liturgical practices they advocated.

Most important was that the chancel face east, toward the rising sun. This was easy to do on the site, but awkwardly sited the church parallel to the road. Upjohn mitigated the effect by putting the porch entrance along that wall. It had the added benefit of being asymmetrical, another feature promoted by the high-church advocates, in contrast to the classically inspired church architecture of the early 19th century. The tall bell cote and entrance porch are also found on many of the English country churches seen as ideals by the writers at The Eccelesiologist.

Inside, the deep chancel is the most prominent high church feature, its floor raised to emphasize the altar and what goes on around it. The three lancet windows symbolize the Trinity. The walls are simple plaster and the chestnut ceiling trusses exposed. The minimal ornamentation reflects the dictum of A.W. Pugin, a leading theorist of the Gothic Revival, that "all ornament should consist of enrichment of the essential construction of the building", a position held just as firmly by Upjohn.

"Both inside and out", William Pierson, Jr., says in American Buildings and Their Architects, "St. Thomas is a coherent and austerely beautiful building, as expressive of its immediate circumstances as it is reflective of the ancient Gothic tradition from which it is born." He and other architectural historians have considered it one of the finest American interpretations of the Gothic English country parish church.

== History ==
The congregation was established in 1848 by local residents following missionary work in the area by the Rev. Homer Wheaton of the hamlet of Lithgow in the nearby Town of Washington. By the next year $2,000 had been raised by subscription to build a church. A local farmer donated not only $500 but all the bricks as well. Trinity Church in Lower Manhattan held a $500 mortgage on the property to complete the $3,000 ($116,000 in contemporary dollars) construction cost.

Prior to Wheaton's missionary work in eastern Dutchess, he had been rector of Christ Church in Poughkeepsie and a trustee of General Theological Seminary in New York City. In that capacity he came to know the leaders of the Episcopal Diocese of New York, and through them met Richard Upjohn, then working on Trinity. He invited Upjohn to design St. Thomas as well.

The original plan for the church called for a stone building, but that turned out to be too expensive. Members of the new congregation complemented their financial contributions by drawing foundation stones, sand and timber to the site with their own teams. Other materials were provided locally besides the bricks—the chestnut rafters were hewn from trees cut at Handlin Mill in the eastern portion of neighboring Sharon, Connecticut.

Stephen Knibloe was appointed senior warden in 1849. He was the first of a line of Knibloes to hold that post for all but two of the next 90 years. The church was completed in 1851, but was not consecrated until April 1852, when the Acting Bishop of New York could make the time to do so.

Later additions to the church include the stained glass, two of which are believed to have been Tiffany windows. In 1869 the bell, cast by Meneely Bell Foundry in Troy, was installed for $300 ($7,000 in contemporary dollars) The tripartite chancel window was imported from England at a cost of $1,085 ($32,000 in contemporary dollars) in 1875 and installed in memory of a recently deceased rector. Lastly, in 1886, the six-rank Odell organ was purchased from Jardine and Son in New York for ($18,000 in contemporary dollars) in 1886.

There have been no significant changes to the church interior since then, other than the replacement of most of the other stained glass in the 1950s. The parish house was built at that time as well, and the brick on the church exterior painted over in white in the hope of preventing spalling. A half century later, in the early 2000s, the organ was restored and then designated a historic instrument by the Organ Historical Society.

== See also ==
- National Register of Historic Places listings in Dutchess County, New York
