= Hendrik Winegar House =

Former historic house in New York, United States

- U.S. National Register of Historic Places
- Location within New York Location within the United States
- Nearest city: Amenia, New York
- Coordinates: 41°49′40″N 73°30′41″W
- Area: less than one acre
- Built: ca. 1761
- Architect: Winegar, Hendrick
- NRHP reference No.: 75001180
- Added to NRHP: April 15, 1975

Hendrik Winegar House was a historic home located at Amenia in Dutchess County, New York. The structure was demolished after decades of neglect. It was a 2 1/2-story, rectangular house on a high basement built of thick fieldstone and brick walls, built about 1761. It had a steeply pitched gable roof. It was coated in stucco applied about 1850.

It was added to the National Register of Historic Places in 1975.
