= Riverview School =

Private boarding & day school in East Sandwich, Massachusetts

Location
- 551 Route 6A; East Sandwich, Barnstable County, Massachusetts 02537-1494; United States
- Coordinates: 41.736°N 70.420°W

Information
- Type: Private boarding & day school
- Religious affiliation: Nonsectarian
- Established: 1957
- Founder: William Janse
- CEEB code: 220738
- NCES School ID: 00603541
- Head of school: Stewart Miller
- Faculty: 24
- Grades: 6-12
- Enrollment: 200 (2021-2022)
  - Grade 6: 1
  - Grade 7: 2
  - Grade 8: 6
  - Grade 9: 9
  - Grade 10: 19
  - Grade 11: 24
  - Grade 12: 34
  - Other: 105
- Student to teacher ratio: 8.3:1
- Campus size: 23 acres
- Colors: Teal and Gold
- Athletics: 1 interscholastic and intramural sports teams
- Mascot: The Helmsmen
- Rival: Maplebrook School
- Accreditation: NEASC
- Annual tuition: $104,569
- Affiliation: NAPSEC, NAIS
- Website: www.riverviewschool.org

Riverview School is a private boarding/day school for students, ages 11–22, with complex language, learning, and cognitive challenges located on Cape Cod, Massachusetts, United States. Students hail from every region of the United States and many foreign countries.

Riverview is accredited by the New England Association of Schools and Colleges (NEASC), licensed by the Department of Early Education and Care (DEEC), and approved by the Massachusetts Department of Elementary and Secondary Education (DESE).
