= Maplebrook School =

Coordinates: 41°51′53.97″N 73°32′43.76″W

- Amenia, New York; United States

Information
- Type: Co-ed private, boarding school; Day school
- Religious affiliation: Interfaith/nonsectarian
- Established: 1945
- Head of School: Daryl Hayes
- Faculty: 34 teachers
- Enrollment: 74 high school students 37 Boys, 37 Girls; 95% boarding 40 post-secondary students
- Average class size: 6 students
- Student to teacher ratio: 2:1
- Campus: 98 acres (400,000 m^{2})
- Colors: Green and White
- Athletics: 17 interscholastic and intramural sports teams
- Mascot: The Eagles
- Rival School: Riverview School
- Website: www.maplebrookschool.org

Maplebrook School is a small boarding school in Amenia, New York, that serves adolescents and young adults with learning differences.

== History and goals ==
Maplebrook School was founded in 1945 by Serena Merck, Marjorie Finger, and Sunny Barlow. These women were pursuing a vision of superior education for youngsters who learn differently and endeavored to create a disciplined environment where academic achievement is valued. Maplebrook's goal is to create a community which values the individual, nourishes trust and confidence, promotes respect and understanding, encourages participation and helps build character.

== Programs ==
Maplebrook offers educational programs both for high school students and for post-secondary studies. There are two post-secondary programs: the C.A.P.S Program – Center for the Advancement of Post Secondary Studies; and the T.L.C. Program – Transitional Living Center.

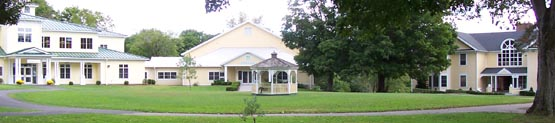
Maplebrook main campus

== Campus and facilities ==
Maplebrook is situated in the foothills of the Berkshire Mountains approximately 90 miles (140 km) north of New York City. The school consists of twenty-nine buildings in addition to tennis courts, a swimming pool and athletic fields spread throughout the campus.

=== Academic facilities ===
The academic complex contains seventeen classrooms, including a science laboratory, a home and consumer economics classroom, and two computer resource centers. The computer resource centers are fully equipped with new computers, printers, CD-ROM drives, and computer projection for large-group instruction. The facilities also include a bookstore, horticulture lab, woodworking shop and a library containing more than 7,000 volumes. In addition, there are several tutoring rooms, and offices for psychologists, speech and language therapists, chaplains, nurse, and other administrative personnel in addition to a student center, mail room, and a school store.

=== Athletic facilities ===
Outdoor facilities include tennis courts, basketball courts, a horse-back riding facility, and athletic fields for soccer, field hockey, and other team sports. In addition to the gymnasium, the campus boasts of a weight and fitness center and an indoor heated pool.

=== Dormitories and other facilities ===
Most academic students live with a roommate in one of the campus' four dormitories. There are lounge and study areas with access to computers within each of the dormitories. As with most private boarding schools, a faculty member resides on each floor in the dormitories and students eat their meals in the main dining hall.

== Students ==
As of 2008, about 115 students attended Maplebrook School. There were 74 students in the academic program (split evenly between boys and girls) and 40 students in the post-secondary programs. 7,400 students graduated by 2024. Approximately 95% of the students at the school lived on campus.

== Faculty ==
As of 2008 there were 34 teachers at Maplebrook, allowing for personalized interaction between students and teachers due to a student/teacher ratio of 2:1.

== Extracurricular activities ==
Every student is required to participate in three sports each academic year. In the Fall, students can participate in soccer, field hockey, cross-country, and equestrian activities. During the Winter the choices are basketball, cheerleading, swimming, skiing, and equestrian activities. In the Spring the activities are softball, track and field, tennis, and equestrian activities.

Intramural sports are also available throughout the academic year. Some intramural choices are floor hockey, volleyball, golf, hiking, cycling, and weight/fitness, though more options are available if there is sufficient interest in students.

== Accreditations ==
Maplebrook School is accredited by The New York State Association of Independent Schools (NYSAIS) and The Middle States Association of Colleges and Schools. Some students advance to higher education, and a few have earned four-year college degrees. But for most, the goal after Maplebrook is to live and work independently.
