= Joel Benton =

American writer, poet, and lecturer

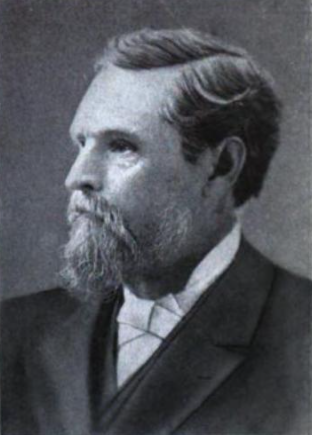
- Born: May 29, 1832; Amenia, New York, US
- Died: September 15, 1911 (aged 79); Poughkeepsie, New York, US
- Occupations: Poet; Writer; Lecturer
- Writing career
- Notable works: Emerson As A Poet; The Truth About Protection; Greeley on Lincoln; In the Poe Circle; The Life of Phineas T. Barnum

Joel Benton (May 29, 1832 – September 15, 1911) was an American writer, poet and lecturer.

== Biography ==
Benton was born in Amenia, Dutchess County, New York. He worked as a teacher, writer and lecturer.

As well as producing poetry, he wrote Emerson As A Poet (1882), The Truth About Protection (1892), Greeley on Lincoln (1893), In the Poe Circle: With Some Account Of The Poe-Chivers Controversy And Other Poe Memorabilia (1899) and The Life of Phineas T. Barnum.

He died in 1911 in Poughkeepsie.
