= Amenia (town), New York =

Amenia, New York
- Town
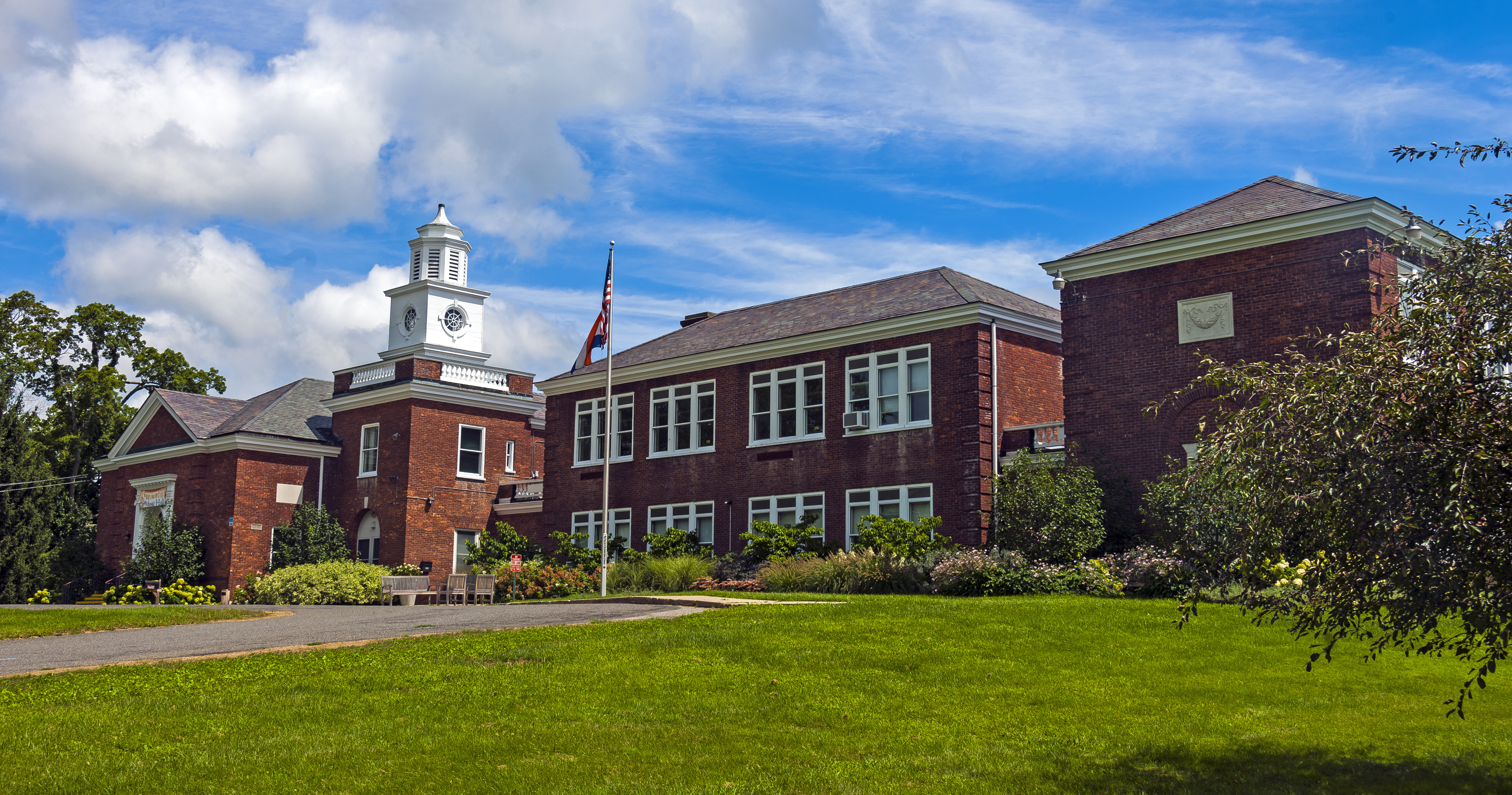
- Town hall

- Logo

- Location of Amenia, New York
- Coordinates: 41°50′49″N 73°33′17″W
- Country: United States
- State: New York
- County: Dutchess

Government
  - Type: Town Council
  - Town Supervisor: Victoria A. Perotti (R)

Area
  - Total: 43.61 sq mi (112.96 km^{2})
  - Land: 43.22 sq mi (111.94 km^{2})
  - Water: 0.40 sq mi (1.03 km^{2})
- Elevation: 568 ft (173 m)

Population (2020)
  - Total: 3,769
- Time zone: UTC-5 (Eastern (EST))
  - Summer (DST): UTC-4 (EDT)
- ZIP Codes: 12501 (Amenia); 12592 (Wassaic); 12522 (Dover Plains); 12545 (Millbrook)
- Area code: 845
- FIPS code: 36-027-01693
- GNIS feature ID: 0942425
- Website: www.ameniany.gov

Amenia is a town in Dutchess County, New York, United States. The population was 3,769 at the 2020 census, down from 4,436 at the 2010 census. The town is on the eastern border of the county.

== History ==
Amenia is one of the original towns formed by act of March 7, 1788. It comprises the width of the Oblong Tract, and the east tier of lots in the Great Nine Partners Patent.

Inhabitants prior to European incursion were Pequot, in a village on the west side of a pond they called Wequagnoch. Along with related Native Americans from Connecticut, they held Pow Wows on land both before and after the incorporation of the town. (Note: Contemporary research says that the Native Americans living on this land when Europeans arrived are more likely to have been Munsee Lenape, Mohican, and/or Schaghticoke. See Native Land)

In 1703 Richard Sackett was granted a patent for land along Wassaic Creek. As this land was already included in the previous Great Nine Partners Patent, Sackett's title was invalid. Sackett was also one of the partners in the Little Nine Partners Patent. He settled about one mile south of Wassaic at a site that was later called the "Steel Works", as furnace and foundry were established there during the Revolution to manufacture steel for the use of the army. There was a forge at that location as early as 1770.

In 1724 Captain Garret Winegar came to Amenia Union from East Camp in Columbia County, New York. The Winegars were among the Palatine families from the Middle Rhine that had settled in the Province of New York in 1710 under the sponsorship of Queen Anne. A second Palatine family, that of Johannes Rouh (Rowe), came to Hitchcock's Corner (Amenia Union) sometime prior to 1731. Samuel Hitchcock, for whom the hamlet was named, arrived in about 1757. Dr. Thomas Young lived at the "Corner" for several years and married a daughter of Captain Winegar. The town was named by Young, derived from Latin and meaning "pleasant to the eye".

The house of worship known as the "Red Meeting House" was built in 1758, and stood about a mile northeast of the village of Amenia. George Whitefield preached there in the summer of 1770. The Precinct of Amenia was established by act of the colonial legislature in 1762.

In the summer of 1778, a large number of prisoners - mostly Hessians, taken at the battle of Saratoga the year before - were marched through the town on their way to Fishkill Landing, where they crossed the Hudson. It is said that some of the Hessian soldiers solicited the people to aid them in escaping; a few succeeded, and remained in this country.

Jacob Bockee, a captain in the company in Col. Willet's Regiment, was a member of the Assembly in 1795 and 1797, where he introduced a bill for the abolition of slavery in the state. Most of the slaves in the town were manumitted in the manner and under the conditions prescribed by law. Owners were not permitted to make free and cast off any slave who was not capable of providing for himself. In 1824, three years before the institutional abolition of slavery in the state, there were 32 slaves in Amenia.

About the year 1812, a company was organized in this town for the manufacture of woolen goods, styled as the "Amenia Manufacturing Company" and owned by the Barker, Benton, Ingraham, Park, and Canfield families. Its factory was located on the banks of Webatuck Creek at Leedsville.

Amenia was officially named a town, in separation from the eponymous precinct, in 1788.

== Geography ==
According to the United States Census Bureau, the town has a total area of 43.6 square miles (113.0 km^{2}), of which 43.2 square miles (111.9 km^{2}) is land and 0.39 square miles (1.0 km^{2}), or 0.91%, is water. The town is drained by the Ten Mile River, a tributary of the Housatonic River. The Ten Mile River is formed in the southern part of the town by the confluence of Wassaic Creek (draining the western part of the town) and Webatuck Creek (draining the eastern part).

The eastern town line is the border of Connecticut. U.S. Route 44 crosses the northern part of the town.

== Demographics ==
Historical population
Census	Pop.	Note	%±
1820	3,114		—
1830	2,389		−23.3%
1840	2,179		−8.8%
1850	2,229		2.3%
1860	2,288		2.6%
1870	2,662		16.3%
1880	2,697		1.3%
1890	2,362		−12.4%
1900	2,374		0.5%
1910	2,123		−10.6%
1920	1,831		−13.8%
1930	1,969		7.5%
1940	6,873		249.1%
1950	7,481		8.8%
1960	7,546		0.9%
1970	7,842		3.9%
1980	6,299		−19.7%
1990	5,195		−17.5%
2000	4,048		−22.1%
2010	4,436		9.6%
2020	3,769		−15.0%
U.S. Decennial Census 2020

As of the census of 2000, there were 4,048 people, 1,625 households, and 1,074 families residing in the town. The population density was 93.5 inhabitants per square mile (36.1/km^{2}). There were 1,814 housing units at an average density of 41.9 per square mile (16.2/km^{2}). The racial makeup of the town was 93.40% White, 2.94% Black or African American, 0.59% Native American, 0.47% Asian, 0.77% from other races, and 1.83% from two or more races. Hispanic or Latino of any race were 3.36% of the population.

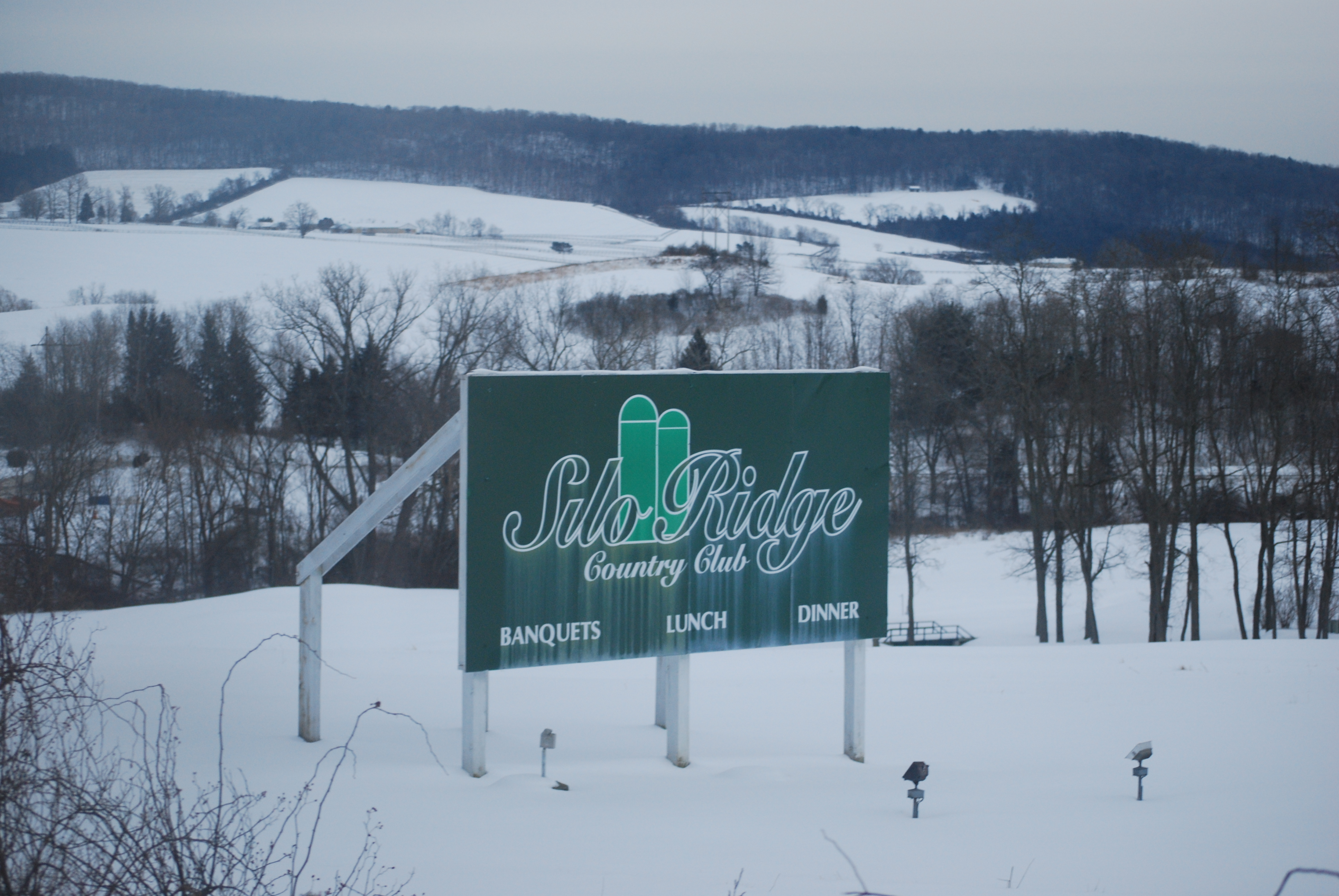
Silo Ridge Country Club in Amenia

There were 1,625 households, out of which 29.4% had children under the age of 18 living with them, 51.4% were married couples living together, 9.8% had a female householder with no husband present, and 33.9% were non-families. 27.9% of all households were made up of individuals, and 13.0% had someone living alone who was 65 years of age or older. The average household size was 2.46 and the average family size was 2.97.

In the town, the population was spread out, with 23.7% under the age of 18, 6.5% from 18 to 24, 27.6% from 25 to 44, 25.0% from 45 to 64, and 17.1% who were 65 years of age or older. The median age was 40 years. For every 100 females, there were 95.6 males. For every 100 females age 18 and over, there were 91.6 males.

The median income for a household in the town was $39,231, and the median income for a family was $51,294. Males had a median income of $32,038 versus $28,769 for females. The per capita income for the town was $22,095. About 3.4% of families and 8.1% of the population were below the poverty line, including 2.0% of those under age 18 and 12.7% of those age 65 or over.

== Education ==
=== Primary and secondary schools ===
The Webutuck Central Schools District serves the town of Amenia. The district serves pre-kindergarten to twelfth grade. Schools include Webutuck Elementary School, Eugene Brooks Intermediate School and Webutuck High School.

A private school serving the town is Maplebrook School. Maplebrook School is a small boarding school serving adolescents and young adults with learning differences.

=== Library ===
The Amenia Free Library serves Amenia. The library was founded in 1938 and has a collection of rare historical books.

== Infrastructure ==
=== Transportation ===
The main thoroughfare of Amenia is New York State Route 22. State Route 22 runs through every town on the east side of Dutchess County. U.S. Route 44 also passes through Amenia, intersecting Route 22 within the hamlet of Amenia. Metro-North Railroad has two rail commuter rail stations in Amenia, with service to New York City via the Harlem Line. The Tenmile River station is off Sinpatch Road east of Route 22, and the Wassaic station is 2 miles (3 km) north of Tenmile River. Trains leave every two hours during midday, evenings and weekends. In rush hour, peak-direction trains leave about every 30 minutes. There is no train service into or out of Amenia after midnight.

In 2006, the NYSDOT administered the repaving of Route 22 through the town of Dover, New York. The prime contractor was Callanan Industries, Inc., an Albany, New York based contractor. In 2007, repaving continued north from the town line into Amenia, New York with two other contractors - Peckham Road Corp. for paving in Wassaic and A. Colarusso & Son Inc., a Hudson, New York based contractor for the portion north of Wassaic.

== Notable people ==
- John Barlow (1872–1944), entomologist and college administrator
- Joel Benton (1832–1911), poet, resided in Amenia
- Catharine Paine Blaine (1829-1908), suffragist and teacher
- Gail Borden (1801-1874), inventor of condensed milk, established his first factory in Amenia
- Tom Brady and Gisele Bündchen; the couple built a home in Silo Ridge, located in Amenia.
- Michael Cole (born 1966), television broadcaster for World Wrestling Entertainment
- Joseph Cummings (1817-1890), president of Wesleyan University (1857-1875), president of Northwestern University (1881-1890)
- Obadiah German (1766–1842), born in Amenia, United States senator
- Erastus Otis Haven (1820-1881), bishop of the Methodist Church, formerly principal of Amenia Seminary (1846), president of the University of Michigan (1863-1869), president of Northwestern University (1869-1872), chancellor of Syracuse University (1874-1880)
- Samuel Herrick (1779–1852), born in Amenia, United States congressman from Ohio
- John Miller (1774–1862), born in Amenia, physician and congressman from New York
- Lewis Mumford (1895-1990), historian of science, lived and died in Amenia
- Peter C. Rhodes (1909-1965), reporter and writer
- Joel Elias Spingarn (1875-1939), educator, literary critic, and civil rights activist, lived in Amenia
- Frank Stella (born 1936), painter, resided in Amenia
- Benjamin Swift (1781-1847), U.S. congressman and U.S. senator
- Smith Thompson (1768-1848), justice on the US Supreme Court
- Charles Augustus Wheaton, (1809–1882) Abolitionist
- Thomas Young (1731–1777), physician, American Revolutionary patriot, participant in the Boston Tea Party

== Communities and locations in Amenia ==
- Amenia – A census-designated place and hamlet in the northeastern part of the town.
- Amenia Union – A hamlet on the eastern town line on the border with Connecticut.
- Leedsville – A location in the northeastern part of the town, east of Amenia (CDP).
- Sharon Station – A hamlet at the northern town line.
- Silo Ridge– An upscale development with a long development history.
- Smithfield – A hamlet on the town line in the northwestern part of the town.
- South Amenia – A hamlet at the junction of Routes 2 and 3 in the eastern part of the town.
- Wassaic – A hamlet in the south-central part of the town.
- Wassaic Creek – A stream on the western side of the town, passing through the community of Wassaic.

== Buildings in Amenia listed on the National Register of Historic Places ==
Buildings in Amenia listed on the National Register of Historic Places include:

- Beth David Synagogue
- Indian Rock Schoolhouse
- Lewis Mumford House
- Hendrik Winegar House
- St. Thomas Episcopal Church
