= State Route 343 (New York−Connecticut) =

Highway in New York and Connecticut

New York State Route 343 and Connecticut Route 343
- NY 343 and Route 343 highlighted in red and NY 980G in blue

Route information
- Maintained by NYSDOT and ConnDOT
- Length: 19.95 mi (32.11 km) NY 343: 18.45 mi; Route 343: 1.50 mi
- History: NY 343 assigned 1930; Route 343 assigned 1932

Major junctions
- West end: NY 82 in Millbrook, New York
- US 44 / NY 22 in Amenia, New York
- East end: Route 4 / Route 41 in Sharon, Connecticut

Location
- Country: United States
- States: New York, Connecticut
- Counties: New York: Dutchess; Connecticut: Litchfield

Highway system
- New York Highways; Interstate; US; State; Reference; Parkways
- Connecticut State Highway System; Interstate; US; State; SSR; SR; Scenic
← NY 342	New York	→ NY 344
← Route 341	Connecticut	→ Route 349

New York State Route 343 (NY 343) is a state highway located entirely within central Dutchess County, in the Hudson Valley region of the U.S. state of New York. It runs east–west from the intersection of NY 82 in the village of Millbrook to the town of Amenia, where it crosses the Connecticut state line and continues eastward as Route 343, a Connecticut state highway located entirely within the town of Sharon. Along the way, it has a 7.3-mile (11.7 km) concurrency with NY 22 from vicinity of the hamlet of Dover Plains to the hamlet of Amenia.

The entirety of modern Route 343 was originally the Dover branch of the Dutchess Turnpike. The turnpike, which was in operation from the early to the mid-19th century, was a major transportation route at the time, connecting several local communities to Litchfield County, Connecticut, and the city of Poughkeepsie. NY 343 was designated in 1930, connecting the hamlet of Amenia to the state line, but was relocated a few years later onto the portion of New York State Route 200 from South Millbrook to the hamlet of Dover Plains. The NY 200 designation was rerouted east of Millbrook on NY 343's original alignment. NY 343 absorbed NY 200 in the early 1940s, creating an overlap with NY 22 between Dover Plains and Amenia. The Connecticut portion of the highway was originally designated as part of Route 4; it was renumbered to Route 343 in 1932.

Several landmarks along the way include the Silo Ridge Country Club in the hamlet of Wassaic, Beekman Park in the hamlet of Amenia, and the Troutbeck Conference Center in the hamlet of Leedsville. When NY 343 crosses the state line, it becomes Connecticut's Route 343 and passes through more rural and residential areas. Route 343 stretches for 1.50 miles (2.41 km) into the town of Sharon, Connecticut, where it terminates at a junction with Route 4 and Route 41.

== Route description ==
=== NY 343 ===
NY 343 begins at an intersection with NY 82 (cosigned as U.S. Route 44 or US 44 until 2008) in the hamlet of South Millbrook, located within the village of Millbrook. The road heads eastward into the town of Washington, intersecting an old alignment of NY 82 and passing to the south of Millbrook Golf and Tennis Club. NY 343 continues past fields, residential homes, and farms. The highway passes south of the creek, Mill Brook, entering the hamlet of Littlerest, where it turns to the southeast at an intersection with County Route 99 (CR 99). At the intersection with CR 23, NY 343 again changes direction, this time to the northeast, and soon crosses Stone Church Brook in the hamlet of Mutton Hollow. Here, NY 343 changes directions a third time, traveling to the southeast once again towards the hamlet of Dover Plains.

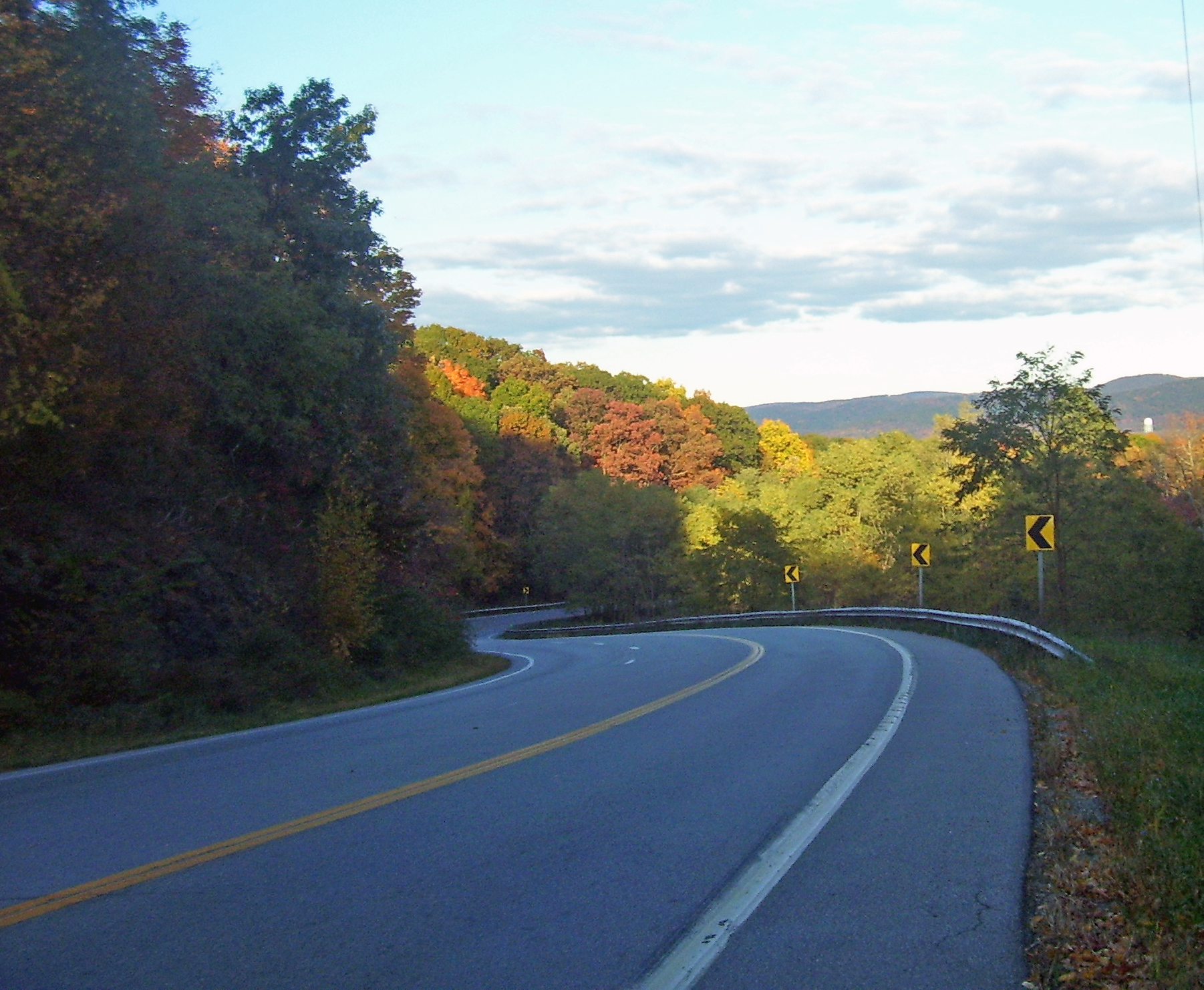
A view east into the Harlem Valley between Millbrook and Dover Plains

Northwest of Dover Plains, NY 343 turns to the northeast and passes into the town of Amenia. As it does so, it intersects reference route NY 980G, which is signed to service NY 22 southbound. Just east of the town line, NY 343 intersects NY 22. NY 343 turns north onto NY 22, and the joined routes pass to the west of a series of moderately-sized mountains as they head through regions of rural farms, fields and homes. The roads parallel the Tenmile River and soon intersect with CR 81 (a former routing of NY 22) south of the hamlet of Wassaic. After passing through Wassaic, the roads cross Wassaic Creek and enter a small valley, soon passing the Wassaic Train Station and continuing northward towards the hamlet of Amenia.

CR 81 merges with NY 22 and NY 343 as the main roads pass by Beekman Park and Silo Ridge Country Club in the hamlet of Amenia. The roads pass a pond and split at the intersection with US 44. US 44 and NY 22 continue to the north, and NY 343 continues eastward towards the state line. The road passes south of the Amenia Cemetery, changing directions several times. NY 343 soon intersects with CR 2 and turns to the northeast, passing over the Webatuck Creek. About 2 miles (3.2 km) later, NY 343 crosses the state line and enters Connecticut.

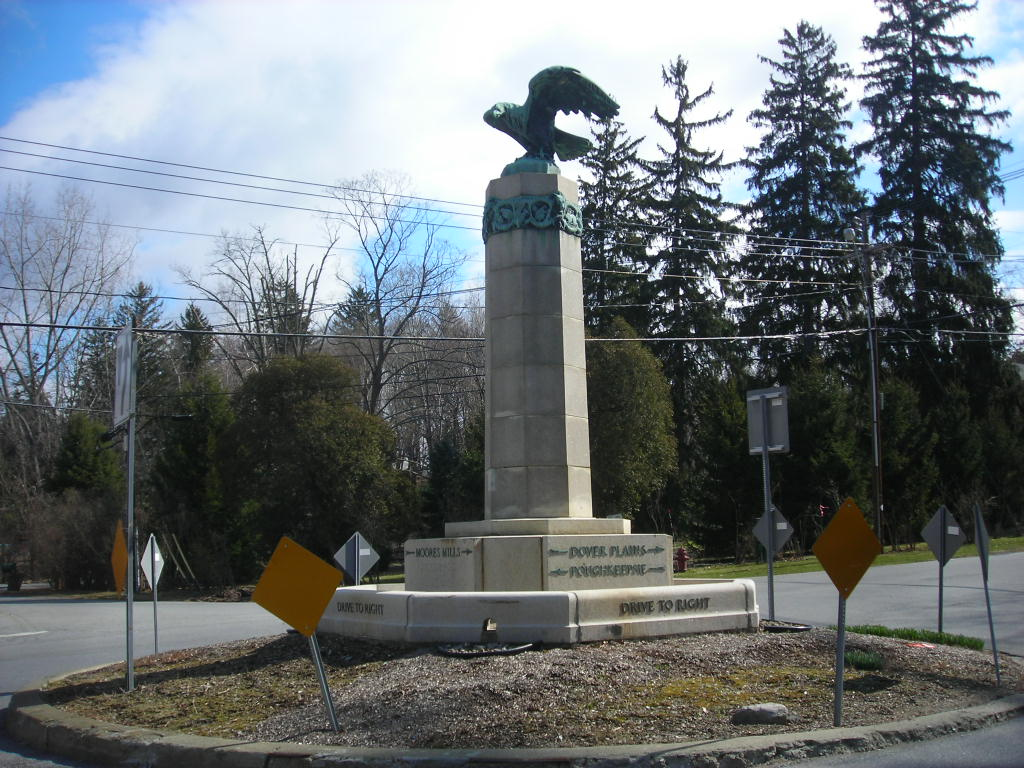
Monument denoting places in Dutchess County along NY 343 in Dover Plains

NY 343 is classified as a rural major collector road between Millbrook and Dover Plains and carries an average of about 3,100 vehicles per day (as of 2006), 5% of which is classified as truck traffic. The portion concurrent with NY 22 is a rural principal arterial road with average traffic of 5,600 per day (with 7% classified as truck traffic). East of NY 22, NY 343 is a rural minor arterial road carrying about 4,100 vehicles per day (with 6% classified as truck traffic).

=== Route 343 ===
When NY 343 crosses the state line into the town of Sharon, it enters a moderately rural area where a large factory is located. Route 343, known as Amenia Road, heads northeast towards the town center, passing through patches of forests and intersecting with Sharon Valley Road, a connector to Route 361. After passing north of Sharon Country Club, the highway turns east as it enters the town center, where the surroundings of the highway begin to become populated. Route 343 ends 1.5 miles (2.4 km) from the state line at an intersection with Route 4 (which also terminates at this intersection) and Route 41 south of the town green.

== History ==
=== Old roads ===
The alignment used by modern NY 343 was a major transportation route that passed through the colonial settlements of Wassaic and Amenia. The highway helped General George Washington's troops during the American Revolutionary War and was also the main supply route to the hamlets of Payne's Corners (now Amenia), Washiac (now Wassaic) and Dover Plains. Stone statues that marked the way to different places including New York City, Fishkill and Boston were put up along the road during the Revolution, helping suppliers of salt from Boston. This highway grew significantly over the years, with settlements growing along the highway during the early 19th century. There were also a few factories along the route, including a Borden Food Corporation factory that produced condensed milk in the 1860s.

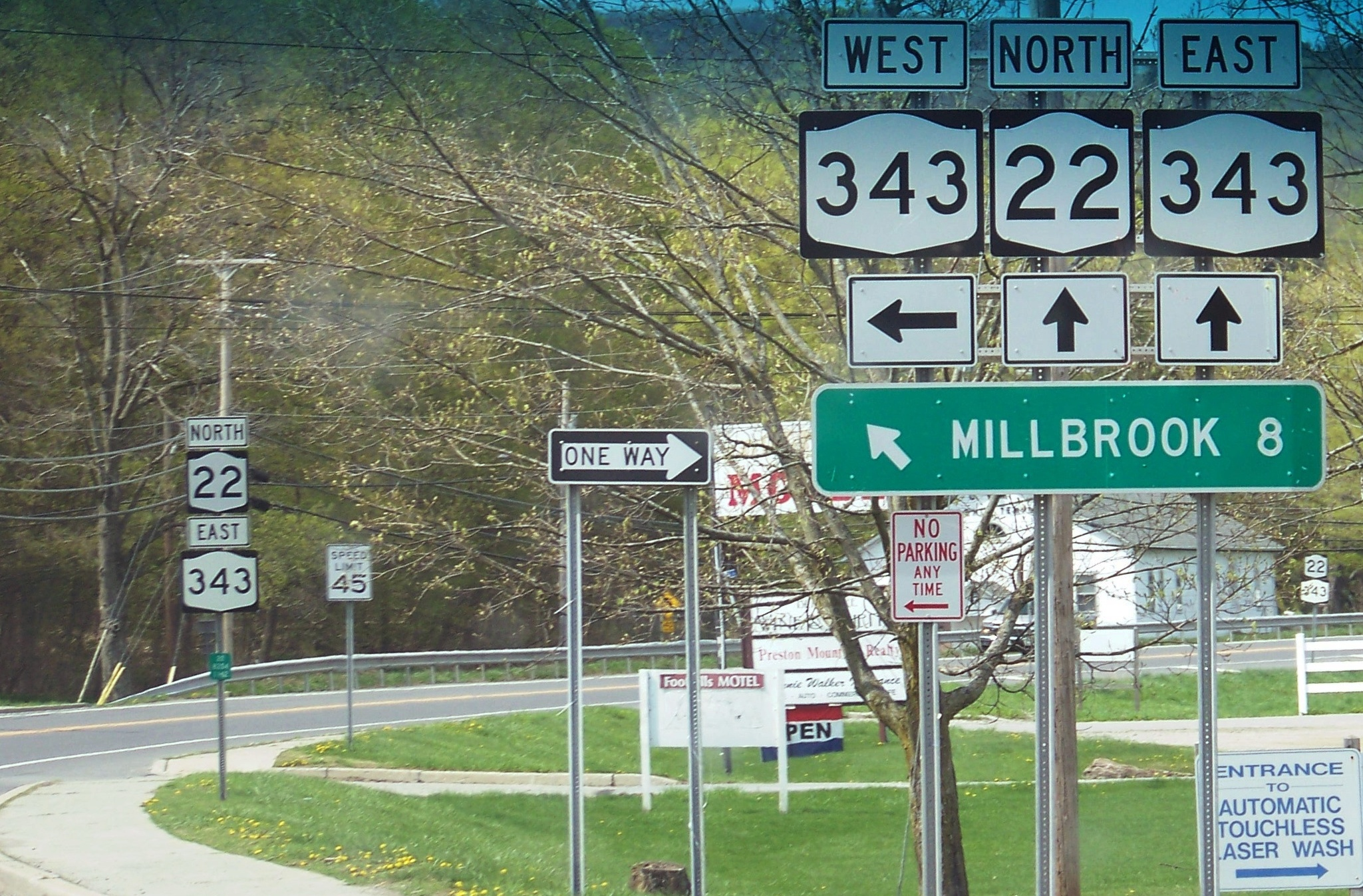
NY 343 and NY 22 concurrency near Dover, New York

NY 343 from the NY 22 / US 44 intersection in Amenia to the Connecticut state line was part of the main line of the Dutchess Turnpike, which ran from Poughkeepsie to the state line at Amenia, mostly along modern US 44. Prior to the building of the turnpike, the section of modern NY 343 east of Amenia to the state line was a swamp and did not connect Amenia to the state line. The turnpike corporation was established by law in April 1802 and finished grading the highway in 1805. In May 1803, the continuation of the Dutchess Turnpike into Connecticut, the Goshen and Sharon Turnpike, was also chartered. When the road was completed a few years later, it established a continuous, improved road between Poughkeepsie and Hartford. In 1806, a branch route, splitting off from the mainline at South Millbrook, was established to connect the hamlet of Dover Plains to Poughkeepsie. The southern branch used modern NY 343 from its western end at US 44 in South Millbrook to NY 22 in Dover Plains. The state took over maintenance of the turnpikes at the beginning of the 20th century.

=== Designation ===
In 1924, the main line of the Dutchess Turnpike was designated as NY 21, connecting the city of Poughkeepsie to the Connecticut state line as the original turnpike did. The road continued into Connecticut as Route 4, a highway that was part of the New England road marking system. In the 1930 state highway renumbering, old NY 21 was broken up into several state routes. The portion between NY 82A west of the hamlet of Amenia and the Connecticut state line in the town of Sharon was renumbered as NY 343. In 1932, the continuation of NY 343 in Connecticut was renumbered from Route 4 to Route 343 to match the New York route number.

As part of the 1930 renumbering, the Dover branch of the Dutchess Turnpike between modern NY 82 in the village of Millbrook and NY 22 north of the hamlet of Dover Plains was designated as part of NY 200, which began in the city of Poughkeepsie and went via Millbrook to the vicinity of Dover Plains. In 1934, NY 200 was rerouted replacing NY 343 from Milbrook through Amenia to Connecticut, while NY 343 was reassigned to the old route of NY 200 between the village of Millbrook and the hamlet of Dover Plains. US 44 was assigned in April 1935, resulting in the reconfiguration of several state routes in Dutchess County. One of the routes affected was NY 200, which was truncated. The section of NY 200 west of Amenia became part of the new US 44

The NY 200 designation was removed from the Amenia–Sharon road in the early 1940s and NY 343 was redesignated along that section. The two segments of NY 343 were connected via an overlap with NY 22, which remains to this day.

== Major intersections ==
State	County	Location	mi	km	Destinations	Notes
New York	Dutchess	Millbrook	0.00	0.00	NY 82 to US 44 – Poughkeepsie, Millbrook	Western terminus of NY 343; access to US 44 via NY 984P
New York	Dutchess	Town of Washington	7.12	11.46	To NY 22 south – Dover Plains	Access via NY 980G
New York	Dutchess	Town of Amenia	7.53	12.12	NY 22 south – Dover Plains	Western end of NY 22 concurrency
New York	Dutchess	Town of Amenia	14.92	24.01	US 44 / NY 22 north – Millbrook, Millerton	Eastern end of NY 22 concurrency; hamlet of Amenia
New York–Connecticut state line			18.45 0.00	29.69 0.00	Route transition	
Connecticut	Litchfield	Sharon	1.50	2.41	Route 4 east / Route 41 – Sharon, Hitchcock Corners, Amenia Union, Cornwall	Eastern terminus of Route 343; western terminus of Route 4
1.000 mi = 1.609 km; 1.000 km = 0.621 mi: Concurrency terminus; Route transition
