= Amenia (CDP), New York =

Hamlet in the state of New York, United States

Amenia, New York
- Census-designated place
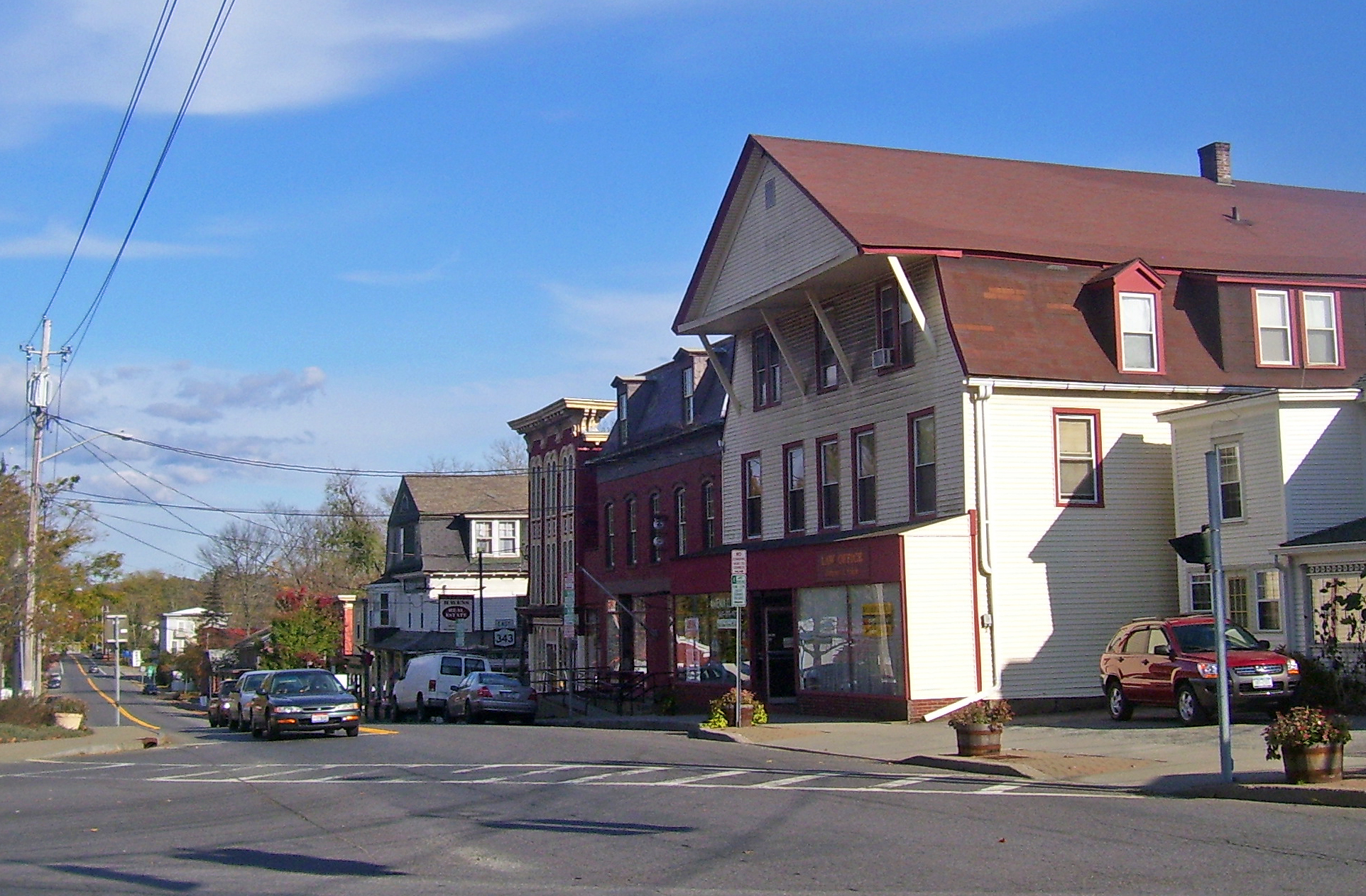
- East Main Street, downtown
- Etymology: Latin amoena ("pleasant to the eye")
- Location of Amenia, New York
- Coordinates: 41°50′49″N 73°33′17″W
- Country: United States
- State: New York
- County: Dutchess
- Town: Amenia

Area
  - Total: 1.24 sq mi (3.22 km^{2})
  - Land: 1.22 sq mi (3.15 km^{2})
  - Water: 0.027 sq mi (0.07 km^{2})
- Elevation: 568 ft (173 m)

Population (2020)
  - Total: 725
  - Density: 595.6/sq mi (229.95/km^{2})
- Time zone: UTC-5 (Eastern (EST))
  - Summer (DST): UTC-4 (EDT)
- ZIP code: 12501
- Area code: 845
- FIPS code: 36-01682
- GNIS feature ID: 0942425

Amenia is a hamlet and census-designated place (CDP) in Dutchess County, New York, United States. The population was 725 at the 2020 census. It is part of the Kiryas Joel–Poughkeepsie–Newburgh, NY Metropolitan Statistical Area as well as the larger New York–Newark–Bridgeport, NY-NJ-CT-PA Combined Statistical Area.

The hamlet of Amenia is in the town of Amenia on U.S. Route 44 at the junction of Routes 22 and 343.

== Geography ==
The community is near the border of Connecticut at 41°50′49″N 73°33′17″W (41.846984, -73.55474).

According to the United States Census Bureau, the CDP has a total area of 1.24 square miles (3.22 km^{2}), of which 1.22 square miles (3.15 km^{2}) is land and 0.027 square miles (0.07 km^{2}), or 2.19%, is water.

== Demographics ==
Historical population
Census	Pop.	Note	%±
2000	1,115		—
2010	955		−14.3%
2020	725		−24.1%
U.S. Decennial Census

As of the census of 2000, there were 1,115 people, 438 households, and 295 families residing in the CDP. The population density was 552.9 inhabitants per square mile (213.5/km^{2}). There were 478 housing units at an average density of 237.0 per square mile (91.5/km^{2}). The racial makeup of the CDP was 91.03% White, 3.32% Black or African American, 0.90% Native American, 0.72% Asian, 1.35% from other races, and 2.69% from two or more races. Hispanic or Latino of any race were 3.50% of the population.

There were 438 households, out of which 31.3% had children under the age of 18 living with them, 50.2% were married couples living together, 11.4% had a female householder with no husband present, and 32.6% were non-families. 25.8% of all households were made up of individuals, and 8.7% had someone living alone who was 65 years of age or older. The average household size was 2.51 and the average family size was 2.97.

In the CDP, the population was spread out, with 24.7% under the age of 18, 6.4% from 18 to 24, 30.3% from 25 to 44, 23.9% from 45 to 64, and 14.7% who were 65 years of age or older. The median age was 38 years. For every 100 females, there were 93.9 males. For every 100 females age 18 and over, there were 95.8 males.

The median income for a household in the CDP was $42,404, and the median income for a family was $50,700. Males had a median income of $30,845 versus $29,671 for females. The per capita income for the CDP was $22,944. About 2.3% of families and 6.5% of the population were below the poverty line, including none of those under the age of eighteen or sixty-five or over.

== Transportation ==
Roads are the major form of transportation through the hamlet of Amenia. There are four numbered highways that serve the community, including three state-maintained routes and one county route. The three state routes are New York State Route 22, New York State Route 343, and U.S. Route 44. The only county route in the hamlet is CR 81, an old alignment of NY 22 and NY 343. The Harlem Valley Rail Trail (along the former Harlem Line to Chatham passes through the hamlet, connecting it to the Wassaic train station of the Metro-North Harlem Line.
