= J. H. & C. S. Odell =

J.H. & C.S. Odell is the pipe organ building firm founded by John Henry and Caleb Sherwood Odell in New York City in 1859. To date the firm has built over 640 pipe organs, which can be found all over the world, though the majority of the firm's work can be found in the Northeast United States.

== History ==
Any discussion of the early work of the Odells must include the Robjohn brothers, Thomas and William. It was while working for Richard Ferris that the Odells met the Robjohns, who had both worked as organbuilders in England before coming to the United States.

Of the two brothers, Thomas Robjohn was the first to come to America. During the early nineteenth century he built many organs of his own, supplementing his income working for other New York organ builders. Prior to his work for the Odells, Thomas was probably best known for his work in completing the Firth and Hall organ for Trinity Church, Wall Street in 1840* as well as organs for South Dutch Church and Rutgers Street Presbyterian.

Thomas' brother William Robjohn had been a foreman for Gray and Davison in London, and emigrated in the late 1850s at the insistence of Thomas. Unfortunately, by 1860, the Robjohns had given up independent organbuilding due to financial difficulties and went to work for the Odells full-time as voicers, taking Levi Stewart with them when they left Richard Ferris. Indeed, the organ listed as Odell Opus 1 was actually commissioned to Thomas Robjohn, and its construction is credited to Stewart.

Despite fierce competition, the firm was well established by the end of 1860; in fact, the Odells seemed to enjoy a near-instant popularity, turning out an average of 10 to 12 organs a year by 1870. It has been argued that their early success came more from a tonal character "eminently suited to the late-nineteenth century taste."* rather than their solid and reliable mechanism or their many improvements to the control of the organ.

The original Odell factory at 407-409 West 42nd Street, New York City

It was at the 42nd Street works in Manhattan that the Odells built all of their mechanical action organs, and also where John Henry Odell conceived the tubular—pneumatic action system he patented in 1872 and 1898. As one of the only organ building firms to remain active in Manhattan past 1900, it is no coincidence that at one point, the Odells had over 200 organs up and playing in New York City.

Among the largest organs built by J.H. & C.S. Odell were: Temple Emmanu-El, Fifth Avenue and Forty-Third Street (Op. 386 IV/65, 1901), the Church of St. Nicholas, Fifth Avenue and Forty-Eighth Street (Op. 368, IV/50, 1899) and St. Joseph's Church, Albany, New York (Op. 483 IV/59, 1912).

The company operated from the works on west 42nd Street well after the turn of the century. By the time the company signed the contract for a new factory to be built in Mount Vernon in January 1928, the opus list had already grown to over 580 organs. Unfortunately this investment will ill-timed: the infamous 1929 stock market crash came 21 months later, and for the next few years production was a mere fraction compared to the boom of the teens and twenties.

== Depression era ==
After a steady and successful run of almost seventy years, the firm was almost completely wiped out by the financial ravages of the Great Depression. The company had invested heavily in the building of the new Mount Vernon factory, which it was forced to sell.

The company survived the years leading into the Second World War with some restoration and occasional new organ work. Operating out of a two floor shop on Morningside Avenue in Yonkers, the firm concentrated largely on maintenance, with nearly 300 service agreements in the New York metropolitan area.

From the postwar era to the 1970s, while the various neoclassical tonal movements threw the domestic organ building world into upheaval, the Odells labored in relative obscurity. In 1979 firm Director William H. Odell (son of Caleb H.) died, the result of major coronary failure. As manager and sole remaining voicer of the firm, William's death seriously diminished the abilities of the firm. In order to meet commitments to existing clients, the workload was distributed to third party contractors, some of whom tragically used the opportunity to further their own businesses, as well as help themselves to company resources, occasionally without compensation to the firm.

In an attempt to restructure, during the early 1980s the company was reorganized from a family proprietorship into a Corporation with elected officers selected from among family stockholders. It was in this fashion that William's youngest brother Harry Odell, acting as Director, made an effort to continue the firm. Regrettably, the inability of the firm leadership to reposition itself in accordance with market shifts, combined with the downward momentum from William's death proved too much to overcome. The Corporation was officially dissolved in 1983 and the major assets of the firm were sold.

Contrary to some anecdotal history of this period, the title of the firm always remained property of the family. In point of fact, the company never truly shut down; it instead continued to operate with a small roster or service clients, much as it did during the prewar years. Title of the firm officially passed from Harry Odell to his eldest son Edward in 1993.

== A new beginning ==
It was almost a decade before Harry's eldest son Edward was old enough to envision a proper revival of the family's legacy.

Edward had worked with his father and uncle throughout his youth had inherited a true passion for the organbuilder's art. Fresh out of college in the early 1990s, his enthusiasm was not quite enough to overcome the demands of reestablishment of the firm. Certain legal issues arose during that decade, including the unauthorized use of the firm name by a former employee. Once this was dealt with, the revived firm reacquired what remained of the original records. These records were copied, catalogued and compiled into a new database before being placed with the American Organ Archives at Talbott Library, at Westminster Choir College located in Princeton, NJ.

In the intervening years, Edward sought employment with Austin Organs, Inc. of Hartford, Connecticut, serving as Console Department Foreman in the final three of his seven years there, all the while maintaining J.H. & C.S. Odell as a part-time business. In December 2002 Edward left Austin to transition the Odell firm to a full-time concern with suitable resources and facilities for complete pipe organ manufacture. The new shop is fully equipped with a complete milling and cabinetmaking shop, pipe shop, voicing room and finishing room.

Since 2002, work has been broad in scope. At least 3 new organs and a significant number of restoration projects have been completed since establishing the new facility in Connecticut.
