= Taylan =

- Gender: Male

Origin
- Language: Turkish
- Meaning: Tall

Taylan is a masculine Turkish given name. In Turkish, "Taylan" means "gracious", and/or "tall and skinny person".

== People ==
=== Given name ===
- Taylan Antalyalı (born 1995), Turkish footballer
- Taylan Aydoğan (born 1983), Turkish-German footballer
- Taylan Yıldız (born 1980), Turkish politician
- Mustafa Taylan Özgür (born 1948, died 1969), Turkish political activist
- Taylan Dalveren (born 1978), Turkish - American Inventor, Engineer

=== Surname ===
- Ahmet Mümtaz Taylan (born 1965), Turkish film, television and theater actor and director
- Justin Taylan (born 1977), American author and historian
- Muhittin Taylan (1910–1983), Turkish judge
- Nurcan Taylan (born 1983), Turkish female Olympic, world and European champion weightlifter
- The Taylan Brothers, Durul Taylan (born 1969) and Yağmur Taylan (born 1966), Turkish film directors

== Places ==
- Taylan, a village in Kyrgyzstan
