= Syler =

Syler is a surname. Notable people with the surname include:

- Chris Syler (born 1986), American born Bolivian singer-songwriter, composer, and television personality
- James Syler (born 1961), American music composer
- Rene Syler (born 1963), American broadcast television journalist and author
