= Keith W. Olson =

American historian (1931–2024)

Keith W. Olson (4 August 1931 – 8 June 2024) was an American historian, lecturer and author, who specialized in twentieth-century political history in the United States. Born in Poughkeepsie, New York, Olson graduated Franklin D. Roosevelt High School in nearby Hyde Park in 1949. After a two-year stint in the US Army, Olson went to and graduated from the State University at Albany with a Bachelor (1957) and Master of Arts (1959) in history then continued his education, earning a Ph.D. in history from the University of Wisconsin-Madison in 1964. He first taught history as a lecturer at Syracuse University, before a 48-year teaching career at the Department of history at the University of Maryland-College Park. Following his retirement in 2014, Olson became a professor of history Emeritus at the University of Maryland, and he was a guest lecturer at the University of Vermont and continued writing and researching topics in US presidential history.

"The G.I Bill, the Veterans, and the Colleges" is Olson's most notable book, earning him second-place for the Frederick Jackson Turner Award from the Organization of American Historians and was among the "100 Classic Books on Higher Education" (2001). Olson notably wrote, "Watergate: The Presidential Scandal that Shook America", because of his expertise in United States presidential history.

Other published works by Olson included numerous essays, articles and reviews and has appeared on radio and television, including the History Channel and C-SPAN, discussing twentieth-century United States presidential history. Professor Olson also served as a Fulbright Program Professor three times in Finland and named an honorary member of the Finnish Historical Society, receiving an honorary Ph.D. from the University of Tampere, Finland in May 2000.
