= North Park Elementary School =

North Park Elementary School may refer to:

- North Park Elementary School (San Bernardino, California) - San Bernardino City Unified School District
  - 2017 North Park Elementary School shooting
- North Park Elementary School (Valencia, California) - Saugus Union School District
- North Park Elementary School (Hyde Park, New York) - Hyde Park Central School District
