= Hyde Park Elementary School =

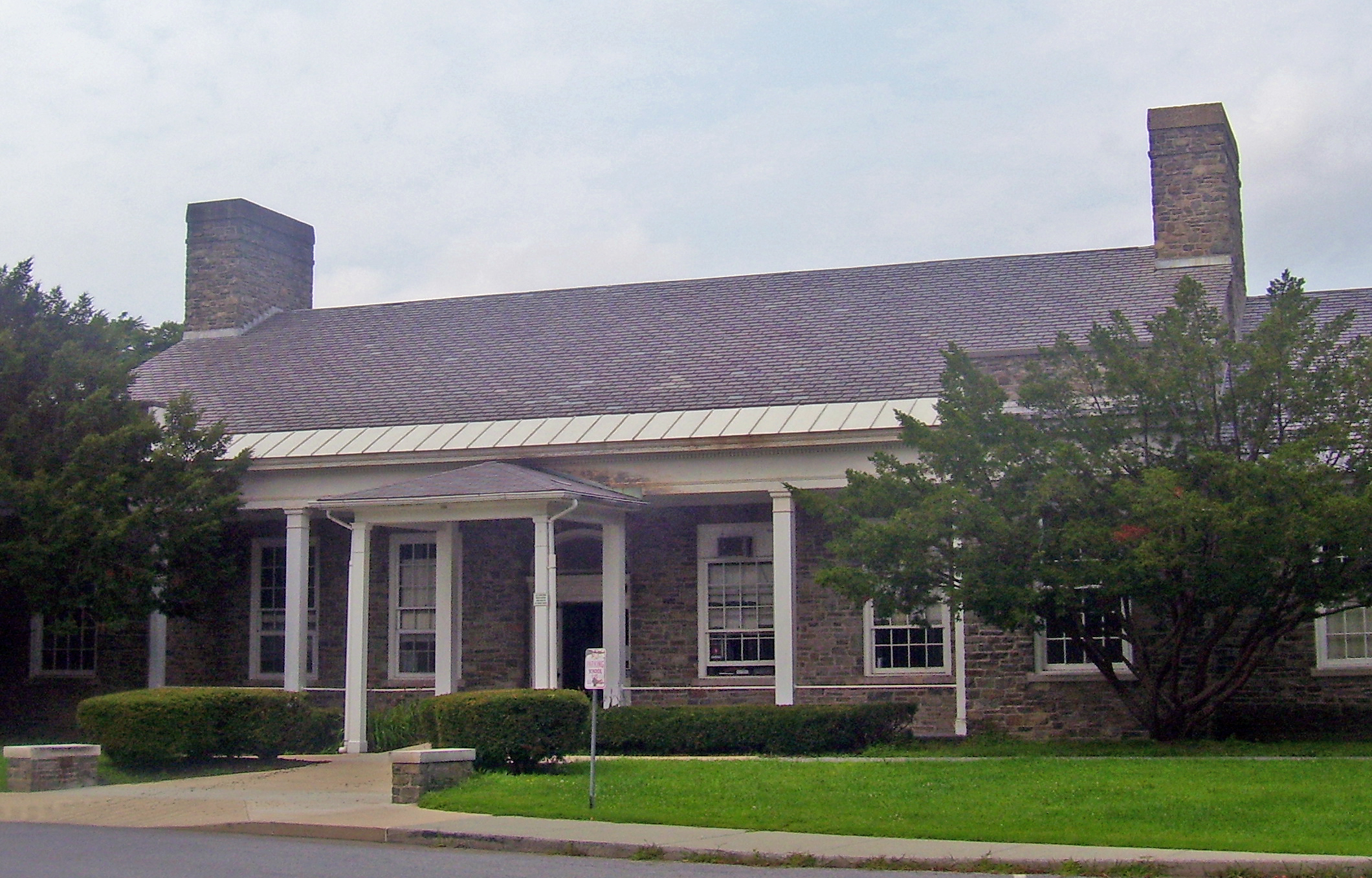
- Front entrance of school building

Location
- U.S. 9 Hyde Park, NY 12538; United States; 41°47′12″N 73°56′08″W

Information
- School type: Public school, Elementary
- Opened: 1940
- School district: Hyde Park Central Schools
- Principal: Kate Blossom
- Staff: 22
- Grades: K-5
- Gender: Coed
  - Kindergarten: 42
  - Grade 1: 55
  - Grade 2: 36
  - Grade 3: 52
  - Grade 4: 40
  - Grade 5: 48
- Average class size: 20
- Student to teacher ratio: 13
- Campus type: Suburban
- Communities served: Hyde Park
- Added to NRHP: 1993
- Reference #: 93000860
- Website: HPE Home Page

Hyde Park Elementary School is located on US 9 in Hyde Park, New York, United States. It served students from kindergarten through fifth grade in the Hyde Park Central Schools.

The school's original fieldstone building was built in 1940, after close consultation between the local school board and President Franklin Delano Roosevelt, a native of Hyde Park. He helped make federal funds available for construction, in order to promote the use of fieldstone, following the Hudson Valley's Dutch Colonial architectural heritage. In 1993 the school building was listed on the National Register of Historic Places.

It was closed and no longer used as an elementary school as of June 2012. The historic building now houses part of the district Universal Pre-K program, Pupil Services Offices, and the Technical Services Department.

== History ==
Roosevelt had a longtime interest in the region's stone Dutch buildings, owing to his own heritage. In 1927 he had made sure that the new Hyde Park library, which his family had donated money for, was built of fieldstone. Later, as president, he chose a demolished colonial house as the model for Hyde Park's new post office, after successfully pushing for similar post offices in neighboring Poughkeepsie and Rhinebeck.

In 1938 he met privately with members of the Hyde Park school board and other local officials at his family home in town. He had closely followed their need for an elementary school, and proposed to them that the Public Works Administration (PWA) make federal money available to Hyde Park for the construction of three schools (now Violet Avenue Elementary School and the first Franklin D. Roosevelt High School, now Haviland Middle School) that would centralize the smaller local districts into one large one.

The PWA eventually picked up 45% of the construction costs. The president insisted on the use of fieldstone for the elementary school despite heavy lobbying for brick from the local bricklayer's union, believing that institutional architecture in the Hudson Valley should reflect a continuity with its traditional styles and construction methods. He personally approved architect Ross Sluyter's design before construction began, and spoke at the dedication ceremony for all three schools when they opened in 1940.

At that time the school consisted of its current central block, a single-story seven-bay rectangle in a randomly coursed ashlar pattern with a slate-shingled gable roof pierced by two brick chimneys. It stood in the middle of a 7-acre (2.8 ha) lot. Smaller wings project from all sides save the west, still the building's main entrance. It opens to a classic Colonial Revival center-hall plan, with much of the original finishes remaining.

In 1957, it was necessary to expand the building as the baby boom generation began to hit school age. A flat-roofed brick classroom wing was built on the southwest corner, with a two-story gym wing extending from its north. The auditorium/gymnasium was converted into the cafeteria, ending a need for students living nearby to eat at home due to crowding. The original cafeteria is now the school's main special education classroom. In 1963 these additions were completed. Another wing was added in 1990 for county BOCES (Board of Cooperative Educational Services) use

== Closing ==
Due to declining student enrollment in the district, it was closed at the end of the 2011-2012 school year. Former students now attend North Park Elementary or Ralph R. Smith Elementary Schools. The school is used for the pupil services administrative offices, the technical services department, district operated pre-kindergarten classes, and a childcare service.
