= Aaron Kuffner =

New York artist

- Born: New York City, NY, US
- Notable work: Gamelatron
- Movement: Conceptual Art
- Website: http://aarontaylorkuffner.com

Aaron Taylor Kuffner (born 1975, New York City) is an American conceptual artist living and working in New York.

== Early life and education ==
Kuffner was born and raised in New York City. He attended Franklin D. Roosevelt High School in Hyde Park, New York and briefly studied visual and performing arts at Syracuse University before dropping out and relocating to Brooklyn in 1996.

Kuffner is a trained painter and metal sculptor, a former street artist, theatre director, international DJ and music producer. Kuffner studied at the Institut Seni Inodenesia Yogyakarta, where he studied Karawitan and Ethnomusicology. While living in Indonesia he learned to play the Indonesian instrument, Gamelan, which would prove instrumental to his future work.

== Work ==
Kuffner is known for using sculpture, electronic music, installation, and engineering in his art.

In 2008 Kuffner completed the Gamelatron, which "uses technology, sound, sculpture, and engineering to create a visceral experience based on acoustic resonance and robotic technology."

The Gamelatron is made with the ancient Indonesian bronze gongs, Gamelan, that Kuffner has retrofitted with mechanical mallets and is controlled by micro-processors in each instrument.

Kuffner work ties the old with the new, combining ancient instruments with new technology to create a previously unheard auditory experience.

"I see technology in a greater sense - not just digital technology, but anything from smelting bronze to machining metals - as something that humans always incorporate into our lives and in turns contributes to shaping our culture," said Kuffner. "Art has always been made from the tools and resources available to the artist. In this moment in history these are the tools that are available to me - so that is what I use."

Kuffner's work has primarily resided in the underground art scene with installation appearing in features for The New York Times and other publications. More recently his work has begun to reach a wider audience with the growth of the festival Burning Man. Notably with the Gamelatron featured in the Renwick Gallery at the Smithsonian Institution for their show, "No Spectators: The Art of Burningman".

== Exhibitions ==
Kuffner's installations have been exhibited by the Renwick Gallery at the Smithsonian Institution, Washington D.C., Hammer Museum in Los Angeles, California (2017); the Drawing Center, New York (2016); 56th Venice Biennale at the Palazzo Grimani Museum Venice (2015); The Sackler Gallery at the Smithsonian Institution, Washington D.C. (2013); and The Clocktower Gallery, New York (2012).
