= Vanderbilt Lane Historic District =

Historic district in New York, United States

- U.S. National Register of Historic Places
- U.S. Historic district
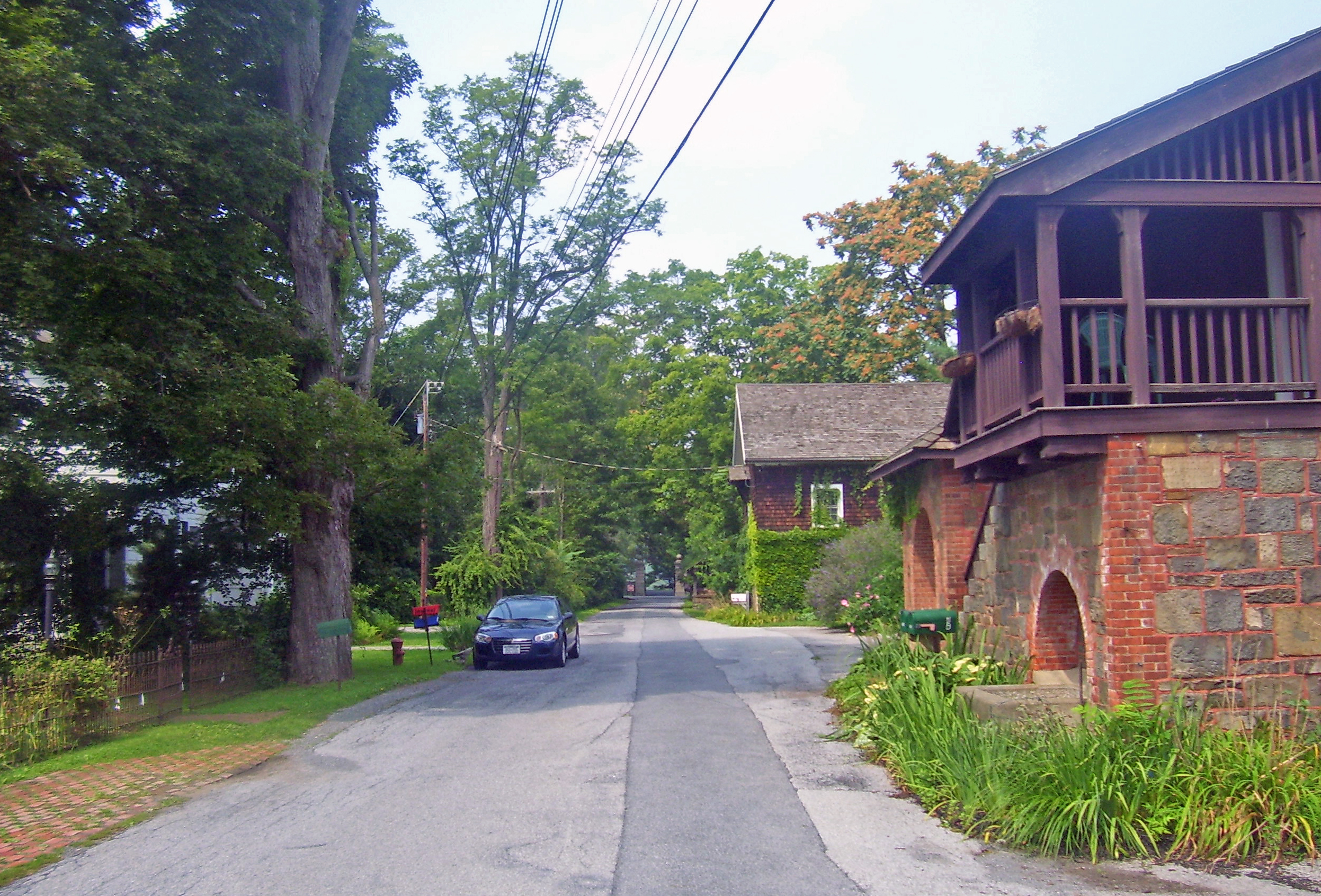
- South portion of barn complex and superintendent's house, 2008

- Location within New York Location within the United States
- Location: Hyde Park, New York
- Nearest city: Poughkeepsie
- Coordinates: 41°48′07″N 73°56′12″W
- Area: 10 acres (4.0 ha)
- Built: 1830-1901
- Architectural style: Federal, Shingle
- NRHP reference No.: 93000855
- Added to NRHP: 1993

The Vanderbilt Lane Historic District is a small area along the street of the same name, just east of US 9 in Hyde Park, New York, United States. It was used for the farm functions of the nearby estate of Walter Langdon and, later, Frederick Vanderbilt. Most of its buildings date to the turn of the 19th century, with one remaining from the 1830s.

Many of its buildings and infrastructure remain intact. It is one of only two estate farm complexes on the east side of the Hudson that has not been razed and redeveloped. In 1993 it was recognized as a historic district and added to the National Register of Historic Places.

== Geography ==
The district is composed of some larger lots on the north corner of the Route 9 junction, and some to the southeast of those, across the street. It is a 10-acre (4 ha) area with ten total contributing properties: five buildings, one structure (a well) and three objects (a gated stone wall and two fire hydrants).

All the lots are developed. The area nevertheless retains a pastoral quality, since the houses and buildings are small-scale frame, stone and brick constructions in the Federal or Shingle architectural styles. There is plenty of room for the large shade trees, lawns and landscaping. Vanderbilt Lane, which begins at Route 9 just opposite one of the lesser gates to the Vanderbilt estate, is also narrow, more like a driveway than a through street.

There are two properties on the north side of the lane: the superintendent's house, a clapboard-sided one-story five-bay building on the west near Route 9, and a barn complex, partially destroyed by a past fire. On the south are a Federal-style frame herdsman's house, a shingle-sided coach house and a creamery.

== History ==
When Vanderbilt bought the estate in 1895, the farm complex across what was then just the Albany Post Road was in disrepair. The herdsman's house, an 1830 one-and-half-story five-bay rectangular frame building with gabled asphalt-shingled roof, was built when Robert Langdon owned the property. It is the oldest building in the district and the only one whose location there precedes Vanderbilt's ownership of the land.

Vanderbilt had the buildings on the north side constructed on the site of older counterparts. The architect is not known but it is likely that he hired McKim, Mead & White, which had designed not only his mansion but a nearby house for his secretary, for the job. They were completed in 1901.

The buildings the firm responded with are distinctive for their mix of exterior texture. The barn complex employs many aspects of the Shingle style, not only the wood shingle siding but the conical towers, rusticated stone ends, and cross-gabled roofs. The superintendent's house likewise uses much exposed wood. The creamery, across the street, is the most distinctive property in the district, a stone building with a hipped roof covered in wood shingles and pierced by a brick chimney.

In 1905, Vanderbilt had the coach house, originally part of the neighboring Sexton estate that stood just south of the superintendent's house, moved to the east in two sections. He used it to house his Belgian thoroughbred horses.

After Vanderbilt's death in 1938, his niece was persuaded to donate the mansion to the federal government for eventual use as a historic site. The Vanderbilt Lane properties were separated and subdivided at that time, all eventually being converted for residential use. They have been minimally altered since then.
