= Angela Fraleigh =

American artist

- Born: 1976 (age 49–50); Beaufort, SC
- Education: Boston University (BFA), Yale University (MFA)
- Website: www.angelafraleigh.com

Angela Fraleigh (born 1976) is a contemporary American artist. Her oil paintings explore themes such as gender, sexuality, femininity, and power dynamics, in a style that weaves together realism, abstraction, and classical influences.

== Biography and education ==
Fraleigh was born in 1976 in Beaufort, South Carolina, and raised in rural Hyde Park, New York, where she attended Franklin Delano Roosevelt High School. She later received her BFA in painting from Boston University, where she graduated magna cum laude, and her MFA in painting from the Yale University School of Art. Fraleigh is a full professor in the Art Department at Moravian College. She currently resides and works in New York, New York, and Allentown, Pennsylvania, where she lives with her husband, artist Wesley Heiss, and their daughters, Tuesday and Sagan.

== Work ==
Fraleigh works primarily with paint, although she has exhibited works in a variety of additional mediums, including drawing and sculpture. The process of creating her complex, layered paintings varies and often involves a balance between control and chance. One way of working used by Fraleigh involves rendering her figures using a traditional approach, then placing the canvas horizontally and introducing the element of chance through pours of paint over the surface of the work.

Fraleigh has been described as a "painterly painter," creating tactile and flowing surfaces in her figurative paintings where forms are often obscured. Speaking about the experience of viewing Fraleigh's work, Curator of the Menil Collection Michelle White has said "When you stand in front of her work, she maintains the magical and seductive qualities of oil on canvas and makes it impossible to deny the potential for paint to function as political weapon."

Many of Fraleigh's paintings rework well-known compositions by Old Masters, and in the process, the artist stages feminist interventions by giving the women who traditionally played peripheral roles more narrative agency. In her essay on Fraleigh's 2016 exhibition, Angela Fraleigh: Between Tongue and Teeth, at the Everson Museum of Art, Cynthia Hazen Polsky and Leon Polsky Curator of Contemporary Art at The Metropolitan Museum of Art Kelly Baum, wrote that "Through her many subtractions and additions, modifications and adjustments to Baroque and Rococo paintings, therefore, Fraleigh renders her female subjects both autonomous and heroic, thereby rectifying centuries of artistic misogyny." Of these all-female communities and relationships present in Fraleigh's artwork, Baum has noted that her paintings "serve as utopic provocations of the best sort: counter or oppositional narratives that allow us to imagine different pasts and different futures."

In 2014, Angela Fraleigh released a collection of several paintings called the “Ghosts in the Sunlight” in which she explains that she took the lead women who are subjected to the male gaze and then flipped the script. In an interview with the morning news, Fraleigh was asked where to find these women, to which she replies with the various paintings (Diana After the Hunt, and The Rape of Europa) made by male artists, Francois Boucher and Titian, and said that the women in the original painting were subjected to the male gaze since they were painted by artists with the reoccurring “...theme of beauty and pleasure with hints of refusal and fear.” Fraleigh wondered if it was possible to reshape the models' history and be able to give back their bodily autonomy “...even if they are not here anymore.” Thus began her desire to “re-envision” those paintings and give the women models their power back.

Set in abstracted backgrounds that reveal her interest in creating new spaces for her female figures to come together, Fraleigh's characters no longer exist in the past and instead become a vehicle for the artist to explore both the contemporary lives of women and their roles throughout history, like the role of women as objects in art. In her essay on Fraleigh's work, "Erotic Power and the Subversion of Myth," feminist writer and educator Jennifer Tyburczy writes that Fraleigh's work may be seen as a response to the prevalence of the eroticized female nude in art." The subversion of the male gaze is a common theme in Fraleigh's paintings, yet sexuality is never entirely absent in these works, and is explored alongside "other kinds of desire that can exist between women, like friendship, love, camaraderie, and tenderness."

More recently, Fraleigh has created a number of site-specific series, which has led to collaborative projects with institutions like the Edward Hopper House Museum & Study Center, the Vanderbilt Mansion National Historic Site, and the Weatherspoon Art Museum where she mines their collections for the invisible or marginalized stories within.
