= Frank Cimorelli =

American baseball player (born 1968)

- Pitcher
- Born: August 2, 1968 (age 58); Poughkeepsie, New York, U.S.
- Batted: Right Threw: Right

MLB debut
- April 30, 1994, for the St. Louis Cardinals

Last MLB appearance
- July 18, 1994, for the St. Louis Cardinals

MLB statistics
- Win–loss record: 0–0
- Earned run average: 8.78
- Strikeouts: 1
- Stats at Baseball Reference

Teams
- St. Louis Cardinals (1994)

Frank Thomas Cimorelli (born August 2, 1968) is an American former Major League Baseball pitcher. Cimorelli played for the St. Louis Cardinals in 1994.

== Biography ==
Cimorelli attended Franklin Delano Roosevelt High School in Hyde Park, New York, where he was teammates with Jeff Pierce. He played shortstop in high school and middle infield at Dutchess Community College on days when he was not pitching. At Dutchess, he batted .340 as a sophomore and won seven games as a pitcher. In his only season at Dominican College, he was an honorable mention NAIA All-American. He was drafted in the 37th round of the 1987 Major League Baseball draft, signed for the minimum salary and received a signing bonus of $1,000.

In 1992, Cimorelli set a Minor League Baseball record for pitchers with 65 consecutive games without committing an error. Cimorelli spent five seasons in the minors, including three uninterrupted years with the Springfield Cardinals, before making his Major League debut against the Houston Astros on April 30, 1994. In his final Major League appearance on July 18, 1994, he surrendered four earned runs in a third of an inning against the Houston Astros, setting the stage for the biggest comeback in the history of the Astrodome.
