= Hyde Park (CDP), New York =

Census-designated place in New York, United States

Hyde Park, New York
- Census-designated place
- Location of Hyde Park, New York
- Coordinates: 41°47′05″N 73°55′59″W
- Country: United States
- State: New York
- County: Dutchess
- Town: Hyde Park

Area
  - Total: 1.24 sq mi (3.22 km^{2})
  - Land: 1.24 sq mi (3.22 km^{2})
  - Water: 0 sq mi (0.00 km^{2})
- Elevation: 187 ft (57 m)

Population (2020)
  - Total: 1,925
  - Density: 1,549.4/sq mi (598.22/km^{2})
- Time zone: UTC-5 (Eastern (EST))
  - Summer (DST): UTC-4 (EDT)
- ZIP code: 12538
- Area code: 845
- FIPS code: 36-37198
- GNIS feature ID: 0953559

Hyde Park is a hamlet and census-designated place (CDP) in the town of Hyde Park, Dutchess County, New York, United States. Its population was 1,908 as of the 2010 census.

The hamlet of Hyde Park is on the western side of the town of Hyde Park, bordered on the west by the Hudson River. The northern edge of the hamlet is Crum Elbow Creek, a tributary of the Hudson. On the north side of the creek, just outside the hamlet, is the Vanderbilt Mansion National Historic Site. The Springwood Estate, preserved as the Home of Franklin D. Roosevelt National Historic Site, is just outside the hamlet to the south.

U.S. Route 9 passes through the center of the hamlet, leading north 5 miles (8 km) to Staatsburg and south 6 miles (10 km) to Poughkeepsie, the county seat.

== Geography ==
According to the U.S. Census Bureau, the Hyde Park CDP has an area of 1.2 square miles (3.1 km^{2}), all land.

== Demographics ==
Historical population
Census	Pop.	Note	%±
2020	1,925		—
U.S. Decennial Census

== Government ==
Contrary to popular belief, the Hyde Park CDP is not a village due to the lack of a village government (mayor, village board, etc.).

== Education ==
The school district for the Hyde Park hamlet is Hyde Park Central School District. The school district's comprehensive high school is Franklin Delano Roosevelt High School.
