= Franklin Delano Roosevelt High School (Hyde Park, New York) =

Location
- 156 South Cross Road; Hyde Park, NY 12538; 41.826°N 73.902°W

Information
- Type: Public
- Motto: President's Pride!
- Established: 1940
- School district: Hyde Park Central School District
- Principal: Mike Ruella
- Faculty: 90.82 (on an FTE basis)
- Grades: 9 to 12
- Enrollment: 1,138 (2024–2025)
- Student to teacher ratio: 12.34
- Color: Green Gold
- Mascot: Presidents
- Team name: Presidents
- Website: https://fdr.hpcsd.org/

Franklin Delano Roosevelt High School is a public high school located in Hyde Park, New York in Dutchess County. Named for President Franklin D. Roosevelt, who grew up in Hyde Park, the school serves about 1,138 students in grades 9 to 12 in the Hyde Park Central School District.

Census-designated places (counted in New York as Hamlets) in the school district, of which Roosevelt is the sole comprehensive high school, include Haviland, Hyde Park, Marist College, Salt Point, and Staatsburg. The district includes most of the Town of Hyde Park and extends into the following towns: Clinton, Pleasant Valley, Poughkeepsie, and Rhinebeck.

== History ==
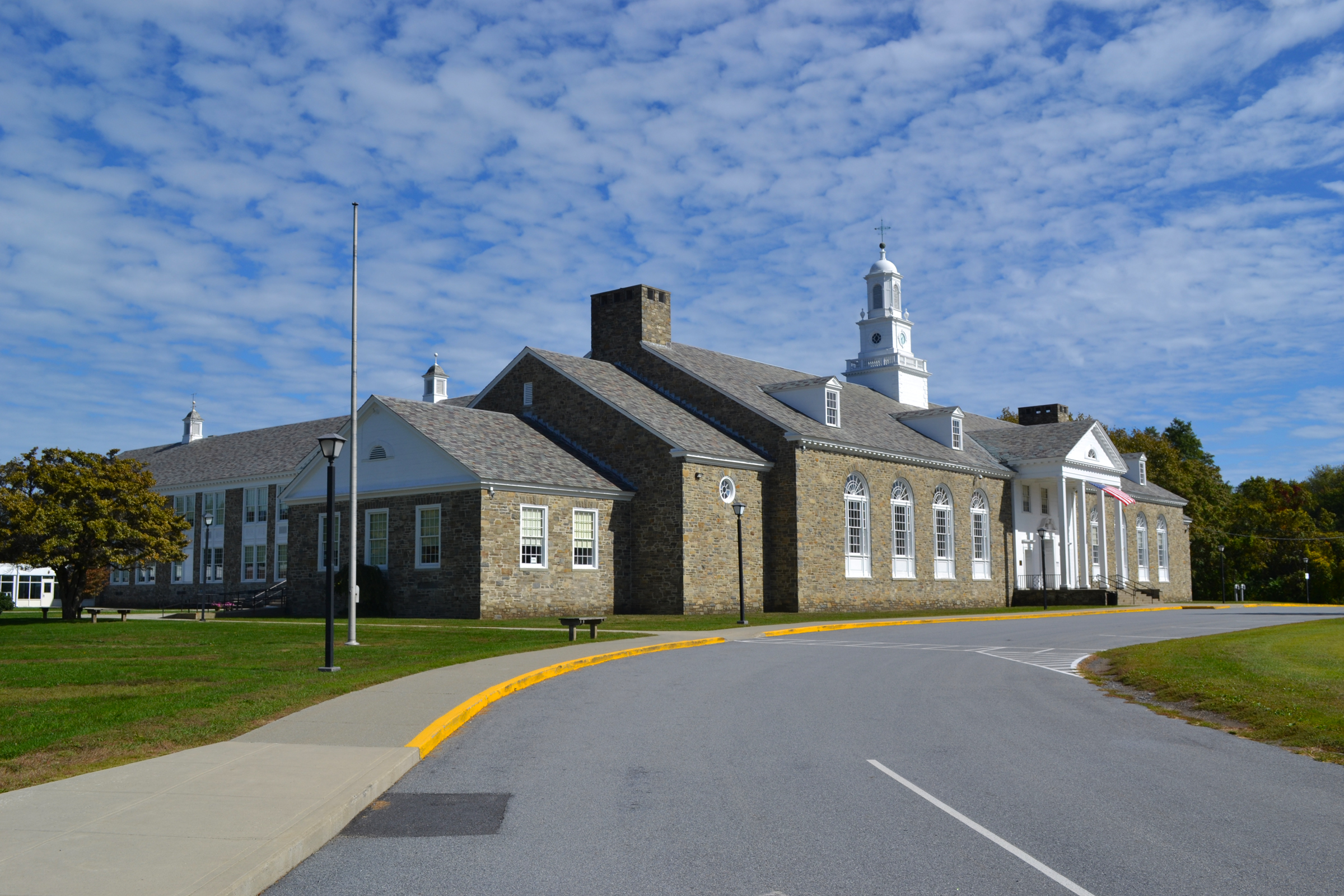
Western and Southern (front) elevations (of Haviland Middle School)

- Franklin Delano Roosevelt High School
- U.S. National Register of Historic Places
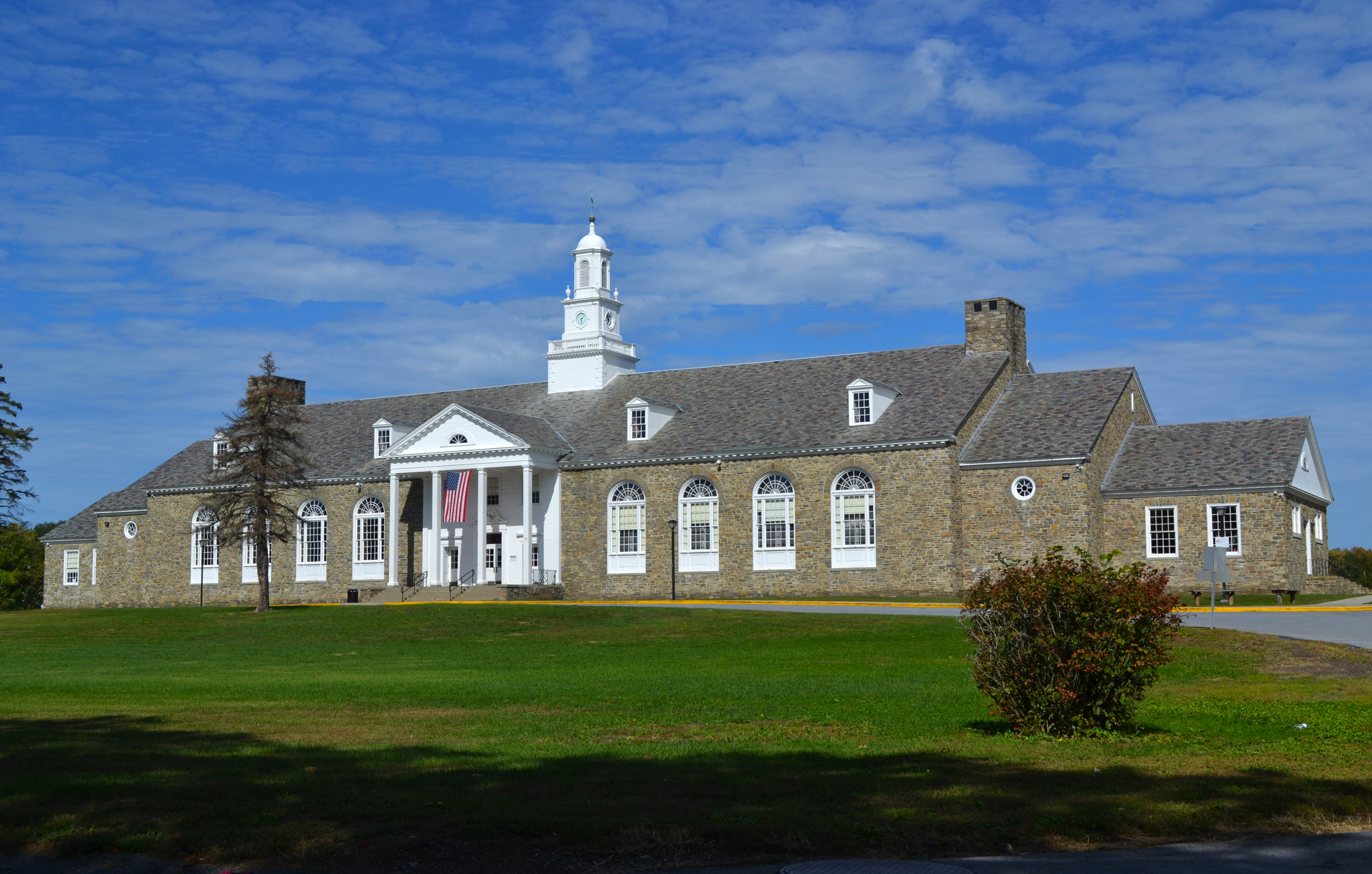
- Original high school building now used as the Haviland Middle School
- Location: 23 Haviland Road; Hyde Park, NY
- Coordinates: 41.826°N 73.902°W
- Architectural style: Colonial Revival
- NRHP reference No.: 10001125
- Added to NRHP: January 7, 2011

The original high school building (now Haviland Middle School) was built on land donated to the town by local farmer Ben Haviland. Construction began in 1938 and was one of three schools erected as a Depression-era Public Works Administration project in Hyde Park.

It was originally called the Franklin Delano Roosevelt Junior-Senior High School and may be the only public high school in the United States built under the auspices of, and named for, a sitting president. President Roosevelt dedicated the school to the town in 1940, and the school graduated its first class in 1941.

As enrollment increased, the town began construction on the current high school building which opened in 1965. An addition was added to the rear of the school in 1976. The outdoor athletic complex was upgraded in 2013 with a new multi-sport football field, grandstands, track and field facilities, and a concession stand.

The original building was listed on the National Register of Historic Places in 2011.

== Notable alumni ==
=== Artists ===
- Joe Quinones, comic book artist best known for his work on such titles as Spider-Man, Star Wars, and the Eisner award-winning, Wednesday Comics.

=== Authors ===
- Carolyn Adams Garcia — author, artist, former wife of Jerry Garcia
- Keith W. Olson — author of 20th-century history in U.S.
- Justin Taylan — World War II historian and author
- Bradford Pearson — journalist and author of "The Eagles of Heart Mountain" (2021)

=== Business ===
- Anthony Noto — current chief executive officer of SoFi (Social Finance, Inc)

=== Film and television ===
- Bill Duke — actor and film director
- Hafsteinn Hafsteinsson — Icelandic actor in film, television and advertising

=== Music ===
- Jeff Tyzik — conductor, arranger, and trumpeter with the Rochester Philharmonic Orchestra

=== Sports ===
- Wes Bialosuknia — former professional basketball player with 1967–1968 Oakland Oaks in ABA
- Craig Capano — former professional soccer player who played for Chicago Fire (2002–2006) of MLS, and USA U-20s
- Frank Cimorelli — former professional baseball pitcher for 1994 St. Louis Cardinals
- Will Daniels — professional basketball player with Nizhny Novgorod in Euroleague
- Ricky Horton — former Major League Baseball pitcher for St. Louis Cardinals and 1988 World Series champion Los Angeles Dodgers; broadcaster on Fox Sports Midwest
- C. J. Hunter — former Olympic shot putter and gold medalist at 1999 World Championship
- Patrick Manning — five-time member of U.S. National Rowing Team and silver medalist at 1992 Summer Olympics in Barcelona in men's heavyweight coxless four
- Jeff Pierce — former middle relief pitcher for the Boston Red Sox
- Richard Rinaldi — former professional basketball player with Baltimore Bullets and New York Nets in ABA
- Brett Wilkinson — former member of U.S. National Rowing Team who competed at 2004 Summer Olympics in men's quadruple sculls
- Kyle Winter — former professional rugby player and member of 2009 Indonesian National Rugby Team

== See also ==
- List of high schools in New York (state)#Dutchess County
- National Register of Historic Places listings in Dutchess County, New York
