= William Stoutenburgh House =

Historic house in New York, United States

- U.S. National Register of Historic Places
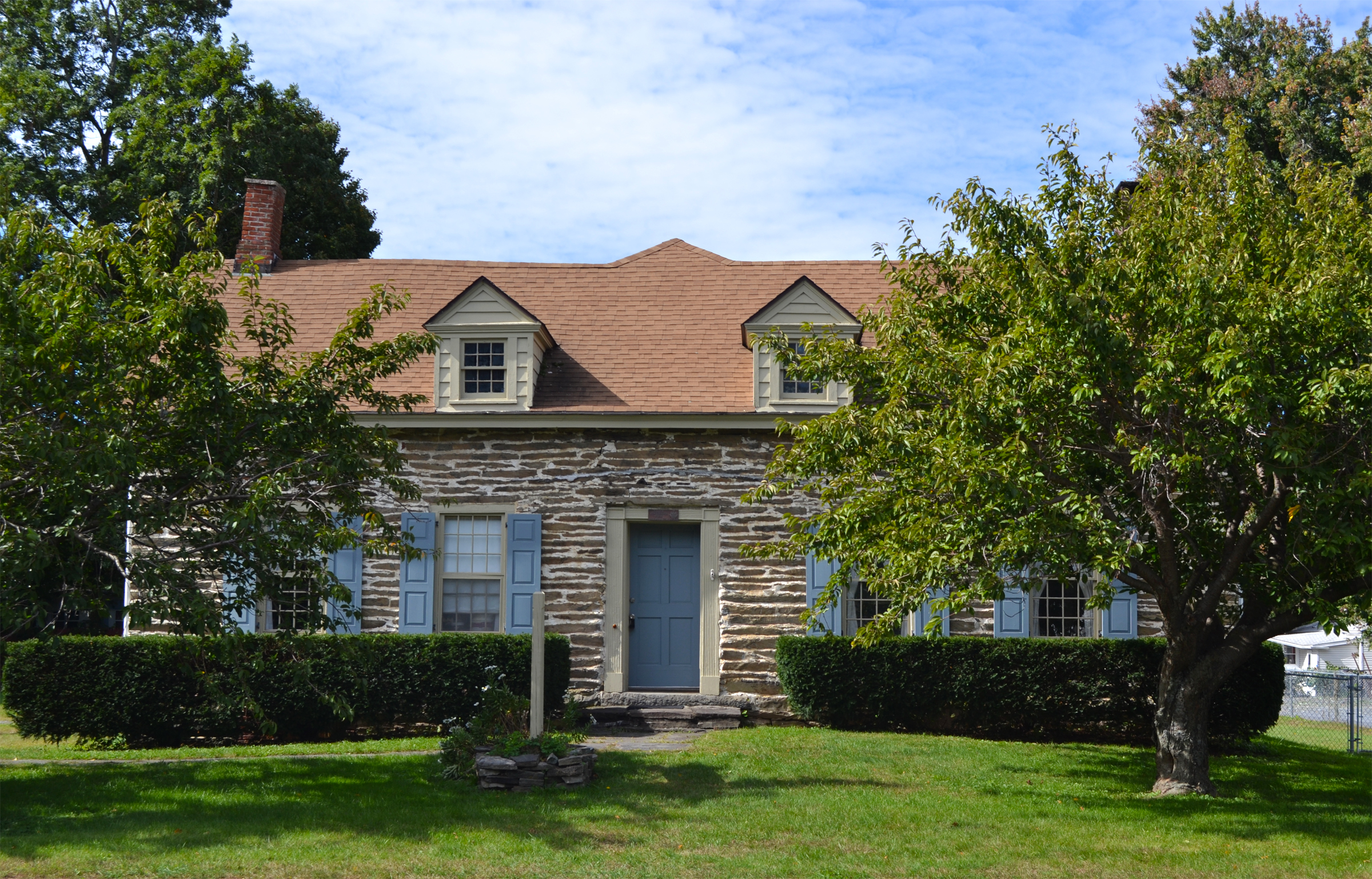
- The house in October 2015

- Location within New York Location within the United States
- Location: U.S. 9G, East Park, Hyde Park, New York
- Coordinates: 41°47′15″N 73°54′54″W
- Area: 0.5 acres (0.20 ha)
- Built: 1765
- NRHP reference No.: 72000830
- Added to NRHP: September 27, 1972

William Stoutenburgh House is a historic home located at Hyde Park in Dutchess County, New York. It was built about 1765 and is a one-story, rectangular dwelling five bays in length and two bays in width. It is constructed of fieldstone. The main entrance is sheltered by a one bay, flat roofed wood porch.

It was added to the National Register of Historic Places in 1972.
