= Wes Bialosuknia =

American basketball player

Personal information
- Born: June 8, 1945 Poughkeepsie, New York, U.S.
- Died: October 23, 2013 (aged 68) Hartford, Connecticut, U.S.
- Listed height: 6 ft 2 in (1.88 m)
- Listed weight: 185 lb (84 kg)

Career information
- High school: Franklin D. Roosevelt (Hyde Park, New York)
- College: UConn (1964–1967)
- NBA draft: 1967: 4th round, 36th overall pick
- Drafted by: St. Louis Hawks
- Playing career: 1967–1968
- Position: Shooting guard
- Number: 44

Career history
- 1967–1968: Oakland Oaks
- Stats at Basketball Reference

Wesley John Bialosuknia (June 8, 1945 – October 23, 2013) was an American basketball player. He was a 6-foot-2-inch (1.88 m) 185 pounds (84 kg) guard, and played in college for the University of Connecticut Huskies. An accurate and prolific medium- and long-range jump shooter, Bialosuknia still holds the University of Connecticut season and career scoring average records: his 1966–67 average of 28.0 PPG ranked 5th in the nation. He also holds the UConn records for career scoring average of 23.6 pts per game and consecutive foul shots made (43). In 1967, he was the MVP of the annual North–South College All-Star Game.

He was selected by the St. Louis Hawks in the 4th round (37th pick overall) of the 1967 NBA draft and by the Oakland Oaks in the 1967 ABA Draft.

He played for the Oakland Oaks (1967–68) for 70 games and was variously nicknamed "The Mad Bomber" or "The Typographical Terror"; Bialosuknia finished 2nd in the league in 3-point shooting percentage, and his 9 consecutive 3-pointers made is tied for the most in ABA history.

Bialosuknia died at the age of 68 on October 23, 2013.
