= Quaker Lane Farms =

Historic house in New York, United States

- U.S. National Register of Historic Places
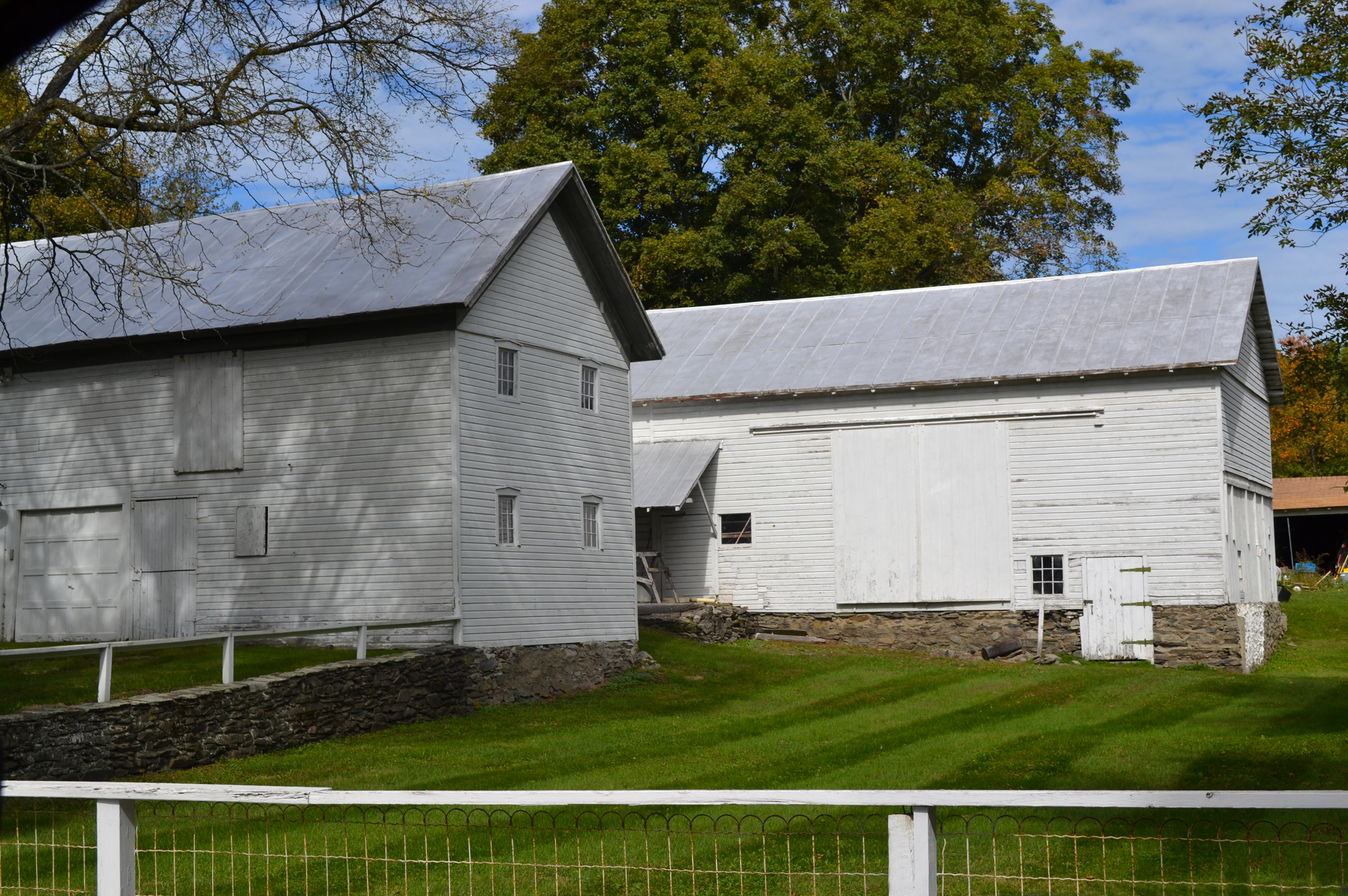
- Site barns in October 2015

- Location within New York Location within the United States
- Nearest city: Hyde Park, New York
- Coordinates: 41°48′36″N 73°51′45″W
- Area: 95 acres (38 ha)
- Built: c. 1804
- Architectural style: Federal
- NRHP reference No.: 03001303
- Added to NRHP: December 18, 2003

Quaker Lane Farms is a historic home and farm complex located at Hyde Park in Dutchess County, New York, United States. The complex consists of the farmhouse (c. 1804), barn (c. 1804), barn (c. 1835), an outhouse, and a corn crib. The house is a five-bay, 1 1/2-story clapboard structure with a center door and inside-end brick chimneys.

It was added to the National Register of Historic Places in 2003.

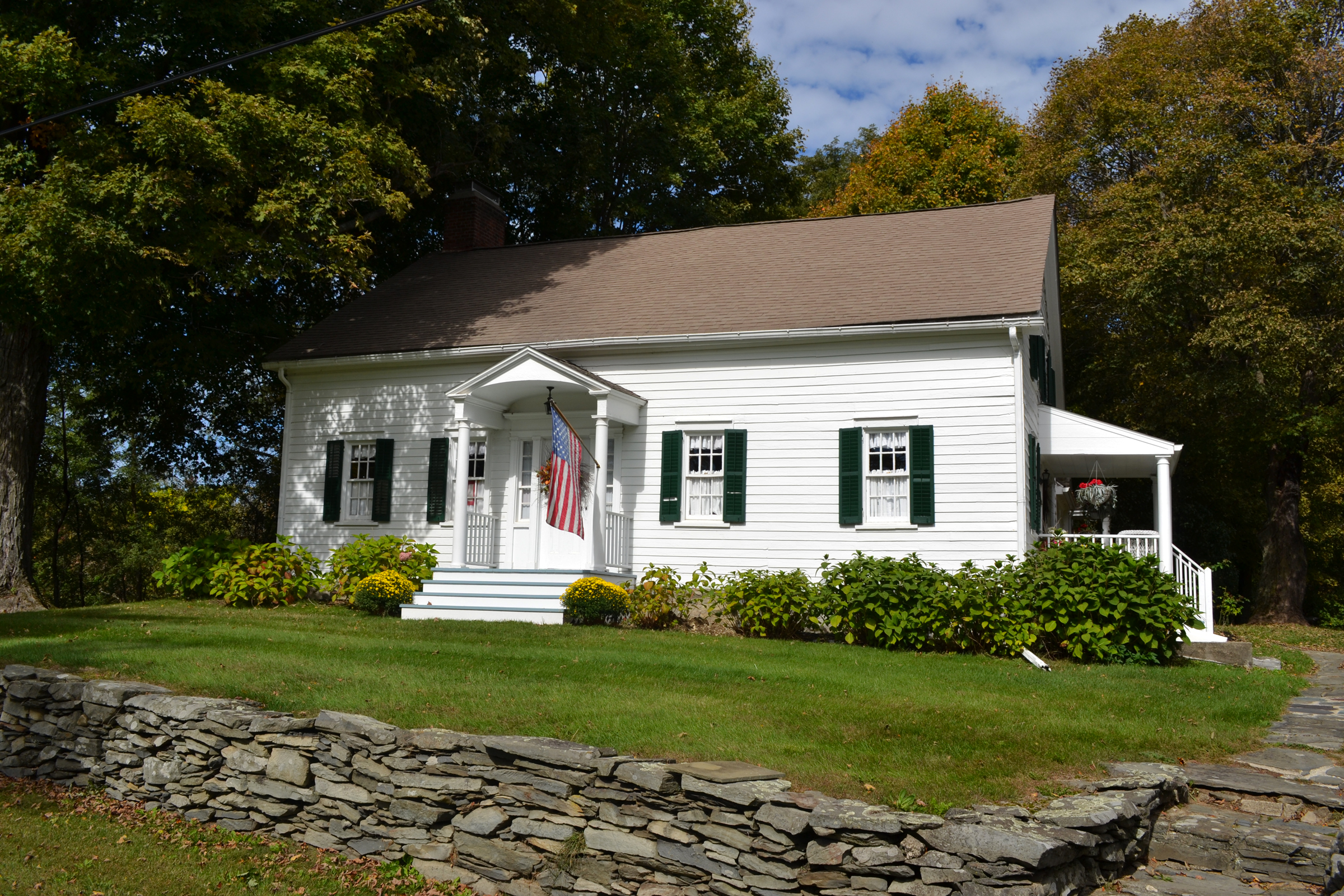
The farmhouse in October 2015
