= Hyde Park, New York =

Town in New York, United States

- Town
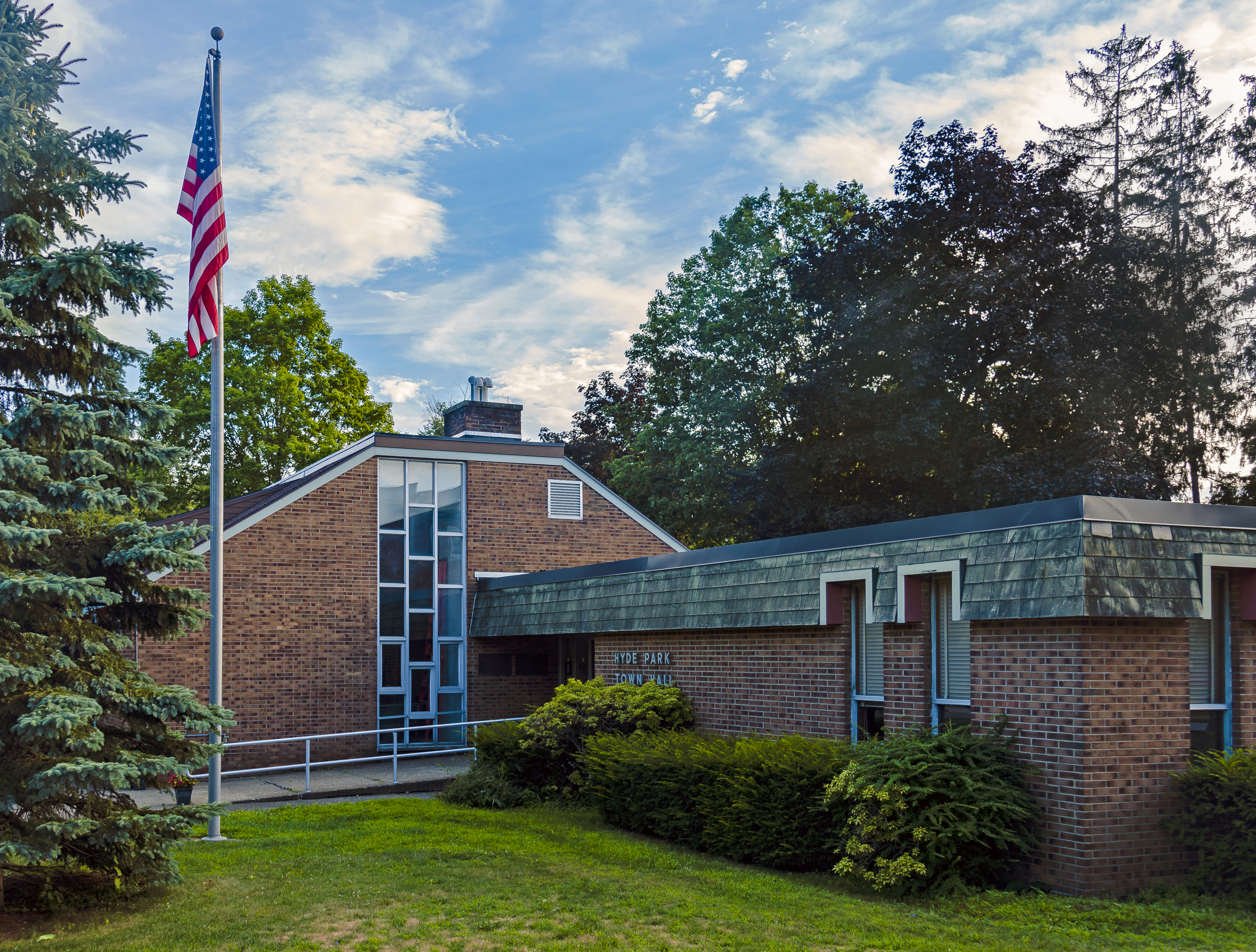
- Town hall of Hyde Park

- Seal

- Location within Dutchess County and the state of New York

- Location within New York Location within the United States
- Coordinates: 41°47′05″N 73°56′00″W
- Country: United States
- State: New York
- County: Dutchess
- Named for: Edward Hyde, 3rd Earl of Clarendon

Government
  - Type: Town council
  - Town supervisor: Alfred Torreggiani (R)
  - Town council: List of members: * W1: Marc Prine (D); * W2: Liz Mesquita (R); * W3: John Lombardi (R); * W4: Don Prusakowski (R)

Area
  - Total: 39.86 sq mi (103.23 km^{2})
  - Land: 36.66 sq mi (94.95 km^{2})
  - Water: 3.20 sq mi (8.28 km^{2})
- Elevation: 249 ft (76 m)

Population (2020)
  - Total: 21,021
- Time zone: UTC−05:00 (Eastern (EST))
  - Summer (DST): UTC−04:00 (EDT)
- ZIP Codes: 12538 (Hyde Park); 12580 (Staatsburg); 12601 (Poughkeepsie); 12572 (Rhinebeck)
- Area code: 845
- FIPS code: 36-027-37209
- GNIS feature ID: 0979090
- Website: www.hydeparkny.gov

Hyde Park is a town in Dutchess County, New York, United States, bordering the Hudson River north of Poughkeepsie. Within the town are the hamlets of Hyde Park, East Park, Staatsburg, and Haviland. Hyde Park is known as the hometown of Franklin D. Roosevelt, the 32nd president of the United States.

Hyde Park is home to the main campus of the Culinary Institute of America, a four-year college for culinary and baking and pastry arts, and the Franklin D. Roosevelt Presidential Library and Museum, the first presidential library in the United States.

Hyde Park's population was 21,021 at the 2020 United States census. U.S. Route 9 passes through the town near the Hudson River.

== History ==
=== Early history ===
Settlement of the region by Europeans officially began around 1742 but may have begun as early as 1710.

The name of the area was changed to "Hyde Park" around 1810. Previously, it was part of the Fauconnier Patent and was named "Stoutenburgh", after the town's first settler, Jacobus Stoughtenburg. Part of the town was from the Great Nine Partners Patent of 1697.

Doctor John Bard had called his estate "Hyde Park" in honor of Edward Hyde, who was Lord Cornbury and governor of New York from 1702 to 1708. In 1697, Hyde granted nine close friends of his a large swath of land "south of Albany" in the Great Nine Partners Patent, which would eventually make up much of Hyde Park. In 1804 a tavern-keeper named Miller, seeking new guests, renamed the tavern "the Hyde Park Inn", much to the annoyance of Doctor Bard. He then applied for a post office to be located at his inn, common among tavern keepers. The request was granted as the "Hyde Park Post Office". The settlement gradually came to be known not as Stoutenburgh but as Hyde Park, which it officially became in 1812.

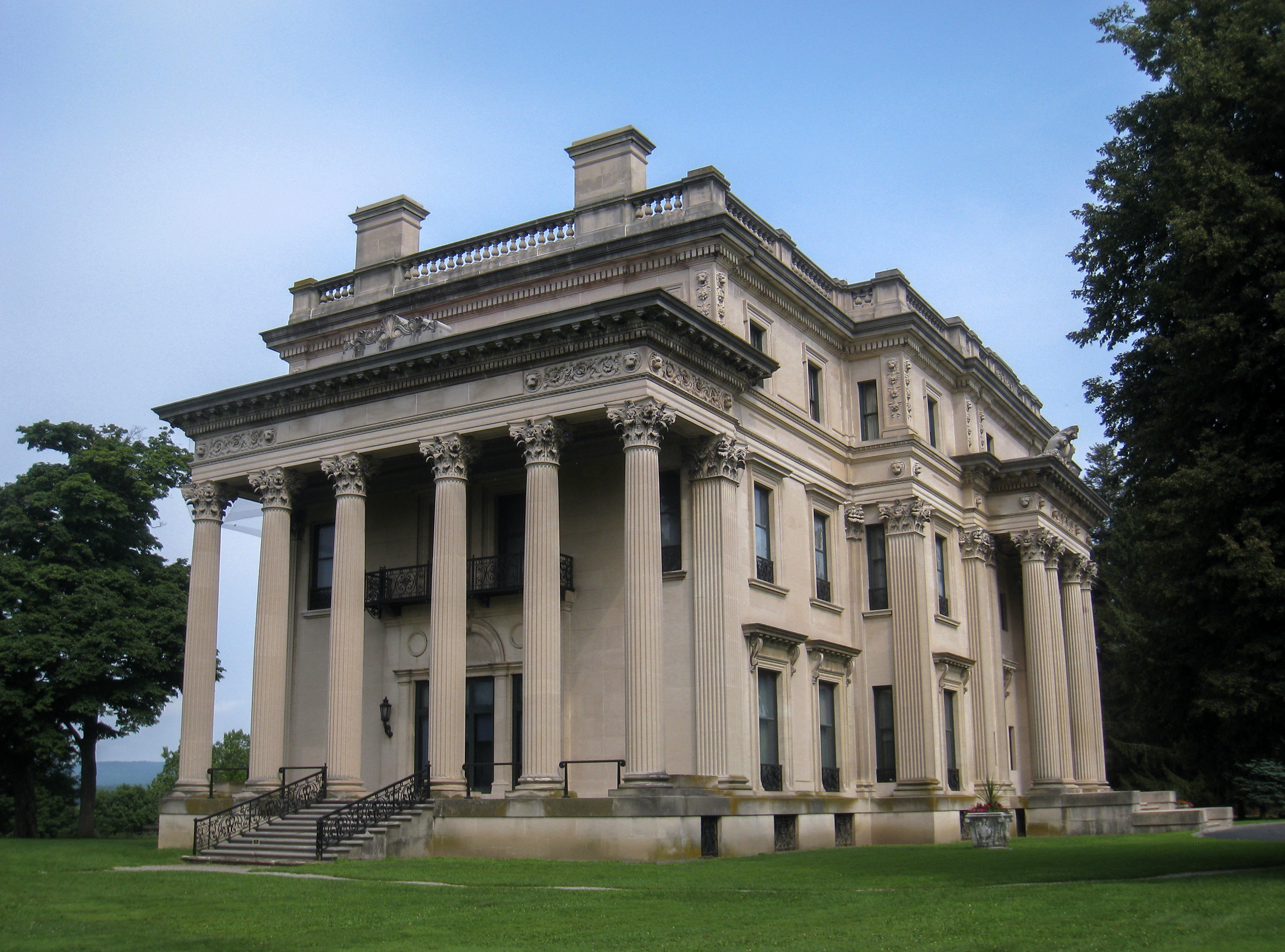
The Vanderbilt Mansion National Historic Site

Hyde Park was a part of Clinton, New York, until 1821 when it was incorporated as a separate town. The Hyde Park Railroad Station, located at the mouth of Crum Elbow Creek along the Hudson River, was used by the town's residents, including the Roosevelts.

The town includes Frederick William Vanderbilt's spring and autumn mansion, now maintained as the Vanderbilt Mansion National Historic Site.

=== The Roosevelt family ===
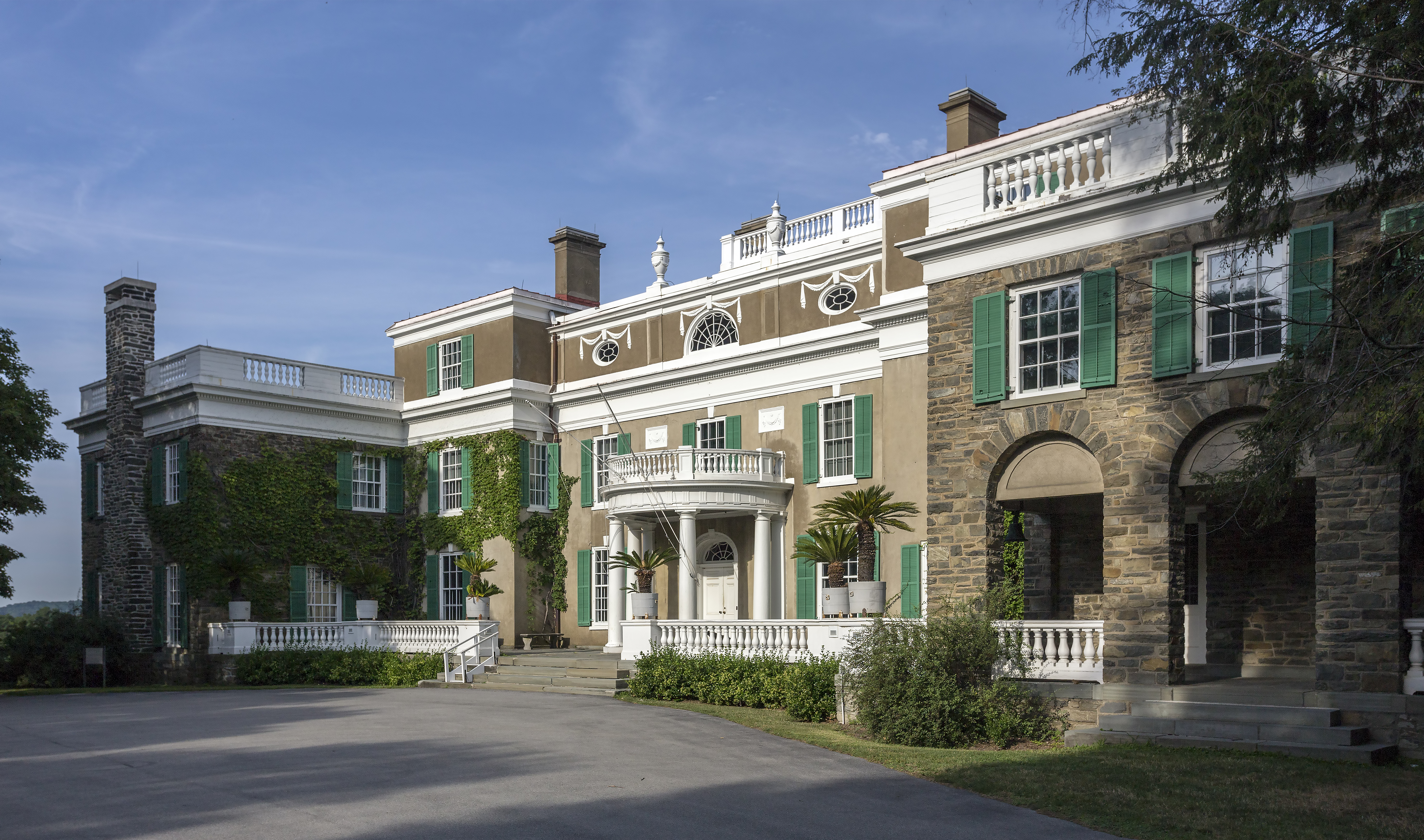
Springwood, Franklin D. Roosevelt's home

Hyde Park is the hometown of Franklin D. Roosevelt (1882–1945), who served as president of the United States from 1933 until his death in 1945. His estate, Springwood, is the site of the Home of Franklin D. Roosevelt National Historic Site maintained by the National Park Service. Also on the site are his presidential library and museum. Roosevelt used this residence throughout his life. FDR's historical house is now a museum that can be visited.

His house is listed on the U.S. National Register of Historic Places, as are the homes of Eleanor Roosevelt, Isaac Roosevelt, and Frederick William Vanderbilt, along with Haviland Middle School (formerly Franklin D. Roosevelt High School).

Val-Kill was the home of Eleanor Roosevelt, wife of Franklin D. Roosevelt. It is located about 2 miles (3 km) east of the home of FDR.

Franklin D. Roosevelt and Eleanor Roosevelt are both buried in the rose garden at "Springwood".

President Roosevelt's father, James Roosevelt, Sr., served a term as supervisor of the town of Hyde Park.

== Geography ==
According to the United States Census Bureau, the town of Hyde Park has a total area of 39.8 square miles (103.2 km^{2}), of which 36.7 square miles (95.0 km^{2}) is land and 3.2 square miles (8.3 km^{2}), or 8.02%, is water.

The Hudson River defines the western town line, which is the border with Ulster County. Hyde Park is bordered by the town of Poughkeepsie to the south, Rhinebeck to the north, and Clinton and Pleasant Valley to the east.

== Demographics ==
As of the 2010 census, the town's population was 21,571. The racial makeup was 87.1% white, 6.0% African American, 0.2% Native American, 2.5% Asian, 0.0% Pacific Islander, 1.8% other races, 2.4% two or more races. Hispanic or Latino people of any race were 5.6% of the population.

As of the U.S. Census of 2000, there were 20,851 people, 7,395 households, and 5,220 families residing in the town. The population density was 564.2 inhabitants per square mile (217.8/km^{2}). There were 7,704 housing units at an average density of 208.5 per square mile (80.5/km^{2}). The racial makeup of the town was 91.02% White, 4.25% African American, 0.20% Native American, 1.39% Asian, 0.08% Pacific Islander, 1.19% from other races, and 1.86% from two or more races. Hispanic or Latino of any race were 3.23% of the population.

There were 7,395 households, out of which 34.0% had children under the age of 18 living with them, 56.7% were married couples living together, 10.3% had a female householder with no husband present, and 29.4% were non-families. 23.0% of all households were made up of individuals, and 8.6% had someone living alone who was 65 years of age or older. The average household size was 2.63 and the average family size was 3.10.

In the town, the age distribution of the population shows 24.7% under the age of 18, 11.2% from 18 to 24, 28.5% from 25 to 44, 23.1% from 45 to 64, and 12.5% who were 65 years of age or older. The median age was 36 years. For every 100 females, there were 99.8 males. For every 100 females age 18 and over, there were 99.0 males.

The median income for a household in the town was $50,870, and the median income for a family was $58,047. Males had a median income of $42,251 versus $28,176 for females. The per capita income for the town was $21,260. About 4.4% of families and 5.7% of the population were below the poverty line, including 5.3% of those under age 18 and 6.0% of those age 65 or over.

Historical population
Census	Pop.	Note	%±
1830	2,554		—
1840	2,364		−7.4%
1850	2,425		2.6%
1860	2,749		13.4%
1870	2,695		−2.0%
1880	2,873		6.6%
1890	2,821		−1.8%
1900	2,806		−0.5%
1910	3,019		7.6%
1920	2,880		−4.6%
1930	3,388		17.6%
1940	4,056		19.7%
1950	6,136		51.3%
1960	12,681		106.7%
1970	16,910		33.3%
1980	20,768		22.8%
1990	21,230		2.2%
2000	20,851		−1.8%
2010	21,571		3.5%
2020	21,021		−2.5%
2024 (est.)	21,338	▲	1.5%
U.S. Decennial Census

== Communities and locations in Hyde Park ==
=== Communities ===
- East Park—a hamlet east of Hyde Park village.
- Fairview – a hamlet primarily located in Poughkeepsie.
- Haviland—a community in the southern part of the town.
- Hyde Park—the hamlet of Hyde Park is on Route 9, near the Hudson River.
- Staatsburg—a hamlet by the Hudson River in the northwestern part of the town.

=== Places of interest ===
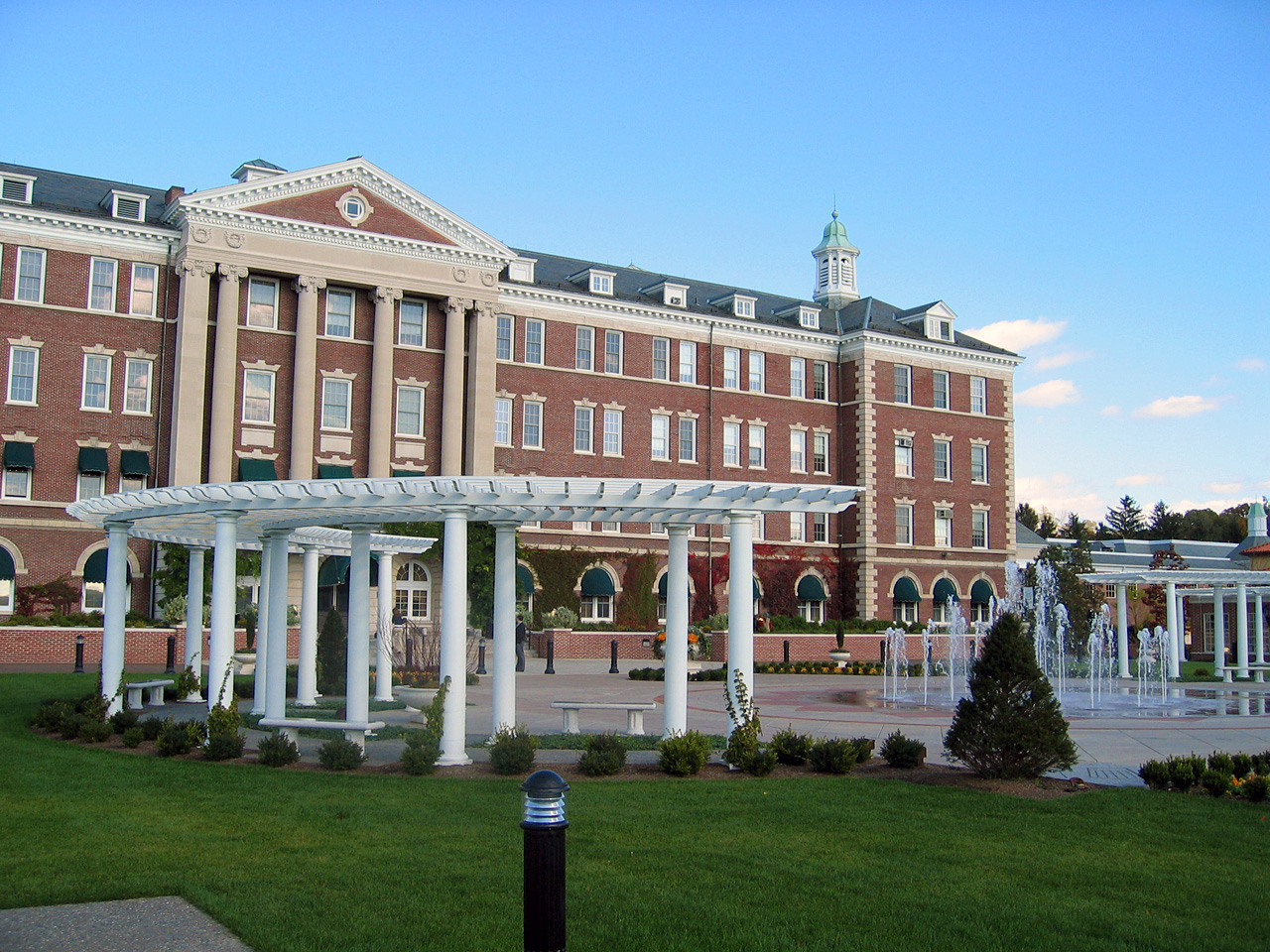
Hyde Park campus of the Culinary Institute of America

==== National parks ====
- Eleanor Roosevelt National Historic Site
- Franklin D. Roosevelt Presidential Library and Museum
- Home of Franklin D. Roosevelt National Historic Site
- Top Cottage
- Vanderbilt Mansion National Historic Site

==== State parks ====
- Ogden Mills & Ruth Livingston Mills State Park
- Margaret Lewis Norrie State Park

==== National Register of Historic Places ====
- Crum Elbow Meeting House and Cemetery
- Bergh–Stoutenburgh House
- Franklin Delano Roosevelt Junior-Senior High School (now Haviland Middle School)
- Hyde Park Elementary School
- Hyde Park Firehouse (now Hyde Park Historical Society Museum)
- Hyde Park Post Office
- Hyde Park Railroad Station
- John Hendricks House and Dutch Barn
- Main Street-Albertson Street-Park Place Historic District
- Quaker Lane Farms
- Hyde Park Reformed Dutch Church
- Roosevelt Point Cottage and Boathouse
- St. James Chapel
- Vanderbilt Lane Historic District
- Wales House
- William Stoutenburgh House

== Education ==
The majority of the town (including the Hyde Park hamlet) is in the Hyde Park Central School District. A small portion of the town to the southeast is in the Arlington Central School District, and a small portion to the north is in the Rhinebeck Central School District

The Hyde Park school district's comprehensive high school is Franklin Delano Roosevelt High School.

== Notable people ==
=== Actors ===
- Joseph Mazzello, actor known for his roles in Jurassic Park, The Pacific, The Social Network and Bohemian Rhapsody.

=== Artists ===
- Angela Fraleigh, contemporary artist known for her oil and mixed media paintings.
- Aaron Kuffner, New York City-based conceptual artist
- Alice Provensen, artist and children's books illustrator
- Martin Provensen, children's books illustrator and designer of the Kellogg's mascot, Tony the Tiger

=== Business people ===
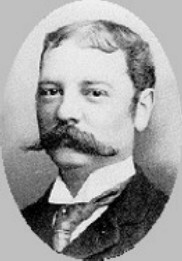
Frederick W. Vanderbilt

- André Balazs, hotelier and restaurateur
- Perry Collins, founder of Russian American Telegraph
- Beatrice Forbes, Countess of Granard, daughter of Ogden Mills and wife to Bernard Forbes, 8th Earl of Granard
- Bob Guccione, publisher, film producer
- Kathy Keeton, magazine publisher and author
- Ogden Mills, financier, philanthropist, racehorse owner/breeder
- Gladys Mills Phipps, socialite and thoroughbred racehorse owner and breeder who began the Phipps family dynasty in American horse racing
- Isaac Roosevelt, businessman and paternal grandfather of Franklin D. Roosevelt
- James Roosevelt I, businessman and father of Franklin D. Roosevelt
- John Aspinwall Roosevelt, businessman, US Navy Officer, Bronze Star recipient, and son of Franklin D. Roosevelt
- Frederick William Vanderbilt, businessman, philanthropist, and railroad magnate

=== Journalism ===
- Lorena Hickok, journalist

=== Music ===
- Rudolf Firkušný, Czech-born classical pianist
- Ed Summerlin, American composer, jazz saxophonist, and music educator
- James Syler, American composer fluent in various musical genres including wind ensemble, choral, orchestral, and chamber music.
- Jeff Tyzik, conductor, arranger, and trumpeter with the Rochester Philharmonic Orchestra

=== Political figures ===
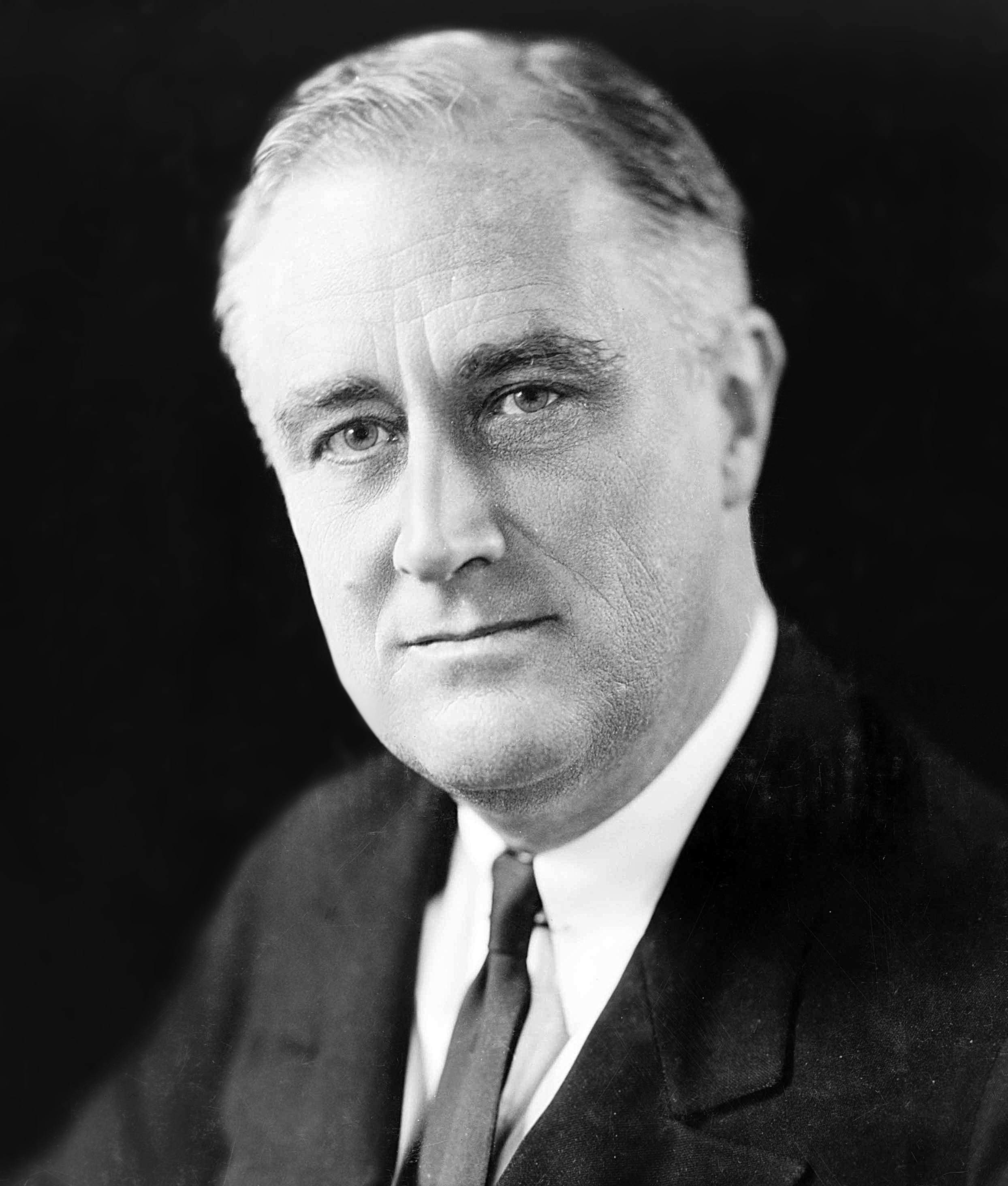
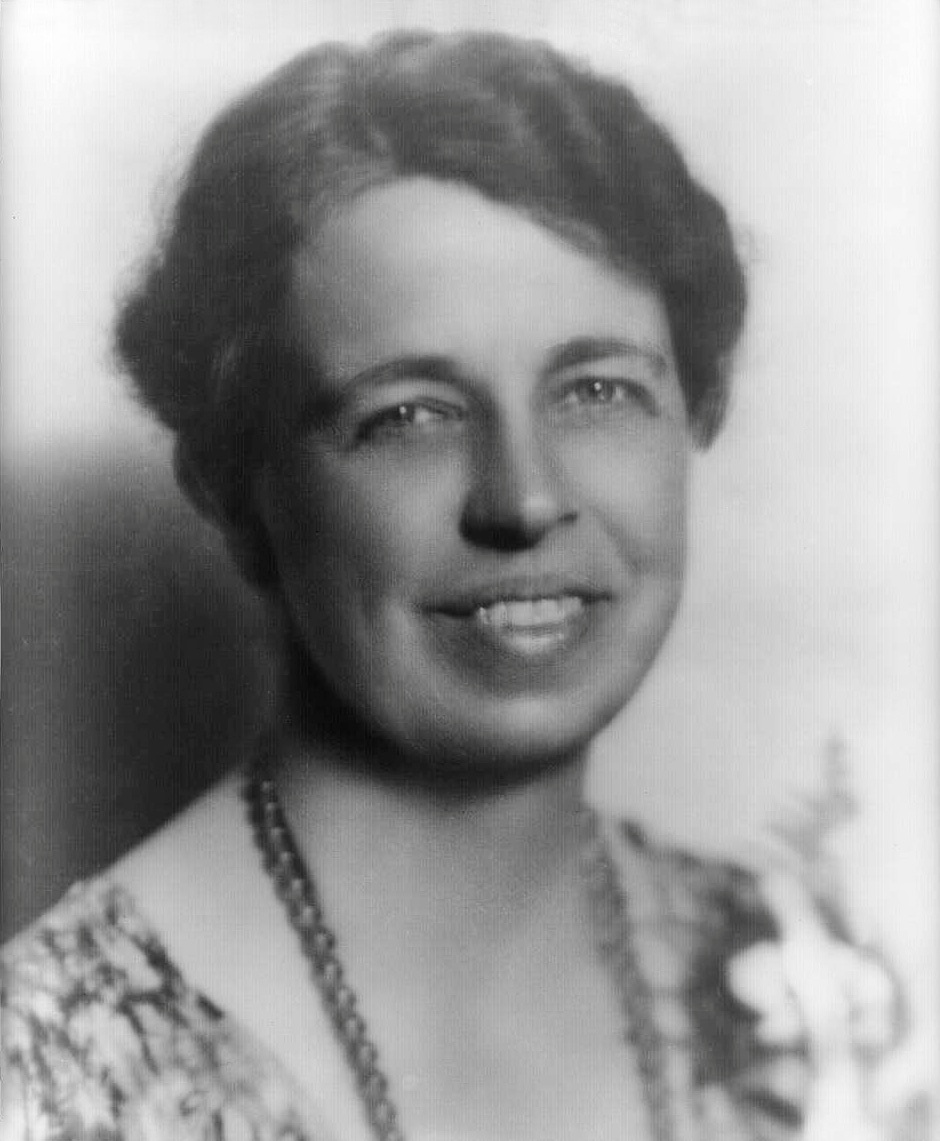
Franklin and Eleanor Roosevelt
- Marion Dickerman, suffragist, educator, vice-principal of the Todhunter School
- Ernest I. Hatfield, member of the New York State Senate from 1948 to 1964
- Morgan Lewis, American military commander during the Revolutionary War and 4th governor of New York
- Henry Brockholst Livingston, early 19th-century Associate Justice of the Supreme Court of the United States
- Maturin Livingston, early 19th-century political figure and recorder of New York City from 1804 to 1806
- Gloanna W. MacCarthy (1879–1968), politician who served in the New Jersey General Assembly
- Ogden L. Mills, lawyer, businessman and politician, and former United States Secretary of the Treasury
- William Nelson, member of the United States House of Representatives from 1847 to 1851
- James Kirke Paulding, American writer and former United States Secretary of the Navy from 1838 to 1841
- Edmund H. Pendleton, member of the United States House of Representatives from 1831 to 1833
- Nathaniel Pendleton, 18th-century lawyer and judge
- Greg Quinn, farmer and activist partly responsible for the overturning of the New York state ban on the commercial cultivation of black currants
- Eleanor Roosevelt, politician, diplomat, activist, and longest-acting First Lady of the United States
- Elliott Roosevelt, former mayor of Miami Beach, Florida, U.S. Army Brigadier General during World War II, author, and son of President F.D. Roosevelt
- Franklin D. Roosevelt, 32nd president of the United States from 1933 to 1945
- Hall Roosevelt, youngest brother of Eleanor Roosevelt, former comptroller for the city of Detroit
- Sara Roosevelt, mother of Franklin D. Roosevelt
- Sue Serino, member of the New York State Senate from 2015 to 2022
- John H. Selkreg, 19th-century American newspaper editor and member of the New York State Senate from 1874 to 1877
- J. Griswold Webb, member of the New York State Senate from 1923 to 1934
- William W. Woodworth, town supervisor, and member of the United States House of Representatives from 1845 to 1847

=== Religious figures ===
- John Bard, Christian philanthropist; founder of Bard College
- Fr. James J. LeBar, Roman Catholic priest; chief exorcist of the Archdiocese of New York in the United States
- Bp. Donald Edmond Pelotte, third Roman Catholic bishop of the Diocese of Gallup, New Mexico†

=== Science and medicine ===
- Samuel Bard, personal physician to George Washington and founder of the first medical school located in New York State
- Maunsell Crosby, well regarded ornithologist, writer, and farmer
- David Hosack, noted physician, botanist, and educator. Known for tending to Alexander Hamilton’s injuries after his final duel with Aaron Burr

=== Sports ===
George Browne of the New York Giants

- Wes Bialosuknia, professional basketball player in the American Basketball Association
- Frank Cimorelli, professional baseball player with the St. Louis Cardinals in 1994
- George Browne, professional baseball player from 1901 to 1912; member of the 1905 World Series Champion New York Giants
- Craig Capano, professional soccer player who represented the United States at a youth level and the Chicago Fire from 2002-2006
- Rube DeGroff, professional baseball player with the St. Louis Cardinals from 1905 to 1906
- Ricky Horton, professional baseball player with the St. Louis Cardinals (1984–1987). Pitcher. Played in the 1985, 1987, 1988 (with the Dodgers) world series.
- Ron Lipton, amateur fighter and professional NYS Boxing Hall of Fame referee
- Ellen Roosevelt, three-time U.S. National Championship tennis player between 1890 and 1893 and member of the International Tennis Hall of Fame
- Grace Roosevelt, two-time U.S. National Championship tennis player in doubles in 1891 and mixed doubles in 1889
- Amar'e Stoudemire, NBA basketball player who played for the Phoenix Suns, New York Knicks, Dallas Mavericks, and the Miami Heat.
- Brett Wilkinson, member of the U.S. National Rowing Team who competed at the 2004 Summer Olympics
- Kyle Winter, professional rugby player and member of the Indonesian National Rugby Team

=== Writers ===
- Hilary Masters, 20th-century novelist
- Joan Slonczewski, microbiologist and science fiction writer
- Justin Taylan, author, World War II historian, and founder of Pacific Wrecks

== In popular culture ==
- The whole 2012 movie Hyde Park on Hudson starring Bill Murray was based on the U.K. King visiting Roosevelt residence.
- Portions of the 1994 movie Wolf starring Jack Nicholson were filmed at Hyde Park's Vanderbilt Mansion National Historic Site.
- Hyde Park was the setting for portions of James Mangold's 1995 film Heavy, including the Culinary Institute of America.
- The Hulk travels to Hyde Park in Marvel Comics 1997 issue of Avengers (vol. 2 #4).
- In 2007, Hyde Park's Eveready Diner was featured on Season 1 (Ep. 6) of Guy Fieri's television series Diners, Drive-Ins and Dives on the Food Network.
- The Hyde Park Drive-In was used in the filming of the 2018 film, Love Is Blind starring Matthew Broderick and Chloë Sevigny.
- The 2019 film, Driveways starring Brian Dennehy, filmed in select locations in Hyde Park including Hyde Park Roller Magic and Nana's Ice Cream & Grill.

== See also ==
- Hyde Park Central Schools
- Maritje Kill
