= Maritje Kill =

Maritje Kill Marytie's Kill, Maricha Kill
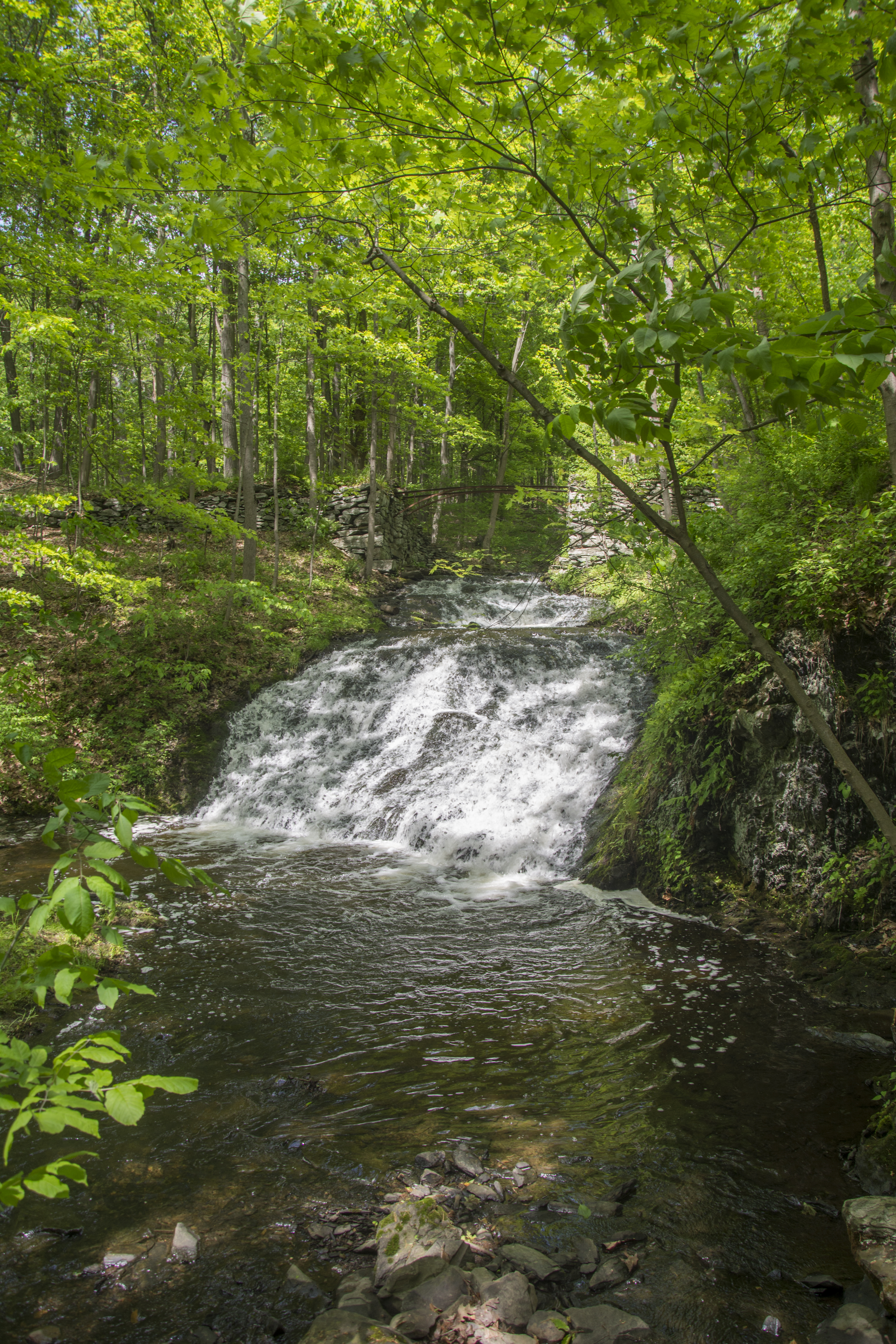

Location
- Country: United States
- State: New York
- Region: Hudson Valley
- County: Dutchess
- Municipality: Hyde Park

Physical characteristics
- Source
  - coordinates: 41.8105556°N 73.8913889°W
- Mouth: Hudson River
  - location: Hyde Park campus of the CIA
  - coordinates: 41.7537045°N 73.9368039°W
  - elevation: 0 ft (0 m)

The Maritje Kill is a tributary of the Hudson River in Hyde Park, New York. Its source is three miles northeast of the village of Hyde Park, and it enters the Hudson at the Hyde Park campus of the Culinary Institute of America (CIA). The river's name uses an old Dutch version of the given name Marietje, meaning "little Mary". It is one of two major waterways in Hyde Park, and flows north to south through the town.

The river was used by natives since around 1700 BCE, and farms and mills existed around the river from the 18th to mid-20th centuries. The Culinary Institute of America purchased part of the surrounding area in 1970.

== Course ==
The source of the Maritje Kill is roughly two miles east of the Hudson River, just east of New York State Route 9G. The river runs generally southeast, through land and two trails of the FDR Home's Roosevelt Farm & Forest, until it reaches the Hudson River at a cove at an undeveloped plot of the Hyde Park campus of the Culinary Institute of America, crossing under Amtrak's Empire Corridor railway in the process.

== Name ==
The river uses an old Dutch version of the name Marietje, meaning "little Mary". It is a kill, a word taken from the Dutch word for "creek". The river had kept that name since the area's early history, around the United States' Colonial Era. Other names in use include Marytie's Kill and Maricha Kill. In 1936, Franklin D. Roosevelt wrote in a letter to Helen W. Reynolds that "Maritje Kill runs, as you know, right through our place. We have always called it by that name, but I do not know who the little Mary was." Reynolds was a friend and longtime collaborator with FDR, on local history; they were both founding members of the Dutchess County Historical Society.

== History ==
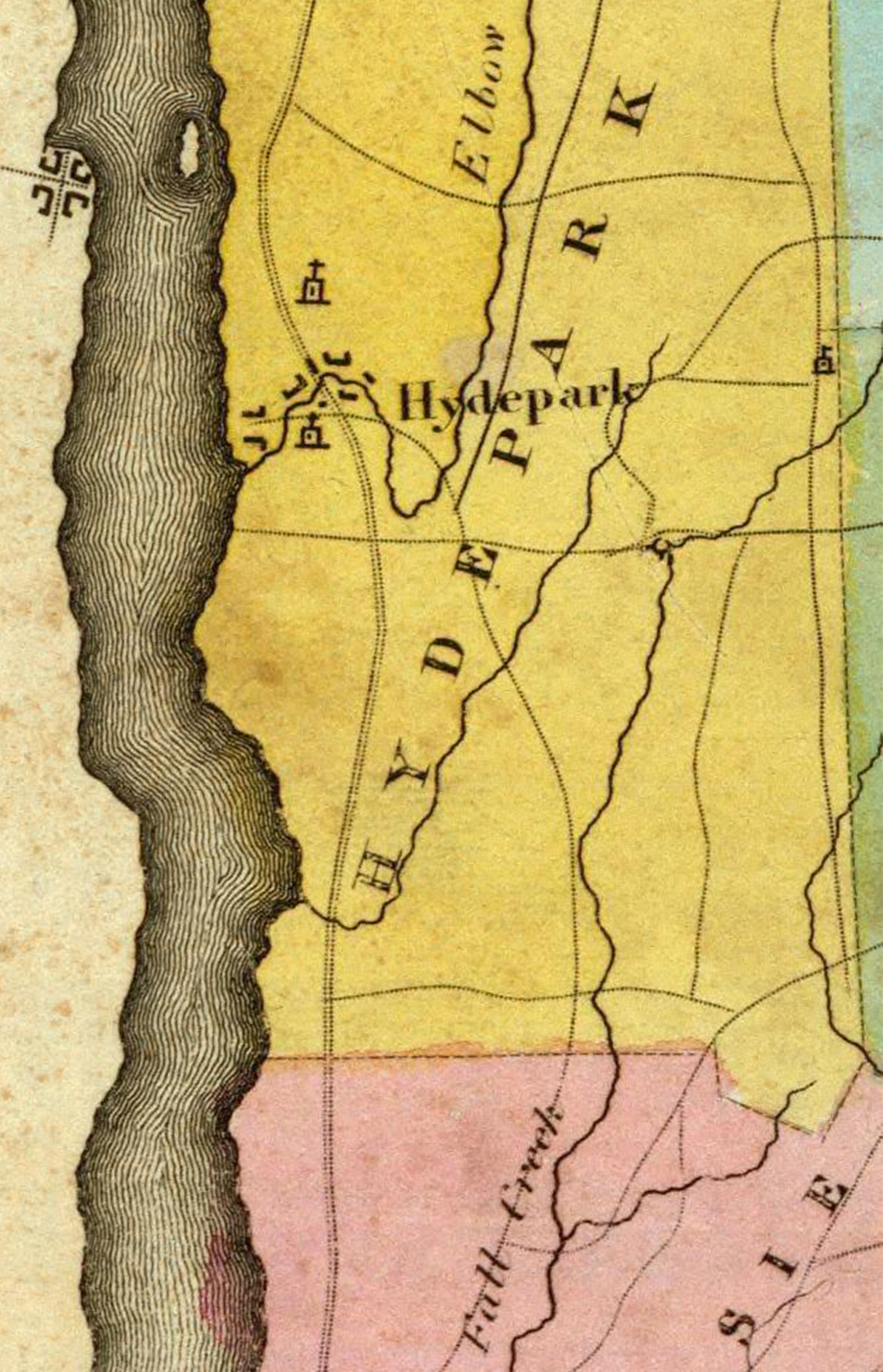
The Maritje Kill, between Crum Elbow Creek and Fall Kill, 1829

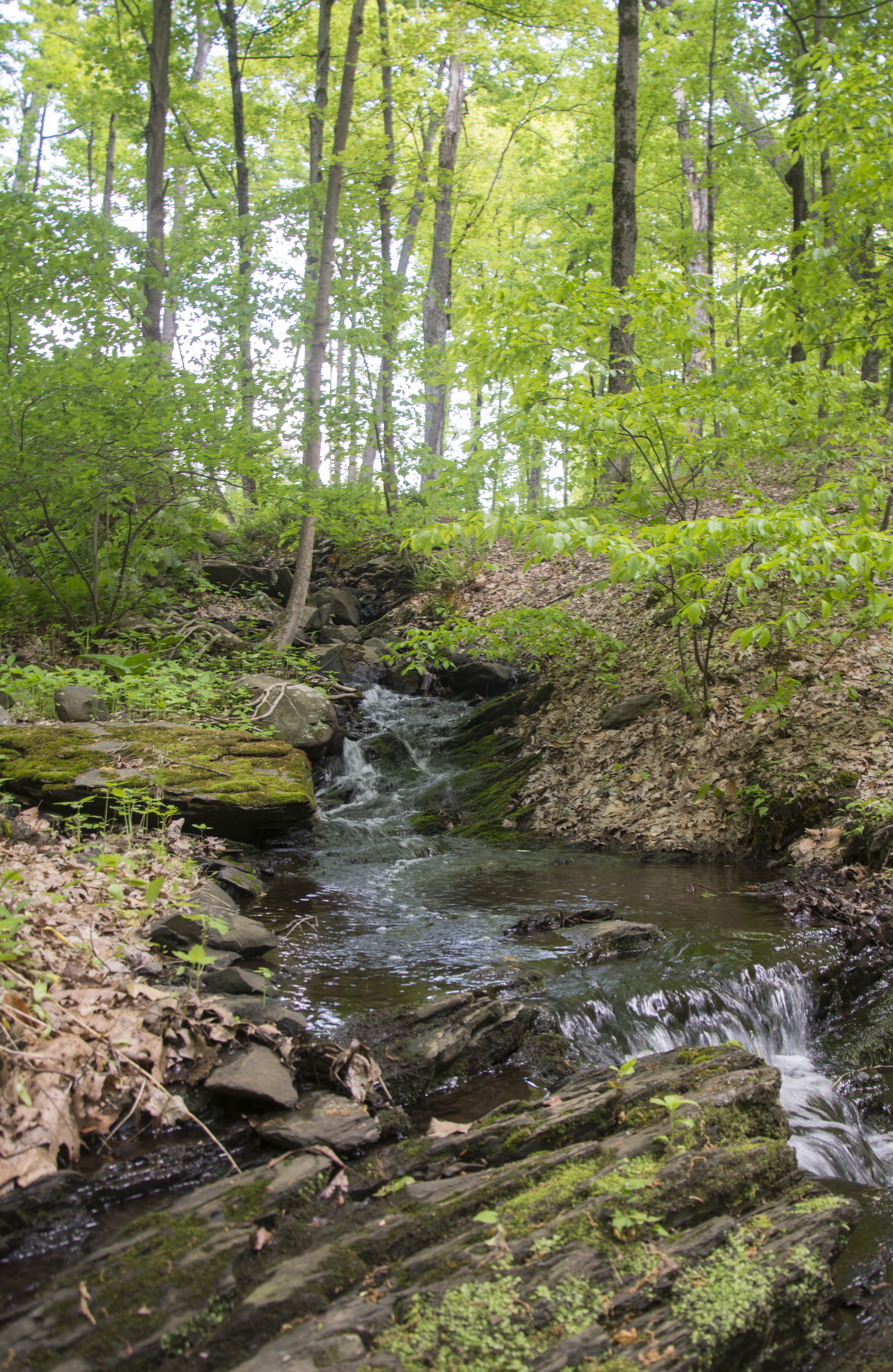
A tributary of the Maritje Kill

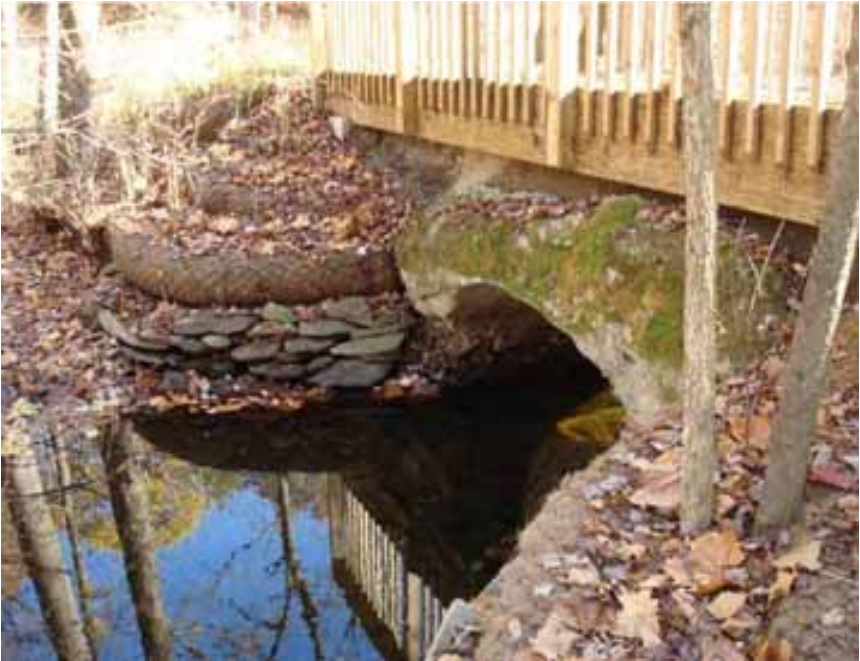
The Maritje Kill Bridge

The Culinary Institute of America owns forested land around the river toward the north end of its developed campus. The site's earliest inhabitance likely started near the Maritje Kill, possibly due to the river's abundance in fish, edible plants, and clean water. A one-year archaeological survey found evidence of human activity in the wooded property dating at least 3,600 years, with elements dating from around 1700 BCE and up until the mid-20th century. Prehistoric objects included stone tools, byproducts of tool production, projectile points, and fire hearths found in the site's portion used for crop cultivation.

The earliest colonial settlements in the area date to the 1600s, however the earliest recorded land transfer was in 1719. A saw mill was located on the property since at least 1786, owned by a Revolutionary War militia officer and his family. The family burial ground is a short distance across the kill. According to a 1789 map, a grist mill was located on the northern bank of the kill a short distance west of US Route 9. An 1893 county atlas shows large ponds or lakes behind the dam, indicating that the stream level had once been considerably higher. The property changed ownership multiple times in the 1800s. James Roosevelt owned the land as part of his estate in the 1820s, and by the 1860s a farmhouse and stone terraces were constructed along the stream by Moses Beach. In the 1890s the Webendorfer family of Long Island built additional farm buildings. Artifacts and ruins from the Colonial Era dwellings exist, including a site with two house structures, a dam, a mill, retaining walls, and outbuildings and barns. The site was found to be eligible as a historic district on the National Register of Historic Places. Excavations unearthed foundation walls, a well, cistern, and post molds, and artifacts from the mid-to-late 1700s, including ceramics, tobacco pipes, coins, buttons, buckles, military objects, thimbles, domesticated animal remains, and an inscribed piece of slate. There are no documents of mills existing on the river east of Route 9, though a large stone dam lies a short way east of the highway, which has a long wooden trough built into it.

In February 1976, a collision of two freight trains caused a wreck at the mouth of the river. One of the cars fell into the Maritje Kill's cove, and reportedly the cars spilled hydrochloric acid.

A large development, Bellefield at Historic Hyde Park, is planned to be constructed in the forestland across the highway from the CIA. The development will include shops, hotels, spas, 559 units of housing, and a 45-acre farm. It will also include the Parkside Residences at Maritje Place, a group of houses, apartment-style townhouses, and other residential buildings along the Maritje Kill. The developer T-Rex Capital has owned it for several years, after acquiring it from the developer Baker-Gagne, which planned a similar project and abandoned it during the 2008 financial crisis.

== Trails ==
The kill crosses through land and two trails of the FDR Home's Roosevelt Farm & Forest. The National Park Service has also desired a connection through to south of the CIA campus, which would require a crossing of the kill. The school plans to eventually make a road crossing the kill, however a concern is over the unstable riverbanks there and a historic site just south of the river.

== Environmental protection ==
The Maritje Kill Critical Environmental Area surrounds part of the kill in Hyde Park. It includes wetlands and areas designated as containing rare animals and plants.

== See also ==
- List of rivers of New York
