= James Syler =

American composer (born 1961)

- Birth name: James Scott Syler
- Born: April 7, 1961 (age 63); Hyde Park, New York
- Genres: Wind ensemble, orchestra, choral, chamber
- Occupation: Composer
- Years active: 1988–present
- Website: www.jamessyler.com

James Scott Syler (born April 7, 1961, from Hyde Park, New York) is an American composer fluent in many genres of music including Wind Ensemble, Choral, Orchestral, and Chamber Music.

A student of Alfred Reed, Karl Korte, and Michael Colgrass, Syler's music is known for its lyricism and drama. His compositional style his highly eclectic, melding techniques ranging from the Baroque and Renaissance to Minimalism. He was the winner of the 1993 National Band Association Composition Award, the 1993 Arnald Gabriel Composition Award, the 2002 American Composers Forum Commission, and received two grants from the American Music Center. He established his own publishing company, Ballerbach Music in 1998, that published the works of more than 20 composers for 15 years.

To date Syler has had over 400 performances of his compositions all over the world and has been in guest residence at more than 25 colleges and universities. He has been the subject of a doctoral dissertation Wind Ensemble Compositions of James Syler and discussed extensively in two others. He was featured in the book A Composer's Insight: Thoughts, Analysis and Commentary on Contemporary Masterpieces for Wind Band; Volume 1 by Timothy Salzman. Syler is currently on faculty at the University of Texas at San Antonio where he teaches composition, orchestration, and music history courses.

== Life ==
Syler was born in Hyde Park, New York and spent time growing up in both New York and Florida. His musical training began at age nine when he joined his elementary school band as a percussionist and continued at age sixteen with piano lessons. He received his bachelor's degree in Music Education from Northern Illinois University in 1983. His Master of Music Degree is in studio writing and media production from the University in Miami, Florida, conferred in 1988. During his time in Miami he met and studied with composer Alfred Reed, an important figure in the wind ensemble world. Though he met and studied with Reed, Syler was mostly interested in film score composing during his time at the University of Miami. In 1991 he continued graduate work at the University of Texas at Austin towards the DMA in Composition. While at Texas Syler studied with Karl Korte. In 1992 Syler decided to leave school and struck out on his own to freelance as a composer. He reached out to Michael Colgrass and they worked together in the summer of 1993 and winter of 1994. From 1995 to 1998, he was on the faculty at Flagler College in St. Augustine, Florida, which he left in 1998. He then was on faculty at Florida Atlantic University from 1998 to 2001. In 2001 he began his current position at the University of Texas-San Antonio.

== Works ==
James Syler is mostly known for his works for wind ensemble but has contributed significant works for orchestra, chorus, and chamber mediums as well.

Hound of Heaven (1988) for wind ensemble won the 1993 Arnald Gabriel Composition Award and the 1993 National Band Association Award. Syler describes it as a "program symphony in six movements" based upon the poem of the same name by British poet Francis Thompson. The story the poem depicts is of God as the loving hound in pursuit of the lost hare; the individual soul. It was recorded in 2008 by the Rutgers Wind Ensemble, William Berz Conductor, and can often be found on programs of the finest collegiate and university wind ensembles every year. Minton's Playhouse (1994) is an eclectic piece that has enjoyed popularity from its conception. Conceived for solo saxophone quartet and wind ensemble, it is also in a third stream style. It has been recorded by the Illinois State University Wind Symphony, Stephen Steele, Conductor in 2002. Minton's Playhouse, Storyville(composed in 1996), and a recent commission Congo Square(composed in 2014), make up the suite Three Places in Jazz. A unique triptych musically painting historically significant places to the jazz canon. Symphony No. 1 'Blue' (1999) is Syler's largest composition. Composed for Soprano, Chorus, and Wind Ensemble, it is a work of considerable substance. The text is original to Syler and is based upon the rebirth of oneself once the pit of despair is reached. Change is inevitable because of this threshold, therefore the previous self can no longer exist. Syler weaves the narrative using the soloist, chorus and ensemble to create unique textures and a powerful composition. The piece was recorded in 2002 by the University of Miami Wind Ensemble, Gary Green, Conductor. The Temptation of St. Anthony, a follow piece to Symphony No. 1 'Blue' for Chorus and Wind Ensemble, was commissioned and premiered by the Texas A&M University-Commerce Wind Ensemble, Phillip Clements, Conductor. Dear Sarah (1998) is for SATB Chorus and piano. This piece is a setting of a letter from the Civil War by Major Sullivan Ballou to his wife who died just days later in battle. The piece has gained significant popularity and is published by Santa Barbara Publishing company as a part of the Jo-Michael Scheibe Choral Series. It was recorded by the University of Miami Chorale in 2002, Jo-Michael Scheibe, Conductor. In 2006 Syler was commissioned by the Houston Chamber Orchestra. The resulting piece was the three movement virtuosic American Dances for string orchestra. 2009 brought a commission from the San Antonio Symphony. The eight-minute energetic and heroic overture Gearbox was born from that commission.

In addition to these collegiate/professional level works, Syler has also contributed four works to an educational series at FJH music. His Country Bandstand, Cantique and Hocus Pocus are all published by FJH and are of moderate difficulty without sacrificing any of Syler's compositional voice. The fourth work, Galop is an edition of Arthur Bird's only work for band, Galop.
