= Haviland, New York =

- Census-designated place
- Location of Haviland, New York
- Coordinates: 41°45′50″N 73°54′25″W
- Country: United States
- State: New York
- County: Dutchess
- Town: Hyde Park

Area
  - Total: 4.97 sq mi (12.86 km^{2})
  - Land: 4.93 sq mi (12.76 km^{2})
  - Water: 0.039 sq mi (0.10 km^{2})
- Elevation: 233 ft (71 m)

Population (2020)
  - Total: 4,174
  - Density: 847.1/sq mi (327.07/km^{2})
- Time zone: UTC-5 (Eastern (EST))
  - Summer (DST): UTC-4 (EDT)
- ZIP Codes: 12538 (Hyde Park); 12601 (Poughkeepsie)
- FIPS code: 36-32776
- GNIS feature ID: 1867406

Haviland is a community and census-designated place (CDP) in Dutchess County, New York, United States. The population was 4,174 at the 2020 census. It is part of the Kiryas Joel–Poughkeepsie–Newburgh, NY Metropolitan Statistical Area as well as the larger New York–Newark–Bridgeport, NY-NJ-CT-PA Combined Statistical Area.

Haviland is in the southern portion of the town of Hyde Park. The Eleanor Roosevelt National Historic Site is located within the community.

== Geography ==
Haviland is located in west-central Dutchess County at 41°46′0″N 73°54′5″W (41.7668, -73.9015). New York State Route 9G (Violet Avenue) is the main road through the community, leading south 5 miles (8 km) to Poughkeepsie. The western border of the hamlet is defined by the Maritje Kill.

According to the United States Census Bureau, the CDP has a total area of 3.9 square miles (10.1 km^{2}), of which 3.9 square miles (10.0 km^{2}) is land and 0.04 square miles (0.1 km^{2}), or 0.91%, is water.

== Demographics ==
Historical population
Census	Pop.	Note	%±
2000	3,710		—
2010	3,634		−2.0%
2020	4,174		14.9%
U.S. Decennial Census

=== 2020 census ===
As of the 2020 census, Haviland had a population of 4,174. The median age was 45.4 years. 19.6% of residents were under the age of 18 and 20.0% of residents were 65 years of age or older. For every 100 females there were 99.6 males, and for every 100 females age 18 and over there were 98.4 males age 18 and over.

94.0% of residents lived in urban areas, while 6.0% lived in rural areas.

There were 1,603 households in Haviland, of which 27.9% had children under the age of 18 living in them. Of all households, 50.7% were married-couple households, 15.5% were households with a male householder and no spouse or partner present, and 25.0% were households with a female householder and no spouse or partner present. About 24.6% of all households were made up of individuals and 12.2% had someone living alone who was 65 years of age or older.

There were 1,688 housing units, of which 5.0% were vacant. The homeowner vacancy rate was 1.6% and the rental vacancy rate was 3.2%.

Racial composition as of the 2020 census
Race	Number	Percent
White	3,278	78.5%
Black or African American	278	6.7%
American Indian and Alaska Native	9	0.2%
Asian	63	1.5%
Native Hawaiian and Other Pacific Islander	0	0.0%
Some other race	165	4.0%
Two or more races	381	9.1%
Hispanic or Latino (of any race)	395	9.5%

=== 2000 census ===
As of the census of 2000, there were 3,710 people, 1,417 households, and 1,031 families residing in the CDP. The population density was 958.5 inhabitants per square mile (370.1/km^{2}). There were 1,446 housing units at an average density of 373.6 per square mile (144.2/km^{2}). The racial makeup of the CDP was 93.23% White, 2.91% African American, 0.08% Native American, 1.75% Asian, 0.57% from other races, and 1.46% from two or more races. Hispanic or Latino of any race were 2.24% of the population.

There were 1,417 households, out of which 33.3% had children under the age of 18 living with them, 58.4% were married couples living together, 11.4% had a female householder with no husband present, and 27.2% were non-families. 21.6% of all households were made up of individuals, and 9.2% had someone living alone who was 65 years of age or older. The average household size was 2.61 and the average family size was 3.03.

In the CDP, the population was spread out, with 25.8% under the age of 18, 7.0% from 18 to 24, 27.8% from 25 to 44, 25.0% from 45 to 64, and 14.3% who were 65 years of age or older. The median age was 39 years. For every 100 females, there were 90.0 males. For every 100 females age 18 and over, there were 92.0 males.

The median income for a household in the CDP was $47,772, and the median income for a family was $54,861. Males had a median income of $48,021 versus $28,793 for females. The per capita income for the CDP was $21,174. About 7.5% of families and 7.4% of the population were below the poverty line, including 8.2% of those under age 18 and 6.1% of those age 65 or over.
