= Craig Capano =

American soccer player (born 1956)

Personal information
- Full name: Craig Capano
- Date of birth: July 7, 1985 (age 41)
- Place of birth: Hyde Park, New York, U.S.
- Height: 5 ft 7 in (1.70 m)
- Position: Midfielder

Youth career
- 2001: Chicago Sockers

Senior career*
Years	Team	Apps	(Gls)
2002–2006	Chicago Fire	22	(1)

International career^{‡}
2004	United States U-20	4	(1)
- * Club domestic league appearances and goals as of 3 March 2007 ‡ National team caps and goals as of 9 December 2020

Craig Capano (born July 7, 1985) is an American soccer player, who last played for the Chicago Fire of Major League Soccer.

Capano was selected 17th overall in the 2002 MLS SuperDraft by the Fire, (the youngest player ever drafted by the Fire at the age of sixteen) having elected to forgo college to focus on his professional career. Before joining the Fire, Capano had spent two years at the USSF's Bradenton Academy training with the U-17 U.S. national team.

Capano saw little playing time with the Fire, playing 92 minutes over four games in his first season and 122 minutes over 5 games in his second. In 2004, his third season, he appeared to have reached a turning point, earning 440 minutes, scoring his first MLS goal, and being widely rated as one of the team's better players when he was finally given consistent playing time toward the end of the year. However, he saw no time in 2005 after undergoing surgery on March 7, 2005, to repair a tear in his left anterior cruciate ligament, or in 2006. He was waived at the end of the latter season.

Despite playing little in MLS, Capano was a vital player for the U-20 US national team, along with other notables such as Eddie Gaven, Freddy Adu, Danny Szetela, and Jonathan Spector. He played in all four games of the 2004 Northern Ireland Milk Cup and served as the U-20 Men's National Team captain that July, helping the squad to finish 6th, also scoring the game's lone goal on April 21 for a 1–0 win over Haiti's U-20.

As of March, 2007, Capano was known to be training in camp with New York Red Bulls. Throughout his career, Capano - widely seen as a skillful player - has battled the perception that he was too small and slight to forge a successful career in MLS.

== Career statistics ==
Club performance			League		Cup		League Cup		Continental		Total	
Season	Club	League	Apps	Goals	Apps	Goals	Apps	Goals	Apps	Goals	Apps	Goals
USA			League		Open Cup		League Cup		North America		Total	
2002	Chicago Fire	Major League Soccer	4	0								
2003	Chicago Fire	Major League Soccer	5	0								
2004	Chicago Fire	Major League Soccer	13	1								
2005	Chicago Fire	Major League Soccer	0	0								
2006	Chicago Fire	Major League Soccer	0	0								
2007	Chicago Fire	Major League Soccer	0	0								
Total	USA		22	1								
Career total			22	1								
