= Hyde Park Central Schools =

School district in New York, United States

The Hyde Park Central School District is a public school district located in Hyde Park, New York. The district enrollment is estimated at 4,200 students at the end of the 2014/15 school year. in six schools in grades K–12. The district superintendent is Dr. Pedro Roman. The seventh school in the district was Hyde Park Elementary School. However, due to declining student enrollment in the district, the school was closed after the end of the 2011/12 school year, despite protests from other citizens. That school is currently used for the pupil personnel services; those offices moved into the building in December 2012.

Census-designated places (counted in New York as Hamlets) in the school district include Haviland, Hyde Park, Marist College, Salt Point, and Staatsburg. The district includes most of the Town of Hyde Park and extends into the following towns: Clinton, Pleasant Valley, Poughkeepsie, and Rhinebeck.

== History ==
The centralized Hyde Park School District was established in 1938. In 1940, Franklin Delano Roosevelt gave a dedication address for three new schools in the district, which were Hyde Park Elementary, Violet Avenue Elementary, and Franklin D. Roosevelt High School. A new Franklin D. Roosevelt high school was built in 1963, and the former building became Haviland Middle School.

Carole Pickering was superintendent before 2010. Greer Rychcik was superintendent from 2010 until 2020. Aviva Kafka, already an employee of the district, became its superintendent in 2020. Kafka retired at the end of the 2022-2023 school year, with Dr. Pedro Roman chosen to replace her. He became the current superintendent in July 2023.

== Schools ==
Elementary schools

- Netherwood Elementary School
- North Park Elementary School
- Ralph R. Smith Elementary School
- Violet Avenue Elementary School

Middle school

- Haviland Middle School

High school

- Franklin D. Roosevelt High School
