= Wales House (Hyde Park, New York) =

Historic house in New York, United States

- U.S. National Register of Historic Places
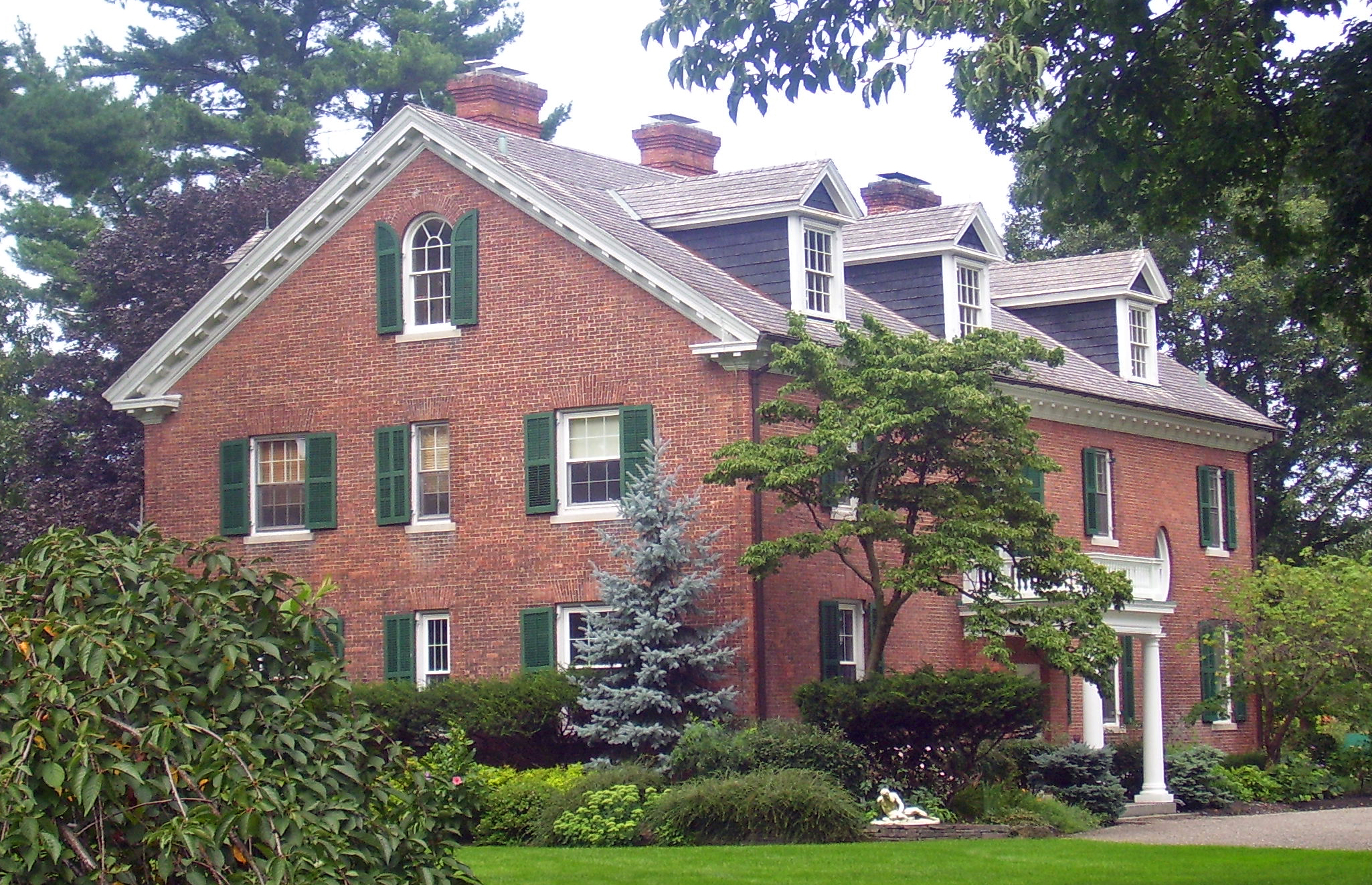
- East elevation and south profile, 2008

- Location within New York Location within the United States
- Interactive map showing the location of Wales House
- Location: Hyde Park, NY
- Coordinates: 41°47′30″N 73°56′21″W
- Area: 5.5 acres (2.2 ha)
- Built: 1898
- Architect: Charles Follen McKim
- Architectural style: Colonial Revival
- NRHP reference No.: 93000858
- Added to NRHP: August 19, 1993

The Wales House is located on West Market Street near the center of Hyde Park, New York, United States. It is a large brick house dating to the end of the 19th century, an early application of the Colonial Revival architectural style by architect Charles Follen McKim of the New York City firm of McKim, Mead and White.

It was built by Frederick William Vanderbilt, owner of the estate next door, for Edward Wales, his secretary. In 1993 it was added to the National Register of Historic Places.

== Property ==
There are six buildings and structures on the 5.5-acre (2.2 ha) lot, situated on land that gently slopes down towards the Hudson River to the west, with a more densely developed residential street, Doty Avenue, to the east. Four of them are considered contributing resources to its listing on the National Register.

The house itself is a two-story, four-bay brick building, with its front facade facing east, parallel to the road. It is topped with a shingled gabled roof pierced by three brick chimneys and three gabled dormer windows on the east. The roofline is marked by moderately overhanging eaves.

Louvered shutters flank most of the windows, and they have stone sills. The center bay of the second story has a rounded-arch window. The main entrance is located in the third bay, slightly off-center. It consists of a wooden Dutch door, within a portico with molded architrave and topped with a turned balustrade. There is a similar, less decorative portico on the north, and a porch with large Doric columns extending from the dining room on the west elevation.

Inside, the entrance leads to a large central hall, with many of the other rooms located off it. Many original finishings remain, and the floor plan has not been altered.

One the east of the house is its major outbuilding, a gable-roofed clapboard garage built in the early 20th century. A cast iron fence and stone wall, both contributing structures as they were part of the original construction, run along the eastern edge of the property. The swimming pool and pool house to the southwest are of more recent construction and are non-contributing.

== History ==
Charles Follen McKim of McKim, Mead and White designed the house for Frederick William Vanderbilt along with the rest of his estate, located just to the north, in the late 1890s. At the time the land was also part of the estate. Vanderbilt and his wife, Louise Holmes, were unable to have children of their own and so were very generous to their friends, such as Edward Wales, who was also his private secretary.

McKim designed the house in the then-emerging Colonial Revival style, a contrast to the Beaux-Arts buildings such as Vanderbilt's mansion he is often remembered for. It featured Georgian touches like the dormers, balustrade and modillioned roofline, balancing some signs of modern influences like the widely spaced windows and off-center main entrance.

Wales moved in upon the house's completion in 1898, and remained there until his death in 1922. Afterwards, it became the residence of Herbert Shears, caretaker of the Vanderbilt estate. When Vanderbilt's niece donated the property to the federal government for use as a National Historic Site in 1938, the house's lot was subdivided to allow it to continue as Shears' private residence.

It has remained one ever since. The swimming pool and pool house were added in the later 20th century, but there have been no major alterations to the property otherwise.
