= Taylan Yıldız =

Turkish politician

Vedat Taylan Yıldız
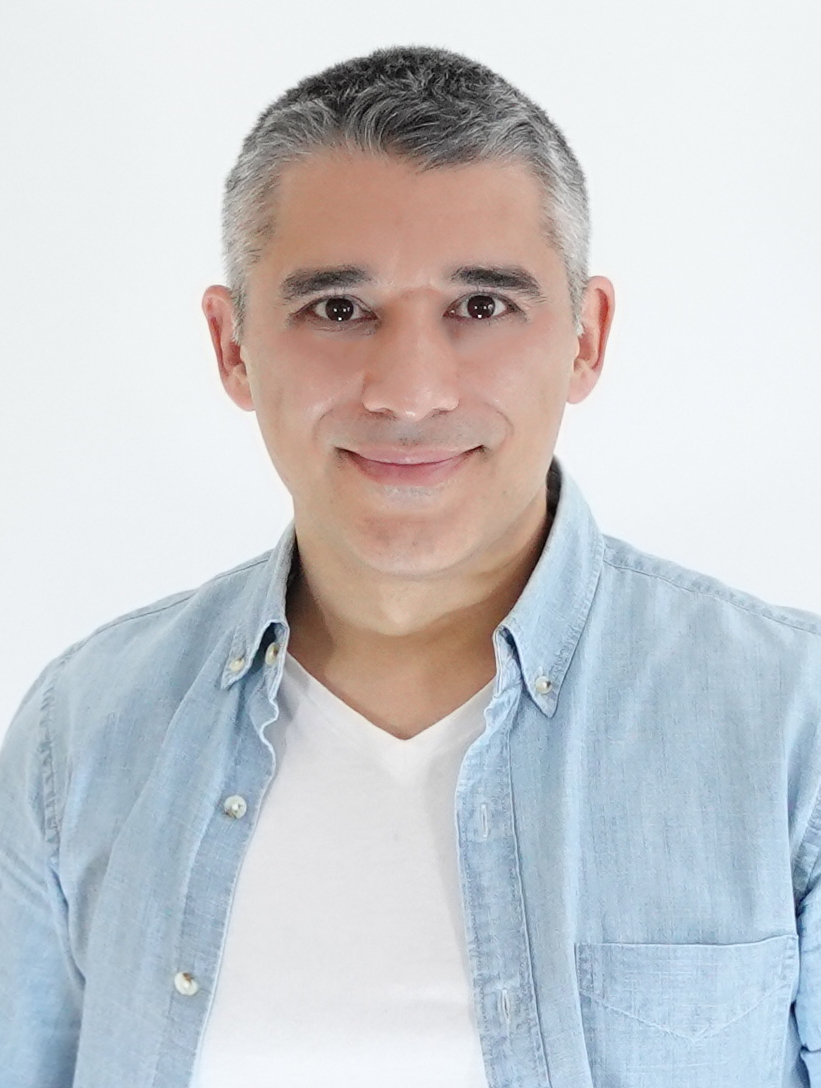

Councilmember from Sarıyer
- In office 31 March 2019 – 15 March 2023
- Preceded by: Multi-member district
- Constituency: Sarıyer (2019)

Personal details
- Born: Vedat Taylan Yıldız; 7 May 1980 (age 45) Ankara, Turkey
- Party: Good Party
- Education: Engineering, Business Administration
- Alma mater: Boğaziçi University, University of Massachusetts, Stanford University

Vedat Taylan Yıldız (nicknamed as İnternetçi abi [lit. meaning "elder brother who provides internet"]; born 7 May 1980) is a Turkish politician. He is member of the Good Party group in the Municipal Council of Istanbul.

== Career ==
He started working at Google after studying at Boğaziçi and Stanford Universities. He returned to Turkey to support the opposition in 2017 constitutional referendum.

He learned to read and write at an early age and started primary school in İzmir. Then he studied at İzmir Karşıyaka Anatolian High School and İzmir Science High School respectively. Yıldız, who graduated from Boğaziçi University in 2001, completed his master's degree in industrial engineering at Massachusetts University. In 2003, he was accepted into the marketing program of Stanford University's PhD in business administration. When he returned Turkey in 2017 in order to contribute to "no campaign", he joined IYI Party as a founder and became the vice chairman of the party.

Yıldız came to prominence in 2020 after Tevfik Göksu, the deputy head of the AKP group in the Istanbul Metropolitan Municipality (IBB) Assembly, addressed him as "internet friend." In 2020, he started a campaign with the hashtags "internet brother" and "we want internet in the metro" to provide free internet service on the Istanbul subway. The campaign resulted in the start of free internet service on the Istanbul metro in October 2021.

Yıldız distributed tablet computers to children and young people during the online education process that started with the COVID-19 Pandemic with the project he launched under the name "internetetsiz köy kalmasın." Yıldız argues that taxes on internet, mobile phones and computers should be reduced and that young people should be free on social media networks.

On March 12, 2023, he opened a live broadcast on social media platforms and asked the public the question "Should I resign from my current position and become a parliamentary candidate?". After a large majority stated that this was the right decision, he resigned from Sarıyer and IBB Assembly memberships on March 15, 2023.

On June 19, 2023, he announced his resignation from IYI Party.
