= Justin Taylan =

American historian

Justin R. Taylan (born September 22, 1977) is an American author and historian specializing in battles and wrecks within the Pacific Theater of Operations during World War II. He is also the founder of Pacific Wrecks, a non-profit organization devoted to cataloging and sharing information about the Pacific Theater of World War II and the Korean War.

== Early life and education ==
Taylan grew up in Hyde Park, New York and went to Franklin D. Roosevelt High School where his father taught as a science teacher. Taylan's inteterst in the history of World War II began while still in high school. His grandfather, Carl R. Thien was a United States Army combat photographer with the 201st Counter Intelligence Corps, who served in New Guinea and the Philippines during World War II. It was his stories that inspired Taylan's first book, "No Place for a Picnic", an illustrated graphic novel which chronicled Thien's experiences during the war. The book was written and illustrated by Taylan. After publication, the book received high praise, including placement in the prestigious selection list for the New York Public Library where it went on to become a feature book in 1996. After high school, Taylan studied Electronic Media, Arts, and Communications at Rensselaer Polytechnic Institute.

== Pacific wrecks ==
Pacific Wreck Database began as a repository of known World War II wreck sites and was an extension of a project Taylan started while in his senior year at Rensselaer. In its first year, the site received over one million hits and has become recognized internationally as an historical entity.

Taylan has been credited in the identification on wrecks, discovering new wreck sites and returning personal artifacts to family. He has visited hundreds of battlefields, shipwrecks and crash sites in the Pacific to add to his database.

In 2003, Taylan was credited with the discovery of a Japanese Mitsubishi A6M2 Zero in the Owen Stanley Range of New Guinea and helped with the Japanese government to recover the pilot's remains. Taylan believes his website can help resolve some of the war's 74,000 MIA cases, of which 48,000 were from the Pacific Theater.

Taylan is an advocate of the protection of these historic sites, and actively discourages illegal salvage or destruction of these priceless relics. For his work to preserve the legacy of the World War II genereration, Taylan was recognized by the World War II Veterans Committee with the Hunter Scott Achievement Award.

== Solomon Islands controversy ==
On November 6, 2006, Taylan and his Pacific Wrecks crew sailed into the Solomon Islands to explore Guadalcanal Campaign battlefield sites. The team inadvertently stumbled onto a salvage operation underway at Ballale Island which housed a Japanese air base during the war. When the group went to inform the Solomon Island Royal Police of what they believed to be an illegal salvage operation, their passports were confiscated and they were confined to their boat and charged with entering the country illegally. Taylan and his crew were under boat arrest for six weeks to await trial. On December 17, Taylan and his colleagues were found guilty and each paid a fine of 800 Solomon Islands dollars (US$108).
