= Mulhern =

Mulhern is an Irish (Midlands and Ulster) Catholic family name. It is the anglicised form of the Gaelic Ó Maoilchiaráin 'descendant of Maoilchiaráin', a personal name.

== People ==
- Elliot James Mulhern (born 1989), American drummer
- Francis Mulhern (born 1952), British critical theorist
- Francis J. Mulhern, associate dean of research at the Medill School of Journalism at Northwestern University
- John Mulhern (1927–2007), American ice hockey player
- Lee Mulhern also known as Lee Matthews and Lee.M (born 1988), Irish singer-songwriter
- Mary Mulhern (born 1959), American councilwoman of the City Council in Tampa, Florida
- Matt Mulhern (born 1960), American actor
- Quinn Mulhern (born 1984), American mixed martial artist
- Richard Mulhern (born 1955), Canadian ice hockey defenceman
- Ryan Mulhern (born 1973), American ice hockey player
- Stephen Mulhern (born 1977), British broadcaster and entertainer

== Places ==
- Mulhern House, historic home located at Wappingers Falls in Dutchess County, New York.

== See also ==
- Mulhearn
