= Peter Mesier =

Peter Mesier may refer to:

- Peter Mesier Jr., American merchant and politician
- Peter Mesier Sr., his father, American merchant and politician
