= 1808 New York City Common Council election =

1808 New York City aldermanic election
- November 1808

All 10 seats in the New York City Common Council 6 seats needed for a majority
	First party	Second party
Party	Democratic-Republican	Federalist
Seats before	7	3
Seats won	6	4
Seat change	▼1	▲1
Popular vote	4,071	3,438
Percentage	54.21%	45.79%
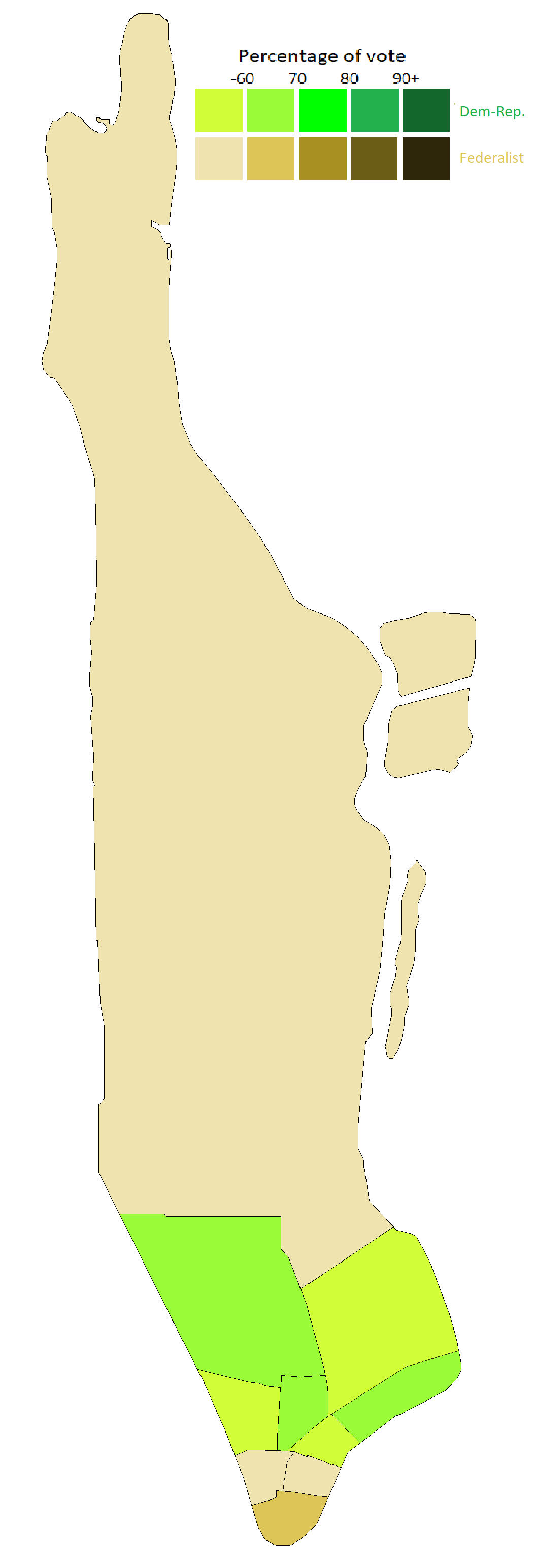
- Results by ward

Elections to the New York City Common Council were held in November 1808. The incumbent Democratic-Republican Party retained its majority but the Federalists gained one seat and increased their share of the vote in every ward.

== Results ==
First Ward
Party	Candidate	Votes	%
Federalist	Peter Mesier Jr.	390	64.04
Democratic-Republican	John Haff	219	35.96
Majority		171	28.08

Second Ward
Party	Candidate	Votes	%
Federalist	S.M. Hopkins	350	52.24
Democratic-Republican	John Haff	320	47.76
Majority		30	4.48

Third Ward
Party	Candidate	Votes	%
Federalist	Charles Dickinson	415	53.34
Democratic-Republican	John Haff	363	46.66
Majority		52	6.68

Fourth Ward
Party	Candidate	Votes	%
Democratic-Republican	James Drake	521	51.13
Federalist	James Tylee	498	48.87
Majority		23	2.26

Fifth Ward
Party	Candidate	Votes	%
Democratic-Republican	John Bingham	655	56.03
Federalist	James Tylee	514	43.97
Majority		141	12.06

Sixth Ward
Party	Candidate	Votes	%
Democratic-Republican	John D. Miller	547	64.20
Federalist	James Tylee	305	35.80
Majority		242	28.40

Seventh Ward
Party	Candidate	Votes	%
Democratic-Republican	Jacob Mott	519	67.49
Federalist	James Tylee	250	32.51
Majority		269	34.98

Eighth Ward
Party	Candidate	Votes	%
Democratic-Republican	Thurston Wood	408	62.96
Federalist	William H. Robinson	240	37.04
Majority		168	25.93

Ninth Ward
Party	Candidate	Votes	%
Federalist	Nicholas Fish	135	51.33
Democratic-Republican	Henry Post	128	48.67
Majority		7	2.66

Tenth Ward
Party	Candidate	Votes	%
Democratic-Republican	Man Minthorne	391	52.91
Federalist	Samuel Stillwell	348	47.09
Majority		168	25.93
