= Dutchess Company Superintendent's House =

Historic house in New York, United States

- Dutchess Company; Superintendent's House
- U.S. National Register of Historic Places
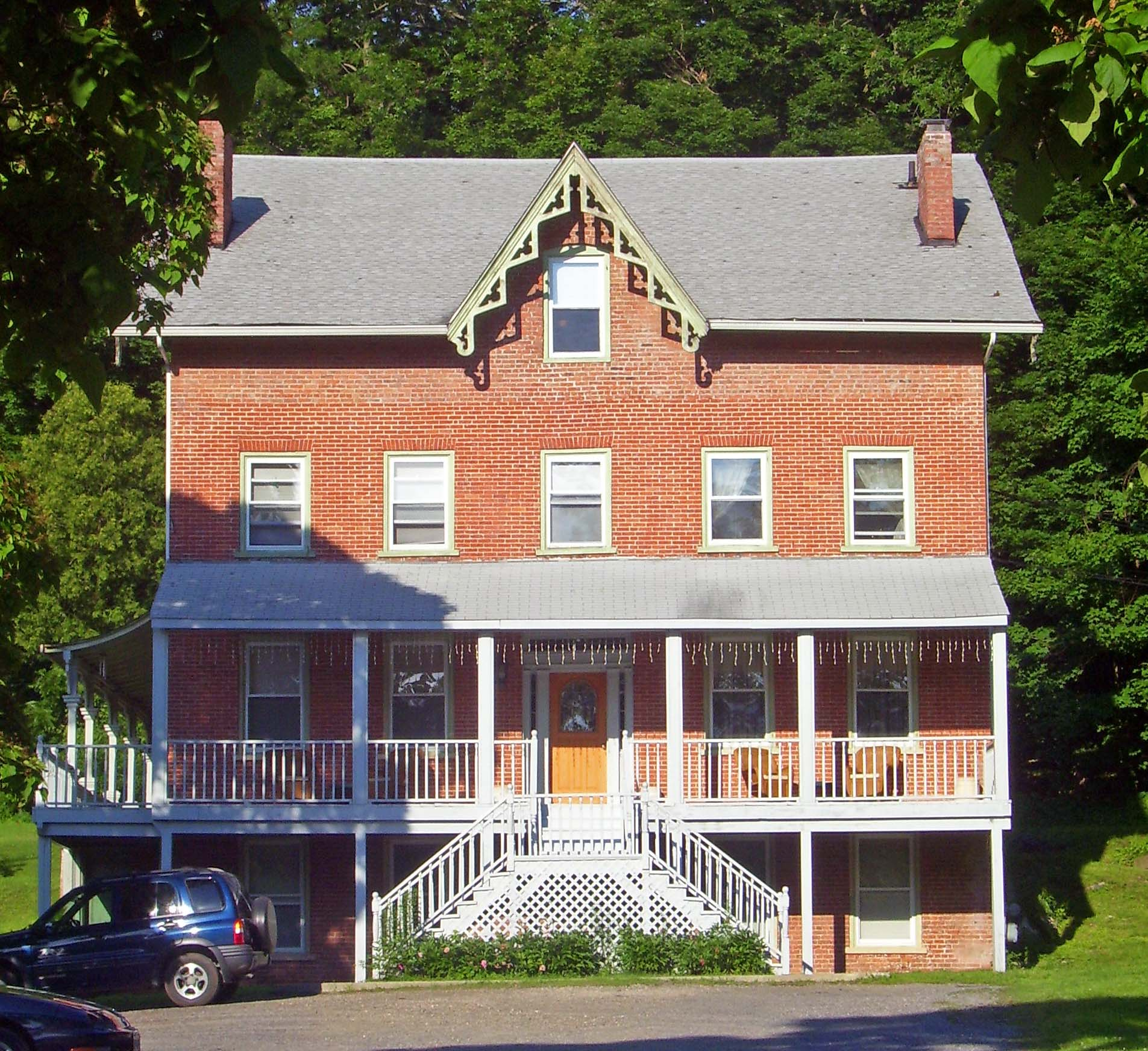
- Front (west) elevation of house, 2008

- Location within New York Location within the United States
- Interactive map showing the location of Dutchess Company Superintendent’s House
- Location: Wappingers Falls, NY
- Nearest city: Poughkeepsie
- Coordinates: 41°35′38″N 73°55′30″W
- Built: ca. 1848
- Architectural style: Greek Revival, Gothic Revival
- MPS: Wappingers Falls MRA
- NRHP reference No.: 84002371
- Added to NRHP: 1984

The Dutchess Company Superintendent's House is a home located on Market Street in the western corner of the village of Wappingers Falls, New York, United States. It is a large brick residence that was built as housing for the manager of the Dutchess Company, a large local printing works, shortly after the plant was built in 1848.

It is primarily in the Greek Revival architectural style, with some Gothic Revival decorative touches. In 1984 it was added to the National Register of Historic Places.

== Building ==
The house is a three-story, five-bay brick building with a symmetrical front facade. The front entrance and its sidelights are centrally located on a shed-roofed porch built in the mid 20th-century. It replaced an original veranda that wrapped around all but the east side. A portion was left on the north side, along with its Gothic Revival posts, capitals and other trim.

On the roofline, a steeply pitched central gable, decorated with Gothic Revival vergeboard, reinforces the entrance. There are two brick chimneys at either end of the roof.

The inside floor plan is the standard Greek Revival central-hall style. The entrance's sidelights and full transom are also hallmarks of that style. There are no outbuildings.

== History ==
The house was built in 1848, shortly after the Dutchess Company was incorporated. The first superintendent, a Mr. Radclift, was its first occupant.

It remained in company ownership until the company failed in the 20th century, at which point it was purchased by the then-superintendent, William Bogle. It has remained a private home ever since.

== Aesthetics ==
The house's design and location reflect some social considerations as well as aesthetic ideals of its time. Its Greek Revival scale and mass reflect the factory superintendent's superior position within the community's industrial hierarchy, as well as its location some distance away from the plant and worker housing in the center of town, echoing the superintendent's position distance from his subordinates. It was similar to the company owners' houses (none of which survive intact) in size, but unlike them it was located at the bottom of the hill, closer to the plant and the workers than they were.

Its decorative touches, such as the piazza-style original veranda, pointed gable and scroll-sawn vergeboard, suggest an embrace of the Picturesque mode then being popularized by Andrew Jackson Downing of nearby Newburgh. The house's placement in a wooded area near Wappinger Creek is also reflective of this ideal.
