= Bain Commercial Building =

- U.S. National Register of Historic Places
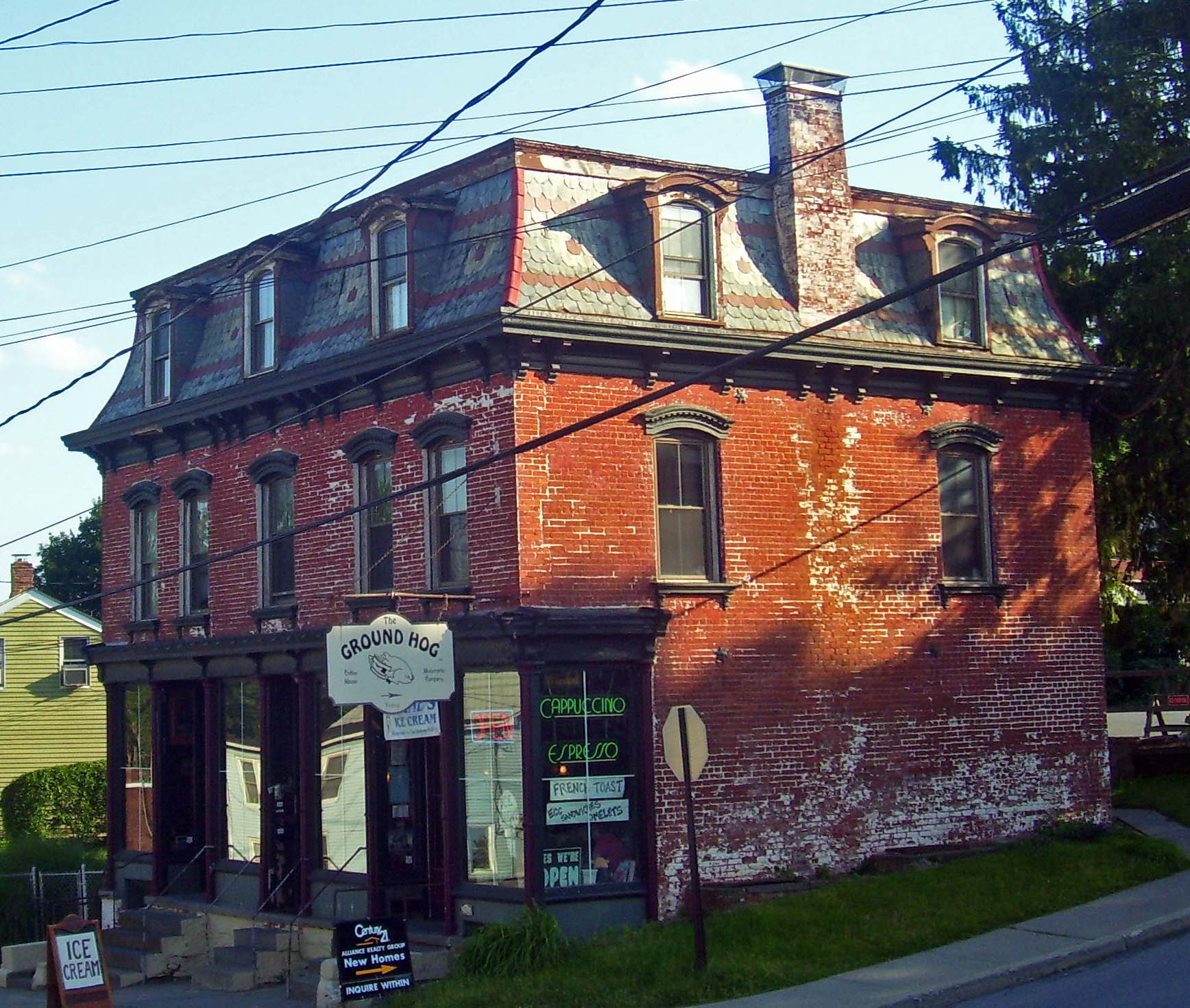
- East (front) elevation and north profile, 2008
- Location: Wappingers Falls, NY
- Nearest city: Poughkeepsie
- Coordinates: 41°36′04″N 73°55′14″W
- Built: 1875
- Architectural style: Second Empire
- MPS: Wappingers Falls MRA
- NRHP reference No.: 84002369
- Added to NRHP: 1984

The Bain Commercial Building is located at the corner of Church and West Main (NY 9D) streets in Wappingers Falls, New York, United States. It is a late 19th-century brick building that was listed on the National Register of Historic Places in 1984.

It is the only intact Second Empire-style building from that period in the village. It is also one of the few historic structures in the portion of the village west of Wappinger Creek in the Town of Poughkeepsie that was once known as Channingville before it merged with Wappingers Falls in 1871. It has not been altered significantly since its construction and continues in use as multiple-dwelling residences above and business space at street level.

== Building ==
The Bain building is a two-story five-by-five bay structure with the Second Empire's signature mansard roof, surfaced in polychrome slate. Its foundation is built into surface that slopes toward the creek, requiring steps to access the building through its front facade, where a central entry to the upper floors is flanked by separate, three-part storefronts themselves consisting of doors flanked by large bay windows.

The roofline is decorated with a bracketed and panelled cornice, echoed in smaller, less ornate scale above the storefronts. The five windows on the second story give way to three dormer windows on the roof, pierced by chimneys at the center of the north and south elevations. Cast iron columns support the structure where the facade elements intersect.

To better facilitate the building's conversion into apartments, wooden stairs and sheds have been added to the back. One original shed that remains is considered a contributing outbuilding.

== History ==
The Bain family is believed to have built the building in 1875, shortly after Channingville became part of the village. It was both their residence and their place of business, with the possibility of rental income from the other storefront.

In the 20th century, after the village's industries declined, the upper residences were converted into apartments and the appropriate modifications made to the building by the Bain descendants who still owned the property. That mix of uses continues today, with one of the storefronts home to a coffee shop.

== Aesthetics ==
Detached Second Empire commercial buildings are not common in urban or suburban settings; the Bain building's development as such testifies to the minimal development of the Channingville area, particularly as it is some distance from the creek and the village's downtown. Its detachment made possible the more sophisticated applications of the style, such as the roofline, skewed upper window placement and polychrome slate roof.

== See also ==
- National Register of Historic Places listings in Dutchess County, New York
