= Hyde Park Reformed Dutch Church =

Historic church in New York, United States

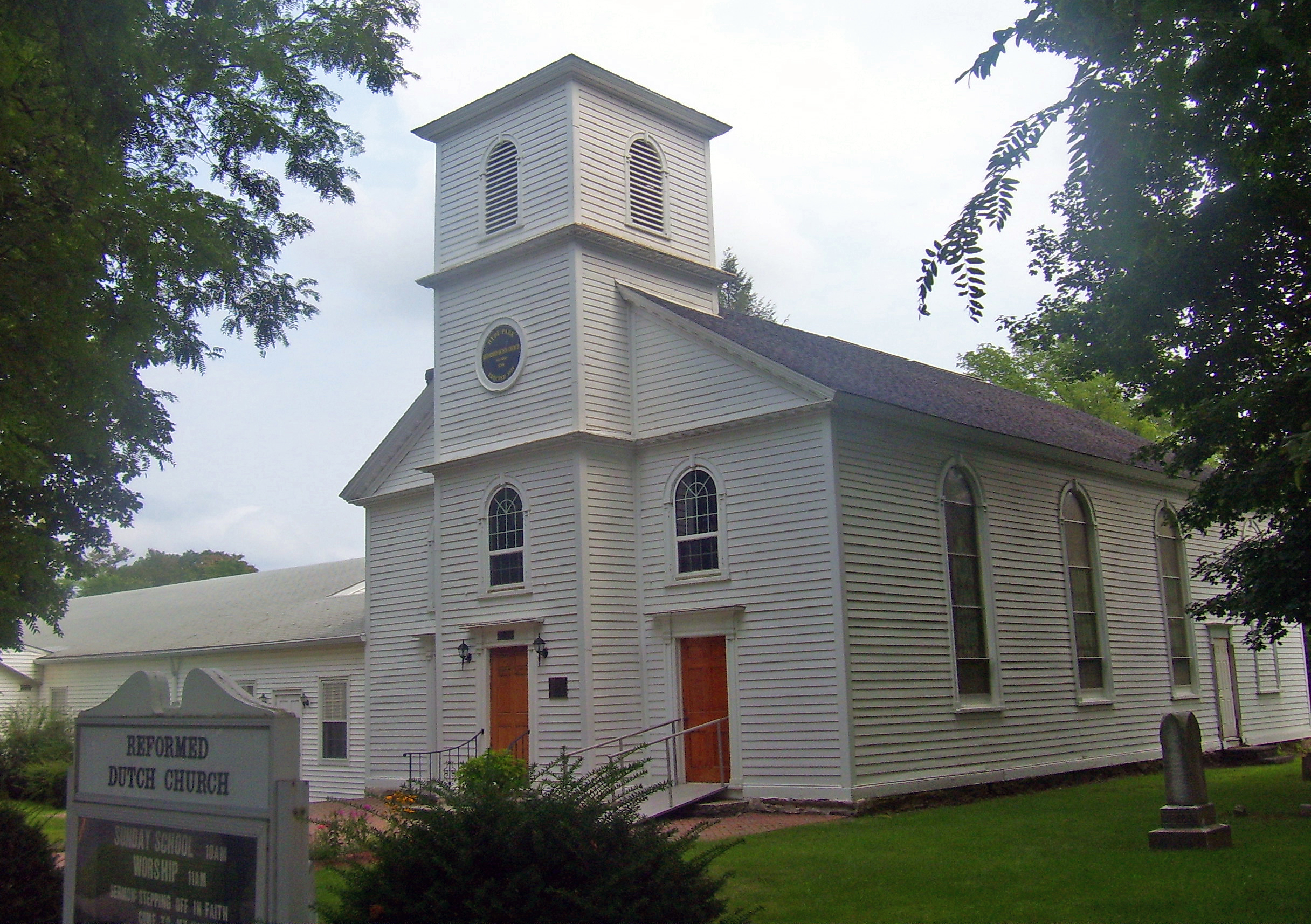
- West elevation and south profile, 2008

Religion
- Affiliation: Reformed Church in America
- Leadership: Thom Fiet
- Year consecrated: 1826

Location
- Location: Hyde Park, New York
- Interactive map of Hyde Park Reformed Dutch Church
- Coordinates: 41°47′31″N 73°56′10″W

Architecture
- Style: Federal
- Completed: 1826

Specifications
- Direction of façade: West
- Materials: Wood

U.S. National Register of Historic Places
- Added to NRHP: September 2, 1993
- NRHP Reference no.: 93000861

Website
- Hyde Park Dutch Reformed Church

Hyde Park Dutch Reformed Church is located on US 9 in the center of Hyde Park, New York, United States, just north of the post office and the junction with Market Street at the center of town. It is a complex of several buildings on a 2-acre (0.81 ha) lot.

The congregation traces its roots to a union church established in the community in 1789. It was formally organized within the Dutch Reformed Church three years later. The main church building was constructed in 1826 in the Federal style. In 1993 it, the church cemetery, parsonage and lecture hall were added to the National Register of Historic Places.

== Property ==
There are five buildings and the church cemetery on the lot, a flat grassy area with some tall trees. The cemetery and three of the buildings are considered contributing resources to the listing.

=== Church ===
The main church building is a two-story, three-bay frame building on a slightly exposed stone basement. It is sided in clapboard with an asphalt-shingled gabled roof topped by a four-story blunt steeple on the western (front) elevation. The northeast corner is pierced by a brick chimney.

A simple cornice marks the roofline around the entire building, with modillions in the end gables. On the front side, the central bay projects to form the base of the steeple. All three bays on the front elevation have a red paneled double wooden door surrounded by fluted pilasters with a projecting cornice on top. Above each one on the second story is a window topped with semicircular fanlight. At the attic is a decorative circular light. This is echoed by a round-arched louvered vent on each side of the steeple.

The north and south sides both have recessed round-arched stained glass windows — four on the north and three on the south. All have wooden surrounds and sills. There is a small entrance on the southern side.

Inside the pews are arranged with a center aisle leading to the raised pulpit, flanked by a pipe organ and backed by a decorative entablature with flanking pilasters. A wooden stairway leads to the balcony, supported by round wooden Doric columns with a frieze around the balcony's edge. The ceiling is embossed tin. Many of these finishes are original.

=== Other buildings and cemetery ===
To the north of the church is the parsonage, built a few years later. Its main block is similar in form and materials to the church. It adds a two-story western wing with a wraparound flat-roofed porch, supported by turned posts on the rear. Its interior finishes are original.

The lecture hall is located to the south of the church. It is a one-story frame building sided in clapboard with a gabled roof and pilasters at the corners. A plain cornice and frieze mark the roofline. There is a triangular vent in the east gable, and the main entrance on the west has a vestibule with pedimented roof and corner pilasters. A modern wooden door has a decorative surround. A one-story wing projects from the north side.

West and south of the church is the last of its contributing resources, the cemetery. It contains over a hundred tombstones, of sandstone, granite and marble, from a 200-year period starting in 1790. Their funerary art ranges from plain with a few death's heads on the earlier ones to a full range of common 19th-century motifs, such as urns and willows, on later ones.

A fellowship hall connects the east end of the church and the south side of the parsonage. There is also a small maintenance shed on the property. Architecturally sympathetic, they are of modern construction and considered non-contributing.

== History ==
Hyde Park received its name before the Revolution, but had few residents until just before it. After the war, the residents of the small community known at the time as Stoutenburgh's Landing, after one of its major landowners, realized they needed a church. They built a union church, for all denominations, with the understanding that the first one within it that built a congregation large enough to support its own building could have the union church. Three years later, in 1792, the Classis of Kingston recognized the Dutch Reformed Church in Hyde Park as a separate congregation, and they got the church. Luke Stoutenburgh donated the half-acre (2,025 m^{2}) to its south, and the new church grew.

The new church became known as the Reformed Church of Stoutsburg following the settlement's decision to call itself that in 1803. In 1817 it followed the village in adopting the name Hyde Park. Eight years later, by 1825, the original union church was too small for the congregation, so it was torn down to make way for the current building, completed the following year. The church is less ornamented than other Federal-style buildings in the Hudson Valley, owing to its use for religious purposes.

In 1833 the church bought the land to the north and built the parsonage on it. Two years later the church building itself was expanded by 17 feet (5.2 m) to the east and the current mahogany altar, given by another church in New York City, was added. There have been no renovations to the exterior since then.

Church records suggest the newest contributing resource, the lecture hall, was added sometime prior to 1858. Unlike the church and parsonage, it uses the Greek Revival style, which had come to displace the Federal style. In 1885 the last major renovation to the church, the addition of an Odell tracker pipe organ, came. It was necessary to cover over one of the south windows to accommodate the new instrument.

The fellowship hall connected the church and parsonage about 1960. In the early 2000s, a member of the congregation took it upon himself to restore the organ. Pieces were sent to a Maryland company for tuning; a North Carolina woman repainted the pipes.
