= United States Post Office (Lake Placid, New York) =

- US Post Office--Lake Placid
- U.S. National Register of Historic Places
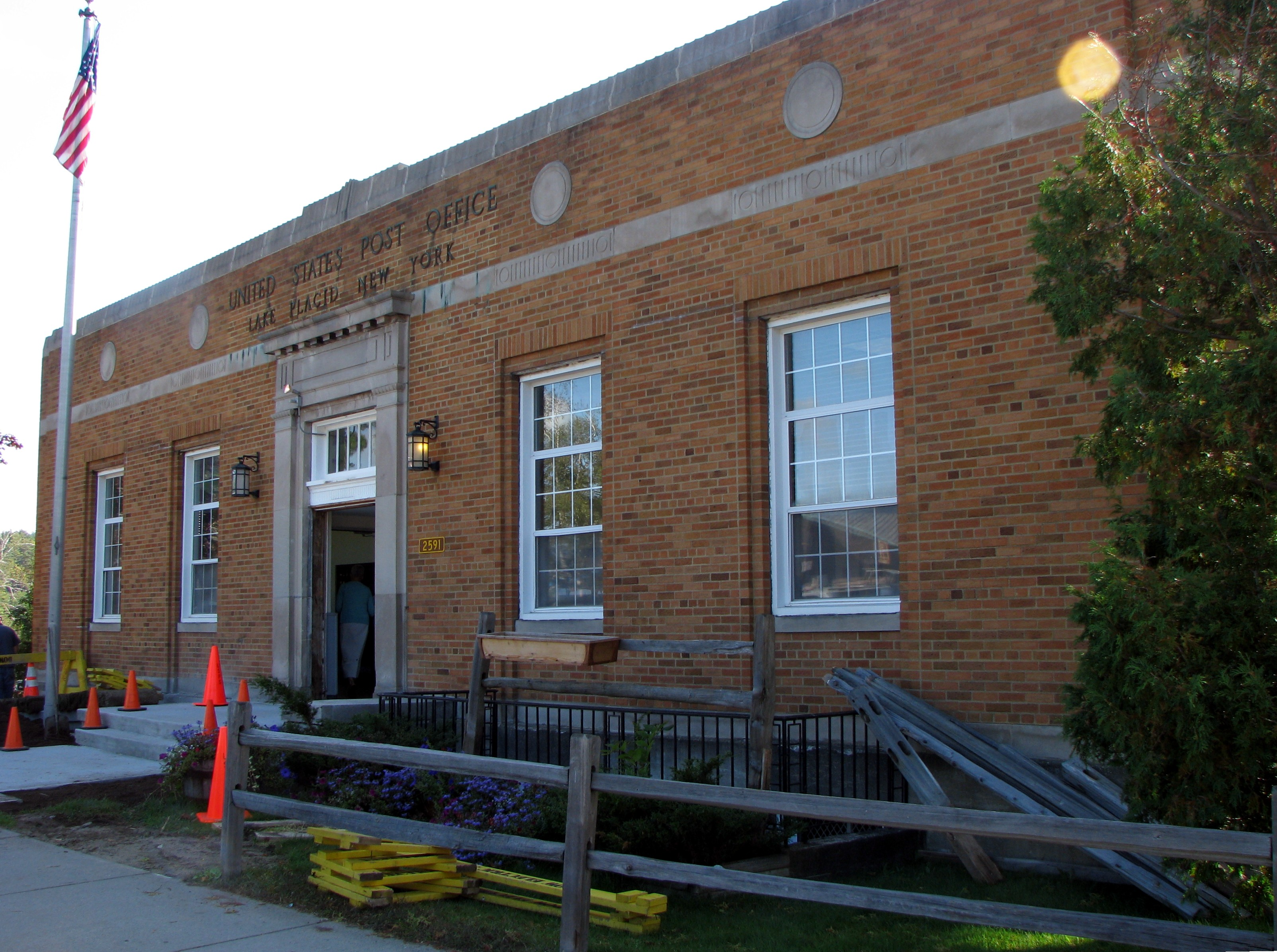
- U.S. Post Office, September 2008

- Location within New York Location within the United States
- Location: 2951 Main St., Lake Placid, New York
- Coordinates: 44°17′7″N 73°59′2″W
- Area: less than one acre
- Built: 1935
- Architect: Louis A. Simon, Henry Billings
- Architectural style: Colonial Revival
- MPS: US Post Offices in New York State, 1858-1943, TR
- NRHP reference No.: 88002339
- Added to NRHP: November 17, 1988

US Post Office-Lake Placid is a historic post office building located at Lake Placid in Essex County, New York, United States. It was designed and built 1935–1936, and is one of a number of post offices in New York State designed by the Office of the Supervising Architect of the Treasury Department under Louis A. Simon. The building is in the Colonial Revival style and is a one-story, five-bay, steel-framed building on a raised foundation with a cast-stone watertable and clad in orange/buff-colored brick. The interior features a group of murals executed in 1937 by Henry Billings.

It was listed on the National Register of Historic Places in 1988.
