= Peter Mesier Sr. =

American politician and merchant

Peter Mesier Sr. was an American merchant and politician who served as alderman of New York City's West ward from 1759 to 1763.

Peter was a merchant active in the East Indies trade, who owned several properties in the city, including a brewery. In 1776 a fire on the west side of Broadway consumed 15 of his properties. A loyalist during the American Revolution, he moved with his family to Wappingers Falls in Dutchess County after the fire. Mesier married Catherine Sleight; they had eight children:

- Peter Jr., a New York politician in the early 19th century.
- Matthew - married Joanna Schenck
- Abraham
- Catherine - married her cousin Peter A. Mesier
- Marie - married merchant David Lydig
- Jane - married John Suydam
- Phoebe
- Eliza - married Thomas Goelert

== Family ==
His paternal grandfather, Pieter Jansen Mesier, was born around 1631. He was a ship's carpenter and resided in New Amsterdam by 1659. He and his family lived near Fort Willem Hendrick until in 1673 Governor Anthony Colve ordered the land cleared in the course of renovations at the fort. He built a windmill west of Broadway on land purchased from the Van Cortlandts around 1682. Located on a bluff above the North River, it served as a landmark for navigation. The path leading to the mill from Broadway was called "Pieter Jansen's Lane".

In 1701, Pieter Jansen Mesier received a grant for a water lot at the end of Cortlandt Street. In 1760, his grandson, Abraham Mesier, obtained a second lot, extending the first. Abraham developed both lots, creating "Mesier's Slip" and built a wharf alongside it. The Paulus Hook ferry, began in July 1764 and operated from Paulus Hook to Mesier's dock at the foot of Courtland Street. The Mesiers held a financial interest in the ferry. In 1767 merchant Jacob Van Voorhis obtained the lease of the ferry operation. His partners were Abraham Mesier, Peter Mesier, and Abraham Bussing. In 1771, Abraham Mesier took over the lease. Abraham died around 1774 and his wife, Elizabeth, continued to operate the ferry until 1789.

Pieter Jansen Mesier married Marritje Willems; they had two sons: Abraham Pieters and Peter Pieters, and a daughter, Jannetje. Members of the First Reformed Dutch Church, they lived on "The Strand".

- Abraham Pieters was the father of Peter A. Mesier, a stationer and lithographer in New York City.
- Peter Pieters Mesier had four children:
  - Abraham
  - Peter Mesier Sr.
  - Elizabeth -married Abraham Bussing
  - Catherine -married Jacob Van Voorhis; she predeceased her father, leaving two sons, Jacob Jr. and John Van Voorhis.

== Works cited ==
- Suydam, Henry (1882). History and Reminiscences of the Mesier Family of Wappingers Creek.
