= Henry Billings =

American painter (1901–1985)

- Born: July 13, 1901; Bronxville, New York
- Died: October 1985; Sag Harbor, New York

Henry Billings (July 13, 1901 – October 1985) was an American artist. He was a painter, illustrator, muralist, and art instructor active in New York City. He was a grandson of John Shaw Billings, a surgeon and the first director of the New York Public Library.

== Life and work ==
Billings attended St. Paul's School in Concord, New Hampshire. He also studied at the Art Students League of New York, and was a member of the Art Colony of Woodstock, New York.

His painting style shows an interest in the mechanical and machinery, as well as an attraction to surrealism.

During the New Deal, Billings created a number of murals on commissions overseen by the Treasury Department's Section of Painting and Sculpture (later, the Section of Fine Arts). In 1936–37, he created a series of five murals depicting winter sports for the Lake Placid, New York post office. He also contributed murals to post offices in Medford, Massachusetts, Wappinger Falls, New York, and Columbia, Tennessee, and a striking mural of a panther which still hangs near the ladies' powder room in Radio City Music Hall at Rockefeller Center.

In 1945, Billings created a series of paintings for Life magazine depicting "strafing targets as they appear to the fighter pilot through the transparent rectangle of his reflector gunsight."

Billings died in Sag Harbor, New York, in October 1985.

== Selected works ==
=== Paintings ===
- "White Boats", circa 1929

=== Public art ===
- "Panther Mural", 1932, Radio City Music Hall, Rockefeller Center
- "Golden Triangle of Trade." 1939, Post Office of Medford, Massachusetts
- "Maury County Landscape", 1942, Post Office of Columbia, Tennessee

== See also ==
- Old Wappingers Falls Village Hall#Murals
