= Peter Mesier Jr. =

American politician

Peter Mesier Jr. (fl. 1810) was an American merchant and politician who served as alderman of New York City's 1st ward from 1807 to 1814 and again in 1819. He was the son of Peter Mesier Sr., a loyalist merchant from New York City who moved with the family to Wappingers Falls in Dutchess County shortly after a 1776 fire which had consumed much of the family's property on Broadway.

Serving as a Federalist, in 1812 he worked with fellow aldermen Nicholas Fish and Jacob Hull to introduce Isaac Hull as a guest of honor while he was given the freedom of the City. He served a similar role giving a banquet to James Lawrence in 1813.

During the War of 1812, Mesier served on the Committee of Defense. Apprehensive of the possibility of an invasion by British troops, in September 1814, he and four others wrote to Secretary of War James Monroe requesting that sixty-year old Major General Morgan Lewis be removed from command of the Third Military District, which included New York City. They cited as their reason a lack of public confidence in Lewis' ability to perform his duties due to "frequent indisposition". They further recommended either of two individuals, both holding military rank (and Federalist opinions); one was Nicholas Fish. The following month, Madison informed Lewis that in as much as the defense of New York would be handled by militia and volunteers, command of the Military District was transferred to Democratic-Republican governor Daniel D. Tompkins.

Such was his role as alderman that he was called "the Alderman" by his family. During his service he lived at 25 Beaver Street. He died of an illness while visiting his brother-in-law on Broadway on a site later occupied by the Astor House.

== Works cited ==
- Suydam, Henry (1882). History and Reminiscences of the Mesier Family of Wappingers Creek.

New York City alderman
1st ward
1807 – 1814
New York City alderman
1st ward
1819
