= Mulhearn =

Mulhearn is an Irish surname. Notable people with the surname include:

- Ken Mulhearn (1945–2018), English football player
- Tony Mulhearn (1939–2019), English political and trade unions campaigner and politician

== See also ==
- Darren Mulhearne (born 1973), Irish Gaelic football goalkeeper
- Mulhern
