= United States Post Office (Hyde Park, New York) =

- U.S. Post Office
- U.S. National Register of Historic Places
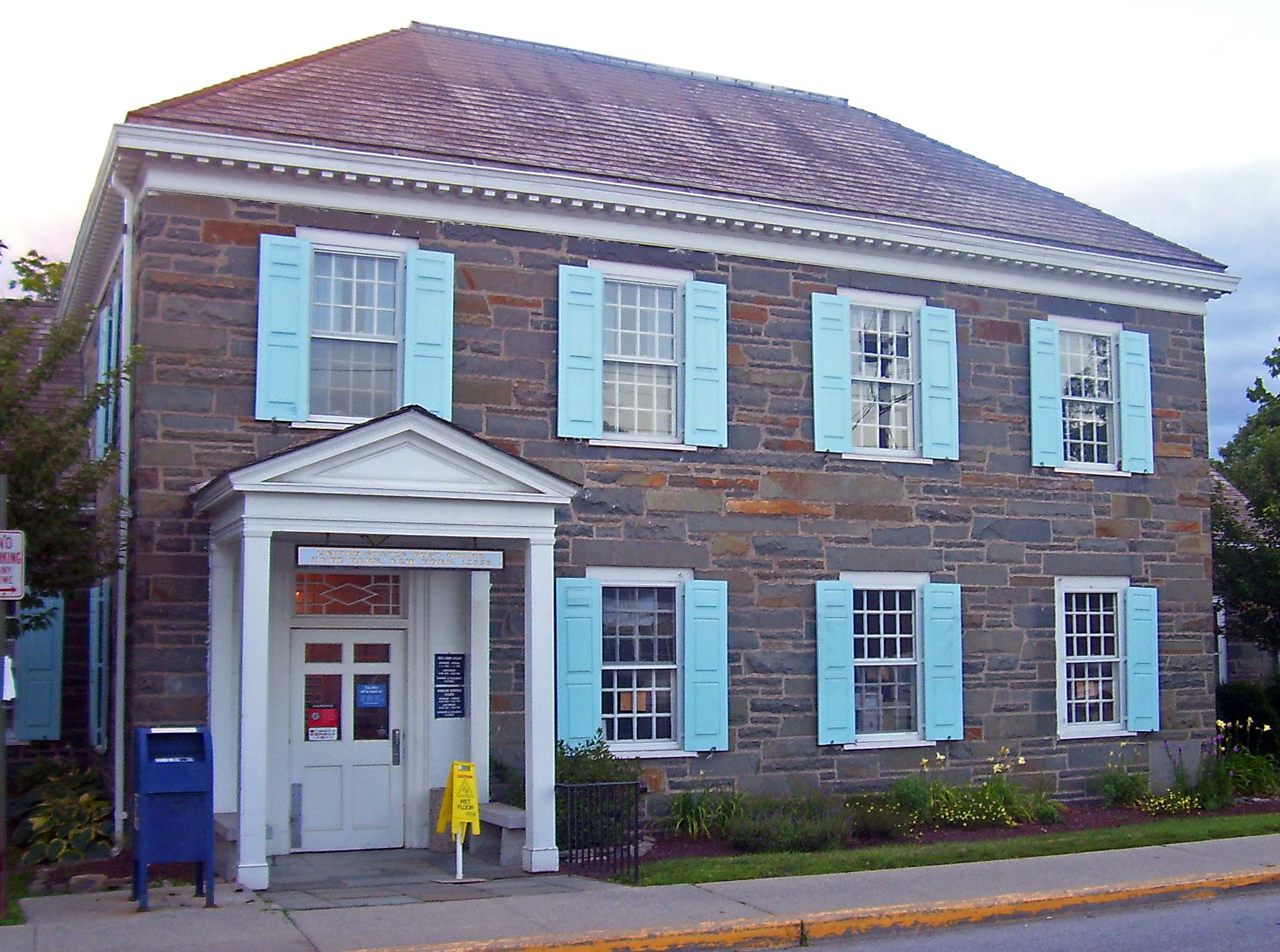
- Building in 2007, with one shutter missing

- Location within New York Location within the United States
- Location: Hyde Park, NY
- Nearest city: Poughkeepsie
- Coordinates: 41°47′30″N 73°56′11″W
- Built: 1941
- Architect: Rudolph Stanley-Brown
- Architectural style: Dutch Colonial Revival
- MPS: US Post Offices in New York State, 1858–1943, TR
- NRHP reference No.: 88002511
- Added to NRHP: 1988

The U.S. Post Office in Hyde Park, New York, serves the 12538 ZIP Code. It is a stone building in the Dutch Colonial Revival architectural style, located on East Market Street (Dutchess County Route 41) just east of US 9.

It is a stone building modeled on an early house in the region. President Franklin D. Roosevelt, a native of Hyde Park, took a personal interest in the construction of the new building during the New Deal. A series of murals inside depict major events in local history. In 1988 it was listed on the National Register of Historic Places.

== Building ==
The post office is located in the center of Hyde Park, on a corner lot at the intersection. Hyde Park Reformed Dutch Church is to the north; St. James Chapel is across East Market to the southeast. A decorative stone wellhead sits to the west, near the actual corner.

Its front facade, four bays wide, faces south. The two-story main block is faced in fieldstone in a random ashlar pattern. Windows have louvered shutters It is topped with a hipped roof with boxed wooden cornice and plain modillions. The main entrance, in the western bay, has a small pedimented wooden porch with square piers.

Two 1 1/2-story wings, on the east and west, have gabled roofs with clapboard siding in the gable ends. The cornices are shallower. The west wing has an entrance with paneled reveal and transom light. A larger, later wing extends from the north, of brick in common bond with a gambrel roof and cornice echoing the main roof. It ends in a loading platform.

Inside, the lobby has a flagstone floor and wainscoting. Around the upper wall on three sides are murals of Hyde Park's history. Much of the woodworking and finishes are original. A small display case holds the trowel used by Roosevelt at the groundbreaking ceremony.

== History ==
The post office as an institution is of local historic importance. Hyde Park takes its name from its first post office, located in the Hyde Park Inn. The settlement's name was originally Stoutenburgh, but the new name took on wide use and eventually became official in 1812. Nine years later the town was separately organized under that name.

A century and a half later, Franklin D. Roosevelt took it upon himself as president to promote the use of the Dutch Colonial Revival style, and fieldstone, for new institutional buildings in his native Hudson Valley. He had personally made sure that new post offices in Poughkeepsie and later Rhinebeck, to the south and north, were built that way. Postmaster General James Farley asked him if he wanted to address Hyde Park's needs next, but the president told him to get Rhinebeck's post office built first since it had the greater need.

In his speech at the 1939 groundbreaking for the Rhinebeck post office, he jokingly warned Farley and Treasury Secretary Henry Morgenthau Jr. that they would not keep their jobs unless they made sure that there would be federal money available to build a new post office in Hyde Park. Rudolph Stanley-Mills, a former Treasury architect by then in private practice, was chosen to design a building for Roosevelt's ultimate approval, due to his successful work on Rhinebeck, Wappingers Falls and other stone post offices in the region.

The Hyde Park site was chosen and purchased in April 1940 for a cost of $15,000 ($345,000 in contemporary dollars). Three houses were removed and demolished to clear a site for the new building. The President personally chose the 1772 clapboard house built (but by then demolished) for early settler John Bard as the model for the structure; the President insisted on stone even though Bard's house had been frame. Stones, larger and more regular in size and shape than those used on the previous four stone post offices in the county, were procured from old stone walls on a farm once owned by Bard's son Samuel.

The brick rear wing was added in 1963 and some modern light fixtures have been installed; other than that the building is as it was when opened.

== Public art ==
Local artist Olin Dows painted murals in the lobby depicting Hyde Park's history, from Henry Hudson's Halve Maen docking in the nearby Hudson River during his 1609 voyage, to Britain's King George VI visiting Roosevelt at his house the year before. He had previously painted similar scenes in the Rhinebeck post office.

Public art in the building caused a local controversy in 2001. The postmaster had instituted a local "Artist of the Month" program which, in October of that year, featured Fatgirl, a painting of the clothed torso and midsection of an obese woman by Audrey Martin. After the post office received several verbal complaints, and one written, it was removed from the building. Protests of censorship from the local arts community drew nationwide sympathy and support, but the Postal Service defended its decision on the grounds that it is not an art gallery, and ended the program.
