= Old Wappingers Falls Village Hall =

- US Post Office-Wappingers Falls (now Wappingers Falls Police Department)
- U.S. National Register of Historic Places
- U.S. Historic district – Contributing property
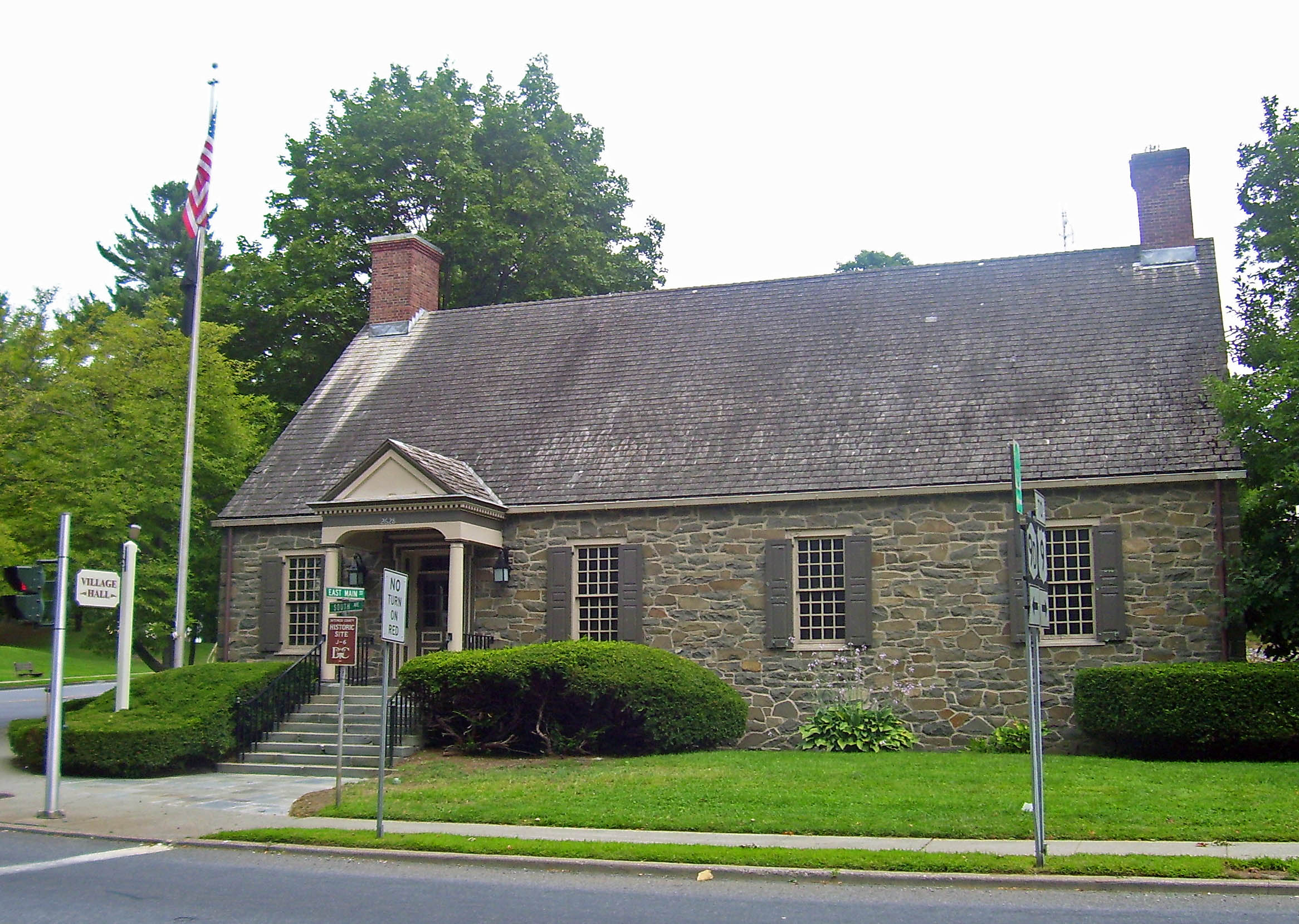
- Building in 2007

- Location within New York Location within the United States
- Location: 2 South Ave., Wappingers Falls, NY
- Nearest city: Poughkeepsie
- Coordinates: 41°35′49″N 73°55′05″W
- Area: less than one acre
- Built: 1940
- Architect: R. Stanley Brown
- Architectural style: Colonial Revival
- Part of: Wappingers Falls Historic District; US Post Offices in New York State, 1858-1943, TR (ID84002380)
- MPS: US Post Offices in New York State, 1858-1943, TR
- NRHP reference No.: 88002440
- Added to NRHP: May 11, 1989

Formerly the Wappingers Falls Village Hall this building now houses the Police Department. It is located at the corner of South Avenue (NY 9D) and East Main Street in the village of Wappingers Falls, Dutchess County, New York.

== History ==
It was originally built in 1940 as the village's new post office, a Works Progress Administration project. President Franklin D. Roosevelt took a personal interest in the project, as he already had with new post offices in other Dutchess County communities. He wanted it to be built of fieldstone in the style of many Dutch colonial houses in the Hudson Valley, and chose the Brewer-Mesier House in the village as the model for its design. R. Stanley Miller, a local architect who had already designed the similar Rhinebeck post office, was assigned the job.

In 1989, the building was listed on the National Register of Historic Places. It had already been a contributing property to the Wappingers Falls Historic District, added to the Register five years earlier. The U.S. Postal Service has since had to move to a larger building a few blocks away on East Main. The village moved most of its functions here and built a new wing — clapboard, not stone, but otherwise consistent with the original design — on the rear of the building to house its police department.

== Murals ==
The former post office, now serving as a police station, houses two murals by Henry Billings, commissioned by the Treasury Section of Fine Arts. These murals depict different views of the town's waterfall, capturing distinct moments in time. The building's proximity to the actual waterfall makes it conveniently accessible. The murals are painted on chestnut panels and occupy the triangular space created by the pitched ceiling of the building. Positioned at opposite ends of the structure, the two views face each other. The 1780 mural draws inspiration from the diary of the Marquis de Chastellux, featuring a conversation between the Marquis and Peter Mesier, whose house served as the model for the post office building. The 1880 scene depicts the falls during their heyday as a significant source of industrial water power, drawing from an old painting.

== See also ==
- Wappingers Falls Historic District

Other area post office buildings whose design Roosevelt influenced:

- U.S. Post Office (Beacon, New York)
- U.S. Post Office (Ellenville, New York)
- U.S. Post Office (Hyde Park, New York)
- U.S. Post Office (Poughkeepsie, New York)
- U.S. Post Office (Rhinebeck, New York)
