= Francis J. Mulhern =

American academic

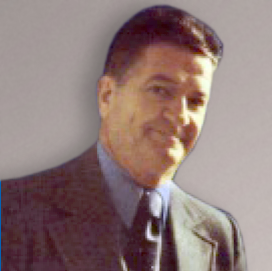

Frank Mulhern is an American academic who is Associate Dean of Research at the Medill School of Journalism at Northwestern University. Mulhern specializes in research on marketing communications, marketing research and database analysis and the role of employees in marketing strategy. He has published papers on retail pricing and promotions, the effectiveness of coupons, and the purchase behavior of ethnic consumer groups. More recent research involves analysis of the role of employees in brand strategy and the integration of internal communications with traditional and interactive media. His research papers have appeared in numerous scholarly journals including the Journal of Marketing, Journal of Retailing, Journal of Advertising, International Journal of Research in Marketing, Journal of Interactive Marketing and Journal of Business Research. Mulhern is the editor of the Promotion Marketing Academic Quarterly, a publication of the Promotion Marketing Association. He is the co-author of the textbook, Marketing Communications: Integrated Theory, Strategy and Tactics. Mulhern also serves as Director of the Forum for People Performance Management and Measurement, a center for scholarly research on employee engagement and internal marketing.

Mulhern has taught courses in the IMC program including Marketing Management, Marketing Communications, Sales Promotion, Database Marketing, Marketing Measurement and Statistics. He also teaches communication with the Marketplace in the Master of Science in communication, Managerial Program at the School of Communications at Northwestern.. Mulhern was previously on the faculty at the College of Business Administration at Pennsylvania State University. He earned his Ph.D. in marketing at the University of Texas at Austin.

== Books ==
- Marketing Communications: Integrated Theory, Strategy and Tactics; Pentagram Pub. (January 1, 2002)
