= Mulhern House =

Historic house in New York, United States

- U.S. National Register of Historic Places
- Location within New York Location within the United States
- Location: 14-16 Market St., Wappingers Falls, New York
- Coordinates: 41°35′57″N 73°55′16″W
- Area: less than one acre
- Built: 1815
- Architectural style: Federal
- MPS: Wappingers Falls MRA
- NRHP reference No.: 84002376
- Added to NRHP: September 29, 1984

Mulhern House was an historic home located at Wappingers Falls in Dutchess County, New York. It was built about 1815 and was a two-story, frame double residence. Also on the property was a contributing shed. It is the only workers' residence that survived intact from the initial period of industrial development at Wappingers Falls. The building was destroyed in a gas explosion in February 1994. A residential building was subsequently constructed on the property at the end of Market St. where it intersects with Franklin and Fulton Streets.

It was added to the National Register of Historic Places in 1987.
