= Wappingers Falls Historic District =

Historic district in New York, US

- U.S. National Register of Historic Places
- U.S. Historic district
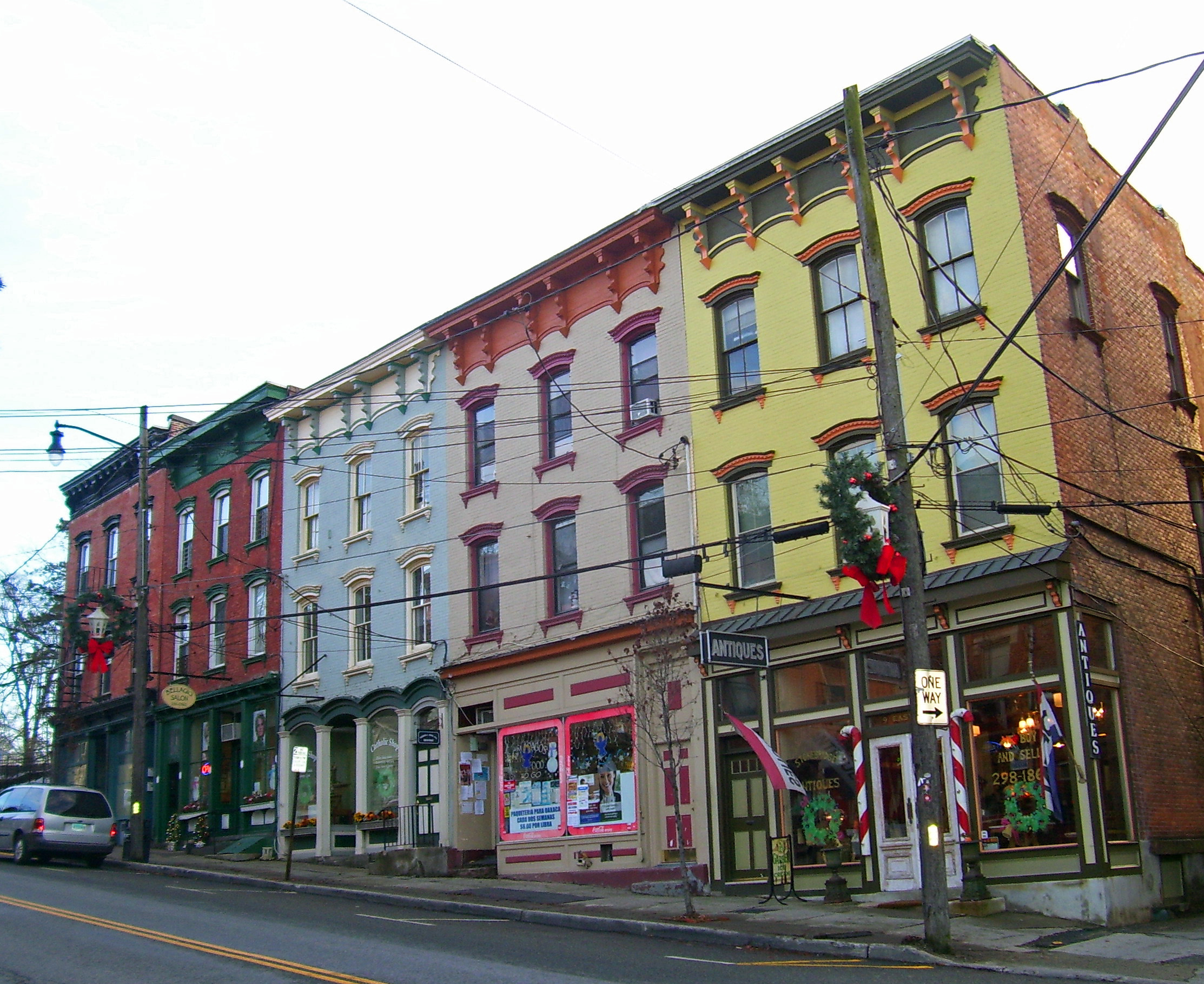
- Civil War-era rowhouses on east side of Main, 2007

- Location within New York Location within the United States
- Location: Wappingers Falls, NY
- Nearest city: Poughkeepsie
- Coordinates: 41°35′53″N 73°55′07″W
- Area: 90 acres (36 ha)
- Built: mid 18th-mid 20th century
- Architectural style: Late Victorian
- MPS: Wappingers Falls MRA
- NRHP reference No.: 84002380
- Added to NRHP: 1984

The Wappingers Falls Historic District is in the center of that village in Dutchess County, New York, United States. It is a 90-acre (36 ha) area roughly centered along South Avenue and West Main Street, NY 9D and Wappinger Creek. It includes Mesier Park in the center of the village and many adjacent residential neighborhoods, roughly bounded by Elm, Park, Walker, Market and McKinley streets.

Much of the district was built in the wake of the industrialization of Wappingers Falls in the 19th century, and its styles represent a cross-section of that century. However, the contributing properties include older buildings, like the ca. 1740 Mesier-Brewer House, and newer ones like the Village Hall, formerly a post office designed under the supervision of Franklin D. Roosevelt during his presidency.

== History ==
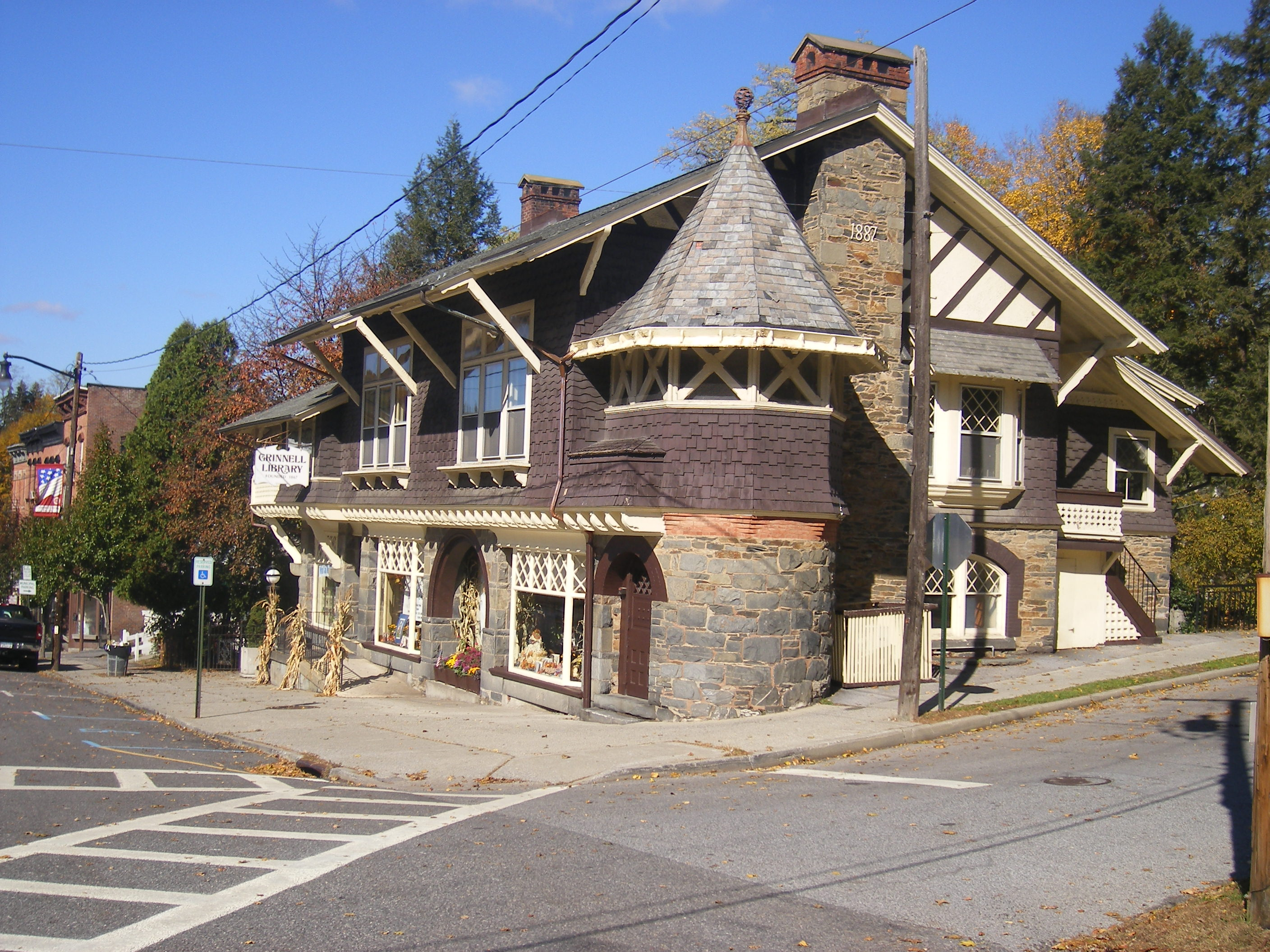
Grinnell Library

In 1819 a small cotton mill was built in the hollow created by the creek as it descends from Lake Wappinger to drain into the nearby Hudson River. By 1856 it had become one of the largest printworks in the country. A fire that year destroyed the original buildings completely, but they were immediately rebuilt and continued in operation until 1931. The streets on the hillside opposite the mill are lined with frame houses, mostly duplexes, built by the mill for its workers. The two halves of the district, and the village, are connected by an 1884 stone arch bridge that replaced earlier wooden structures.

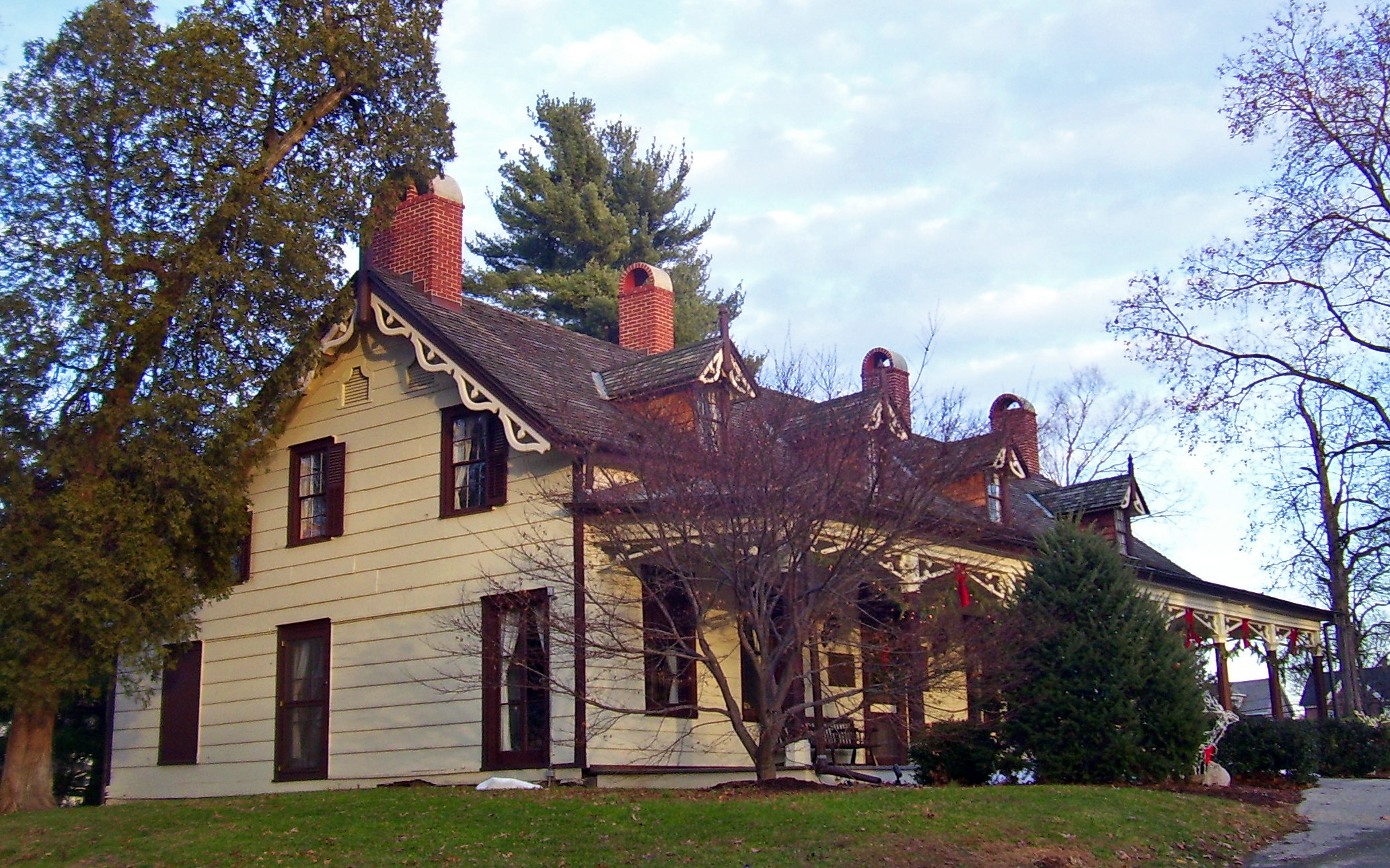
The Mesier-Brewer House

The village's business district, along Main Street north and south of the creek, is lined with three-story Italianate row buildings dating to the years after the Civil War. The residential streets to the southwest are filled with larger houses in a variety of 19th-century styles, from Greek and Gothic Revival to Second Empire and Queen Anne.

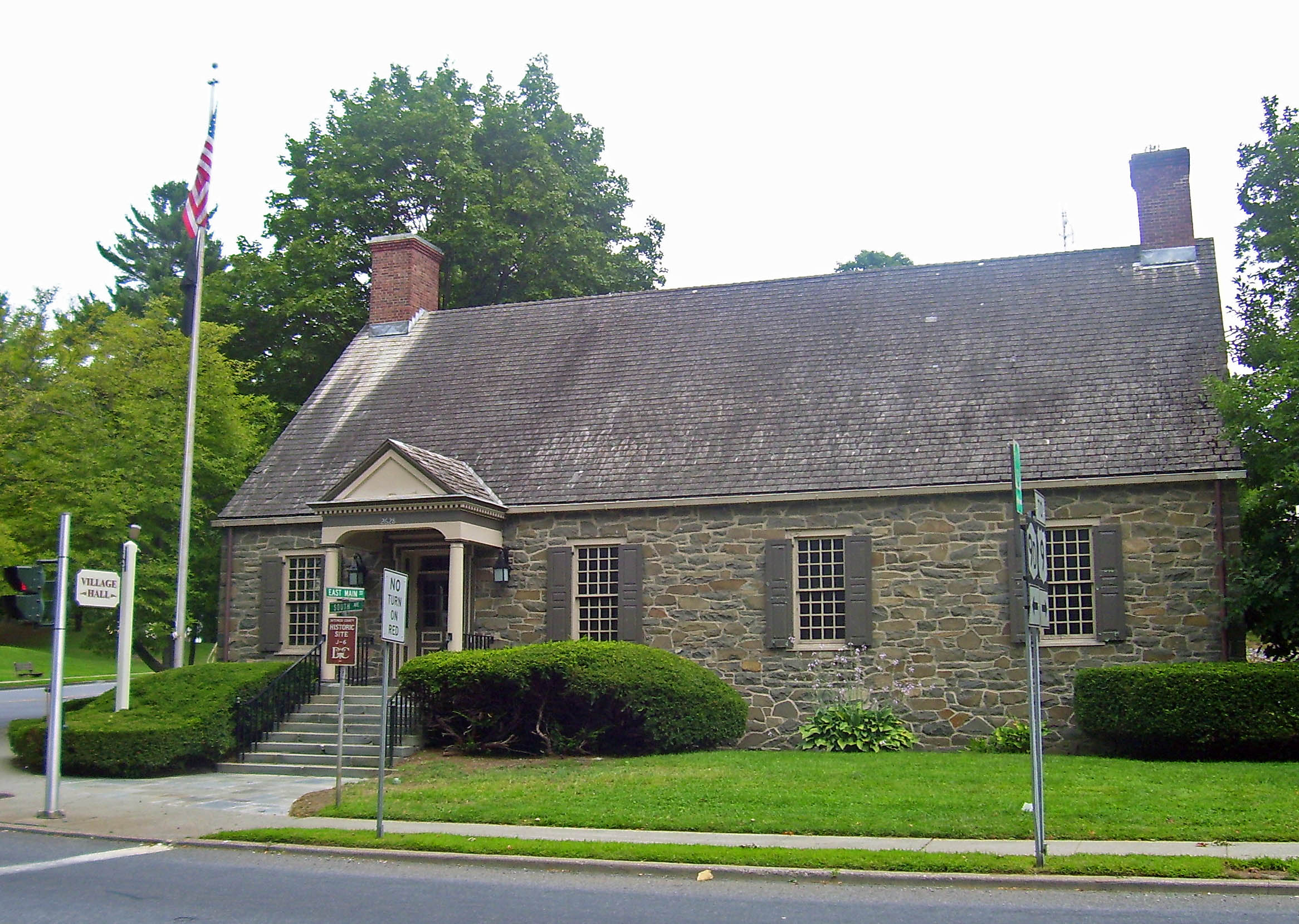
The village police station, formerly its post office.

Two significant contributing properties separately listed in the Register date to the pre- and post-industrial eras. The Mesier-Brewer House in the center of the village is a well-preserved pre-Revolutionary stone and wood home common in the region. Across from it at the junction of East Main Street and South Avenue is the fieldstone police station. It was originally built as one of five post offices in the county designed in stone at the insistence of Roosevelt, a native of nearby Hyde Park. In the late 20th century a new post office was built several blocks to the east and in 1995 the village moved its operations there from the American Legion Hall on Spring Street. The police, who had been working from the Mesier House, joined them.

In 1984 the district was added to the National Register of Historic Places. It is described as a "collection of distinct nineteenth-century structures linked to the development of an important Hudson Valley industrial center."

== Buildings Lost ==
=== Goring Hall ===
Edward M. Goring was born in Manchester, England, April 20, 1828, the son of John M. and Martha Heald Goring. Edward M. Goring, was only eight years of age when his parents left England; he attended the district school at Wappingers Falls, and in 1845 apprenticed to the trade of engraving to calico printing, which he followed from 1845 to 1860. For the succeeding nine years he was engaged in the coal business, and in 1869 he was a member of the firm of Disbrow & Goring, iron founders. He was supervisor for the Town of Fishkill, a member of the New York Assembly, and president of the village in 1879. In 1883 he was appointed, by President Arthur, postmaster at Wappingers Falls. Mr. Goring was a trustee of the Grinnell Library for thirty years. He was actively involved in a number of local enterprises including: the creating of the town of Wappinger from the town of Fishkill; the incorporations of Wappingers Savings Bank, and Bank of Wappingers respectively; the incorporation of Wappingers Falls as a village; and in the laying out of the new road to New Hamburg as a public, instead of a toll road, as chartered by the Legislature. “In all these responsible and honorable positions, he has acquitted himself with credit to himself, and for the best interests of the public.”

In 1872 Goring Hall was built and opened as a drug and stationery store. For over twenty years, Goring Hall was the site of the Falls Coffee Shop, operated by the late Mary Ross, former mayor of the village (2001-2003). Ross and her staff were noted for supplying the volunteer firemen with coffee during responses to fire calls. Goring Hall was demolished in early December 2012, after a partial wall collapse on November 22, 2012, early Thanksgiving morning.

=== Mulhern House ===
Mulhern House was an historic home located at the end of Market Street. It was built about 1815 as a workers' residence that survived intact from the initial period of industrial development in Wappingers Falls. It was added to the National Register of Historic Places in 1987. The building was destroyed in a gas explosion in February 1994.

=== Sweet Orr Factory ===
Clayton E. Sweet, was born at Wappingers Falls, N. Y., June 16, 1834. His father was for many years a merchant and manufacturer in Wappingers Falls, and for a period postmaster of the village. Mr. Sweet was educated at the public schools of his native place and at the Dutchess County Academy at Poughkeepsie. Then for three years he was in the employ of Levi Cook & Co., merchants on Broadway, New York. He returned to Wappinger's Falls to enter his father's store, was made a partner. For many years. Mr. Sweet was one of the leading business men of the place and of great usefulness to the community. He was one of the first trustees of the Wappingers Savings Bank, and acted as its secretary and treasurer until it obtained a substantial footing; he was afterwards elected vice president of the institution. For seven years he was postmaster of the village under President Grant. He was also a director of the Fallkill National Bank of Poughkeepsie, and a vestryman of the Zion Episcopal Church of Wappingers Falls.

The firm of Sweet, Orr & Co., were pioneers in the manufacture of overalls. After a large business experience in the Village of Wappingers Falls, he moved to Newburgh in 1887, to which city the business offices of the company were changed that year.

Sweet Orr set up a factory building on Mill Street in the late 1800s. The company manufactured denim overalls and jeans sold all over the country. The building burned down in the 1990s and is now the site of one of the village's parking lots.
