= Wards of New York City =

Former subdivisions of New York City

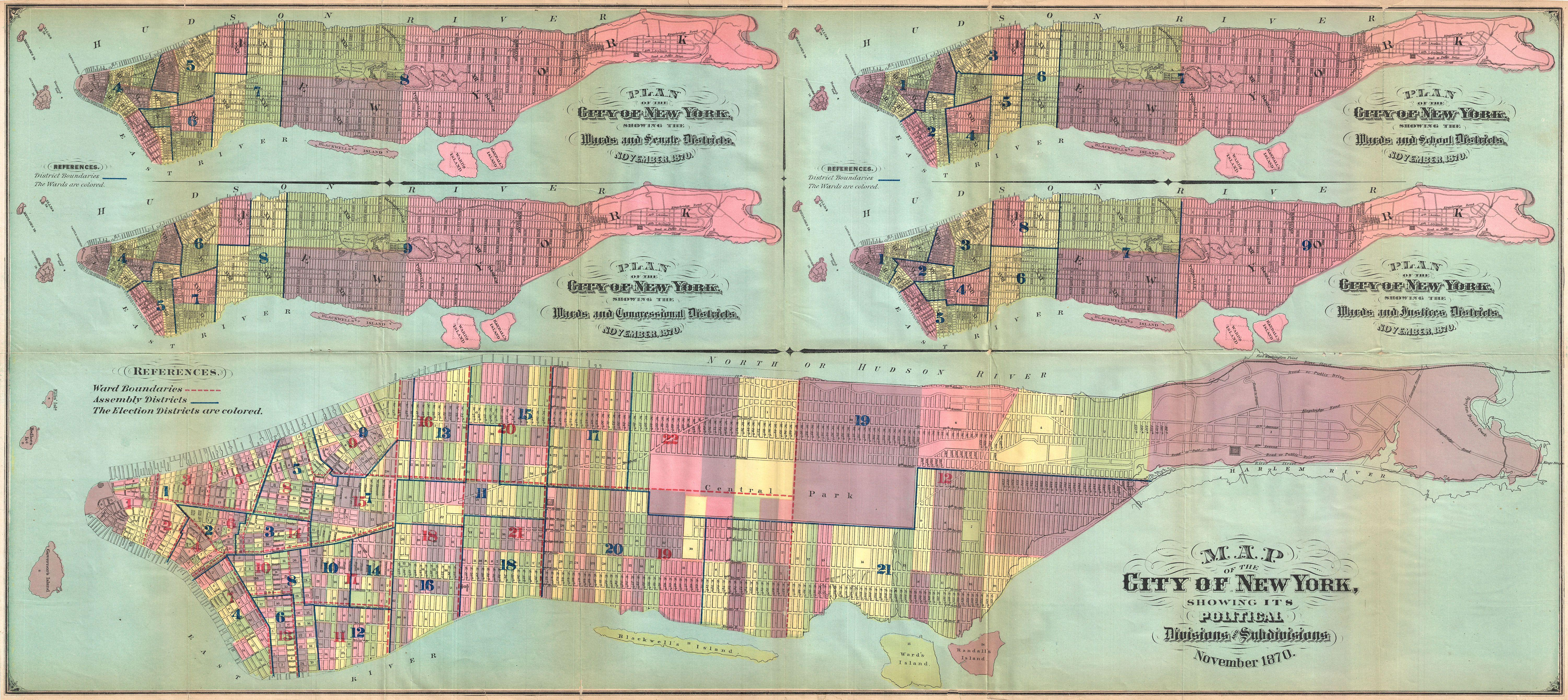
1870 Hardy Map of New York City.

New York City was divided into wards between 1683 and 1938. These were used for the election of various municipal offices, and would later be used to construct the boundaries of larger electoral districts. Prior to the formation of the so-called City of Greater New York in 1898, what is now New York City comprised multiple municipalities that had different histories with wards.

== Manhattan and the Bronx ==
The wards established on December 8, 1683. The Out Ward covered the rest of Manhattan. The pink line is the modern shoreline.

Six wards were established for New York City, which at the time comprised Manhattan and minor outlying islands, on December 8, 1683. Of these, five of the wards were located in what is now the Financial District of Lower Manhattan, while the Out Ward covered the rest of Manhattan. The wards were authorized to elect one alderman and one councilman each. The Dongan Charter of 1686 confirmed these wards, and granted them the ability to elect one alderman, one assistant, and one constable each; the Out Ward was divided into divisions which each elected one constable. The Montgomerie Charter of 1731 added a "Montgomerie Ward" to the north of the West Ward. The wards became numbered in 1791.

In 1824 wards elected one member of the Board of Aldermen and two members of the Board of Assistants each, with aldermen elected for staggered two-year terms and assistants elected for one-year terms. By 1872 this was no longer the case; instead 15 aldermen were elected at-large and assistants were elected from each Assembly district.

What is now the West Bronx was annexed by New York City from Westchester County in 1874. It comprised the 23rd and 24th wards of the city; when the East Bronx was annexed in 1895 it was also incorporated into those wards.

== Brooklyn ==
Brooklyn was incorporated as a city in 1837 and divided into nine wards. By 1889 there were 26 wards, which were further used to construct Congressional and Assembly districts. By 1898 Brooklyn contained 32 wards.

== Post-consolidation ==
Upon consolidation in 1898, a new charter was enacted which introduced a bicameral Municipal Assembly with an upper Council and a lower Board of Aldermen. The wards of Brooklyn were used to determine its districts to elect members of the council; other methods were used in the other boroughs. Assembly districts were generally used to elect members of the Board of Aldermen. Wards were used in Richmond (now Staten Island) as of 1903, each ward corresponding to a town in the borough that existed prior to consolidation. Ward politics declined in the early 20th century, and wards were abolished in 1938.

See also

- Community boards of New York City

== Works cited ==
- The Charter of the City of New York, Chapter 378 of the Laws of 1897, With amendments passed in 1898 and 1899, and a complete index, and maps of boroughs. Eagle Building, Brooklyn: Office of Publication. September 1899 – via HathiTrust.
- The Dongan Charter of the City of New York 1686. May 12, 1686 – via HathiTrust.
- Election districts of the several assembly districts (and 23d and 24th wards) of the city and county of New York, and the boundaries thereof, as revised by the Board of Police, June 28th, 1876. New York: John X. Browne. 1876 – via Internet Archive.
- Stone, William L. (1872). History of New York City from the discovery to the present day. New York: Virtue and Yorston – via HathiTrust.
