= Wappingers Falls, New York =

- Village
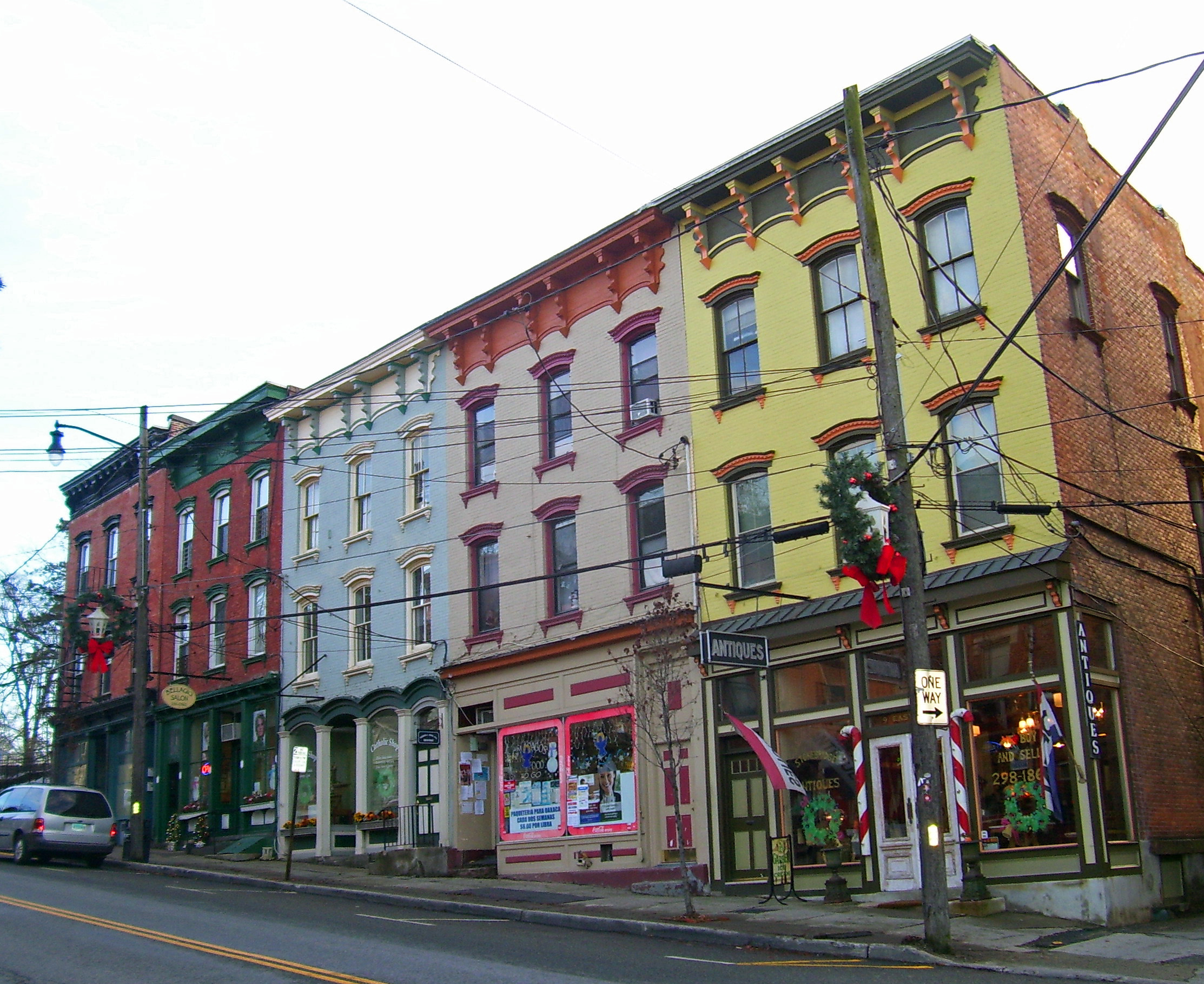
- Downtown Wappingers Falls

- Seal

- Location of Wappingers Falls, New York
- Coordinates: 41°35′57″N 73°55′5″W
- Country: United States
- State: New York
- County: Dutchess
- Towns: Wappinger, Poughkeepsie
- Incorporated: 1871

Area
  - Total: 1.20 sq mi (3.11 km^{2})
  - Land: 1.12 sq mi (2.90 km^{2})
  - Water: 0.077 sq mi (0.20 km^{2})
- Elevation: 154 ft (47 m)

Population (2020)
  - Total: 6,103
  - Density: 5,444.5/sq mi (2,102.14/km^{2})
- Time zone: UTC−5 (Eastern (EST))
  - Summer (DST): UTC−4 (EDT)
- ZIP Code: 12590
- Area code: 845
- FIPS code: 36-78168
- GNIS feature ID: 0968775
- Website: www.wappingersfallsny.gov

Wappingers Falls is a village in the towns of Poughkeepsie and Wappinger, in Dutchess County, New York, United States. As of the 2020 census, Wappingers Falls had a population of 6,103. The community was named for the cascade in Wappinger Creek. The Wappingers Falls post office covers areas in the towns of Wappinger, Poughkeepsie, Fishkill, East Fishkill, and LaGrange. This can result in some confusion when residents of the outlying towns, who do not live in the village, give their address as "Wappingers Falls".

== History ==
Panoramic map of Wappingers Falls from 1889 with list of landmarks by L.R. Burleigh

The Wappinger were an Algonquian-speaking confederacy of Native Americans whose territory in the 17th century extended along the eastern bank of the Hudson River. Primarily based in what is now Dutchess County, their territory was bordered by Manhattan Island to the south, the Mahican territory bounded by the Roeliff Jansen Kill to the north, and extended east into parts of Connecticut. Wappinger means "easterner" in most Algonquian languages.

The area was part of the Rombout Patent. In 1741, two Dutchmen, Nicholas and Adolphus Brewer, purchased 750 acres (300 ha) of land around the falls and built the first stone house in the village near the present Mill Street. In 1742, the Brewers built a mill on the east side of Wappinger Creek. Nicholas Brewer built the Mesier Homestead, which he sold in 1777 to Matthew VanBenschoten, who, in turn, sold it to Peter Mesier Sr., a merchant from New York City.

In May 1777, soldiers and local residents attacked Peter Mesier's house in Wappingers Falls, disputing the price of tea for sale in a small store inside his home. Mesier was a merchant from New York City and a Loyalist. The angry mob struck Mesier, beat his slaves, and drank wine stored in the cellar. They also took the tea and left a small amount of money behind.

The local waterfall was important for early industrial development. In 1819 a small cotton mill was built in the hollow created by the creek as it descends from Wappinger Lake to drain into the Hudson River. By 1856 it had become one of the largest printworks in the country. A fire that year destroyed the original buildings completely, but they were immediately rebuilt and continued in operation until 1931. The streets on the hillside opposite the mill are lined with frame houses, mostly duplexes, built by the mill for its workers. The two halves of the village are connected by an 1884 stone arch bridge that replaced earlier wooden structures.

The village of Wappingers Falls was incorporated in 1871 and included the adjacent community on the west side of the Wappinger Creek, by then called Channingville. The east side was known as Franklindale. In 1885 the Franklindale Cotton Mill, which employed about 130 people, was destroyed by fire. During President Grover Cleveland’s second administration, the Independent Comb Factory on the corner of Fulton and Prospect streets was forced to close. The repeal of the tariff made it impossible for the company to compete with German-made combs. In 1909, the Garner Print Works were sold and became the Dutchess Bleachery. The plant, which at times employed as many as 1,150 people, stopped printing calico but continued as a bleachery and dye works.

In 1987, the Tawana Brawley case, involving allegations of rape and kidnapping took place.

On June 3, 2017, downtown Wappingers Falls had a devastating structure fire that left more than 30 people displaced and six businesses temporarily closed. No one was injured during the fire, which spread through a strip of buildings in the East Main Street corridor on the Saturday afternoon.

=== Channingville ===
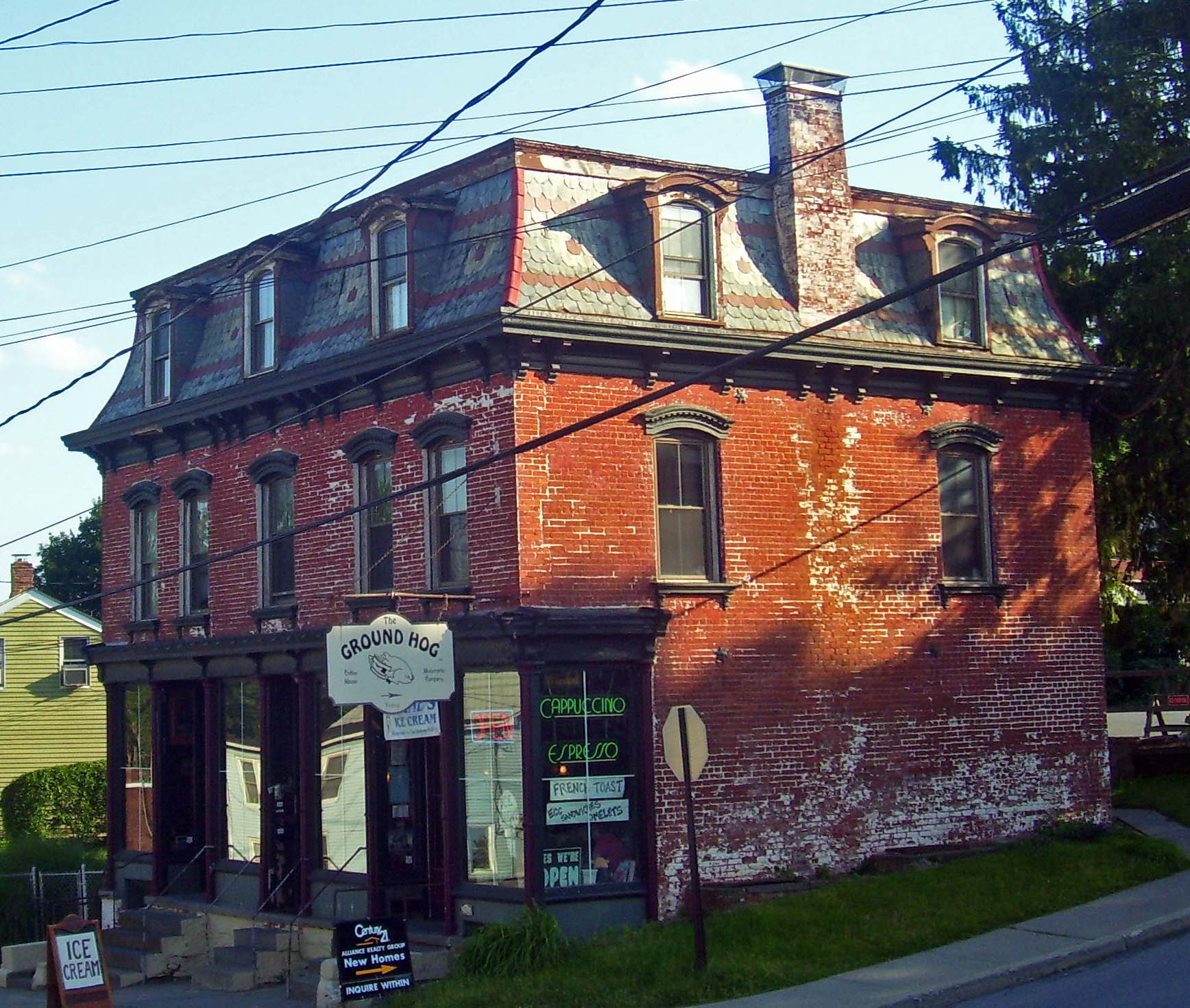
Bain Commercial Building, Wappingers Falls

That portion of the village lying north of the creek, in the town of Poughkeepsie, was originally known as "Ednam". It later became known as Channingville (sometimes rendered "Chiningville"), which name is derived from the Channing family, who owned the farm on which it mostly lies.

The first merchant in this part of the village was a cooper, John Crilley, from Ireland by way of Glenham. In 1842 he built the first brick building erected on either side of the creek. By 1836, Ednam had about thirty dwellings and a cotton factory with 2,400 spindles and 90 looms, making 500,000 yards of cloth per annum.

J.J. O'Riley's North American Hotel and Eagan's Opera House (built in 1876 by John Eagan, with a seating capacity for five hundred people) were located here. The village's first post office was established here in 1840. The post office bore the name of the creek.

The Bain Commercial Building is located at the corner of Church and West Main (NY 9D) streets. The Bain family is believed to have built the building in 1875, shortly after Channingville became part of the village. It was both their residence and their place of business. It is a late 19th-century brick building that was listed on the National Register of Historic Places in 1984.

== Historic places ==
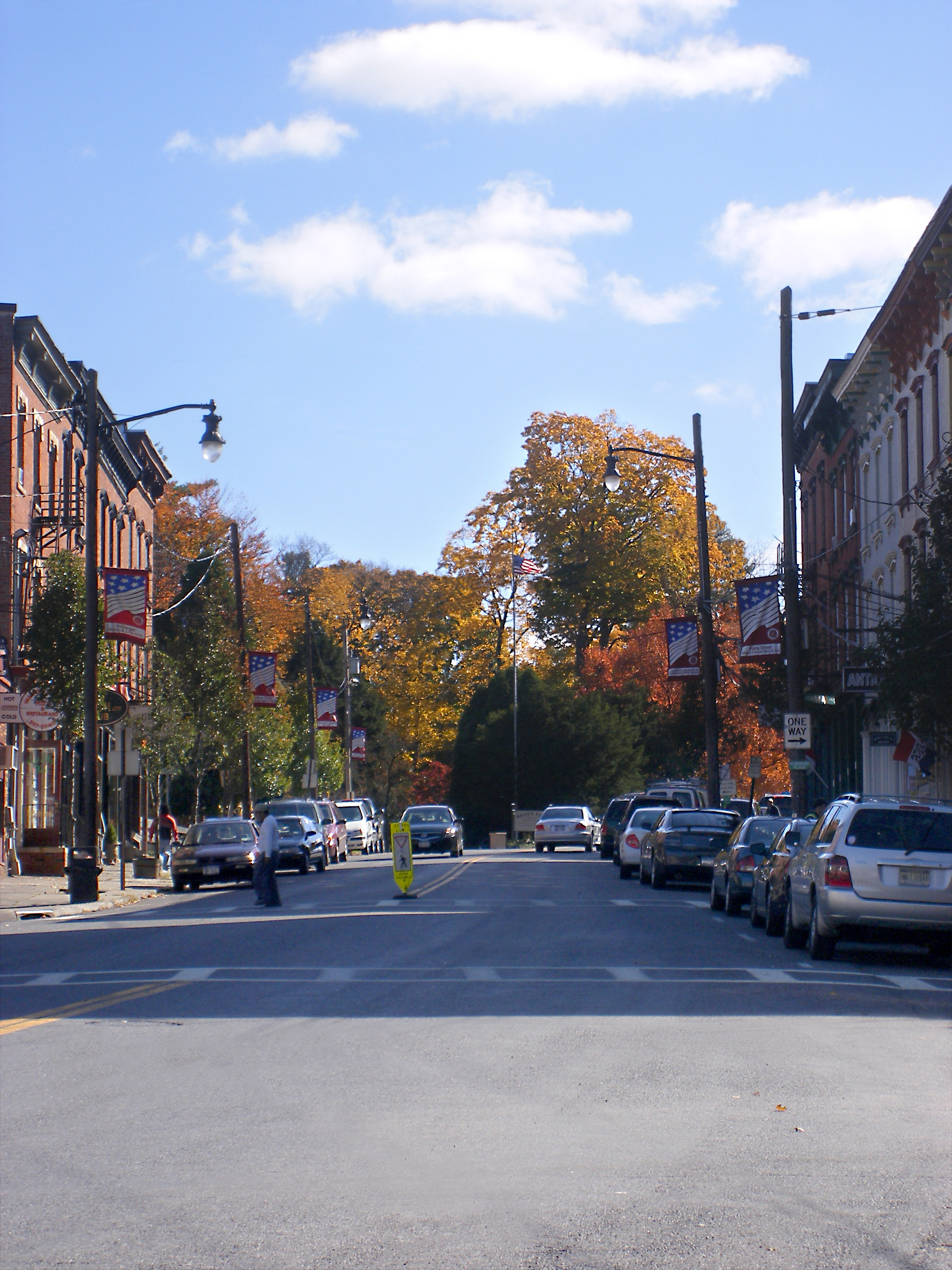
Downtown Wappingers Falls

The Wappingers Falls Historic District includes downtown, several adjacent residential neighborhoods, and Mesier Park & Homestead. Mesier Park has been a public park since ca. 1891, and hosts many annual events that focus around the bandstand and tree-lined paths of the park. In 1984 the district was added to the National Register of Historic Places.

The Dutchess Company Superintendent's House is located on Market Street in the western corner of the village. It is a large brick residence that was built as housing for the manager of the Dutchess Company, a large local printing works, shortly after the plant was built in 1848. It remained in company ownership until the company failed in the 20th century. In 1984 it was added to the National Register of Historic Places.

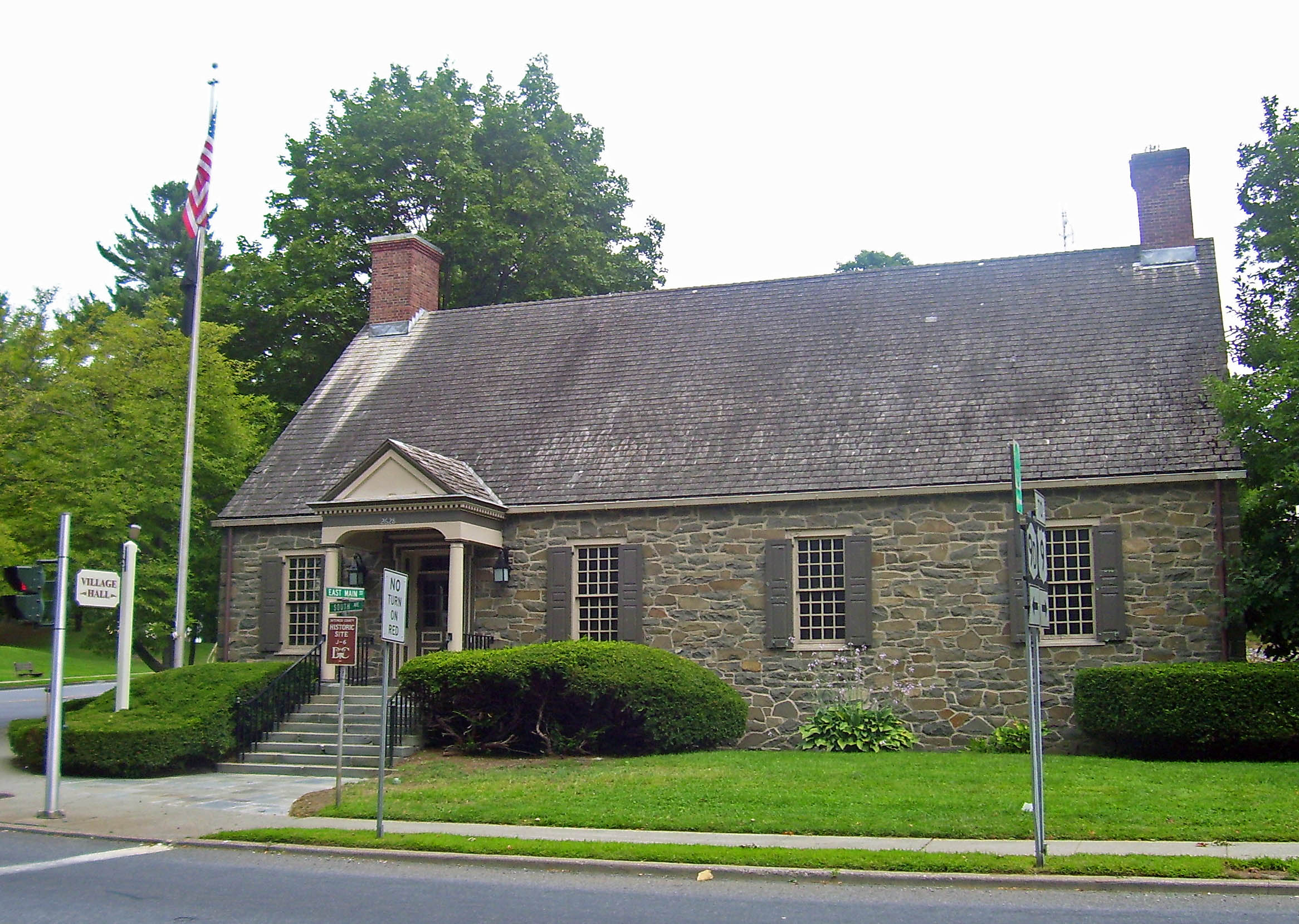
Police Station, former post office listed on the NRHP

The Police Station is located at the corner of South Avenue (NY 9D) and East Main Street. It was originally built in 1940 as the village's new post office, a WPA project. President Franklin D. Roosevelt took a personal interest in the project, as he had with other new post offices in Dutchess County. He wanted it to be built of fieldstone in the style of many Dutch colonial houses in the area, and chose the Brewer-Mesier House in the village as the model for its design. The old post office contains two Treasury Section of Fine Arts murals by Henry Billings. The paintings show two views of the town's waterfall at different points in time, one from 1780 and the other from 1880, facing each other from opposite ends of the small building.

== Places of worship ==
=== Zion Episcopal Church ===
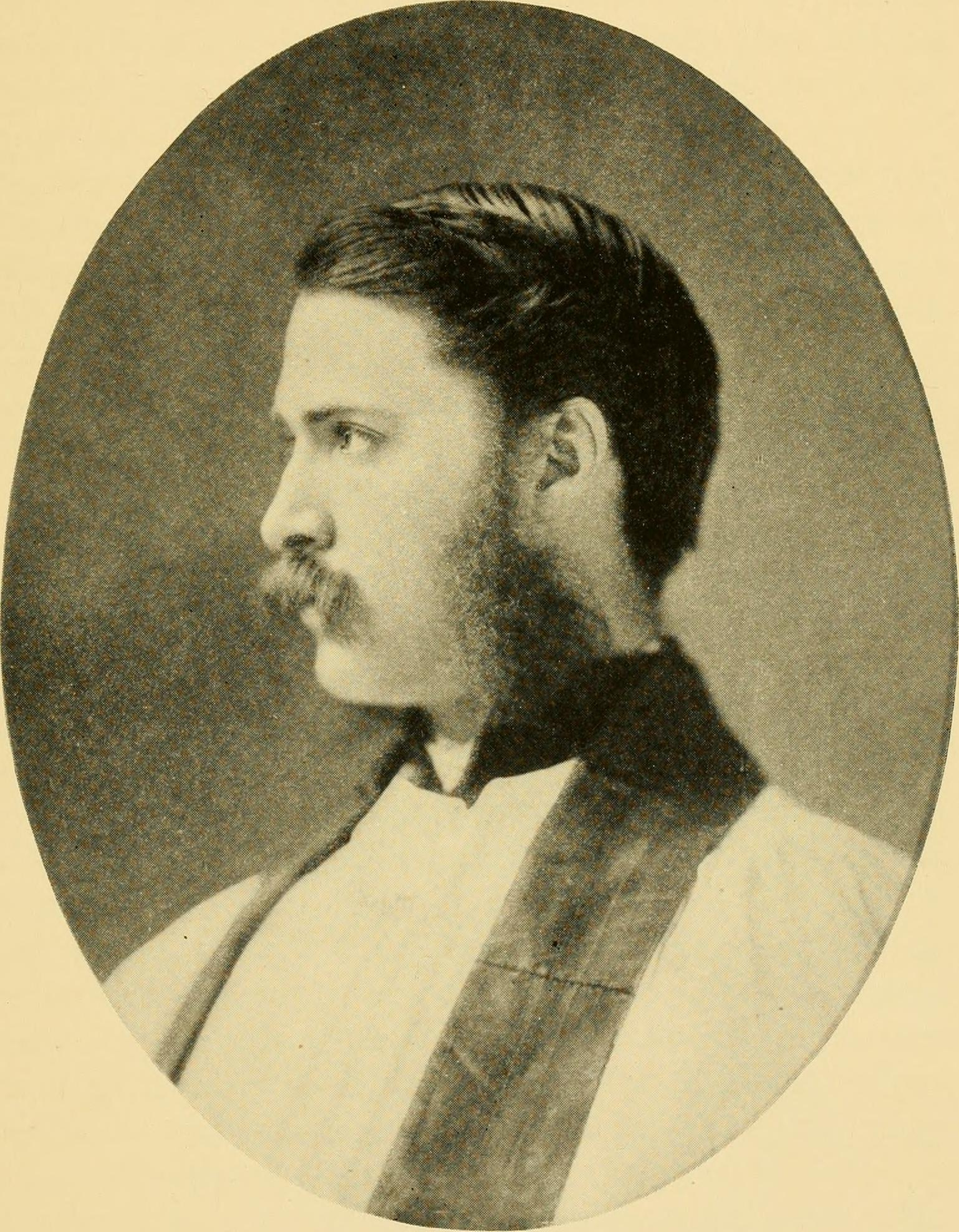
Henry Yates Satterlee

Zion Episcopal Church began in 1820 under the shade of an apple tree when Joanna Mesier, wife of Matthew Mesier, began a Sunday school. There were only seven or eight families living in the area at the time. The class was subsequently moved to a corn barn near the Mesier homestead where the village flagpole now stands. The Mesiers attended Trinity Church in Fishkill, the nearest Episcopal church, but felt the need for a church less distant for the farmers of the area and their families. In 1833, the Reverend Doctor George B. Andrews moved to a farm, "Highmount", between Hughsonville and New Hamburg. On July 14 of that year he conducted the first official service of the Episcopal Church somewhere on the north side of Wappingers Creek. He continued to be driven up from his farm with his family and servants to spend Sundays near the falls. In December 1833, Matthew Mesier gave a small tract of land between the burial ground and the turnpike (now Main Street) in front of what was then Mr. Givens' place. One month later plans were made to construct a church. The stone for the church came from the property of Benjamin Clapp, much of which he hauled himself. Zion Protestant Episcopal Church was dedicated by Bishop Onderdonk on May 6, 1836. Mr. Andrews served as pastor, not only to the church in Wappingers, but often found time to row across the Hudson to conduct services in Marlboro. The church's most notable pastor was Henry Yates Satterlee, assistant rector 1865-75 and senior rector 1875–83, who was elected the first bishop of the Washington Diocese in 1896 and there established the Cathedral Church of Saint Peter and Saint Paul, popularly known as Washington National Cathedral.

=== Bethel Missionary Baptist Church ===
The Franklindale Baptist Church was organized in 1838. Benjamin Clapp, former warden of Zion Episcopal, converted to the Baptist faith and donated land on the corner of Prospect Street and South Avenue. The church building was dedicated on December 5, 1847. In 1967 the Bethel Baptist community purchased Franklindale Baptist, which was dedicated as Bethel Missionary Baptist Church on October 15, 1967. In 1997 the need for additional space brought the purchase of the house across Prospect Street, which had belonged to Dr. Kerrigan. Referred to as "Bethel Annex", the 1830s building provided space for the church school and events. In the mid-2000s, the Kerrigan House was sold and transported across South Avenue to be replaced by a new church building.

=== First Presbyterian Church ===
The Presbyterian Church at Wappingers Falls owed it existence to Mrs. John Fisher Sheafe, whose country seat was near New Hamburg. She asked the Rev. John D. Wells, who was then preaching at Ellessdie Chapel, situated two miles north of New Hamburg on the river road, to see if there was a need for a church in Wappingers. This resulted in the organization of the Presbyterian Society in 1848, and the same year a church edifice and parsonage were built by Mrs. Sheafe on Fulton Street. During the pastorate of Rev. O.A. Kingsbury (1879-1883) the Fulton Street property was sold and the present brick structure on South Avenue erected. The new church was dedicated July 23, 1872. The church lasted for just over 150 years before it closed, holding its final service on January 13, 2023.

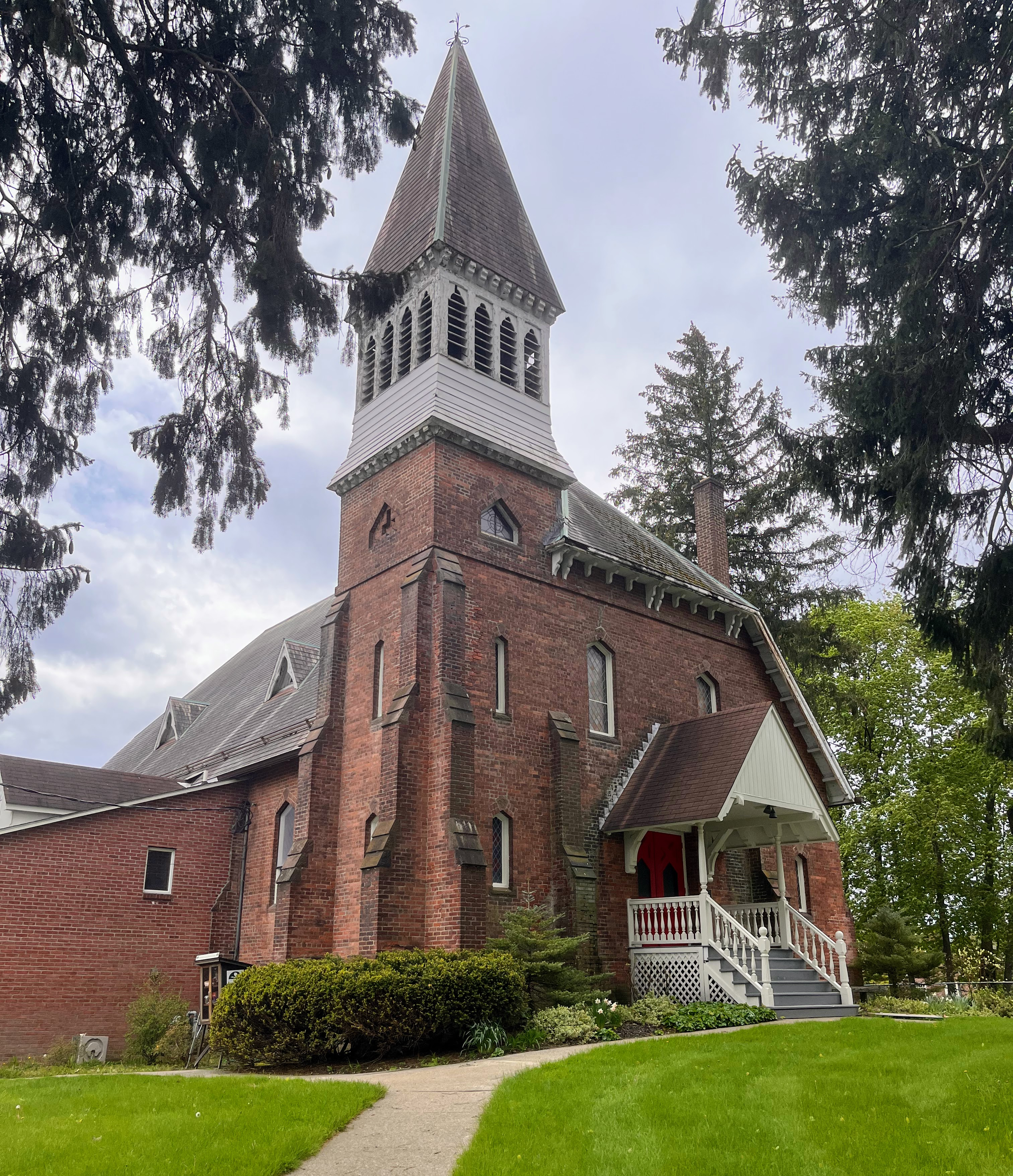
United Methodist Church, designed by George E. Harney

=== United Methodist Church of Wappingers Falls ===
The first Methodist Episcopal Church in the area of Wappingers Falls was started by noted circuit riding preacher Freeborn Garrettson in 1788. By 1824, services were held in the home of Joseph C. Smith at Middlebush, before moving to a schoolhouse. In 1827, the Methodist Society purchased the former Baptist meeting house, also at Middlebush. In 1841 it became part of the Johnsville circuit. John Given donated land in the then village of Ednam, at the falls west of the Wappingers Creek. Ednamville was established as a mission church served by preachers who rode circuit to Middlebush and New Hamburg. In 1845, a church was built at the corner of West Main and Church Streets. In the spring of 1868, with the idea of merging the Wappingers Falls and Middlebush congregations, land was purchased from the estate of Margaret Reese. The old Middlebush church was taken down and the materials used to construct a barn on the new church property on Mesier Avenue. The church was known as the Methodist Episcopal Church until 1939 when the name was changed to The Methodist Church. In 1968, it was changed to the United Methodist Church. In 1974, with the merger with the New Hamburg Methodist Church it became known as The United Methodist Church of Wappingers. In early 2020 the church merged with the Poughkeepsie United Methodist Church and the building was sold.

=== St. Mary's Church ===
Roman Catholics of what is now Wappingers Falls were cared for by priests from St. Peter's Church in Poughkeepsie until 1845 when the parish was founded to serve southern Dutchess County. In 1850, the first pastor took up residence. Masses were offered in local homes until a church was constructed on Clinton Street. The current church building was consecrated in 1879, although the interior has been renovated a number of times, the last being in the early 2000's. The parish also has a cemetery which is still in operation and a school.

=== Mount Alvernia and the Monastery of St. Clare ===
Mount Alvernia Retreat Center sits on 204 acres overlooking the Hudson Valley and is run by the Franciscan Friars of the New York Province of the Immaculate Conception. It was built in 1950 and until 1967 served as a seminary to train Franciscan friars for the Roman Catholic priesthood. Its chapel offers daily Mass while the former seminary building hosts retreats and other events. On the property of the Retreat Center is the Monastery of St. Clare built in 2004 for the Poor Clares, Franciscan nuns who moved to Wappingers Falls from Throgs Neck in the Bronx. The Monastery of St. Clare is located in the village of Wappingers Falls while Mount Alvernia is located just outside the village in the town of Poughkeepsie.

== Geography ==
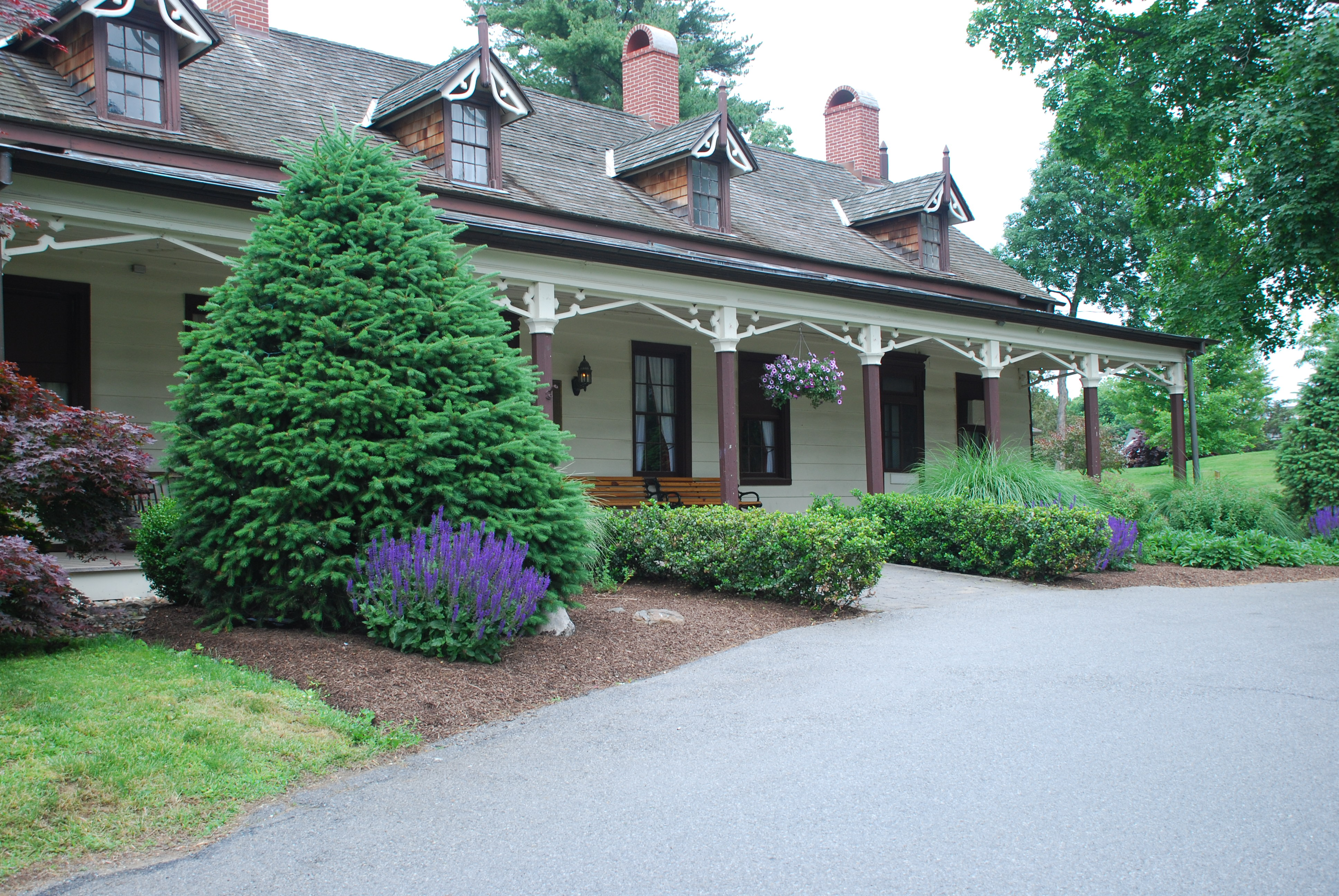
Mesier Homestead

Wappingers Falls is situated at the head of navigation on Wappinger Creek, about 2 miles (3 km) above (northeast of) its confluence with the Hudson River. According to the United States Census Bureau, the village has a total area of 1.2 square miles (3.1 km^{2}), of which 1.1 square miles (2.9 km^{2}) is land and 0.1 square miles (0.2 km^{2}), or 6.45%, is water.

Wappinger Creek flows through the village. The Wappingers Falls post office serves both the village of Wappingers Falls and the town of Wappinger (as well as portions of Fishkill, East Fishkill, Poughkeepsie and LaGrange) under the ZIP code "Wappingers Falls, NY 12590". US 9 passes through the village, as well as NY 9D.

== Demographics ==
Historical population
Census	Pop.	Note	%±
1870	2,263		—
1890	3,718		—
1900	3,504		−5.8%
1910	3,195		−8.8%
1920	3,235		1.3%
1930	3,336		3.1%
1940	3,427		2.7%
1950	3,490		1.8%
1960	4,447		27.4%
1970	5,607		26.1%
1980	5,110		−8.9%
1990	4,605		−9.9%
2000	4,929		7.0%
2010	5,522		12.0%
2020	6,103		10.5%
U.S. Decennial Census

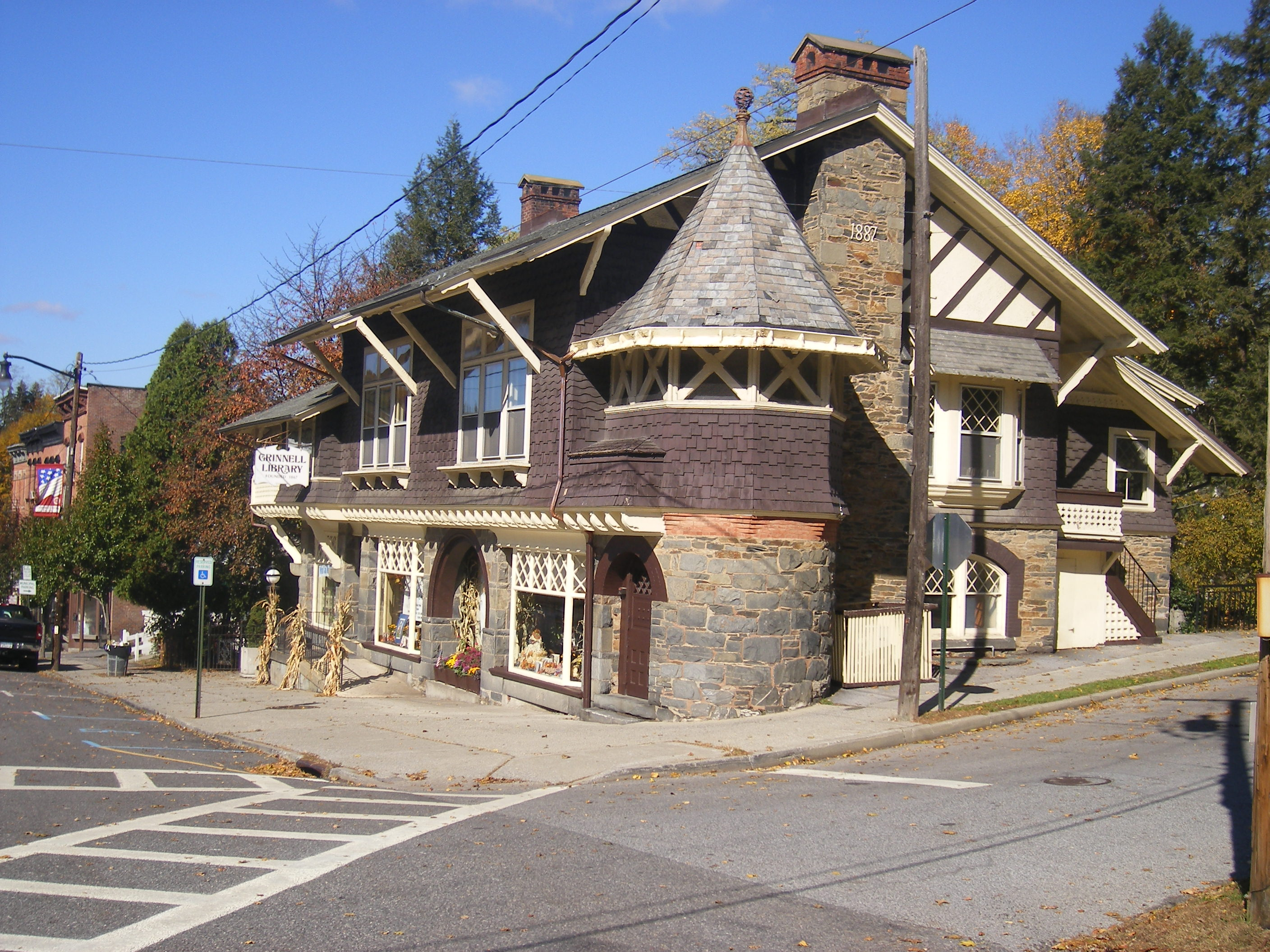
Grinnell Library

As of the 2010 census, the total population of the village was 5,522. The racial makeup of the village was 72.5% white, 7.4% African American, .03% Native American, 4.8% Asian, 10.2% from other races, and 4.9% from two or more races. Hispanic or Latino of any race were 26.2% of the population. The median age was 35.5 years.

The median income for a household in the village was $39,123, and the median income for a family was $50,000. Males had a median income of $38,147 versus $26,607 for females. The per capita income for the village was $20,491. About 10.4% of families and 12.3% of the population were below the poverty line, including 15.1% of those under age 18 and 14.3% of those age 65 or over.

It is part of the Poughkeepsie-Newburgh-Middletown metropolitan area as well as the larger New York metropolitan area.

== Entertainment and the arts ==
County Players Falls Theatre, a volunteer, non-profit community theatre is located on West Main Street in the village, in the former Academy Theatre building.

TV stations (with antenna pointed south) WCBS-TV-2, WNBC-TV-4, WNYW-TV-5, WABC-TV-7, WWOR-TV-9, WPIX-TV-11, WNET-13

TV stations, with antenna pointed north to Albany, include WRGB-TV-6, WTEN-TV-10, WMHT-TV-17 and WCWN-45.

These stations are also delivered by cablevision.

== Education ==
St. Mary Elementary School is a Catholic elementary school of the Roman Catholic Archdiocese of New York in Wappingers Falls that opened in September 1893. It educated students in grades K-8 school and closed in June 2019, at which point it had 118 students. In 2023, the school reopened, educating Pre-K and kindergarten students, along with one all-grade class at the elementary level.

The Village of Wappingers Falls is part of the Wappingers Central School District. The district has no schools located within the village, although James S. Evans Elementary School and Wappingers Junior High School border it.

== Transportation ==
The New Hamburg station on Metro-North Railroad's Hudson Line serves Wappinger's Falls. Stewart International Airport is located just over the Newburgh–Beacon Bridge, and offers domestic and international flights.

== Notable people ==
- Tyler Adams, professional soccer player, USA national soccer team and AFC Bournemouth in the English Premier League
- Dave Bargeron, trombone player for Blood, Sweat and Tears
- Dan Brouthers, baseball player, inducted into the Baseball Hall of Fame.
- Jeh Johnson, 4th United States secretary of homeland security
- Jack Mulhall, silent film actor
- John Regan, bass guitar player
- Frederick W. Rowe, U.S. representative
- Wallace Worsley, actor

== Books ==
- Ward Moore's 1953 alternate history novel Bring the Jubilee is partially set in Wappingers Falls.
