= Notes from the Archive: Recordings 2011–2016 =

Compilation album by Maggie Rogers
- Released: December 18, 2020
- Recorded: 2011–2016
- Genre: Indie folk
- Length: 58:16
- Label: Debay Sounds
- Producer: Dan Drohan; Jeff Fettig; Hrishikesh Hirway; Samuel Holden Jaffe; Pablo Melendez; Maggie Rogers

Maggie Rogers chronology
Heard It in a Past Life (2019)	Notes from the Archive: Recordings 2011–2016 (2020)	Surrender (2022)

Notes from the Archive: Recordings 2011–2016 is the first compilation album by American singer-songwriter Maggie Rogers. It was released digitally by Rogers' imprint Debay Sounds on December 18, 2020, and released on CD and vinyl on April 23, 2021.

The 16-track collection consists of various songs written and recorded before her breakthrough hit "Alaska" was released in 2016. It is split into four parts: her 2016 rock EP, the 2014 demo Blood Ballet, her work with the Del Water Gap, and the 2012 demo The Echo.

== Critical reception ==
Heather Phares, writing for AllMusic, praised the songs from Blood Ballet and Rogers' songwriting but said that "One More Afternoon" and "Together" "sound a little cluttered compared to the compilation's later tracks".

== Track listing ==
Notes from the Archive: Recordings 2011–2016 track listing
No.	Title	Writer(s)	Producer(s)	Length
1.	"Celadon & Gold"	Maggie Rogers; Nicholas Das	Rogers	3:11
2.	"Together"	Rogers	Rogers	3:22
3.	"Steady Now"	Rogers	Rogers	3:51
4.	"One More Afternoon"	Rogers	Rogers	4:39
5.	"Blood Ballet"	Rogers	Rogers	4:23
6.	"Resonant Body"	Rogers	Dan Drohan; Jeff Fettig; Rogers	3:22
7.	"Symmetry"	Rogers; Pablo Melendez	Rogers; Melendez	2:53
8.	"Little Joys"	Rogers	Drohan; Fertig; Rogers	3:55
9.	"On the Page"	Rogers	Rogers	3:20
10.	"James"	Rogers	Rogers	4:29
11.	"(Does It Feel Slow?)" (with Del Water Gap)	Rogers	Rogers	0:17
12.	"New Song" (with Del Water Gap)	Rogers; Samuel Holden Jaffe	Rogers; Jaffe	6:22
13.	"Anybody"	Rogers	Rogers	3:16
14.	"Kids Like Us"	Rogers	Rogers	4:03
15.	"Wolves"	Rogers	Rogers	3:57
16.	"Satellite"	Rogers	Rogers	7:08
Total length:				58:16

Notes from the Archive: Recordings 2011–2016 (With Commentary)
No.	Title	Writer(s)	Producer(s)	Length
1.	"Intro - Notes from the Archive: Recordings 2011-2016" (Commentary)	Maggie Rogers	Hrishikesh Hirway; Rogers; Nick Stumpf	3:10
2.	"Part I - Rock EP: 2016" (Commentary)	Rogers	Hirway; Rogers; Stumpf	6:11
3.	"Celadon & Gold"	Rogers; Das	Rogers	3:11
4.	"Together"	Rogers	Rogers	3:22
5.	"Steady Now"	Rogers	Rogers	3:51
6.	"One More Afternoon"	Rogers	Rogers	4:39
7.	"Part II - Blood Ballet: 2012-2015" (Commentary)	Rogers	Hirway; Rogers; Stumpf	3:56
8.	"Blood Ballet"	Rogers	Rogers	4:23
9.	"Resonant Body"	Rogers	Drohan; Fettig; Rogers	3:22
10.	"Symmetry"	Rogers; Melendez	Rogers; Melendez	2:53
11.	"Little Joys"	Rogers	Drohan; Fertig; Rogers	3:55
12.	"On the Page"	Rogers	Rogers	3:20
13.	"James"	Rogers	Rogers	4:29
14.	"Part III - Del Water Gap: 2012-2013" (Commentary)	Rogers	Hirway; Rogers; Stumpf	3:51
15.	"(Does It Feel Slow?)" (with Del Water Gap)	Rogers	Rogers	0:17
16.	"New Song" (with Del Water Gap)	Rogers; Jaffe	Rogers; Jaffe	6:22
17.	"Part IV - The Echo: 2011-2012" (Commentary)	Rogers	Hirway; Rogers; Stumpf	4:07
18.	"Anybody"	Rogers	Rogers	3:16
19.	"Kids Like Us"	Rogers	Rogers	4:03
20.	"Wolves"	Rogers	Rogers	3:57
21.	"Satellite"	Rogers	Rogers	7:08
22.	"Outro - Notes From the Archives: Recordings 2011-2016" (Commentary)	Rogers	Hirway; Rogers; Stumpf	3:41
Total length:				1:23:12

== Personnel ==
Musicians

- Maggie Rogers – lead vocals, guitar
- Nicholas Das – guitar
- Andrew Campbell – guitar
- Dan Hemerlein – bass
- S. Holden Jaffe – lead vocals, guitar

Technical

- Maggie Rogers – mixer
- Chris Allgood – mastering engineer
- Aaron Bastinelli – engineer
- Jeff Fettig – engineer, mixer
- Kurt Goebel – mixer
- Peter Hoopes – engineer
- Andre Kelman – engineer
- Emily Lazar – mastering engineer
- Pablo Melendez – engineer, mixer
- Jason. Moss – engineer
- Jake Rodenhouse – mastering engineer
- Alex Ryaboy – engineer
- Douglas Schadt – mastering engineer, mixer
- Damien Wiseman – engineer
- Veronica Wyman – engineer

== Charts ==
Chart (2021)	Peak position
US Top Album Sales (Billboard)	72
