= Love You for a Long Time (Maggie Rogers song) =

Single by Maggie Rogers

from the album Mixtape 002: Dusk
- Released: November 21, 2019
- Length: 3:44
- Label: Debay; Capitol
- Songwriter(s): Maggie Rogers; Doc McKinney; Michael Sonier
- Producer(s): Nate Mercerea; Maggie Rogers; Ricky Reed

Maggie Rogers singles chronology
"Burning" (2019)	"Love You for a Long Time" (2019)	"That's Where I Am" (2022)

"Love You for a Long Time" is a song by American singer and songwriter Maggie Rogers. It was released on November 21, 2019, as a standalone single; it was later included as a part of Roger's 2022 mixtape, Mixtape 002: Dusk.

== Background ==
The song focuses on long-term devotion for a romantic partner. In a press statement, Rogers revealed that she wrote the song while completing her debut studio album, Heard It in a Past Life, and that she waited to record the song to "showcase the deep personal and creative bonds" she had with her live band. On the song, she said:

It’s a song about love in all its forms – romantic love, the love I feel for my friends, the love I feel for my band, and the love I've shared with all of you. I wanted it to sound like the last days of summer. I wanted it to sound as wild and alive as new love feels.

== Personnel ==
- Maggie Rogers – guitar, vocals, production
- Nate Mercereau – bass, guitar, piano, production
- Ricky Reed – guitar, vocals, production
- Doc McKinney – songwriting
- Michael Sonier – songwriting
- Ethan Shumaker – engineer
- Chris Galland – mix engineer
- Manny Marroquin – mixing
- Robin Florent – assistant mixer
- Scott Desmarais – assistant mixer
- Jeremie Inhaber – assistant mixer
- Emily Lazar – mastering

== Charts ==
Chart performance for "Love You for a Long Time"
Chart (2019–2020)	Peak position
Belgium (Ultratop 50 Flanders)	44
New Zealand (Recorded Music NZ)	27
US Adult Alternative Songs (Billboard)	1
