= On and Off (Maggie Rogers song) =

Single by Maggie Rogers

from the EP Now That the Light Is Fading and the album Heard It in a Past Life
- Released: January 17, 2017
- Genre: Folk-dance; pop
- Length: 3:41
- Label: Debay Sounds; Capitol
- Songwriters: Maggie Rogers; Nicholas Das
- Producers: Maggie Rogers; Nick Das; Doug Schadt

Maggie Rogers singles chronology
"Dog Years" (2016)	"On and Off" (2017)	"Split Stones" (2017)

Music video
- "On and Off" on YouTube

"On and Off" (stylized "On + Off") is a song by American singer-songwriter Maggie Rogers. It was released on January 17, 2017, through Debay Sounds and Capitol Records as the third single from her debut extended play (EP), Now That the Light Is Fading (2017). The song was written by Rogers, and Nick Das, with the production being handled by Rogers, Das, and Doug Schadt.

== Background ==
In an interview with BBC Radio 1's MistaJam, Rogers stated "This was one of the very first songs—I made it right after 'Alaska'. The lyrics, there’s this sort of sexual cliché in the song. There’s a lyric that says you turn me on, but if you listen to the rest of the lyrics, that is actually about emotional stability and being on and off and finding a person that grounds you. I think that’s one of the most important things to me in relationships." She also said in an interview with Pigeons and Planes's Eric Skelton "It's a song you can dance to and a song you can get down to, but for me there's a lot of heart and soul in it, too."

== Critical reception ==
Mike Wass of Idolator called it "a dizzy love song with breathy vocals and warm, multi-layered production." Paste's Carter Shelter said "there are hints of Sia in the chorus, but the song retains that touch of atmospheric minimalism that made 'Alaska' such a standout. Rogers is batting three for three right now, and the signs don’t point to her letting up." Chris Payne of Billboard stated that "On and Off" "sounds quite contemporary in 2017—not as singularly so as the transcendent 'Alaska'—but a solid offering nonetheless. And as a wistful, glistening, downtempo pop song, it's perhaps her best crossover play yet." Pitchfork's Cameron Cook said "Rogers' voice is practically bursting at the seams with originality, and her new track solidifies her status as a veritable breakout star. Structured around a tight keyboard loop and Rogers' pitch-shifting falsetto, it elegantly recalls a carefree summer that so many dance singles try to capture, but much like her breakthrough hit 'Alaska', retains a homespun feel that sets it apart. After an echoing handclap announces the chorus, Rogers, chants her way across a velvety electronic groove, layering her vocals like a choir. There's an earnestness here that you simply can't fake. Standing at the intersection of so many genres (pop, folk, soul, and dance), Rogers' music is united by the brazen heart she wears on her sleeve."

== Music video ==
A music video, directed by Zia Anger, was released on February 1, 2017. Carter Shelter of Paste described the music video: "[the video] sees Rogers and a trio of backup dancers working through choreography and costume changes in what appears to be one continuous take. Rogers comes across as charming, lacking the distance that often results from traditional pop shine (see: Sia), which makes it obvious why director Zia Anger left in the moment when she and her compadres break into laughter after completing the routine."

== Charts ==
Chart (2017)	Peak position
US Hot Rock Songs (Billboard)	44
US Adult Alternative Songs (Billboard)	20

== Release history ==
Region	Date	Format	Label	Ref.
United States	January 17, 2017	Digital download	Debay Sounds; Capitol	
United Kingdom	February 24, 2017	Contemporary hit radio	Debay Sounds; Capitol	
