= Sharon Valley =

Sharon Valley may refer to:

- Sharon Valley, California
- Sharon Valley, Connecticut
- Sharon Valley, Israel
