= Split Stones =

2017 song by Maggie Rogers

Single by Maggie Rogers
- Released: September 20, 2017
- Genre: Pop
- Length: 3:51
- Label: Debay; Capitol
- Songwriters: Maggie Rogers; Andrew Seltzer; Doug Schadt
- Producers: Rogers; Seltzer; Schadt

Maggie Rogers singles chronology
"On + Off" (2017)	"Split Stones" (2017)	"Fallingwater" (2018)

Music video
- "Split Stones" on YouTube

"Split Stones" is a song by American singer-songwriter Maggie Rogers. It was written and produced by Rogers, Andrew Seltzer and Doug Schadt. The song was released on September 20, 2017, through Debay Sounds and Capitol Records.

== Background ==
Rogers has performed the song live on tour and the festival circuit in the summer. She collaborated with The North Face to promote the single, in conjunction with the release of the Ventrix jacket. Fans are able to unlock the song through a digital experience using their mobile devices. She explained the inspiration behind the song in a commercial for the advertising campaign: "I took the first sound samples for 'Split Stones' on a month-long backpacking trip in Oregon during the summer of 2013; I've been collecting samples and piecing the song together in bedroom studios and trails ever since. I'm super excited about combining the two things I love-technology and the environment-to create a way that people can hear the song, but also feel a little bit a part of the action and process that inspired it." Rogers wrote in a handwritten note she shared on social media that "Split Stones" is "a parting gift" and "a song I made in college and have held onto for a while – one I've had so much fun playing live this year for all of you. This is me saying goodbye for a little while. Here's to the end of the beginning and the start of everything else."

== Critical reception ==
Sarah Montgomery of The Fader referred "Split Stones" to a "dance-y, pop song" that "takes samples from outdoor excursions and is inspired by nature in the same way 'Alaska' was". Lisa Nguyen of Paste called it an "invigorating track" and felt it "offers encouraging lyrics, using the singer's melodically husky voice and rhythmic instrumentals as a vehicle". Chris DeVille of Stereogum wrote that the song features "an electronic backbeat that wallops with more force than usual", and opined that "the chorus sounds very big and is really pretty". Caitlin White of Uproxx noted that she "fell for [the song] immediately" after unlocking it through the marketing campaign. Eve Barlow of Pitchfork wrote: "Despite its organic origins, it is more of a dance number, and is structured like a house track, even though it doesn't really sound anything like one."

== Credits and personnel ==
Credits adapted from Tidal.

- Maggie Rogers – songwriting, production, vocals
- Andrew Seltzer – songwriting, production
- Doug Schadt – songwriting, production, recording engineering
- Brandon Bost – assistant mixing
- Tom Elmhirst – mixing
