= Surrender (Maggie Rogers album) =

Studio album by Maggie Rogers
- Released: July 29, 2022
- Studios: Electric Lady (New York City); Real World (Box, Wiltshire); Sid's Palace (Scarborough, Maine); Rogers' parents' garage
- Genres: Indie pop; alternative pop; electropop
- Length: 46:16
- Labels: Debay Sounds; Capitol
- Producers: Maggie Rogers; Kid Harpoon; Del Water Gap; Gabe Goodman

Maggie Rogers chronology
Notes from the Archive: Recordings 2011–2016 (2020)	Surrender (2022)	Don't Forget Me (2024)

Singles from Surrender
- 1. "That's Where I Am" Released: April 8, 2022; 2. "Want Want" Released: June 1, 2022; 3. "Horses" Released: July 14, 2022

Professional ratings
Aggregate scores
Source	Rating
AnyDecentMusic?	7.4/10
Metacritic	80/100
Review scores
Source	Rating
AllMusic	4/5 stars
Clash	8/10
The Line of Best Fit	7/10
NME	4/5 stars
Paste	7.8/10
Pitchfork	7.3/10
Rolling Stone	3.5/5 stars
Under the Radar	8.5/10 stars

Surrender is the second studio album by American indie pop singer-songwriter Maggie Rogers, released on July 29, 2022, by Debay Sounds and Capitol Records. It follows the release of her debut studio album, Heard It in a Past Life (2019).

The album features a couple of contributions from notable singers. The track "Shatter" features Florence Welch of Florence and the Machine providing additional vocals and playing tambourine, and "I've Got a Friend" features Clairo and Claud speaking.

The trailer for the Netflix series XO, Kitty featured "Want Want" from this album.

== Background and promotion ==
Rogers teased recording sessions for her forthcoming second studio album throughout 2021 into early 2022. She stated that the album would be self-produced and sounded like "feral joy", which is what she would later name her tour in support of the album. In March 2022, Rogers shared a link to a site counting down to March 30. On that day, she announced that her second studio album, titled Surrender, would be released on July 29, 2022. Rogers simultaneously released an album trailer she co-directed with Michael Scanlon. On June 15, 2022, Rogers revealed the album's track listing via Instagram.

== Composition ==
Surrender is an indie pop, alternative pop, and electropop album with elements of alternative rock, dance, Americana, new wave, electroacoustic, slacker rock, synth-pop, folk, glam rock, and sunshine pop.

== Critical reception ==
Year-end lists
Publication	Accolade	Rank	Ref
Albumism	The 100 Best Albums of 2022	21	
A.V. Club	The 30 Best Albums of 2022	13	
Billboard	Best Albums of 2022	14	
Clash	Clash Albums of the Year 2022	9	
Dork	Dork's Albums of the Year 2022	6	
Esquire	25 Best Music Albums of 2022	Unranked	
The Forty-Five	The Best Albums of 2022	19	
musicOMH	Top 50 Albums Of 2022	44	
Rolling Stone	The 100 Best Albums of 2022	49	
Under the Radar	Best Albums of 2022	22	

== Track listing ==
All tracks are written and produced by Maggie Rogers and Kid Harpoon, except where noted.

Surrender track listing
No.	Title	Writer(s)	Producer(s)	Length
1.	"Overdrive"			3:14
2.	"That's Where I Am"			4:12
3.	"Want Want"	Rogers; Hull; Samuel Holden Jaffe	Rogers; Kid Harpoon; Del Water Gap	3:08
4.	"Anywhere With You"	Rogers; Jaffe	Rogers; Kid Harpoon; Del Water Gap	4:57
5.	"Horses"			5:05
6.	"Be Cool"			2:57
7.	"Shatter"			3:40
8.	"Begging for Rain"	Rogers		4:13
9.	"I've Got a Friend"			3:12
10.	"Honey"			3:42
11.	"Symphony"	Rogers; Gabriel Bennett Goodman	Rogers; Kid Harpoon; Gabe Goodman	5:11
12.	"Different Kind of World"			2:45
Total length:				46:16

== Personnel ==
Credits are adapted from the Surrender liner notes.

Musicians

- Maggie Rogers – vocals (all tracks), piano (1, 3, 4, 8, 10, 11), clapping (2), synthesizer (2–4, 6, 10, 11), drum programming (3), programming (4), electric guitar (5), acoustic guitar (8)
- Kid Harpoon – bass, electric guitar, synthesizer (1–8, 10, 11); drums (1, 2, 7, 8, 10, 11), 12-string acoustic guitar (2), acoustic guitar (2, 5, 9), drum programming (2–7, 10, 11), programming (4), piano (7, 10), synth bass (8, 10)
- Pino Palladino – bass (1, 9)
- Giveton Gelin – trumpet (1)
- Jeremy Hatcher – vocal programming (1, 2, 10)
- Ben Lovett – synthesizer (2, 7), piano (7)
- Del Water Gap – drum programming (3); electric guitar, programming, synthesizer (4)
- Matt Barrick – drums (3)
- Aaron Sterling – drums (4)
- Jon Batiste – piano (6, 9), synthesizer (6), melodica (8)
- Florence Welch – additional vocals, tambourine (7)
- Claire Cottrill – speaker (9)
- Claud – speaker (9)
- Gabe Goodman – acoustic guitar, bass, drum programming, piano, synthesizer (11)

Technical

- Emily Lazar – mastering
- Chris Allgood – mastering
- Mark "Spike" Stent – mixing
- Jeremy Hatcher – engineering
- Mark Rankin – engineering (1–4, 6–9)
- Gabe Goodman – engineering (3, 11)
- Matt Wolach – mixing assistance
- Del Water Gap – additional engineering (4)
- Carl Bespolka – additional engineering (7, 9), engineering assistance (1–9, 11)
- Katie May – engineering assistance (1–9, 11)
- Lance Powell – engineering assistance (10, 11)

== Charts ==
Chart performance for Surrender
Chart (2022)	Peak position
Australian Albums (ARIA)	39
Belgian Albums (Ultratop Flanders)	132
Canadian Albums (Billboard)	77
German Albums (Offizielle Top 100)	62
Irish Albums (IRMA)	73
Scottish Albums (Official Charts)	3
UK Albums (Official Charts)	6
US Billboard 200	12
US Top Alternative Albums (Billboard)	2
US Top Rock Albums (Billboard)	3
US Indie Store Album Sales (Billboard)	1
