= Maggie Rogers =

American musician (born 1994)

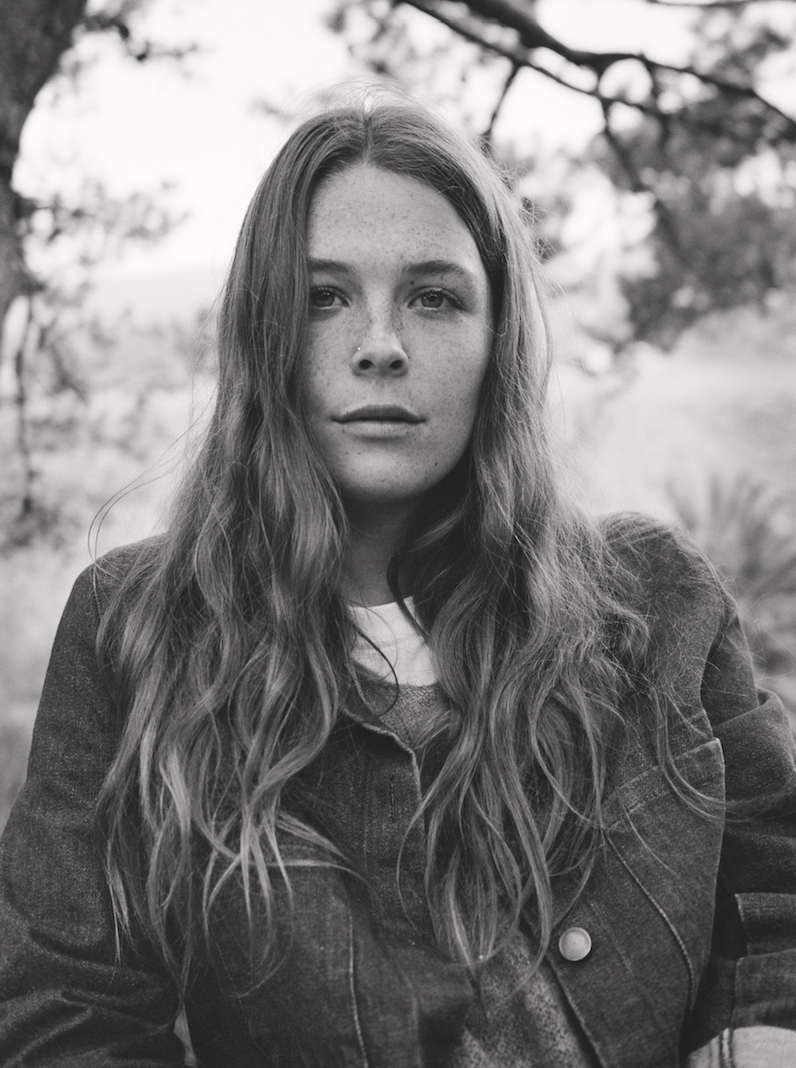
- Rogers in 2019
- Born: Margaret Debay Rogers; April 25, 1994 (age 32); Easton, Maryland, U.S.
- Education: New York University (BFA); Harvard University (MRPL)
- Occupations: Singer-songwriter; record producer
- Years active: 2012–present
- Musical career
- Genres: Pop; folk; art pop; indie pop; folk-pop
- Instruments: Vocals; guitar; piano; banjo; harp
- Labels: Debay Sounds; Capitol
- Website: maggierogers.com

Margaret Debay Rogers (born April 25, 1994) is an American singer-songwriter and record producer from Easton, Maryland. She received widespread recognition after her song "Alaska" was played to artist-in-residence Pharrell Williams during a master class at the Clive Davis Institute of Recorded Music at the New York University Tisch School of the Arts in Manhattan in 2016. She has released two independent albums, The Echo (2012) and Blood Ballet (2014), and three studio albums, Heard It in a Past Life (2019), Surrender (2022), and Don't Forget Me (2024). She was nominated for a Grammy Award for Best New Artist in 2020.

== Biography ==
=== Early life (1994–2012) ===
Maggie Rogers grew up on the Eastern Shore of Maryland along the banks of the Miles River in Easton, Maryland. Her father is a retired Ford Motor Company dealership owner and her mother, a former nurse, is an end-of-life doula. Neither of her parents are musical. She began playing harp at age seven and loved the music of Gustav Holst and Antonio Vivaldi. Her mother often played music by neo-soul artists including Erykah Badu and Lauryn Hill. By the time she was in middle school, she had added piano and guitar to her repertoire and began writing songs in eighth grade. She attended Worcester Preparatory School, followed by The Gunston School, a high school in Centreville, Maryland before going to St. Andrew's School, a boarding school in Middletown, Delaware, from which she graduated. At school, she played harp in the orchestra, sang in the choir, joined a jazz band, learned banjo, and became interested in folk music. She also taught herself how to program and create music. Many of the first concerts she went to were at Merriweather Post Pavilion in Columbia, Maryland, including Mumford & Sons and the Black Eyed Peas. She went to a rural camp which had no electricity in Maine for many summers.

The summer after her junior year in high school, Rogers attended a Berklee College of Music program and won the program's songwriting contest, which spurred her to focus on songwriting. During her high school senior year, she made her television debut at DelmarvaLife and recorded music for what became her first album, The Echo (2012). She included her demos as part of her application to the Clive Davis Institute of Recorded Music at the New York University Tisch School of the Arts, was accepted there and enrolled in 2012. She and her friend often dj'ed at her favorite bar, Enid's in Greenpoint.

=== College years and discovery (2012–2016) ===
At NYU, Rogers considered a career in music journalism, and in her first year, Rogers interned for music journalist Lizzy Goodman for whom she transcribed and edited hundreds of hours of interviews with major musicians and journalists. They were compiled into Goodman's 2017 book Meet Me in the Bathroom. Rogers formed a band called Del Water Gap with singer-songwriter S. Holden Jaffe. They later split so that each could explore more solo work. Their song "New Song" appears on Notes from the Archive: Recordings 2011–2016 (2020).

Rogers released another folk album, Blood Ballet (2014) during her second year at the school. Folk blog EarToTheGround Music said that the album "begs for listeners to confront deep personal emotions." Buzzkill Magazine felt that Rogers "really starts to find her folksy feet" with "Little Joys" from Blood Ballet. She studied abroad in France while at NYU and after friends convinced her to go clubbing while they were in Berlin, she discovered an affinity for dance music. When she returned home, she began distilling elements of dance music into her work.

In 2016, after experiencing two years of writer's block, Rogers wrote "Alaska", a song she wrote in fifteen minutes about a National Outdoor Leadership School course. She played the song for Pharrell Williams, an artist-in-residence who visited her class to critique student work. Williams said of the song: "I've never heard anything that sounds like that." A video of a visibly moved Williams listening to the song went viral that June, resulting in millions of views as well as hundreds of thousands of plays of The Echo and Blood Ballet. Rogers graduated from New York University's Clive Davis Institute of Recorded Music in May 2016 with a degree in music engineering and production and English.

=== Graduate school (2021–2022) ===
In September 2021, Rogers tweeted that she had started graduate school at Harvard Divinity School, where she was "studying the spirituality of public gatherings and the ethics of power in pop culture" and to learn "how to keep art sacred". She graduated in May 2022 with a master's degree in religion and public life, writing a thesis which "examined cultural consciousness, the spirituality of public gathering and the ethics of pop power". Her 2022 studio album, Surrender, was a component of the thesis. From December 1, 2023, through May 31, 2024, Rogers was a Religion and Public Life Fellow at Harvard Divinity School. During that time she researched and wrote for work for her MRPL degree which explored the relationships of religion, spirituality, and pop culture from her vantage point as a performing artist.

=== Music career (2016–present) ===
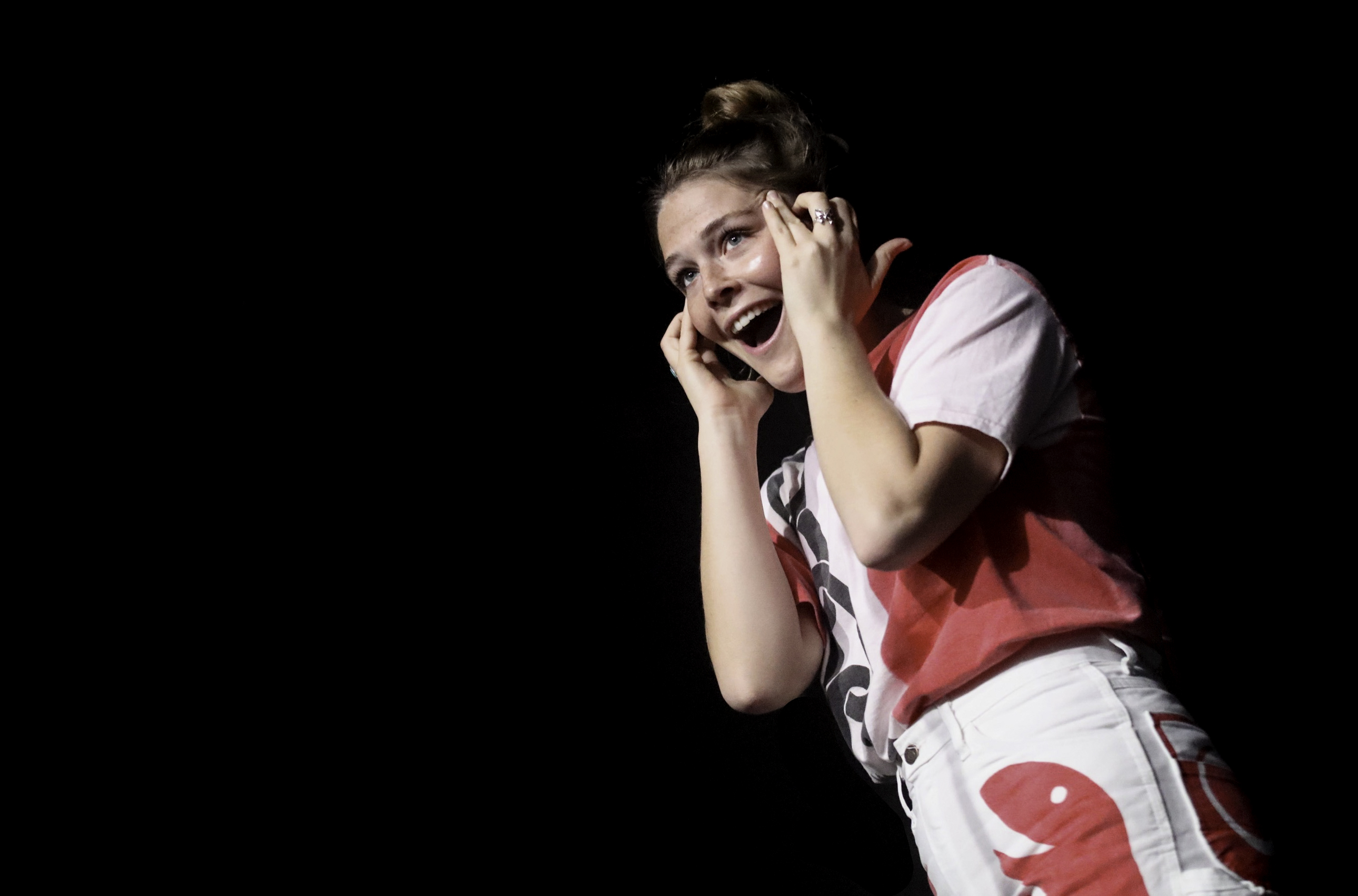
Rogers performing at First Avenue in Minneapolis, Minnesota, October 2018

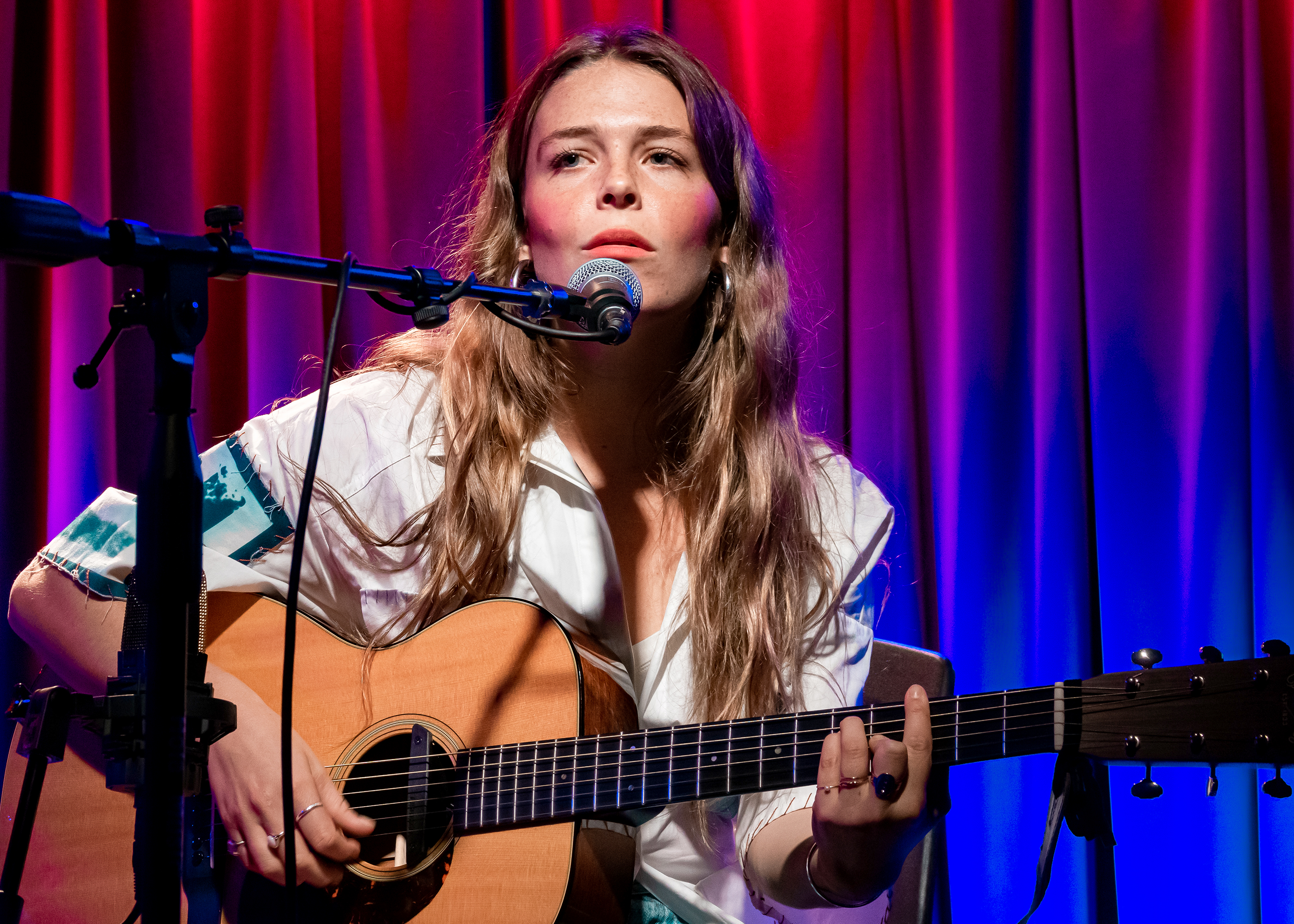
Rogers performing live at the Grammy Museum in Los Angeles, California, September 2019

After the Pharrell video went viral in 2016, several record labels tried to sign Rogers. She signed a recording contract with Capitol Records on the same day she signed a lease for a Greenpoint, Brooklyn studio apartment. "She licenses her music to them through her own imprint, Debay Sounds." As a result, she has more control over her sound and image than many artists at a similar place in their music careers. Rogers' EP, Now That the Light Is Fading, was released on February 17, 2017. She released her major-label debut studio album, Heard It in a Past Life, on January 18, 2019. The album debuted at No. 2 on the US Billboard 200. Rogers made her The Tonight Show Starring Jimmy Fallon debut on February 15, 2017, Saturday Night Live debut on November 3, 2018, and Today Show debut on July 12, 2019.

In April 2019, Rogers covered the Taylor Swift song "Tim McGraw" as a Spotify Single. On November 1, 2019, she guested with Dead & Company, a rock band consisting of former Grateful Dead members, performing cover versions of the latter's "Friend of the Devil" and the Band's "The Weight" at Madison Square Garden in Midtown Manhattan. Also in November 2019, Rogers earned a nomination for Best New Artist at the 62nd Grammy Awards. Rogers performed during the 2020 Democratic National Convention, appearing remotely from Scarborough, Maine due to the COVID-19 pandemic in the United States. She was introduced by the speaker of the Maine House of Representatives and Sara Gideon, a 2020 U.S. Senate candidate from Maine.

On November 13, 2020, Rogers collaborated with Phoebe Bridgers on a cover version of the Goo Goo Dolls' 1998 single "Iris", which Bridgers said she would make if Donald Trump lost the 2020 United States elections. The song was released as a one-day exclusive on Bandcamp and was downloaded 28,000 times at a pay what you want cost, with all proceeds going to Fair Fight Action. Despite only being available for purchase for one day, the song debuted at number one on the Digital Songs chart and No. 57 on the Billboard Hot 100, making it both artists' first entry on the latter chart. The song also charted in Australia, New Zealand, and Scotland.

On December 18, 2020, Rogers released Notes from the Archive: Recordings 2011–2016 via her label Debay Sounds. The album is a compilation of songs she wrote and recorded in the previous ten years of her recording career. Some of the songs are from her first two independently released albums: The Echo (2012) and Blood Ballet (2014). Other songs are from her previously unreleased 2016 rock EP and a band she was previously in with Holden Jaffe, Del Water Gap. The album was released along with a deluxe version in which Rogers provides an auditory commentary talking through each stage of her music career that the songs in that section reflect. Her second studio album, Surrender, was released on July 29, 2022. It includes the singles "That's Where I Am", "Want Want", and "Horses". The track "Shatter" features Florence Welch of Florence and the Machine providing additional vocals and playing tambourine, and "I've Got a Friend" features Clairo and Claud speaking.

On January 27, 2023, Rogers collaborated with country star Zach Bryan on the single “Dawns”. The single peaked at 42 on the Billboard Hot 100. On June 24, 2023, Rogers played Glastonbury Festival, in Somerset, UK. On August 5, 2023, Rogers played at Lollapalooza, in Chicago, Illinois. On January 24, 2024, Rogers announced the February 8, 2024, release of "Don't Forget Me" as the first single of her third album. On April 12, 2024, Rogers released her third album, Don't Forget Me. The album was written over five days in December 2022 and January 2023. Rogers said of the album, "Some of these stories on this album are mine. And for the first time really, some of them are not. The moments that are mine feel like memories—glimpses from college, details from when I was 18, 22, 28 (I'm 29 now). In writing the album sequentially, at some point a character emerged." On October 8, 2024, Rogers released the standalone single "In the Living Room".

On April 24, 2025, Rogers and Sylvan Esso released a cover of Broken Social Scene's "Anthems For a Seventeen Year-Old Girl" as the lead single for a cover album to celebrate the 20th anniversary of the band's album You Forgot It in People.

On May 16, 2025, Rogers returned to Tisch School for the Arts, where she attended and graduated in 2016, to deliver the commencement address to the class of 2025. She told the graduates, "The thing about being an artist is that it's not a profession, it's a vocation. It's not something you do, or sign up for, it's who you are."

Rogers provided backing vocals for the song "Mind" on the Dalai Lama's album Meditation: Reflections Of His Holiness The Dalai Lama, which was released August 29, 2025. The work won Best Audio Book, Narration & Storytelling Recording at the 68th Annual Grammy Awards.

== Influences ==
Rogers cites Carrie Brownstein, Patti Smith, Kim Gordon of Sonic Youth, and Björk as her musical inspirations, while prominent singers Brandi Carlile and Sharon Van Etten — whom she calls her "musical big sisters" — have become mentors.

== Performances ==
=== Tours ===
Headliner

- Heard It in a Past Life World Tour (2019) (supported by Empress Of, Jacob Banks, Melanie Faye, and Now, Now)
  - Included stops at Coachella, Shaky Knees Music Festival, Forecastle Festival, and Newport Folk Festival
- The Feral Joy Tour (2022) (supported by Samia & Del Water Gap)
- Summer of '23 Tour (2023) (supported by Soccer Mommy & Alvvays)
- Don't Forget Me Tour (2024) (supported by The Japanese House & Ryan Beatty)

Opening act

- Haim — Sister Sister Sister Tour (2018)
- Kacey Musgraves — Oh, What a World: Tour II (October 25, 2019)
- Mumford & Sons — Delta Tour (2018)
  - Leg 1 in Europe and Leg 2 in North America
- Coldplay – Music of the Spheres World Tour (2024)
  - Munich, Vienna and Dublin

=== Festivals ===
Rogers has performed at festivals including:

- United States: All Things Go, Austin City Limits Music Festival, Bonnaroo 2024, Coachella, Governors Ball Music Festival, Lollapalooza, South by Southwest, Boston Calling Music Festival, Outside Lands Music and Arts Festival, Firefly Music Festival, Newport Folk Festival, and Shaky Knees Music Festival.
- Europe: Glastonbury Festival in Pilton, Somerset, England; Rock Werchter in Werchter, Belgium; Latitude Festival in Henham Park, UK; Citadel Festival in London; Down the Rabbit Hole in Ewijk, Netherlands; and at the Main Square Festival in Arras, France
- Canada: Osheaga Festival in Montreal, Canada Sommo Festival in Cavendish, PEI, Canada
- Australia: Splendour in the Grass Festival in Byron Bay, New South Wales

== Personal life ==
Rogers has said that she has synesthesia, a benign condition where two or more senses are perceived at once. In her case, she is able to perceive colors as a response to hearing music. Rogers says that she is spiritual, but not necessarily religious. In October 2019, Rogers purchased a 1,034 square-foot home in Los Angeles for $1.29 million.

=== Activism and philanthropy ===
Her song "Give a Little" was penned on the same day the National School Walkout demanded congressional action on gun control. She was inspired by the activism of students across the nation, and wrote "Give a Little" about empathy and unity. Rogers has donated proceeds from certain merchandise and shows to the American Civil Liberties Union and Planned Parenthood. She has raised funds by charging pay what you want for certain song downloads, including a cover of the Goo Goo Dolls' Iris with Phoebe Bridgers, with all proceeds going to charities such as the pro-choice Brigid Alliance and Fair Fight Action, which supports suffrage. She has stated that she is "proudly, loudly and distinctly pro-choice".

Rogers performed at the 2020 Democratic National Convention. In a post on Twitter that night, she endorsed Sara Gideon, who introduced her performance, in the 2020 United States Senate election in Maine. While on her Don't Forget Me Tour, Maryland Governor Wes Moore proclaimed June 16, 2024, as Maggie Rogers Day in the state, citing her work registering voters, championing women's reproductive rights, and fighting for fair concert ticket pricing. Rogers endorsed Kamala Harris for the 2024 election, and performed for her at a rally in Ann Arbor.

== Discography ==
=== Studio albums ===
List of studio albums, with selected chart positions
Title	Album details	Peak positions										Sales	Certifications
Title	Album details	US	AUS	BEL (FL)	CAN	GER	IRE	NL	SCO	SWI	UK	Sales	Certifications
Heard It in a Past Life	Release date: January 18, 2019; Label: Debay Sounds, Capitol; Formats: Digital download, CD, LP, streaming, cassette	2	8	92	10	—	30	95	18	49	25	US: 37,000	RIAA: Gold; MC: Gold
Surrender	Released: July 29, 2022; Label: Debay Sounds, Capitol; Formats: Digital download, CD, LP, streaming, cassette	12	39	132	77	62	73	—	3	—	6		
Don't Forget Me	Released: April 12, 2024; Label: Debay Sounds, Capitol; Formats: Digital download, CD, LP, streaming	48	—	198	—	—	—	—	10	—	12		
"—" denotes an album that did not chart or was not released in that territory.

=== Independent albums ===
Title	Album details
The Echo	Released: May 18, 2012; Label: Self-released; Format: Digital download
Blood Ballet	Released: July 2, 2014; Label: Self-released; Format: Digital download

=== Compilation albums ===
List of compilation albums, with selected chart positions
Title	Details	Peak positions
Title	Details	US Sales
Notes from the Archive: Recordings 2011–2016	Released: December 18, 2020; Label: Debay Sounds; Format: CD, LP, digital download, streaming	72

=== Extended plays ===
List of EPs, with selected chart positions
Title	Details	Peak positions		
Title	Details	US Heat.	US Rock	US Sales
Now That the Light Is Fading	Release date: February 16, 2017; Label: Debay Sounds, Capitol; Format: Digital download, CD, LP, streaming	4	39	99
Spotify Singles	Release date: December 12, 2018; Label: Debay Sounds, Capitol; Format: Streaming	—	—	—
Mixtape 001: Dawn	Release date: February 23, 2022; Label: Debay Sounds, Capitol; Format: Digital download, CD, LP, streaming	—	—	—
Mixtape 002: Dusk	Release date: March 2, 2022; Label: Debay Sounds, Capitol; Format: Digital download, CD, LP, streaming	—	—	—
Mixtape 003: Night Drive	Release date: March 10, 2022; Label: Debay Sounds, Capitol; Format: Digital download, CD, LP, streaming	—	—	—

=== Singles ===
==== As lead artist ====
List of singles, with selected chart positions, showing year released and album name
Title	Year	Peak positions										Certifications	Album
Title	Year	US DL	US Adult	US Rock	AUS Hit.	BEL (FL) Tip	BEL (WA) Tip	CAN Rock	ICE	NZ Hot	UK Indie	Certifications	Album
"Alaska" (Note: This song also appears on Rogers' debut studio album Heard It in a Past Life.)	2016	—	—	18	—	13	—	—	—	—	33	RIAA: Platinum; BPI: Gold; MC: Gold	Now That the Light Is Fading
"Dog Years"	2016	—	—	—	—	— (Note: "Dog Years" did not enter the Flanders Ultratop 50, but charted as an "extra tip" on the Ultratip chart.)	—	—	—	—	—		Now That the Light Is Fading
"On and Off"	2017	—	—	44	—	— (Note: "On and Off" did not enter the Flanders Ultratop 50, but charted as an "extra tip" on the Ultratip chart.)	—	—	—	—	—		Now That the Light Is Fading
"Split Stones"	2017	—	—	—	—	—	—	—	—	—	—		Non-album single
"Fallingwater"	2018	—	—	— (Note: "Fallingwater" did not enter the Hot Rock & Alternative Songs chart but peaked at number 11 on the Alternative Digital Song Sales chart.)	—	— (Note: "Fallingwater" did not enter the Flanders Ultratop 50, but charted as an "extra tip" on the Ultratip chart.)	36	—	—	—	—	RIAA: Gold	Heard It in a Past Life
"Give a Little"	2018	—	—	—	—	— (Note: "Give a Little" did not enter the Flanders Ultratop 50, but charted as an "extra tip" on the Ultratip chart.)	—	—	—	—	—		Heard It in a Past Life
"Light On"	2018	—	31	— (Note: "Light On" did not enter the Hot Rock & Alternative Songs chart but did peak at number 35 on the Rock Airplay chart.)	4	—	— (Note: "Light On" did not enter the Wallnie Ultratop 50, but charted as an "extra tip" on the Ultratip chart.)	—	—	40	—	RIAA: Platinum; BPI: Silver; MC: Gold	Heard It in a Past Life
"Burning"	2019	—	—	— (Note: "Burning" did not enter the Hot Rock & Alternative Songs chart but did peak at number 50 on the Rock Airplay chart.)	—	—	—	—	—	32	—		Heard It in a Past Life
"Love You for a Long Time"	2019	45	—	— (Note: "Love You for a Long Time" did not enter the Hot Rock & Alternative Songs chart but did peak at number 45 on the Rock Airplay chart.)	—	44	27	—	—	27	—	RIAA: Gold	Mixtape 002: Dusk
"That's Where I Am"	2022	—	—	28	—	—	—	—	—	35	—		Surrender
"Want Want"	2022	—	—	32	—	—	—	36	36	—	—		Surrender
"Horses"	2022	—	—	—	—	—	—	—	—	—	—		Surrender
"Don't Forget Me"	2024	—	—	45	—	—	—	—	—	—	—		Don't Forget Me
"So Sick of Dreaming"	2024	—	—	—	—	—	—	—	—	—	—		Don't Forget Me
"In the Living Room"	2024	—	—	— (Note: "In the Living Room" did not enter the Hot Rock & Alternative Songs chart, but did peak at number 39 on the Rock & Alternative Airplay chart.)	—	—	—	—	—	—	—		Non-album single
"—" denotes a recording that did not chart or was not released in that territory.

==== As featured artist ====
Title	Year	Peak positions								Certifications	Album
Title	Year	US	US Cou.	US Rock	AUS	CAN	IRE	NZ Hot	WW	Certifications	Album
"Dawns" (Zach Bryan featuring Maggie Rogers)	2023	42	11	4	64	47	36	15	99	RIAA: 3× Platinum; ARIA: Gold	Non-album single
"Any Way" (L'Impératrice featuring Maggie Rogers)	2024	—	—	—	—	—	—	—	—		Pulsar

==== Promotional singles ====
Title	Year	Peak positions										Album
Title	Year	US	US Alt	US Rock	AUS DL	CAN DL	EU	NZ Hot	SCO	UK DL	WW	Album
"Iris" (with Phoebe Bridgers)	2020	57	5	5	2	5	5	16	42	3	122	Non-album single

=== Other charted songs ===
Title	Year	Peak positions		Album
Title	Year	US Rock	NZ Hot	Album
"Anywhere with You"	2022	44	—	Surrender
"The Kill"	2024	34	35	Don't Forget Me

=== Music videos ===
Title	Year	Director
"Alaska"	2016	Zia Anger
"Dog Years"	2016	Zia Anger
"On + Off"	2017	Zia Anger
"Split Stones"	2017	Maggie Rogers
"Back in My Body" (Documentary)	2017	Brendan Hall & Fraser Jones
"Fallingwater"	2018	Zia Anger
"Give a Little"	2018	Maggie Rogers and Alan Del Rio Ortiz
"Light On"	2019	Olivia Bee
"Past Life" (Documentary)	2020	Fraser Jones
"That's Where I Am"	2022	Warren Fu, Maggie Rogers, and Michael Scanlon
"Want Want"	2022	Warren Fu
"Horses"	2022	Maggie Rogers and Michael Scanlon

== Accolades ==
Year	Association	Category	Nominated work	Result	Ref
2020	Grammy Awards	Best New Artist	Herself	Nominated	
2023	People's Choice Country Awards	Crossover Song of 2023	"Dawns"	Nominated	
