= Fallingwater (song) =

2018 single by Maggie Rogers

Single by Maggie Rogers

from the album Heard It in a Past Life
- Released: May 23, 2018
- Recorded: 2016
- Genre: Indie pop
- Length: 4:30
- Label: Debay; Capitol
- Songwriter: Maggie Rogers
- Producers: Maggie Rogers; Rostam Batmanglij

Maggie Rogers singles chronology
"Split Stones" (2017)	"Fallingwater" (2018)	"Give a Little" (2018)

Music video
- "Fallingwater" on YouTube

"Fallingwater" is an indie pop song — with elements of pop and R&B — written, co-produced, and performed by American indie pop singer Maggie Rogers, issued as the third single from her debut studio album Heard It in a Past Life (2019). On November 3, 2018, Rogers performed the song on Saturday Night Live.

== Music video ==
The official music video for "Fallingwater" was directed by Zia Anger. Maggie Rogers is the only person in the video.

== Chart positions ==
Chart (2018)	Peak position
US Alternative Digital Songs Sales (Billboard)	11
