= Elijah Juckett =

- Born: June 8, 1760; Freetown, MA
- Died: August 5, 1839 at age 79; Sharon, CT
- Burial place: Boland Burying Grounds, Sharon, CT
- Military career
- Allegiance: Continental Army
- Branch: United States Army
- Rank: Sergeant
- Unit: 10th Massachusetts Regiment Infantry

Elijah Juckett was an infantryman in the United States' Continental Army during the Revolutionary War. Juckett was born in Freetown, MA on June 8, 1760, to Peter Jacquet Jacket and Thankful Benson in the "old Plymouth Colony." He enlisted as a private in the Continental Army on June 11, 1776, only 3 days after his 16th birthday. As an infantrymen, Juckett served under Col. Benjamin Tupper in the 10th Massachusetts Regiment. His total enlistment was 1 month 18 days as a Private, 10 months as a Sergeant for a total of 24 months on active duty. Eventually, Juckett moved to Sharon, CT where he died on August 5, 1839. Elijah Juckett's name is engraved on the Sharon Veterans Monument. He is buried at Boland Burying Ground in Sharon, Connecticut.
