= Now That the Light Is Fading =

EP by Maggie Rogers
- Released: February 16, 2017
- Genre: Folktronica
- Length: 17:11
- Label: Capitol; Debay
- Producer: Nicholas Das; Maggie Rogers; Doug Schadt; Lucio Westmoreland

Maggie Rogers chronology
Blood Ballet (2014)	Now That the Light Is Fading (2017)	Heard It in a Past Life (2019)

Singles from Now That the Light is Fading
- 1. "Alaska" Released: October 14, 2016; 2. "Dog Years" Released: November 2, 2016; 3. "On and Off" Released: January 17, 2017

Now That the Light Is Fading is the debut extended play by American singer-songwriter Maggie Rogers. Following a series of indie releases and her 2016 breakthrough hit "Alaska", the EP was released on February 16, 2017, by Capitol Records and Rogers' imprint Debay Sounds. The EP received favorable reviews and charted at number four on the Billboard Heatseekers Albums chart, and number 39 on the Top Rock Albums chart.

== Critical reception ==
Professional ratings
Review scores
Source	Rating
AllMusic	4/5 stars
NME	4/5 stars
Pitchfork	6.5/10

Leonie Cooper of NME called the EP "a gossamer- light, glorious thing that, over the course of four songs, builds into something approaching pop perfection." Katherine St. Asaph of Pitchfork was optimistic about Rogers' career going forward, writing "She has a platform. She’s got ideas. But like all discovery stories, the real reward lies in what comes next."

== Track listing ==
Track list adapted from Tidal.

No.	Title	Writer(s)	Producer(s)	Length
1.	"Color Song"	Traditional	Maggie Rogers	2:10
2.	"Alaska"	Doug Schadt; Rogers	Schadt; Rogers	3:09
3.	"On and Off"	Nicholas Das; Rogers	Schadt; Rogers; Das	3:41
4.	"Dog Years"	Schadt; Rogers	Schadt; Rogers	4:37
5.	"Better"	Lucio Westmoreland; Rogers	Schadt; Westmoreland; Rogers	3:34
Total length:				17:11

== Charts ==
Chart (2017)	Peak position
New Zealand Heatseekers Albums (RMNZ)	6
US Top Album Sales (Billboard)	99
US Heatseekers Albums (Billboard)	4
US Top Rock Albums (Billboard)	39
