= Arthur Getz =

American illustrator (1913–1996)

Arthur Kimmig Getz (May 17, 1913 – January 19, 1996) was an American illustrator best known for his fifty-year career as a cover artist for The New Yorker magazine. Between 1938 and 1988, two hundred and thirteen Getz covers appeared on The New Yorker, making Getz the most prolific New Yorker cover artist of the twentieth century. Getz was also a fine artist, painted murals for the Works Progress Administration Program, wrote and illustrated children's books, and taught at the School of Visual Arts in New York City, the University of Connecticut, and the Washington Art Association in Washington, Connecticut. In addition to his New Yorker covers and spot drawings, Getz's illustrations were published in American Childhood, Audubon, Collier's, Consumer Reports, Cue, Esquire, Fortune, The Nation, The National Guardian, The New Masses, The New Republic, PM, Reader's Digest, Saturday Review, Stage, and The Reporter.

== Early years ==
Arthur Getz was born in Passaic, New Jersey, the son of Madeline Kimmig Getz and Anthony Getz. He attended Pratt Institute in Brooklyn, New York, on a full scholarship, and graduated with honors in 1934 from Pratt's School of Fine and Applied Art. His very first cover illustration for The New Yorker was printed on July 23, 1938.

== Murals ==
In 1939, Philip Guston taught Getz how to mix casein tempera, a milk-based pigment utilized for mural painting, and suggested that Getz apply for a New Deal mural contract. Over the next four years, Getz won four mural contracts:

- 1939: Post Office, Lancaster, New York
- 1939: Textile Building, 1939 New York World's Fair
- 1941: Post Office, Bronson, Michigan
- 1942: Post Office, Luverne, Alabama

== The New Yorker ==
After serving in the Philippines during World War II as a First Lieutenant of Field Artillery, Getz returned to New York City and resumed his work as an artist, soon becoming one of the more regular contributors to The New Yorker. During the 1950s and 1960s it was not unusual for more than one Getz cover to be printed on The New Yorker during a single month.

The writer John Updike, in his foreword to The Complete Book of Covers from The New Yorker, 1925 – 1989, wrote: "The artist who has contributed most covers is Arthur Getz, whose alert eye and confident brush find endless silent dramas of contrast and tone in the world around us; beginning in 1938 and still producing, he has thus far published two hundred and thirteen."

Lee Lorenz, the former Art Editor of The New Yorker, wrote of Getz: "[He] seems to have found his particular subject, the special light of Manhattan … Arthur's paintings are a chronicle of New York's moods to be set alongside Guardi's paintings of Venice." Lorenz also wrote of Getz, "He drew inspiration equally from the night clubs of Manhattan and the apple orchards of New England, but his covers, taken as a group, seem really to be about the joy of painting itself."

In addition to his work as an illustration artist, Getz continued to pursue fine art painting. In 1960 he was offered a one-man show at the Babcock Gallery in New York City. The gallery director requested that Getz, already well known for his covers, exhibit his fine art under a different name, concerned that Getz's association with "commercial" (illustration) art would hinder his recognition as a fine artist. Getz used his middle name, Kimmig, for his signature on his fine art work. Many paintings from this era are signed "Kimmig"; some Getz re-signed later and are signed both "Kimmig" and "Getz."

In 1963 Getz and his first wife, Margarita Gibbons, were divorced. Getz later married writer Anne Carriere, and shortly after relocated from New York City to Sharon, Connecticut in 1969, where Getz lived until his death in 1996. His move to Connecticut marked a shift in the mood of his New Yorker covers from the city-centered work of his past. He began to depict more rural scenes of the countryside, familiar to the growing commuter and weekender populations. During this time Getz also wrote and illustrated four children's books and illustrated numerous others, including Jennifer's Walk, authored by Anne Carriere (Getz and Carriere divorced in 1973).

On August 29, 1988, Getz's 213th and final New Yorker cover was printed. Though a stroke rendered Getz blind in one eye in 1994, he continued to paint and draw until his death on January 19, 1996, at the age of 83.

== Works ==
=== Stories and illustrations by Getz ===
- Hamilton Duck, Golden Books, 1972
- Hamilton Duck's Springtime Story, Golden Books, 1974
- Tar Beach, Dial Press, 1979
- Humphrey, The Dancing Pig Dial Press, 1980

=== Illustrations by Getz ===
- Double Trouble by May Garelick, Thomas Y. Crowell, 1958
- Jennifer's Walk by Anne Carriere, Golden Books, 1973
- Mr. Goat's Bad Good Idea by Marileta Robinson, Thomas Y. Crowell, 1979
- Gator & Mary's Traveling Band by David Martin, Dial Press, 1981
- Prisoners of the Good Fight by Carl Geiser, Lawrence Hill & Co., 1986

=== Represented in ===
- The New Yorker Album, 1950 - 1955 Harper & Bros., 1955
- A Century of American Illustration, Brooklyn Museum Press, 1972
- The Northlight Collection, Fletcher Art Services, 1972
- The Creative Expression, North River Press, 1975
- Seasons at The New Yorker, National Academy of Design, 1984
- The Complete Book of Covers from The New Yorker, 1925 – 1989, Alfred A. Knopf, 1989
- The Art of The New Yorker, 1925 - 1995, by Lee Lorenz, Alfred A. Knopf, 1995
- Covering The New Yorker: Cutting-Edge Covers From A Literary Institution, Abbeville Press, 2000
- The Illustrator in America, 1860 - 2000, by Walt Reed, The Society of Illustrators, 2001

== Sources ==
- Getz interview (pages 63–78) in The Creative Expression, North River Press, 1975
- Getz article, "Arthur Getz introduces you to the Encaustic Process and to a selection of his covers for The New Yorker Magazine (pages 104-109), The Northlight Collection, Fletcher Art Services, 1972
- Getz bio, page 272, The Illustrator in America, 1860 - 2000, The Society of Illustrators, 2001
- Getz bio, page 146, A Century of American Illustration, Brooklyn Museum Press, 1972
- John Updike quote: The Complete Book of Covers from The New Yorker, 1925 – 1989 (Alfred A. Knopf, 1989)
- Margarita Gibbons papers, Smithsonian Institution Collection,
- The Art of The New Yorker, 1925 - 1995, Alfred A. Knopf, 1995
- Lee Lorenz quote: "Family Album: Arthur Getz" - The New Yorker, February 5, 1996
