= Housatonic Meadows State Park =

State park in Litchfield County, Connecticut

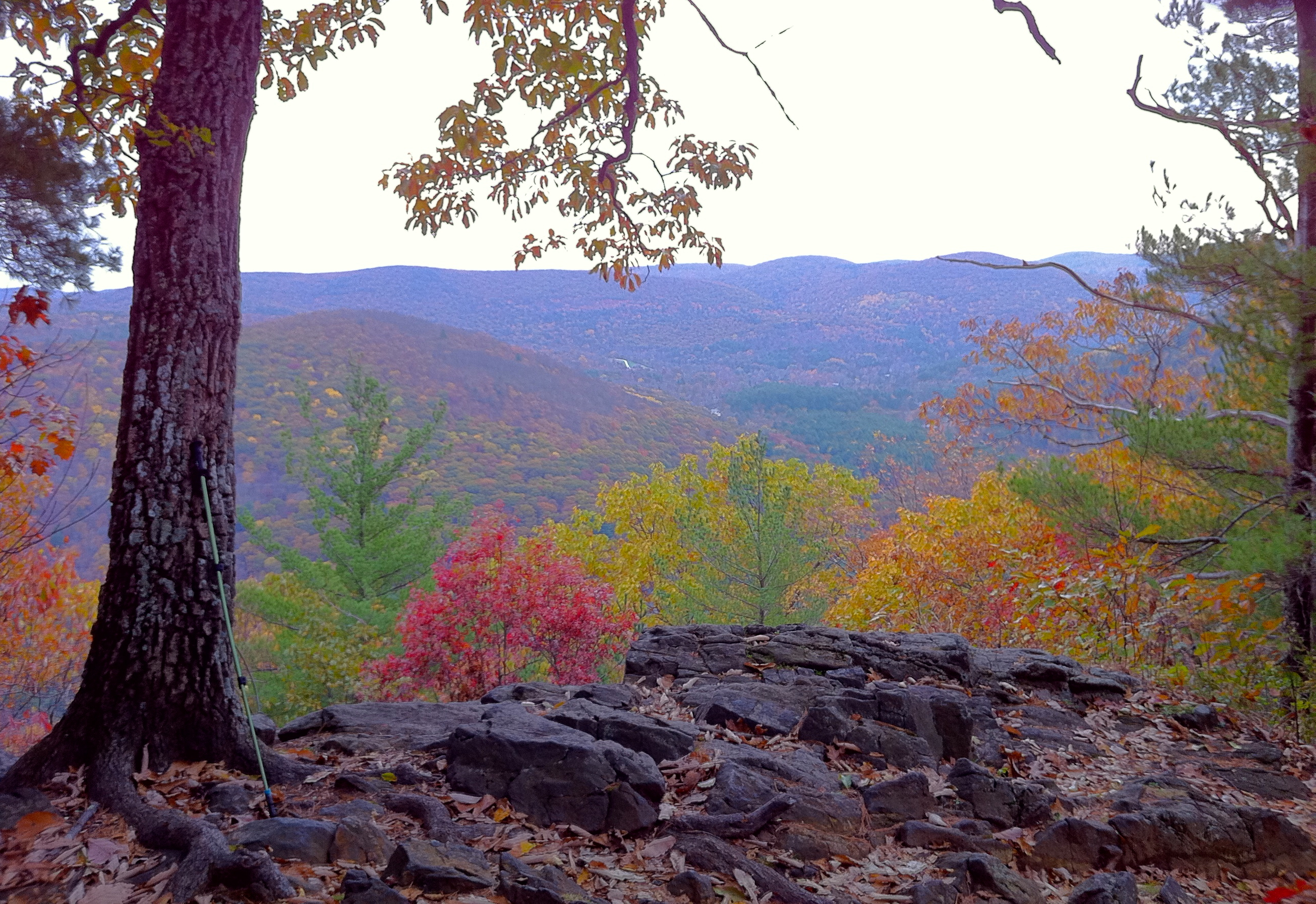
- Appalachian Trail's Pine Knob Loop Trail overlooking the Housatonic River Valley in Housatonic Meadows State Park

- Location within Connecticut Location within the United States
- Location: Cornwall and Sharon, Connecticut, United States
- Coordinates: 41°49′59″N 73°22′58″W
- Area: 452 acres (183 ha)
- Elevation: 446 ft (136 m)
- Established: 1927
- Administrator: Connecticut Department of Energy and Environmental Protection
- Designation: Connecticut state park
- Website: Official website

Housatonic Meadows State Park is a public recreation area covering 452 acres (183 ha) along the Housatonic River in the towns of Sharon and Cornwall, Connecticut. The state park offers opportunities for camping, hiking, picnicking, canoeing, and fly-fishing. It is crossed by the Appalachian Trail and is managed by the Connecticut Department of Energy and Environmental Protection.
