= Del Water Gap =

American musician and producer

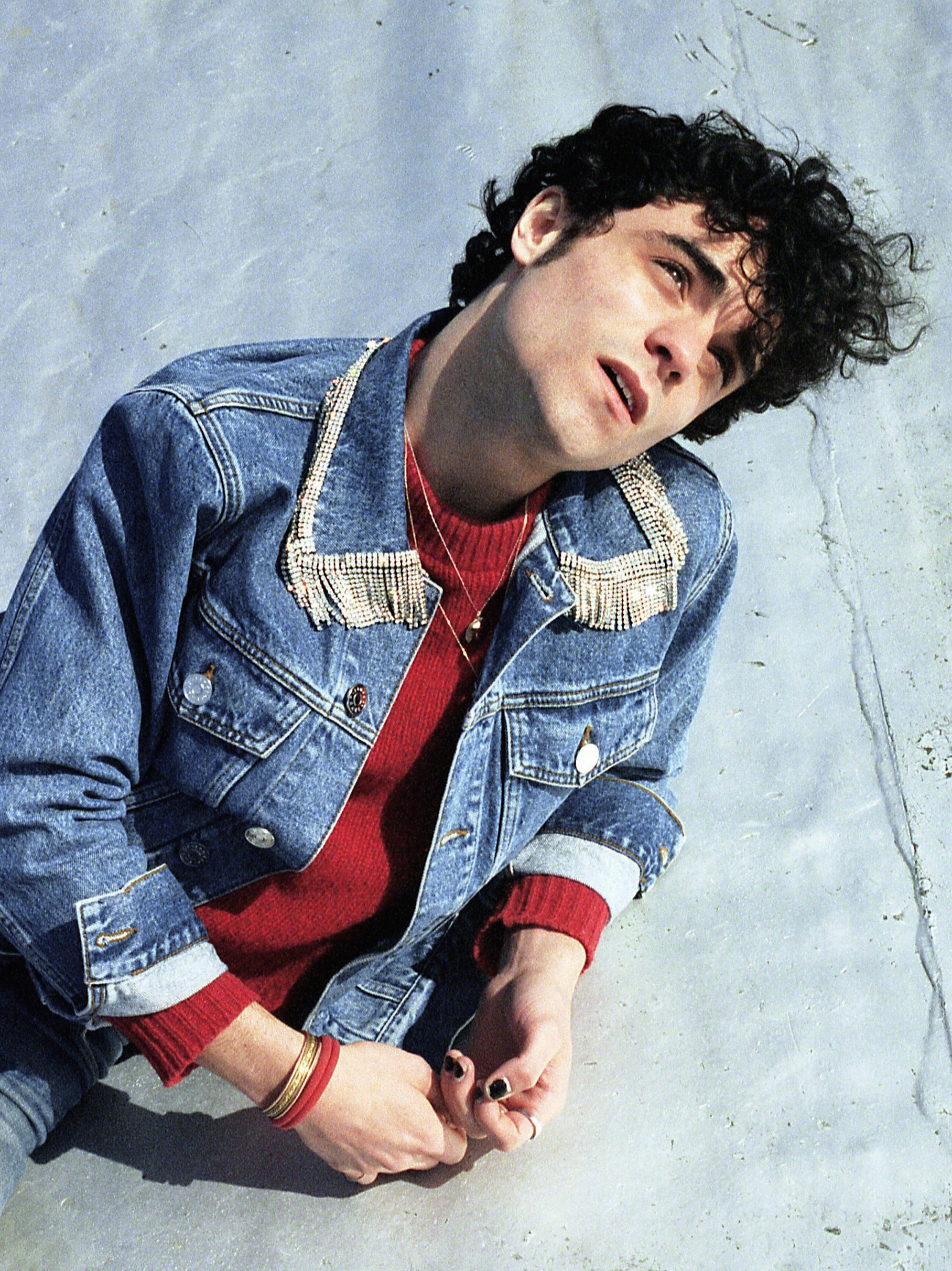
- Del Water Gap in 2020

Background information
- Also known as: S. Holden Jaffe
- Born: Samuel Holden Jaffe; April 15, 1993 (age 33)
- Origin: Brooklyn, New York, U.S.
- Genre: Indie pop
- Occupations: Singer-songwriter; record producer
- Instruments: Vocals; guitar; piano; drums; bass
- Years active: 2012–present
- Labels: Mom + Pop; Atlantic; Terrible
- Website: delwatergap.net

Samuel Holden Jaffe (born April 15, 1993), known as Del Water Gap, is an American musician and record producer from Sharon, Connecticut, now based in Brooklyn, New York. He has released three studio albums with Mom + Pop Music.

== Career ==
=== Inception and early career ===
Jaffe is from Sharon, Connecticut. He grew up "between two farms in the woods" listening to Bob Dylan and Randy Newman. His parents, Joshua Jaffe and Katharine Holden, are both doctors. His grandmother, the only other artist in the family, lived in Paris and also worked for the Metropolitan Opera for decades. When he was 12 years old, he attended a summer sailing camp in Maine with Maggie Rogers, where they sailed against each other.

He attended Millbrook School, a boarding school in Millbrook, New York but was not good at sports so he turned to music. He had played drums for 10 years. In his sophomore year in high school, age 16, his first girlfriend, a jazz musician and songwriter, inspired him to write music. He then participated in a music program at Berklee College of Music.

By the time he graduated high school in 2012, Jaffe recorded as Del Water Gap. The name, short for Delaware Water Gap, came about after Jaffe saw it handwritten on the back of a box truck in Sharpie at the age of 17, while driving around New Jersey. Jaffe was influenced by Bon Iver and Tallest Man on Earth, who used project names, saying:

"I liked the removal that gave the artist. It just seemed like it had this sort of mystery or maybe some safety, and more room to build a world. So, I decided to take on that name rather than using my name."

At the time of the project's inception, Jaffe was playing drums in a noise rock band in which "they wouldn’t really let me sing."

When he was 18, he moved to New York City to attend the Clive Davis Institute of Recorded Music at New York University and study music and sound production with the goal of becoming a sound engineer. He played in several bands as he entered college. He met a manager who encouraged him to take recording music seriously and booked him for a show. He then assembled a band, which he said was easier to do in New York.

He once again connected with Maggie Rogers, a classmate. Rogers played in the first incarnation of Del Water Gap for six months. After two of the people he had started the project with dropped out, Jaffe took on Del Water Gap as a solo project.

In May 2012, he released his first EP, Del Water Gap EP. He released another EP, Sleeping, in May 2014.

He independently released the EP 1 (646) 943 2672 in March 2017; it was named after the number for a burner phone he encouraged fans to call, which he answered personally.

In November 2018, Jaffe released the single "Laid Down My Arms" on Terrible Records.

In 2019, he released the singles "Chastain" and "Theory of Emotion" ahead of his third EP, Don't Get Dark, also on Terrible Records.

He released the EP Alive From Fresno, which included seven tracks recorded live, in November 2019, h.

=== 2020–2024: "Ode to a Conversation Stuck in Your Throat" and mainstream success ===
In May 2020, during the COVID-19 pandemic, Del Water Gap released "Ode to a Conversation Stuck in Your Throat" and "Mariposa" on Atlantic Records. In July 2020, the song gained widespread attention after actresses Margaret Qualley and Kaitlyn Dever posted a video of themselves performing a "socially distant dance party" to the song on Instagram. At the time, Jaffe had been considering quitting music to become a Certified Public Accountant after parting ways with his management and record label and cancelling a tour due to the pandemic. In December 2024, "Ode to a Conversation Stuck in Your Throat" was certified gold by the Recording Industry Association of America for 500,000 sales.

Also in 2020, Maggie Rogers released "New Song", recorded with Jaffe in 2014, as part of her compilation album Notes from the Archive: Recordings 2011–2016.

Jaffe collaborated with Rogers on her second album, Surrender (2022), co-writing and producing the singles "Want Want" and "Anywhere With You" alongside Rogers and Kid Harpoon. He also worked with Claud on the single "My Body" and co-wrote and produced Claud's "Never Meant to Call".

In 2021, Jaffe released his debut LP Del Water Gap on Mom + Pop Music. He toured internationally to support the album.

In 2023, Jaffe released the album I Miss You Already + I Haven’t Left Yet. The recording process took approximately 18 months and 40 studio sessions. It features collaborations with Clairo and Arlo Parks. The album, his second release on Mom + Pop, debuted at number 97 on the Top Album Sales chart.

Jaffe was the opening act for Niall Horan's The Show: Live on Tour in June 2024. The tour included performances at Madison Square Garden in New York City, the Kia Forum in Los Angeles, and The O2 Arena in London.

In January 2024, he and Holly Humberstone released the single "Cigarettes & Wine".

=== 2025–present: Chasing the Chimera ===
Del Water Gap performing in Chicago in 2026

Jaffe played a set at Lollapalooza in July 2025.

Also in July 2025, Jaffe released his first solo single in two years, "How To Live".

In August 2025, he played the first leg of his AU / IE / UK tour, headlining in the UK and Ireland, including a sold out show at Outernet London. The same month, Jaffe released the single "Marigolds" and announced the upcoming release of his third studio album, Chasing the Chimera via Mom + Pop Music. The single "Damn" was released in October 2025.

Chasing The Chimera was released in November 2025, his third release on Mom + Pop Music. The album title is a reference to Italian director Alice Rohrwacher's 2023 film La chimera. Jaffe named the album following a conversation he had with actress Isabella Rossellini at the film club he runs with his 101-year-old grandmother, Patricia.

On December 20, 2025, Jaffe appeared as a special guest during a Jonas Brothers concert on their Jonas20: Greetings from Your Hometown Tour at the CFG Bank Arena, singing his single "How to Live".

== Logo ==
Del Water Gap's logo is a drawing of anthropomorphic horse named "Horse with Bowl Cut" that he drew on a napkin at The Hungarian Pastry Shop in New York City in 2019.

A neon sign of "Horse with Bowl Cut" which was gifted to Jaffe by his label tours with him.

== Performances ==
=== Tours ===
==== Headliner ====
- Chasing The Chimera World Tour (2026)
- AU / IE / UK Tour (2025)
- I Miss You Already + I Haven't Left Yet On Tour - UK + Europe (2024)
- I Miss You Already + I Haven't Left Yet On Tour - North America (2023)
- Del Water Gap - UK + Europe Tour (2022)
- Del Water Gap - North America Tour (2021, 2022)

==== Opening act ====
- Halsey - For My Last Trick Tour (May - July 2025)
- Niall Horan – The Show: Live on Tour (2024)
- Maggie Rogers - Feral Joy Tour (13 shows in February & March 2023)
- Arlo Parks - Collapsed in Sunbeams Tour (September 2022)
- Girl in Red - Make It Go Quiet Tour (April & May 2022)
- Jeremy Zucker - MORE NOISE !!! (October 2021)
- Holly Humberstone - Live at the Roxy Theatre (1 show in 2021)
- Mt. Joy (1 show in 2021 at Red Rocks Amphitheatre)
- Gracie Abrams - The Look at My Life Tour (January and February 2027)

=== Festivals ===
- Noah Kahan's Out of the Blue Festival (2027)
- All Things Go DC (2026)
- Reading and Leeds (2025)
- Lollapalooza (2025)
- Corona Capital (2024)
- All Things Go (2024)
- Shaky Knees Music Festival (2024)
- Newport Folk Festival (2023)
- Austin City Limits (2023)
- Splendour in the Grass (2023)
- Governors Ball Music Festival (2022)
- Lollapalooza (2022)
- Outside Lands (2022)
- All Things Go Fall Classic (2021)
- Firefly Music Festival (2021)

=== Television ===
- Late Night with Seth Meyers – January 26, 2022

== Discography ==
=== Studio albums ===
Title	Details
Del Water Gap	Released: October 8, 2021; Label: Mom + Pop Music; Format: Digital download, streaming, cassette, LP
I Miss You Already + I Haven't Left Yet	Release date: September 29, 2023; Label: Mom + Pop Music; Format: Digital download, streaming, LP
Chasing the Chimera	Release date: November 7, 2025; Label: Mom + Pop Music; Format: Digital download, streaming, LP

=== Extended plays ===
Title	Details
Alive from Fresno	Released: November 22, 2019; Label: Terrible Records; Format: Digital download, streaming
Don't Get Dark	Released: April 12, 2019; Label: Terrible Records; Format: Digital download, streaming, LP, CD
1 (646) 943 2672 (Extended Play)	Released: March 10, 2017; Label: Self-released; Format: Digital download, streaming, CD
Sleeping (Extended Play)	Released: May 2, 2014; Label: Self-released; Format: Digital download, streaming, CD
Del Water Gap EP	Released: May 18, 2012; Label: Self-released; Format: Digital download, streaming, CD

=== Singles ===
==== As lead artist ====
Title	Year	Certifications	Album
"Ode to a Conversation Stuck in Your Throat"	2020	RIAA: Gold	Del Water Gap
"Mariposa"	2020		non-album single
"Alone Together"	2021		Del Water Gap
"Perfume"	2021		Del Water Gap
"Better Than I Know Myself"	2021		Del Water Gap
"Hurting Kind"	2021		Del Water Gap
"Sorry I Am"	2021		Del Water Gap
"NFU"	2023		I Miss You Already + I Haven't Left Yet
"Coping on Unemployment"	2023		I Miss You Already + I Haven't Left Yet
"Quilt of Steam" (featuring Arlo Parks)	2023		I Miss You Already + I Haven't Left Yet
"Losing You"	2023		I Miss You Already + I Haven't Left Yet
"All We Ever Do Is Talk"	2023		I Miss You Already + I Haven't Left Yet
"Cigarettes & Wine" (featuring Holly Humberstone)	2024		I Miss You Already + I Haven't Left Yet
"How To Live"	2025		Chasing the Chimera
"Marigolds"	2025		Chasing the Chimera
"Damn"	2025		Chasing the Chimera

==== As featured artist ====
Title	Year	Album
"New Song" (Maggie Rogers and Del Water Gap)	2020	Notes from the Archive: Recordings 2011-2016
"(Does It Feel Slow?)" (Maggie Rogers and Del Water Gap)	2020	Notes from the Archive: Recordings 2011-2016
"My Body" (Claud and Del Water Gap)	2020	Non-album single

=== Songwriting and production credits ===
Year	Song	Artist	Album	Details
2022	"everything i hate about you"	Johnny Orlando	all the things that could go wrong	Producer/songwriter
2022	"Anywhere with You"	Maggie Rogers	Surrender	Producer/songwriter
2022	"Want Want"	Maggie Rogers	Surrender	Producer/songwriter
2021	"Thief"	Ella Jane	THIS IS NOT WHAT IT LOOKS LIKE!	Producer
2021	"Peachi"	Chloe George	Non-album single	Producer
2021	"Something to Miss"	Kristiane	I Miss Myself, Sometimes	Producer
2021	"life sentence"	Zachary Knowles	tendency to be a loner	Producer/songwriter
2020	"Japanese Posters"	Rebounder	Subway Songs	Songwriter
2018	"Never Meant to Call"	Claud	Non-album single	Producer/songwriter

=== Music videos ===
Title	Year	Director
"Marigolds"	2025	Kevin Lombardo
"All We Ever Do Is Talk"	2023	Talia Ryder
"Perfume"	2021	S. Holden Jaffe and Charlie Plummer
"Hurting Kind"	2021	S. Holden Jaffe and Charlie Plummer
"Sorry I Am"	2021	S. Holden Jaffe and Angela Ricciardi
"Ode to a Conversation Stuck in Your Throat"	2020	S. Holden Jaffe
"My Body" (Claud and Del Water Gap)	2020	S. Holden Jaffe and Claud Mintz
"Theory of Emotion"	2019	Dillon Moore
"Laid Down My Arms"	2018	Dillon Moore
