= Light On (Maggie Rogers song) =

Single by Maggie Rogers

from the album Heard It in a Past Life
- Released: October 10, 2018
- Genre: Alternative rock; synth-pop
- Length: 3:53
- Label: Debay; Capitol
- Songwriters: Maggie Rogers; Thomas Hull
- Producers: Greg Kurstin; Kid Harpoon; Maggie Rogers

Maggie Rogers singles chronology
| "Give a Little" (2018) | "Light On" (2018) | "Burning" (2019) |

Music video
- "Light On" on YouTube

"Light On" is a song by American singer and songwriter Maggie Rogers. It was released on October 10, 2018 as the fifth single of Rogers' major-label debut studio album, Heard It in a Past Life (2019). Rogers co-wrote the song with Kid Harpoon and both co-produced it with Greg Kurstin.

== Background ==
Announcing the song release, she revealed that the track was about "gratitude". "it’s the most vulnerable ive ever felt in a song" [sic], she tweeted. In an interview with Billboard, Rogers revealed that the song was about "feeling out of control". She recalled, "There's always a part of it that has to feel like work or something that's not entirely you".

During an interview with Zane Lowe on Apple Music's Beats 1 on October 10, 2018, Rogers said,

This was the final song I wrote for the record. [...] I wrote this record which captures all those feelings of being overwhelmed and being uncertain. I realized the one story I hadn’t written was about all of the joy. I really wanted to say thank you to my fans, and write a letter to them to tell them what had happened and how much they meant to me. Because in all this time when I was really uncertain, I would get on stage every night, and be so certain. It was never the music I was unsure about, it was everything else around it that I found overwhelming.

== Critical reception ==
Meredith Nardino of Atwood Magazine said that "...Rogers is laying her whole heart on the table, bringing us backstage to some of the most challenging moments of her creative life." Upon reviewing for the associated album, Clash called it as the "stand out track" of the album, commented: "['Light On' is] where infectious energy and choppy beats are enough to bob Rogers’ characteristically peppy vocals over some of the prettiest melody you are likely to hear this year." Writing for Variety, Chris Willman said the track "gets passionate about feeling strangely passionless."

== Live performances ==
On November 3, 2018, Rogers performed the song during her appearance on the forty-fourth season of Saturday Night Live. The performance was met with a mixed response, with Bustle called it as "may not have been the best introduction". She performed it on Ellen on January 16, 2019. During her Heard It in a Past Life Tour stop at the O_{2} Academy, Brixton, England, she brought out lead vocalist Florence Welch of Florence and the Machine to perform the song. Rogers performed the track during her morning television debut set on Today Show on April 25, 2019.

== Personnel ==
- Maggie Rogers – vocals, production, percussion
- Chris Allgood – mastering engineer assistance
- Julian Burg – engineering
- Serban Ghenea – mixing
- John Hanes – mixing engineering
- Kid Harpoon – production, acoustic guitar, bass guitar, electric guitar, piano, drum programming
- Greg Kurstin – production, bass, drums, guitar, keyboards, piano, engineering
- Emily Lazar – mastering
- Alex Pasco – engineering

Credits adapted from Tidal.

== Track listings ==
- Digital download
5. "Light On" – 3:53
- Digital download – Winston Marshall Remix
1. "Light On" (Winston Marshall Remix) – 5:11

== Charts ==
| Chart (2018–2019) | Peak position |
|---|---|
| Australia (ARIA Hitseekers) | 4 |
| New Zealand Hot Singles (RMNZ) | 40 |
| US Adult Alternative Songs (Billboard) | 1 |
| US Adult Top 40 (Billboard) | 31 |
| US Alternative Digital Song Sales (Billboard) | 9 |
| US Dance Club Songs (Billboard) | 26 |
| US Rock Airplay (Billboard) | 35 |

== Certifications ==
| Region | Certification | Certified units/sales |
|---|---|---|
| Canada (Music Canada) | Gold | 40,000^{‡} |
| United Kingdom (BPI) | Silver | 200,000^{‡} |
| United States (RIAA) | Gold | 500,000^{‡} |
^{‡} Sales+streaming figures based on certification alone.
