= Sharon, Connecticut =

- Town
- Town of Sharon
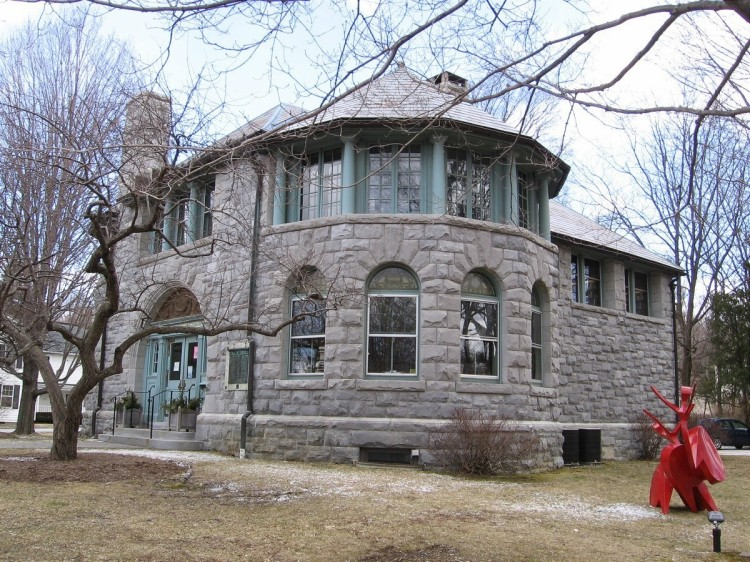
- Hotchkiss Memorial Library

- Seal

- Coordinates: 41°52′N 73°27′W
- Country: United States
- U.S. state: Connecticut
- County: Litchfield
- Region: Northwest Hills
- Incorporated: 1739
- Named for: Sharon plain

Government
  - Type: Selectman–town meeting
  - First selectman: Casey T. Flanagan (D)
  - Selectman: John Brett (I)
  - Selectman: Lynn Kearcher (D)

Area
  - Total: 59.6 sq mi (154.3 km^{2})
  - Land: 58.8 sq mi (152.2 km^{2})
  - Water: 0.81 sq mi (2.1 km^{2})
- Elevation: 1,135 ft (346 m)

Population (2020)
  - Total: 2,680
  - Density: 45.6/sq mi (17.6/km^{2})
- Time zone: UTC−5 (Eastern)
  - Summer (DST): UTC−4 (Eastern)
- ZIP Code: 06069
- Area codes: 860/959
- FIPS code: 09-005-67960
- GNIS feature ID: 213503
- Website: www.sharonct.gov

Sharon is a town in Litchfield County, Connecticut, United States, in the northwest corner of the state. At the time of the 2020 census, the town had a total population of 2,680. The town is part of the Northwest Hills Planning Region. The ZIP Code for Sharon is 06069. The urban center of the town is the Sharon census-designated place, with a population of 729 at the 2010 census.

== History ==
The first inhabitants of the area they called Poconnuck were the Mattabesec Native Americans. These were part of what became known as the Wappinger confederacy; in turn, it belonged to the loose Algonquian confederacy.

Sharon was incorporated in 1739. It is named after the Plain of Sharon.

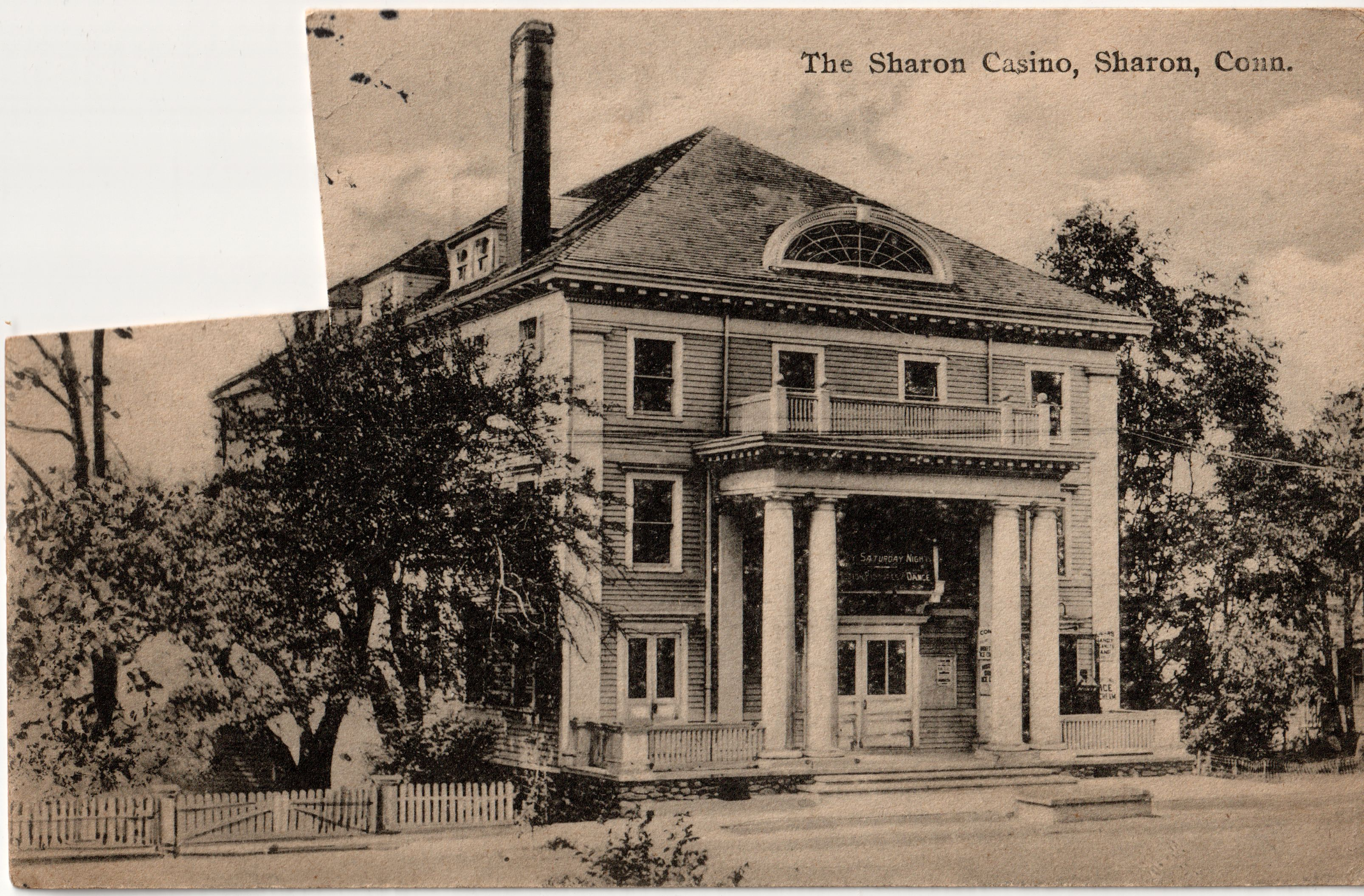
The Sharon Casino about 1906

The youth conservative organization Young Americans for Freedom was founded in Sharon in 1960 at the childhood home of founder William F. Buckley Jr., and the group's founding statement, the Sharon Statement, is named after the town.

=== Historic sites ===
Sharon has six sites listed on the U.S. National Register of Historic Places:

- Ebenezer Gay House, 18 Main Street, Sharon
- George King House, 12 North Main Street, Sharon
- Gov. Smith Homestead, South Main Street, Sharon
- James Pardee House, 129 North Main Street, Sharon
- Sharon Historic District, roughly Main Street from Low Road to its junction with Mitchelltown, Amenia Union, and West Woods Roads, Sharon
- Sharon Valley Historic District

== Arts and Culture ==
The Sharon Road Race is a 41 year tradition hosted at the veterans field, that consists of a 5.3 mile long footrace. All profits are given to the Sharon Center School Daycare.

A fine arts show is hosted on Main Street every year in August. The show is also presented in Millerton, New York. This festival is an opportunity to purchase and view art pieces made by the community.

The Sharon Audobon Center is a wildlife sanctuary of the National Audobon Society, known for hosting local events and its collection of free public nature trails.

The Sharon Town Beach is a staple of the community, offering a playground, swimming lanes, a changing pavilion and toy shed for all the locals and tourists to enjoy. The beach sits along Mudge Pond.

== Geography ==
The town is bounded on the north by Salisbury, on the east across the Housatonic River by Cornwall, on the south by Kent, and on the west by Dutchess County, New York. Sharon is 42 miles (68 km) north of Danbury, 52 miles (84 km) west of Hartford, and 30 miles (48 km) northeast of Poughkeepsie, New York.

According to the United States Census Bureau, the town has a total area of 59.6 square miles (154.3 km^{2}), of which 58.8 square miles (152.2 km^{2}) are land and 0.81 square miles (2.1 km^{2}), or 1.33%, are water. It is the third largest town in Connecticut based on area. Sharon is part of the Northwest Highlands of Connecticut, a region in and around the watershed of the Housatonic River. The Appalachian Trail passes for a few miles through the east side of Sharon, near West Cornwall and U.S. Route 7. Housatonic Meadows State Park is in the eastern part of the town, next to the Housatonic River.

=== Principal communities ===
- Amenia Union
- Ellsworth
- Sharon center
- Sharon Valley
- Main Street & Green
- Calkinstown
- West Woods
- Silver Lake Shores

==== Demographics ====
Historical population
Census	Pop.	Note	%±
1820	2,573		—
1850	2,507		—
1860	2,556		2.0%
1870	2,441		−4.5%
1880	2,580		5.7%
1890	2,149		−16.7%
1900	1,982		−7.8%
1910	1,880		−5.1%
1920	1,585		−15.7%
1930	1,710		7.9%
1940	1,611		−5.8%
1950	1,889		17.3%
1960	2,141		13.3%
1970	2,491		16.3%
1980	2,623		5.3%
1990	2,928		11.6%
2000	2,968		1.4%
2010	2,782		−6.3%
2020	2,680		−3.7%
U.S. Decennial Census

As of the census of 2000, there were 2,968 people, 1,246 households, and 775 families residing in the town. The population density was 50.6 inhabitants per square mile (19.5/km^{2}). There were 1,617 housing units at an average density of 27.5 per square mile (10.6/km^{2}). The racial makeup of the town was 96.87% White, 0.94% African American, 0.57% Asian, 0.44% Native American, 0% Pacific Islander, 0.34% from other races, and 0.84% from two or more races. Hispanic or Latino of any race were 1.95% of the population.

There were 1,246 households, of which 25.8% had children under the age of 18 living with them, 51.9% were married couples living together, 7.5% had a female householder with no husband present, and 37.8% were non-families. 31.1% of all households were made up of individuals, and 13.2% had someone living alone who was 65 years of age or older. The average household size was 2.26 and the average family size was 2.87.

In the town, the population was spread out, with 21.3% under the age of 18, 4.2% from 18 to 24, 24.4% from 25 to 44, 29.1% from 45 to 64, and 21.0% who were 65 years of age or older. The median age was 45 years. For every 100 females, there were 94.0 males. For every 100 females age 18 and over, there were 92.2 males.

The median household income was $53,000, and the median family income for a family was $71,458. Males had a median income of $42,841 versus $31,375 for females. The per capita income for the town was $45,418. About 3.9% of families and 7.2% of the population were below the poverty line, including 10.4% of those under the age of 18 and none of those 65 and older.

== Education ==
Sharon is a member of Regional School District 01, which also includes the towns of Canaan, Cornwall, Kent, North Canaan, and Salisbury. Public school students attend Sharon Center School from grades K–8 and Housatonic Valley Regional High School or Oliver Wolcott Technical High School from grades 9–12.

== Transportation ==
The town is served by state highways 4, 41, 343, and 361. Route 4 has its western terminus in Sharon and leads southeast 8 miles (13 km) to Cornwall Bridge and ultimately east 47 miles (76 km) to West Hartford. Route 41 leads north 8 miles (13 km) to Salisbury and southwest 4 miles (6 km) to the New York state line, Route 343 leads west and becomes New York State Route 343, leading 5 miles (8 km) to Amenia, New York, and Route 361 leads towards Millerton, New York, 6 miles (10 km) north of Sharon.

== Notable people ==
- Kevin Bacon (born 1958), and his wife Kyra Sedgwick (born 1965), actors
- Patricia Buckley Bozell (1927–2008), author and editor; reared in Sharon with her brothers James and William Jr. at the Buckley family home, "Great Elm"
- William F. Buckley Jr. (1925–2008), public intellectual, founder of National Review
- James L. Buckley (1925–2008), U.S. Senator from New York, federal judge, author.
- Yancy Butler (born 1970), former Witchblade actress
- William Coley (1862–1936), prominent New York bone surgeon and inventor of "Coley's toxins", an early form of cancer immunotherapy
- Jane Curtin (born 1947), actress and comedian
- Walter Fairservis, (1921-1994) Archeologist at American Museum of Natural History and finder of "lost cities". Also playwright and producer - lived in Sharon 25 years before his death.
- Michael J. Fox (born 1961) and his wife Tracy Pollan (born 1960), actors
- Frank R. Fratellenico (1951–1970), Medal of Honor recipient, Vietnam War
- Arthur Getz (1913–1996), illustrator for The New Yorker magazine
- Tom Goldenberg (born 1948), artist
- Eunice Groark (1938–2018), Lieutenant Governor of Connecticut
- Thomas Hart (1877–1971), U.S. Navy admiral and U.S. senator
- Benjamin B. Hotchkiss (1826–1885), ordnance engineer, husband of Maria Bissell Hotchkiss
- Maria Bissell Hotchkiss (1827–1901), educator, wife of Benjamin B. Hotchkiss
- S. Holden Jaffe, musician behind Del Water Gap
- Jasper Johns (born 1930), artist
- Elijah Juckett (1760–1839), Continental Army soldier
- John Lamb (born 1946), former Pittsburgh Pirates right-handed pitcher
- Helen Coley Nauts (1907–2001), daughter of William Coley and co-founder of the Cancer Research Institute
- Sam Posey (born 1944), retired racecar driver and sports broadcaster
- Campbell Scott (born 1961), actor
- Ansel Sterling (1782–1853), congressman from Connecticut
- Charles A. Templeton (1871–1955), Governor of Connecticut
- Bradley Whitford (born 1959) and his wife Jane Kaczmarek (born 1955), actors

=== Sharon Hospital, the birthplace of several persons who were not residents ===
- Philip Amelio, 1980s child actor born in Sharon on November 3, 1977; raised in nearby Pine Plains, New York
- Samuel Berger, U.S. National Security Advisor to President Bill Clinton, born in Sharon on October 28, 1945; raised in nearby Millerton, New York
- Michael Cole (born Michael Shawn Coulthard), announcer on WWE Raw and former CBS Radio journalist, born in Sharon on December 8, 1968; raised in nearby Amenia, New York
- Alfred Korzybski, founder of the nearby Institute of General Semantics, died at Sharon Hospital March 1, 1950
