= George King House =

Historic house in Connecticut, United States

- U.S. National Register of Historic Places
- U.S. Historic district – Contributing property
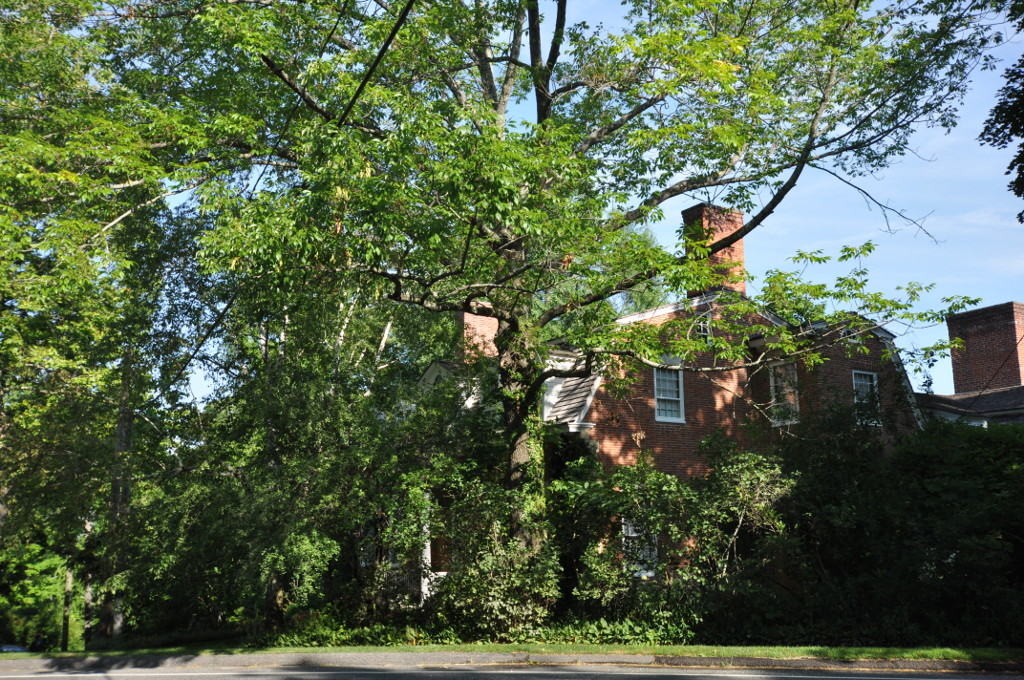

- Location within Connecticut Location within the United States
- Location: 12 North Main Street, Sharon, Connecticut
- Coordinates: 41°52′54″N 73°28′34″W
- Area: 12 acres (4.9 ha)
- Architect: Ford, Butler & Oliver
- Architectural style: Georgian, Colonial Revival
- Part of: Sharon Historic District (ID93000257)
- NRHP reference No.: 06000592

Significant dates
- Added to NRHP: November 6, 2006
- Designated CP: April 15, 1993

The George King House, also known locally as the King-Hart House is a historic house at 12 North Main Street in Sharon, Connecticut. Its oldest portion dating to 1769, this brick house is significant for its associations with George King, a prominent local businessman during the American Revolutionary War, and with Thomas C. Hart, a United States senator and Admiral in the United States Navy. The house was individually listed on the National Register of Historic Places in 2006; it had also been listed in 1993 as part of the Sharon Historic District.

== Description and history ==
The King House occupies a prominent position facing the narrow northern end of Sharon's long town green, at the point where Main Street bends eastward and begins North Main Street. It is set at the southern end of a 12-acre (4.9 ha) parcel that extends north all the way to Beardsley Brook. The main house is a two-story brick structure, with a gambrel roof pierced by a gabled dormers. Numerous ells and additions extend the house to the east and north; one of these is an older construction, while the others date to a major Colonial Revival expansion in the 1920s. Distinguishing features of the exterior include limestone corner quoining and splayed window lintels. The interior, following a center-hall plan, retains many original features, including a fine central staircase.

The oldest portion of the house is one of its ells, which was built in 1769. This was purchased in 1783 by George King, a prominent local businessman who had acted as an army commissary during the American Revolutionary War. The house remained in the King family until 1906, and was brought back into the family by Caroline Brownson Hart, a great-great granddaughter of King, who was the wife of Admiral Thomas C. Hart. The Harts made a major expansion of the building in 1925. Hart, whose naval career began in the Spanish–American War, played an influential role in the development of the United States Navy's submarine fleet, and served briefly as an interim United States Senator.

== See also ==
- National Register of Historic Places listings in Litchfield County, Connecticut
