= Tom Goldenberg =

American painter

- Born: 1948 (age 77–78); Evergreen Park, Illinois, US
- Education: University of Illinois, Urbana-Champaign
- Known for: Painting, drawing, landscapes, abstraction
- Style: Modernist
- Website: Tom Goldenberg

Tom Goldenberg (born 1948) is an American artist, best known for landscape and abstract paintings. He has shown throughout the United States and internationally, and his work has been covered by The New York Times, The New Criterion, Art in America, Arts Magazine, Art & Antiques, and The New York Observer, among other publications. Critics often note his landscape works for their contemporary interplay of stylization and observation and concern for form over verisimilitude, pointing to his beginnings in abstraction as a foundation that underlies his ordered pictorial structures. In the later 2010s, Goldenberg has returned to abstraction that sometimes suggests interior or "fictive" landscapes. The New Criterion editor and writer Roger Kimball described his paintings as leading "double lives, as memorable evocations of rural landscape and tightly organized arrangements of abstract planes of color." Hilton Kramer characterized his work as "deeply mediated by aesthetic reflection" and classical rather than romantic in feeling. Goldenberg and his wife, Michelle Alfandari, have lived in Sharon, Connecticut since 2016, after being based in New York City since the 1970s.

Tom Goldenberg, Grandview, oil on linen, 78" x 96", 2003

== Life and career ==
Goldenberg was born in 1948 in Evergreen Park, Illinois, a suburb just south of Chicago. He attended the University of Illinois at Urbana–Champaign (BFA, 1970) and moved to New York City in 1973, taking a loft in Soho. His first solo exhibition there was at the Sarah Y. Rentschler Gallery in 1978; he has since then shown throughout the United States, at the George Billis Gallery, Danese, Salander-O'Reilly Galleries (1983–2004) and City University (CUNY) in New York, Hokin Gallery (Chicago), Watson de Nagy & Co. (Houston), and Swope Gallery (Venice, CA), among others. He has also been featured in group exhibitions at the Aldrich Museum of Contemporary Art and the Krannert Art Museum. His work belongs to numerous corporate collections and those of CUNY, Bucknell University and the Ringling Museum. In addition to his exhibited work, he created the art for the cover of poet Tony Towle's 2018 collection, Noir, and drawings for poems by David Yezzi for an art/poetry show in 2012.

Goldenberg is a Professional Fellow at the Morgan Library and has taught at the Art Students League, The New School and the New York Studio School. In 2001, he designed a course about seeing and appreciating Master Drawings through The New School, called "Drawing on Collections," which he taught independently and through various institutions until 2014 (see below). In 2019 and 2020, he has been recognized by the Visiting Artist and Scholar Program at the American Academy in Rome.

== Artwork and reception ==
Critics characterize Goldenberg's command of color, light and structure and his economy of expression as keys to his art; several suggest that they derive, in part, from an idiosyncratic process that combines old-world painting techniques with modern technology. Goldenberg paints exclusively with handmade, natural pigments that he grinds himself on roughened glass in order to insure desired levels of viscosity and high color saturation. He began using digital photography as a stimulus to his imagination and preparatory studies in 1998, dividing the photos into grids from which he sketched discrete sections of paintings later worked up as layers of abstract shapes and tones, and finally, as more recognizable landscape elements. Critic Robert Messenger notes a resulting "Cubist sensibility that shines through in places," while New Criterion editor James Panero described the combination of observation and stylization as "abstraction and empathy at work, landscape like fireworks."

Tom Goldenberg, Gallatin, oil on linen, 78" x 96", 2010

=== Early work (1974–1998) ===
Goldenberg began his career in the 1970s as a figurative sculptor of detailed, epoxy-resin works. He turning to abstract painting—between roughly 1974–1983—influenced by artists such as Clyfford Still and Richard Diebenkorn, which largely consisted of painterly fields and architecturally ordered, rectangular areas of color. In 1980, Art in America noted this work for its lush surfaces, delicate coloration, and emotion checked by a "cool intelligence" reminiscent of Jasper Johns. After first-hand encounters in Europe in the early 1980s with masters such as Titian and Breughel, Goldenberg deemed abstraction a limitation. He responded with the expressive "Vines" series (1983–6), followed by several still life series depicting glasses, bowls and table tops (1986–7; 1997–8) and the "Grids" series (1990–6), which combined largely square grid patterns with floating, stylized representational imagery (foliage, bottles, glasses) and abstract passages of color (e.g., Yellow Racer, 1990).

=== Contemporary landscapes (1998–2012) ===
In the late 1990s, Goldenberg turned to landscapes derived from the woodlands, rolling hills and farms of Dutchess County, New York, which culminated in a 1999 show that critic Hilton Kramer wrote, put him on the map as "one of the leading landscape painters of his generation." Kramer particularly admired as "virtuosic" the pictorial dialogue between the depicted, richly variegated terrain and its distorted reflection in water landscapes such as Pond and Brook (both 2000). Others noted, in works such as the large-scale Grandview (2004), the patchwork compositional play, evocative multi-chromatic palettes, dramatic brushwork, and sense of light. Mario Naves described that painting's "deceptively straightforward depiction of farmland [as] in reality, a fairly intricate not to say abstract orchestration of space, rhythm and incident." In 2002, Goldenberg traveled to Porto Santo Stefano on the Tyrrhenian Sea, to paint a new environment. Critics considered the dark nocturnes, tightly cropped, tangled foliage and wild-running gardens of these works (which some compared to Rousseau and Bonnard) a departure, but nonetheless, highlighted works such as Cactus (2004) for their unexpected perspectives and diverse textural depictions.

Tom Goldenberg, Sandro's Hill, oil on linen, 56" x 74", 2014

In 2010, Goldenberg created his "Central Park Cherry" series of compressed charcoal, walnut ink and pastel drawings. It was also a departure from his more reflective landscapes in its limited palette, expressive Japanese-brush-like line, and imagery extracted from the natural context and set against the stark white of the paper. Mario Naves wrote that the scrabbled surfaces of the drawings and paintings such as Gallatin (2010) achieve a synthesis of art and nature "that is simultaneously hard-won and effortless, long sought after and utterly organic"; he compared what he called their complex, unruly world "dense with bone, grit and muscle" to that of New York School artists such as Jackson Pollock.

Tom Goldenberg, Journal, oil on linen, 60" x 50", 2019

=== Later work and abstraction ===
Goldenberg's later drawings and paintings display an increasing level of abstraction, with mark-making that often disintegrates at the point of recognition, creating what some writers have called "fictive landscapes." Critic James Panero described his 2014 landscapes as "drawn canvases, with layered sketches on a pulpy painted ground" that bordered on unfinished, but in works such as Sandro's Hill (2014), creates a layering of impressions that conveys "both an image and the sense of an image." In 2017, Goldenberg worked on-site at the Re Institute for several months, with the neighboring Taconic Range landscape serving as his subject. The final exhibited drawings and tonal paintings echoed the landscape's scope and drastic foreshortening with its contrasting foreground marks and linear furrow lines receding into the horizon.

Goldenberg has subsequently returned to complete abstraction in late works derived from landscape and architectural space, which reference Josef Albers's "Homage to the Square" series formally, and explore the passing of time, the orchestration of daily life, and the transitory nature of existence. Writers have observed in these new paintings, such as Journal (2019), suggestions of "interior landscapes" reminiscent of ancient ritual sites (an influence that Goldenberg has acknowledged, based on travels to Israel, Greece and Macedonia) or architectural schematics.

== "Drawing on Collections" course (2001–14) ==
In 2001, Goldenberg designed a course about seeing and appreciating Master Drawings through The New School, called "Drawing on Collections", which he taught independently and at the Drawing Study Centers of the Morgan Library, the Museum of Modern Art, Metropolitan Museum of Art, Hispanic Society of America, Brooklyn Museum and private collections in New York City. The course conducted close study—sometimes under magnifying glass—and discussions of hand-selected drawings brought out from behind glass from different museum or private collections.
