= Sharon Historic District (Sharon, Connecticut) =

Historic district in Connecticut, United States

- U.S. National Register of Historic Places
- U.S. Historic district
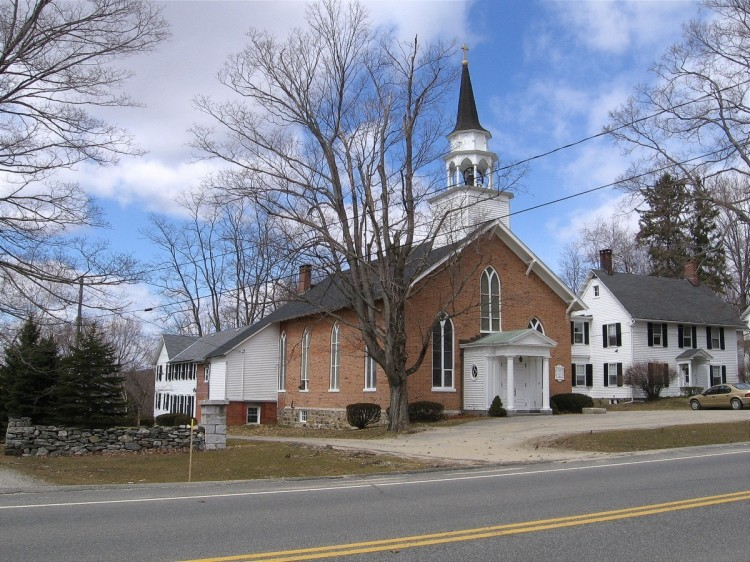
- Episcopal Church in Sharon

- Location within Connecticut Location within the United States
- Location: Roughly, Main Street from Low Road to Junction with Mitchelltown, Amenia Union and West Woods Roads, Sharon, Connecticut
- Area: 360 acres (150 ha)
- Architect: Price, Bruce; Rich, Charles A.
- Architectural style: Colonial Revival, Greek Revival, Federal
- NRHP reference No.: 93000257
- Added to NRHP: April 15, 1993

The Sharon Historic District encompasses the historic civic center of Sharon, Connecticut. Centered around a mile-long town green are an array of public civic and religious buildings, as well as residences from the 18th to 20th centuries. The area south of the green on South Main Street is lined with country houses developed or improved in the late 19th and early 20th centuries, representing one of the highest concentrations of Colonial Revival estates in the state. The district was listed on the National Register of Historic Places in 1993.

== Description and history ==
The town of Sharon was founded in 1739, and developed economically as a crossroads town, with its greatest period of economic prosperity in the early 19th century. This resulted in a preponderance of Federal period architecture lining the town's long green, which originally extended north and south from the junction of Main Street and the Cornwall Bridge and Amenia Roads. Although the village was bypassed by railroads, it benefited economically in the 19th century from the presence of iron mines and furnaces. By the 1880s, these industries were in decline, but the tourist trade was picking up. The southern portion of the green was essentially taken over by large country estates, many either new Colonial Revival construction or significant alteration of older buildings. The flanks of the northern portion of the green continued to be filled in with Victorian houses and new civic architecture.

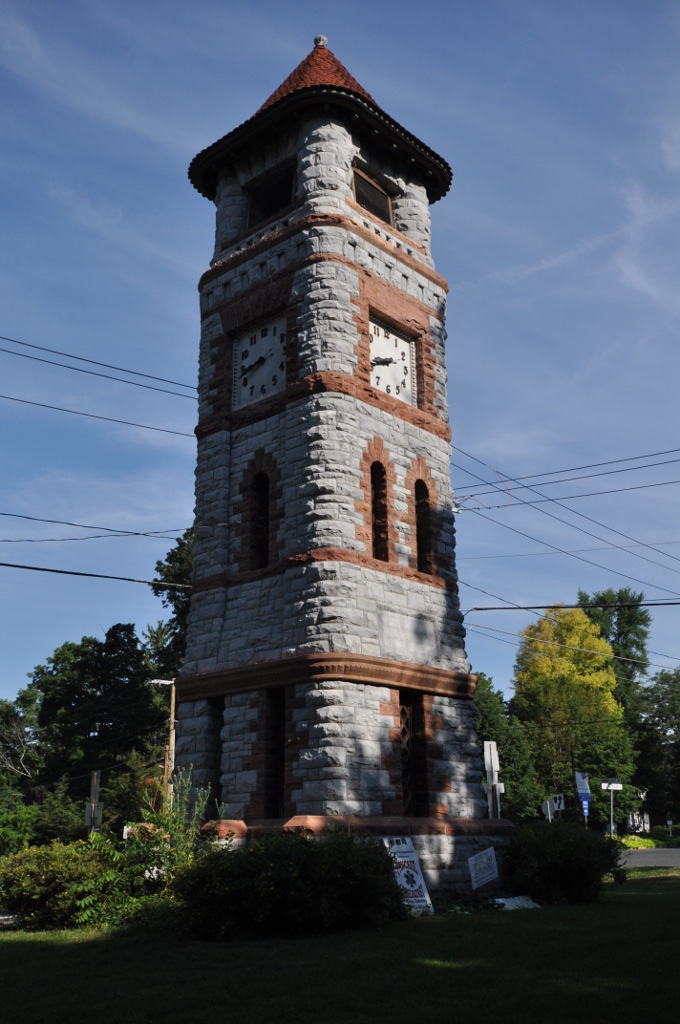
The memorial clock tower

The historic district is an essentially linear district, several miles long, centered on the junction of Cornwall Bridge and Amenia Roads with Main Street. It extends south to the junction of South Main Street with Mitchelltown and Amenia-Union Roads, and north to Low Street. Most of the district elements lie on Main Street, but some face adjoining streets. Architecturally prominent are four church buildings, the 1893 Romanesque library, and the memorial clock tower located southeast of the main junction. Buildings separately listed on the National Register include the brick Ebenezer Gay House, now the historical society museum, the George King House, and the James Pardee House.

== See also ==
- National Register of Historic Places listings in Litchfield County, Connecticut
