= Don't Forget Me (album) =

Studio album by Maggie Rogers
- Released: April 12, 2024
- Studio: Electric Lady, New York City
- Genre: Pop rock; soft rock; country; psychedelic rock
- Length: 35:49
- Label: Debay Sounds; Capitol

Maggie Rogers chronology
Surrender (2022)	Don't Forget Me (2024)

Singles from Don't Forget Me
- 1. "Don't Forget Me" Released: February 8, 2024; 2. "So Sick of Dreaming" Released: March 19, 2024

Don't Forget Me is the third studio album by American indie pop singer-songwriter Maggie Rogers. It was released on April 12, 2024, through Debay Sounds and Capitol Records.

== Background ==
Rogers first performed songs from the record at tour stops on her 2023 tour supporting her second studio album, Surrender (2022). Rogers co-produced the album herself with additional assistance from Ian Fitchuk at the Electric Lady Studios in New York City. The singer-songwriter wrote eight of the ten songs with Fitchuk, while two are entirely self-penned. In a letter, she announced her goal to have been the creation of a record that was akin to a "Sunday afternoon".

On January 1, 2024, she previewed a snippet of a song titled "Don't Forget Me" with a caption saying "see you in 2024". The eponymous lead single was then released alongside the album announcement on February 8, 2024. To Rogers, the song signifies a "rough journal entry" about attending festivities from friends while she craves "simple baselines" and finds herself "in a different place in [her] life".

== Reception ==
Professional ratings
Aggregate scores
Source	Rating
AnyDecentMusic?	7.9/10
Metacritic	84/100
Review scores
Source	Rating
AllMusic	4/5 stars
ClashMusic.com	8/10
Exclaim!	8/10
The Independent	4/5 stars
The Line of Best Fit	8/10
NME	4/5 stars
Paste	8.2/10
Pitchfork	7.8/10
Spin	A−

Don't Forget Me released to critical acclaim. Metacritic, which assigns a normalized rating out of 100 to reviews from mainstream critics, awarded the album an average score of 84 based on 16 critical reviews, indicating "universal acclaim". Aggregator AnyDecentMusic? gave the album a 7.9 out of 10 based on their collected reviews.

== Track listing ==
All tracks are written by Rogers and Ian Fitchuk, except "If Now Was Then" and "I Still Do", which were solely written by Rogers.

Don't Forget Me track listing
No.	Title	Length
1.	"It Was Coming All Along"	3:27
2.	"Drunk"	3:24
3.	"So Sick of Dreaming"	3:52
4.	"The Kill"	4:11
5.	"If Now Was Then"	3:04
6.	"I Still Do"	3:35
7.	"On & On & On"	2:34
8.	"Never Going Home"	3:30
9.	"All the Same"	3:47
10.	"Don't Forget Me"	4:25
Total length:		35:49

== Personnel ==
Musicians

- Maggie Rogers – lead vocals (all tracks), keyboards (tracks 1, 4, 5), bass (1), piano (6)
- Ian Fitchuk – bass (all tracks), acoustic guitar (tracks 1–5, 7–10), drums (1, 2, 4, 5, 7, 8), electric guitar (1–5, 7, 8, 10), keyboards (1–5, 7, 8, 10), piano (3, 9, 10), percussion (3, 10)
- Sam Evian – electric guitar (tracks 1, 8)
- Nora Neil – vocals (track 1)
- Isadore Blue Lovett – voice (track 1)

Technical

- Maggie Rogers – production
- Ian Fitchuk – production
- Emily Lazar – mastering
- Shawn Everett – mixing
- Konrad Snyder – engineering
- Carl Bespolka – engineering (tracks 1–6)
- John Rooney – engineering (tracks 7–10)
- Josh Moore – editing
- Ian Gold – mixing assistance
- Lauren Marquer – engineering assistance
- Michael Dean – engineering assistance
- Dani Perez – engineering assistance (tracks 1–6)
- Jack Manning – engineering assistance (tracks 7–10)

== Charts ==
Chart performance for Don't Forget Me
Chart (2024)	Peak position
Belgian Albums (Ultratop Flanders)	198
Scottish Albums (OCC)	10
UK Albums (OCC)	12
UK Americana Albums (OCC)	4
US Billboard 200	48
US Americana/Folk Albums (Billboard)	6
US Top Rock & Alternative Albums (Billboard)	12
