= James Pardee House =

Historic house in Connecticut, United States

- U.S. National Register of Historic Places
- U.S. Historic district – Contributing property
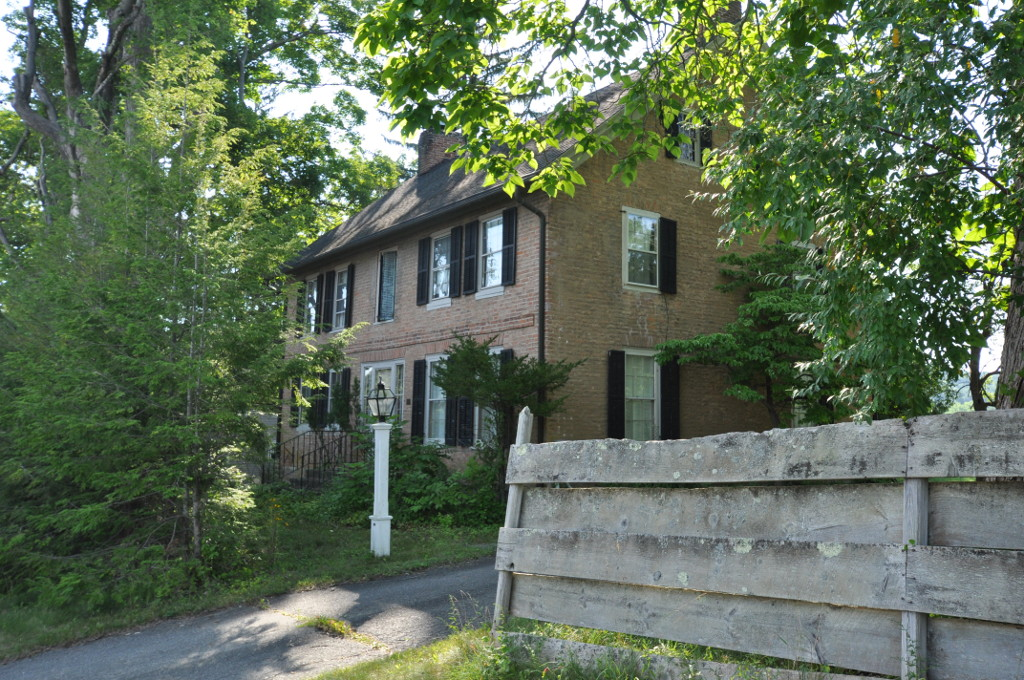

- Location within Connecticut Location within the United States
- Location: 129 North Main Street, Sharon, Connecticut
- Coordinates: 41.8831°N 73.4724°W
- Area: 6 acres (2.4 ha)
- Part of: Sharon Historic District (ID93000257)
- NRHP reference No.: 03000813

Significant dates
- Added to NRHP: August 28, 2003
- Designated CP: April 15, 1993

The James Pardee House, situated on the grounds of the John Pardee Homestead at 129 North Main Street, is one of the well-known historic homes built in the eighteenth century in the town of Sharon, Connecticut, according to the 1935 edition of The Connecticut Guide. Constructed in 1782 of locally produced salmon-colored brick, the Pardee House retains much of its original character and represents a significant and well-preserved vernacular expression of the late Georgian style in architecture, materials and workmanship in the State of Connecticut.

The Pardee House has been listed on the National Register of Historic Places as a contributing structure in the Sharon Historic District, and received its own separate listing as well in 2003. The two-story, five-bay, brick structure with a center-hall plan was constructed by James Pardee, the son of John Pardee, one of the founders of the Town of Sharon, on the town's original Proprietor Home Lot #29.

According to SPNEA documentation, the Pardee House is very well preserved at the exterior, which includes the retention of most of the building's original sash windows. At the interior of the Pardee House, numerous original and early features are preserved, including unusual structural framing, hand-carved woodwork, plaster on split lath, softwood floorboards and fireplaces. Located north of the Pardee House on the grounds of the original John Pardee Homestead is a ca. 1960 guest cottage. The open space of the Pardee Homestead retains its rural characteristics and consists primarily of lawn, gardens and a large open field located East of the house.

In 2002, the Boston-based Society for the Preservation of New England Antiquities (SPNEA, now Historic New England) acquired a preservation restriction on the property in perpetuity.

== See also ==
- National Register of Historic Places listings in Litchfield County, Connecticut
