= Ebenezer Gay House =

Historic house in Connecticut, United States

- U.S. National Register of Historic Places
- U.S. Historic district – Contributing property
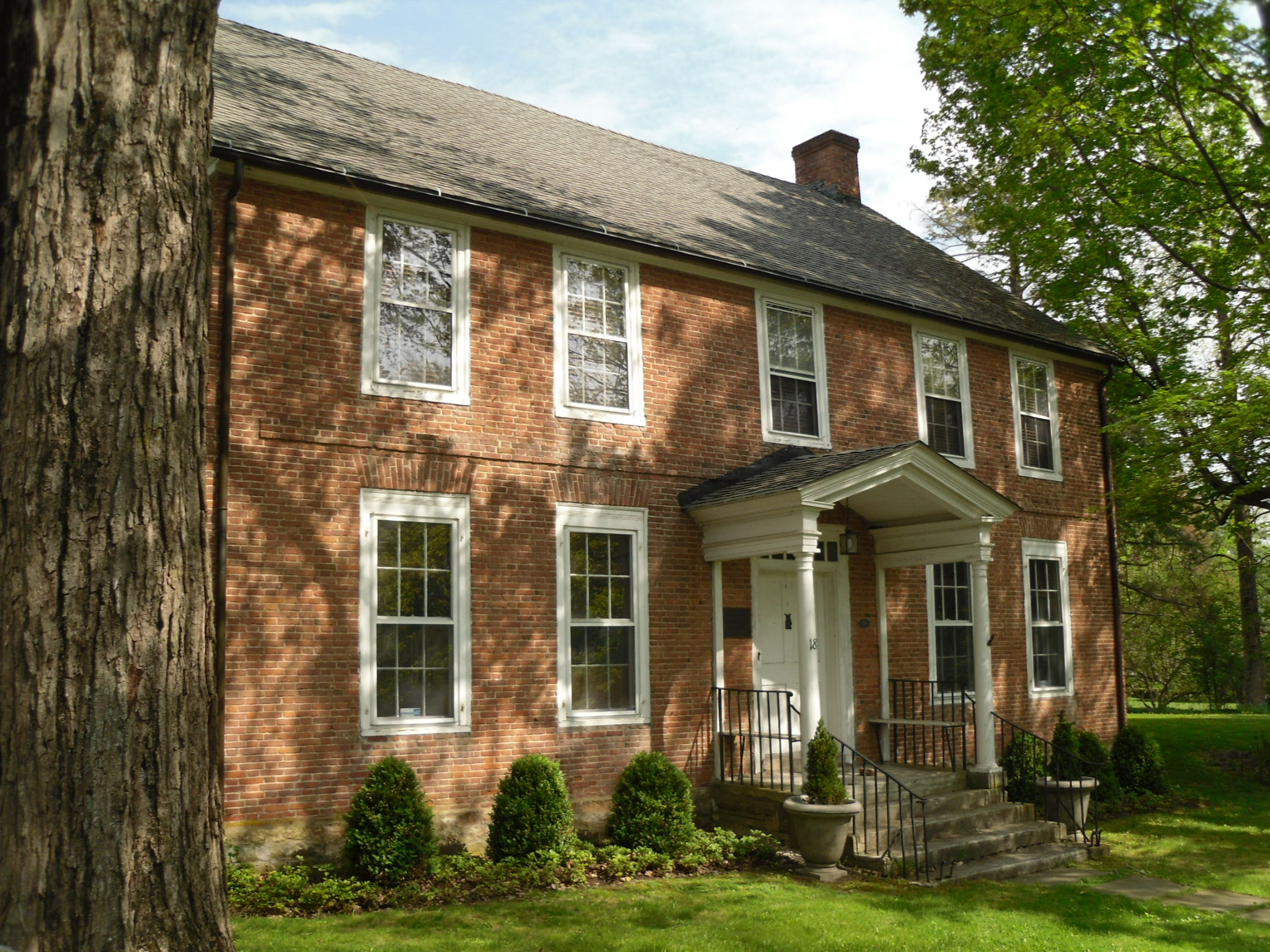

- Location within Connecticut Location within the United States
- Location: 18 Main Street, Sharon, Connecticut
- Coordinates: 41°52′37″N 73°28′37″W
- Area: 2 acres (0.81 ha)
- Built: 1775
- Part of: Sharon Historic District (ID93000257)
- NRHP reference No.: 79002619

Significant dates
- Added to NRHP: July 9, 1979
- Designated CP: April 15, 1993

The Ebenezer Gay House, also known locally as the Gay-Hoyt House, is a historic house museum at 18 Main Street in Sharon, Connecticut. Built in 1775, it is a well-preserved example of Georgian colonial architecture in brick. It was listed on the National Register of Historic Places in 1979, and is part of the Sharon Historic District, listed in 1993. It is now home to the Sharon Historical Society and Museum.

== Description and history ==
The Ebenezer Gay House stands at the southern end of Sharon's elongated town green, on the east side of Main Street directly opposite the First Congregational Church. It is a 2 1/2-story brick building, with a side gable roof, end chimneys, and a rubblestone foundation. The main facade faces west, and is five bays across, with a center entrance sheltered by a gabled porch support by slender round columns. The styling of the porch is Federal, suggesting it was added c. 1820. The interior has a central hall plan, and retains numerous original features, including fireplace paneling and cupboards.

The house was built in 1775-76 by Ebenezer Gay, a prominent local businessman who also led the local militia during the American Revolutionary War. Gay apparently financially supported the war effort to his personal ruin; he died insolvent in 1787, and the house was lost to foreclosure. The house was bequeathed to the Sharon Historical Society by Anne Hoyt in 1951. It now houses the society's collections.

== See also ==
- National Register of Historic Places listings in Litchfield County, Connecticut
