= Sharon Valley Historic District =

Historic district in Connecticut, United States

- U.S. National Register of Historic Places
- U.S. Historic district
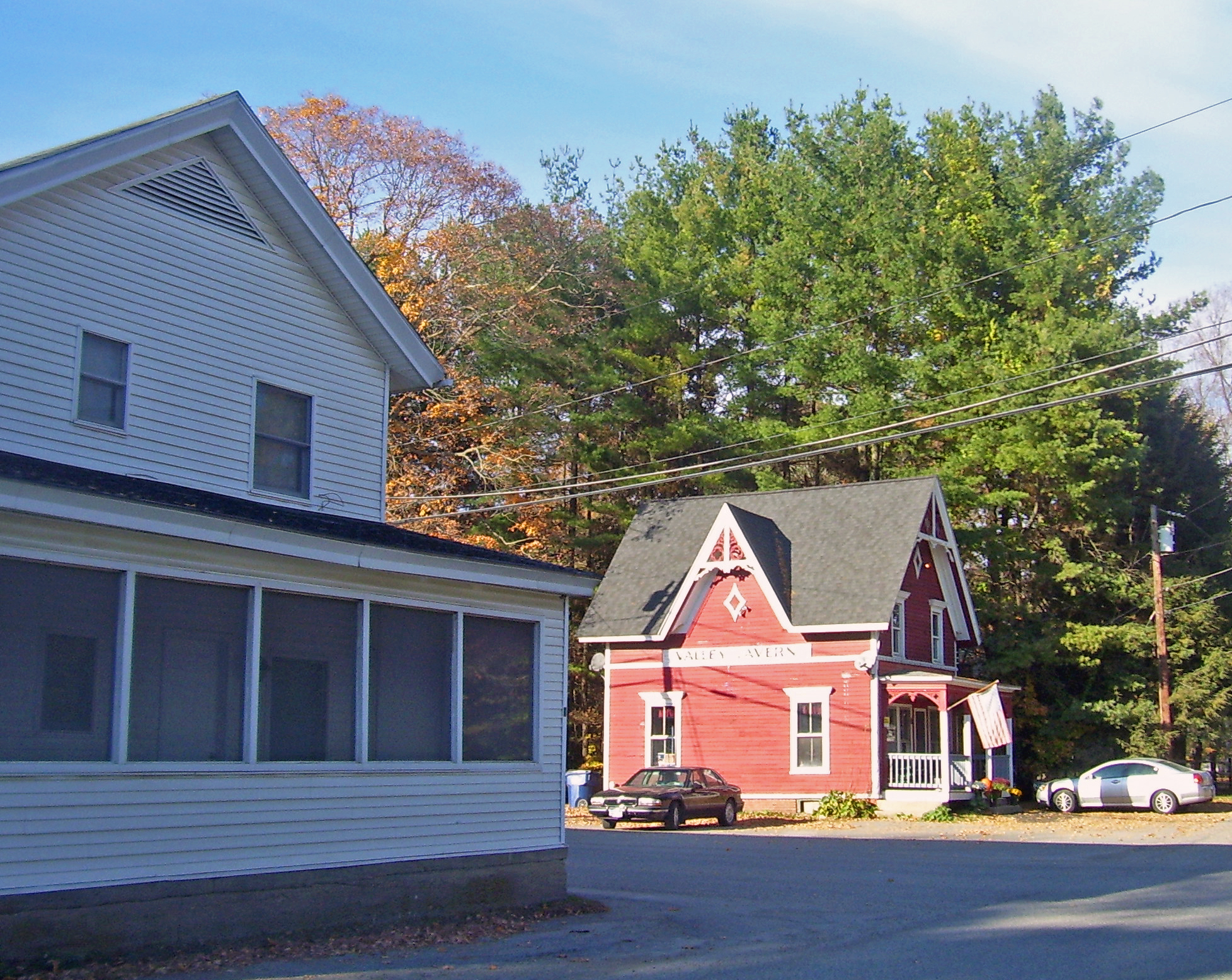
- Valley Tavern, 2008

- Location within Connecticut Location within the United States
- Location: Junction of Sharon Valley and Sharon Station Roads Sharon, Connecticut
- Coordinates: 41°53′2″N 73°29′32″W
- Area: 110 acres (45 ha)
- Built: 1825
- Architectural style: Greek Revival, Gothic Revival, Federal
- NRHP reference No.: 82004478
- Added to NRHP: September 9, 1982

The Sharon Valley Historic District is located around the Junction of Kings Hill, Sharon Valley and Sharon Station Roads in Sharon, Connecticut, United States. It is a small community that grew up around an iron mining and refining operation during the late 19th century, the first industry in Sharon.

Many of the buildings within date from that era. Some are intact examples of their respective architectural styles. There are remains of the original industrial facilities, and three iron bridges. The area was designated a historic district and listed on the National Register of Historic Places in 1982.

== Geography ==
The district is an irregularly shaped area of 110 acres (45 ha) mostly following the three roads whose intersection defines it in the area between Webutuck and Indian Lake creeks. Other than the area with the former lime kiln, the large town complex with garage, park and ballfields to the immediate west is not included. Its north and south boundaries are at the point where development, or at least houses from the period of significance, ends along the roads in those directions.

It is a mostly level residential area with mature, tall trees remaining from the forests that preceded its agricultural use. The intersection is located roughly one mile (1.6 km) north of state highway CT 343, a thousand feet (300 m) east of the New York state line. The nearest large settlements are Amenia, New York, to the west and downtown Sharon to the east. The large Coleman Station Historic District in North East, New York, is a short distance to the northwest.

Most of its several dozen contributing properties are 19th-century houses with the occasional outbuilding such as a barn. The oldest are in the Federal style and date to ca. 1825; the newest were built in the early 20th century. Non-contributing properties are mostly the more modern houses that have been built, some in the center of the district, and a state Department of Transportation sandpit. The land on which the mill, lime kiln and other remaining industrial facilities once stood is also included as a contributing property.

== History ==
Sharon's economy had been exclusively agricultural throughout the colonial era and after independence. Gristmills built on its creeks were precursors to industrialization, and in 1825 heavy industry came to Sharon with the construction of the first iron furnace. The valley, with both ideal water power from the two creeks, abundant forest for the making of charcoal, good sand, limestone in the nearby hills and ore near Indian Lake to the north, was an ideal site.

The Sharon Valley Iron Company's (SVI) cold blast furnace employed 12 at first, enough to make it the town's largest employer by the 1850 census. Over time they built six houses for their workers, a barn, and the Carpenter Gothic office at the center of the district, today the Valley Tavern. They also likely ran the lime kiln as a sideline to their main business.

A few years after SVI established its furnace, Asahel Hotchkiss began his malleable iron works behind his house at 53 Sharon Valley Road. He formed partnerships with other local entrepreneurs, and by 1850 he, too, was a major local employer, with that year's census counting nine workers and valuing his annual production at $25,000 ($968,000 in contemporary dollars). His son Andrew invented the exploding artillery shell, a weapon that proved useful to the Union Army in the American Civil War. By the time the conflict began the Hotchkisses had moved to a new plant at the junction of Indian Lake Creek and Sharon Valley Road. The 1860 census records Hotchkiss & Sons along with the closely related Jewett Manufacturing Company employing 87.

SVI went to hot blast production in 1863. After the war Hotchkiss moved to Bridgeport. The Jewett operations remained in the valley, and employed 48 in 1879. Demand declined late in the century. SVI sold out to Barnum & Morehouse in 1898, and the lime kiln and furnace shut down around two years later.

== Significant contributing properties ==
- Berlin Bridge over Webutuck Creek along Sharon Station Road. A lenticular truss bridge built by the Berlin Bridge Company in 1880 and shipped to the area for installation by local residents. It is considered the most visually distinctive of the three bridges in the district.
- Asahel Hotchkiss House, 53 Sharon Valley Road. One of the oldest houses in the district was the residence of one of its major entrepreneurs.
- Lime kiln ruins along Sharon Station Road at Webutuck Creek. A stone foundation and some blocks are the most that remain of any of Sharon Valley's industrial production facilities.
- Valley Tavern, 34 Sharon Valley Road. The Sharon Valley Iron Company used this distinctive Carpenter Gothic house at the Sharon Station Road intersection as their office.
- Abel Woods House, 36 Sharon Valley Road. Local lore dates this to 1750 but it is more likely to have been built around 1825. It is said to have some of the most elaborate Federal style interiors in the state.

== See also ==
- National Register of Historic Places listings in Litchfield County, Connecticut
