= Heard It in a Past Life =

2019 studio album by Maggie Rogers

Studio album by Maggie Rogers
- Released: January 18, 2019
- Genres: Indie pop; electropop; folk-pop
- Length: 45:27
- Labels: Debay; Capitol
- Producers: Maggie Rogers; Greg Kurstin; Doug Schadt; Ricky Reed; Kid Harpoon; Jack Hallenbeck; Lucio Westmoreland; Nick Das; Rostam

Maggie Rogers chronology
Now That the Light Is Fading (2017)	Heard It in a Past Life (2019)	Notes from the Archive: Recordings 2011–2016 (2020)

Singles from Heard It in a Past Life
- 1. "Alaska" Released: October 14, 2016; 2. "On + Off" Released: January 17, 2017; 3. "Fallingwater" Released: May 23, 2018; 4. "Give a Little" Released: July 27, 2018; 5. "Light On" Released: October 10, 2018; 6. "Burning" Released: January 4, 2019

Heard It in a Past Life is the debut studio album by American indie pop singer-songwriter Maggie Rogers, released on January 18, 2019, by Debay Sounds and Capitol Records. With help from its hit single "Light On" (2018), the album debuted at number two on the Billboard 200 chart and received mostly positive reviews from critics, eventually earning Rogers a Grammy Award nomination for Best New Artist.

== Recording and production ==
Rogers worked on the album for two years, with Rostam Batmanglij, Greg Kurstin, and other high-profile musicians in producer roles. Rogers stated in an interview about the album that "there was so much change that happened so fast, I wasn't always sure how to make all this stuff feel like me. I was really overwhelmed for a while, and scared too."

== Marketing and sales ==
The first two singles, "Alaska" and "On + Off", were previously released on Rogers' 2017 EP, Now That the Light Is Fading, followed by "Fallingwater", "Give a Little" and "Light On". "Light On" peaked at number one on Billboard's Adult Alternative Songs chart, becoming her first number one song on any Billboard chart. "Light On" was ranked as the 13th best song of 2019 by Billboard.

Heard It in a Past Life was released on January 18, 2019, by Debay Sounds under exclusive license to Capitol Records. According to Rolling Stone, it "announced her as a major indie-pop force and catapulted her into a yearlong tour of sold-out theaters and massive clubs". It debuted at number two on the Billboard 200 in its first release week, and by April, it had sold 200,000 album-equivalent units. Since its 2019 release, the album has amassed more than 900 million streams on Spotify.

== Critical reception ==
Professional ratings
Aggregate scores
Source	Rating
AnyDecentMusic?	7.0/10
Metacritic	71/100
Review scores
Source	Rating
AllMusic	4/5 stars
Chicago Tribune	2.5/4 stars
Clash	8/10
Exclaim!	8/10
The Guardian	2/5 stars
The Irish Times	3/5 stars
NME	4/5 stars
Pitchfork	5.9/10
Q	4/5 stars
Rolling Stone	4/5 stars

Heard It in a Past Life was met with generally positive reviews. At Metacritic, which assigns a normalised rating out of 100 to reviews from mainstream publications, the album received an average score of 71, based on 23 reviews. Tony Clayton-Lea of The Irish Times called it a "vibrant electro-pop collection", while USA Today's Maeve McDermott hailed it as one of 2019's best folk-pop albums, along with Weyes Blood's Titanic Rising. Q magazine found the album "thoughtfully constructed and often enchanting", and AllMusic's Heather Phares said Rogers "finds different ways to forge her own bright, assured version of pop" on a "strong debut".

Other reviewers were more critical. Both Laura Snapes of Pitchfork and Greg Kot of the Chicago Tribune believed much of the album was overproduced by high-profile co-producers to the detriment of Rogers' talents. Tom Ewing of Freaky Trigger was similarly critical, but "for different reasons – they [Pitchfork] point to the production flattening Rogers' voice, I think she pushes too much and too harshly against it." Tom Hull said he "could see her developing into some kind of pop star, but may be too adult too early", giving the album a B-plus.

Heard It in a Past Life and "Light On" helped earn Rogers a Grammy Award nomination in the category of Best New Artist for the 62nd Annual Grammy Awards (2020).

=== Rankings ===
Publication	List	Rank	Ref
Albumism	Albumism's 50 Best Albums of 2019	38	
Billboard	The 50 Best Albums of 2019	5	
Chorus.fm	Top 25 Albums of 2019	23	
Complex	The 50 Best Albums of 2019	25	
Consequence of Sound	The Top 50 Albums of 2019	25	
Esquire	20 Best Albums of 2019	N/A	
GQ	Best Albums of 2019	N/A	
Inside Hook	20 Best Albums of 2019	N/A	
The New Yorker	The Best Music of 2019	N/A	
Paste	The 50 Best Albums of 2019	26	
PopCrush	Best Pop Albums of 2019	N/A	
Rolling Stone	50 Best Albums of 2019	41	
Vice	The 100 Best Albums of 2019	88	

"N/A" indicates that the publication did not rank the works included in their year-end list.

== Track listing ==
Track listing and credits adapted from Tidal.

No.	Title	Writer(s)	Producer(s)	Length
1.	"Give a Little"	Margaret Rogers; Greg Kurstin	Kurstin; Rogers^{[a]}	3:46
2.	"Overnight"	Rogers; Kurstin	Kurstin; Rogers^{[b]}	3:20
3.	"The Knife"	Rogers; Kurstin	Kurstin; Rogers^{[a]}	3:59
4.	"Alaska"	Rogers; Doug Schadt	Rogers; Doug Schadt	3:08
5.	"Light On"	Rogers; Thomas Hull	Kurstin; Kid Harpoon; Rogers^{[a]}	3:53
6.	"Past Life"	Rogers	Rogers	3:36
7.	"Say It"	Rogers; Tor Miller; Jack Hallenbeck	Rogers; Hallenbeck; Ricky Reed; Lucio Westmoreland^{[a]}	3:40
8.	"On + Off"	Rogers; Nicholas Das	Rogers; Schadt; Das	3:41
9.	"Fallingwater"	Rogers; Rostam Batmanglij	Rogers; Batmanglij	4:31
10.	"Retrograde"	Rogers; Kurstin	Kurstin; Rogers^{[a]}	4:11
11.	"Burning"	Rogers; Eric Frederic	Rogers; Reed	3:33
12.	"Back in My Body"	Rogers	Rogers; Kurstin	4:09
Total length:				45:27

- ^a signifies an additional producer
- ^b signifies a co-producer

== Personnel ==
Musicians

- Maggie Rogers – vocals (all tracks), clapping (1), piano (3, 6), percussion (5, 10), programming (8), background vocals (9); drums, keyboards (12)
- Greg Kurstin – drums, keyboards (1–3, 5, 10, 12), bass (1, 3, 5, 10), guitar (1, 3, 5, 10, 12), synth bass (2, 12), piano (3, 5, 10, 12), percussion (10, 12)
- Doug Schadt – programming (4, 8)
- Kid Harpoon – acoustic guitar, bass guitar, drum programming, electric guitar, piano (5)
- Nicholas Das – programming (8)
- Rostam Batmanglij – 12-string acoustic guitar, background vocals, drum programming, piano, shaker, synthesizer programming (9)

Technical

- Emily Lazar – mastering (1–3, 5–7, 9–12)
- Serban Ghenea – mixing (1–3, 5, 7, 10–12)
- Tony Maserati – mixing (4, 8)
- Tom Elmhirst – mixing (6, 9)
- John Hanes – mix engineering (1–3, 5, 7, 10–12)
- Tyler Scott – mix engineering (4, 8)
- Zach Hancock – mix engineering (4, 8)
- Alex Pasco – engineering (1–3, 5, 10, 12)
- Greg Kurstin – engineering (1–3, 5, 10, 12)
- Julian Burg – engineering (1–3, 5, 10, 12)
- Doug Schadt – engineering (4)
- Zach Hancock – engineering (4)
- Chandler Harrod – engineering (6)
- Ethan Shumaker – engineering (7, 11)
- Jack Hallenbeck – engineering (7)
- Maggie Rogers – engineering (7)
- Nicholas Das – engineering (8)
- Rostam Batmanglij – engineering (9)
- Chris Allgood – mastering assistance (1–3, 5–7, 9, 11, 12)
- Brandon Bost – mixing assistance (9)
- Dalton Ricks – engineering assistance (9)
- Nick Rowe – engineering assistance (9)

== Charts ==
Chart (2019)	Peak position
Australian Albums (ARIA)	8
Belgian Albums (Ultratop Flanders)	92
Canadian Albums (Billboard)	10
Dutch Albums (Album Top 100)	95
Irish Albums (IRMA)	30
Scottish Albums (Official Charts)	18
Swiss Albums (Schweizer Hitparade)	49
UK Albums (Official Charts)	25
US Billboard 200	2
US Top Alternative Albums (Billboard)	1
US Indie Store Album Sales (Billboard)	3

== Certifications ==
Certifications for Heard It in a Past Life
Region	Certification	Certified units/sales
Canada (Music Canada)	Gold	40,000^{‡}
United States (RIAA)	Gold	500,000^{‡}
^{‡} Sales+streaming figures based on certification alone.
