= Alaska (song) =

2016 single by Maggie Rogers

Single by Maggie Rogers

from the EP Now That the Light Is Fading and the album Heard It in a Past Life
- Released: October 14, 2016
- Genre: Folk-dance; pop
- Length: 3:08
- Label: Debay Sounds; Capitol
- Songwriters: Maggie Rogers; Doug Schadt
- Producers: Rogers; Lawes; Schadt

Maggie Rogers singles chronology
"Alaska" (2016)	"Dog Years" (2016)

Music video
- "Alaska" on YouTube

"Alaska" is a song by American singer and songwriter Maggie Rogers. It was released on October 14, 2016, through Debay Sounds and Capitol Records, as the lead single from her extended play (EP), Now That the Light Is Fading (2017). The song was written and produced by Rogers and Doug Schadt. The song became popular after Rogers played it for Pharrell Williams at a master class held at her school. His reaction to the song went viral, and "Alaska" gained popularity.

== Background ==
In an interview with Alex Siber of Pigeons and Planes, Rogers said about the song: "The music, in a lot of ways, reflects this meditative quality I get from hiking and dancing. They're two polar opposite things when you're thinking about them from a distance. With one, you're alone in the middle of nature. The other involves loud music and groups of people. But my experiences with both of them in the last three years have turned them into a mental health thing, a grounding process. I think about them in the same way. They're the most ancient, primal release. When I had been hiking in summers after Alaska, I had been creating a natural sample bank of birds, noises. A good chunk of the rhythm in the song started from me just patting a rhythm on my jeans. That sample is the main rhythm. Me snapping in a room. I wanted to make dance music, or pop music, feel as human as possible." She also talked about the artwork for the single, saying "the artwork is from my time in Alaska—that's me in the red. It's funny, the 24 hours leading up to that photo were miserable. It had been raining for days straight, it was super foggy. We were having trouble navigating. We were in two different groups, separated from our friends. But that morning, everybody found each other and we cooked this big feast of pancakes and macaroni and cheese. Then the sun came up. We were in this glacial basin where there was this pool, essentially, and we hadn't seen any body of water like that. Nothing with that sort of volume. My best friend took that photo of me as we were getting water to cook the food [Laughs]. It seemed like the only appropriate way to represent the music."

== Critical reception ==
Idolator's Rachel Sonis labeled the song "endlessly infectious". Chris DeVille of Stereogum called it "a gorgeous thing to behold: thumping acoustic guitar figures, a crisply minimal disco drum beat, eerie background noise, thunderous bass, and twinkling pianos, all topped off by Grimes-reminiscent high-end vocal work. You're going to be hearing this one for a long time." Paste's Scott Russell dubbed it "hauntingly beautiful". Alex Siber of Pigeons and Planes said "what sounds like a soft-spoken soul begins to soar, liberated, as the record progresses. Rogers breathes the crisp air of glacial plains, fueling a voice that's at once as delicate and powerful as the nature she describes and samples in the track's backbone. Each component of 'Alaska' pulses with the same heartbeat, amplifying itself like an echo chamber in which dancing is required and sadness is left at the door. What remains is an ear worm as infectious as it is earnest, one that took time to crystallize."

== Music video ==
The music video, directed by Zia Anger, was released on October 18, 2016.

A Q&A with Baltimore magazine revealed that the music video was shot at her parents' home in Easton, Maryland.

Rachel Sonis of Idolator described the video: "The clip sees the singer dancing in the woods during what appears to be dusk. The image then switches to a full-on evening dance party amid the trees, as Rogers and a bunch of dancers proceed to effortlessly execute joyous choreography before she disappears into a dark field."

== Charts ==
Chart (2016–17)	Peak position
Belgium (Ultratip Bubbling Under Flanders)	13
US Adult Alternative Songs (Billboard)	13
US Hot Rock Songs (Billboard)	18

== Certifications ==
Region	Certification	Certified units/sales
Canada (Music Canada)	Gold	40,000^{‡}
United Kingdom (BPI)	Silver	200,000^{‡}
United States (RIAA)	Platinum	1,000,000^{‡}
^{‡} Sales+streaming figures based on certification alone.

== Release history ==
Region	Date	Format	Label	Ref.
United States	October 14, 2016	Digital download	Debay Sounds; Capitol	
United Kingdom	May 6, 2017	AC radio	Debay Sounds; Capitol	
