= Connecticut Route 112 =

State highway in Litchfield County, Connecticut, US

Route 112
- Map of Litchfield County in northwestern Connecticut with Route 112 highlighted in red

Route information
- Maintained by CTDOT
- Length: 6.68 mi (10.75 km)
- Existed: 1932–present

Major junctions
- West end: US 44 in Salisbury
- East end: US 7 in Salisbury

Location
- Country: United States
- State: Connecticut
- Counties: Litchfield

Highway system
- Connecticut State Highway System; Interstate; US; State; SSR; SR; Scenic
← Route 111	→ Route 113

Route 112 is a state highway in northwestern Connecticut, running entirely within the town of Salisbury. The route serves the village of Lime Rock.

== Route description ==
Route 112 begins at an intersection with US 44 in western part of the town of Salisbury as Interlaken Road. It heads southeast in between Lake Wononskopomuc and Lake Wononpakuk, passing by the Hotchkiss School and its associated golf course, to an intersection with Route 41 (for Salisbury center and Sharon) about 2 miles (3.2 km) later. Route 112 then continues southeast and east past Route 41 as Lime Rock Road through the village of Lime Rock and Lime Rock Park (an auto race track), crossing Salmon Creek, and eventually ending at an intersection with US 7 near the Housatonic River. The eastern terminus is a wye-junction, with Route 112 officially designated on the northern leg. The southern leg splits off from the main route about 0.1 miles (0.16 km) from the end, connecting to southbound US 7. Lime Rock Road continues north along US 7 towards Falls Village. Route 112 is a two-lane rural collector road and carries average daily traffic volumes of up to 2,900 in the Lime Rock Park area.

== History ==
Route 112 was established as part of the 1932 state highway renumbering over an old mining road (Lime Rock Road) and remains unchanged since then. The old road used to connect the mines at Lime Rock, when they were still active, with Falls Village, Salisbury center, and Sharon center.

== Junction list ==
The entire route is in Salisbury, Litchfield County.

mi	km	Destinations	Notes
0.00	0.00	US 44 – Canaan, Millerton	Western terminus
2.02	3.25	Route 41 – Lakeville, Sharon	
6.68	10.75	US 7 – Canaan, Cornwall	Eastern terminus
1.000 mi = 1.609 km; 1.000 km = 0.621 mi
