= Bill Binzen =

American photojournalist (1936–2020)

- Born: Frederick William Binzen Jr. September 21, 1918; Montclair, New Jersey, U.S.
- Died: November 1, 2010 (aged 92); Salisbury, Connecticut, U.S.
- Education: Art Students League of New York
- Occupations: Photographer, author, art director

Bill Binzen (September 21, 1918 – November 1, 2010) was an American photographer who began his freelance career after a decade of work as art director for a New York advertising agency. Examples of his work could be found in the popular Life Library of Photography series and one his composite photos, known as "Winter Climber", became widely known after appearing first in the Time-Life book called Color and later in popular magazines and trade books. Binzen also wrote and photo-illustrated children's books.

In the early 1950s, after completing a year of study at the Art Students League, he joined the Ogilvy, Benson & Mather advertising agency. As its art director, he helped the agency impart an aura of prestige to products such as men's shirts, tonic water, and vacations in Puerto Rico. His writing and freelance careers commenced after his departure from Ogilvy in 1962. One of his earliest books, Miguel's Mountain, received frequent journal citations over a period of 18 years following its publication in 1968, and one of the last books he produced, called Alfred the Little Bear, spawned a popular series.

Binzen was born in Montclair, New Jersey to a close-knit family that included his parents and two brothers. His father was an executive with the J. C. Penney Company. After graduating from a private boarding school in Connecticut, he worked as a page for the National Broadcasting Company and sometimes served as a tour guide in Radio City Music Hall. After the United States entered World War II, he joined the Army Air Corps and, after 16 months in training, served as co-pilot of a B-17 bomber, flying missions from Italy into Central Europe during the last years of the war. He was living in Salisbury, Connecticut when he died in 2010.

== Early life ==
Raised in Montclair, New Jersey, he attended Choate, a private boarding school in Connecticut. On graduating, he spent a year at the University of Virginia, leaving after a year to travel and study art at the University of Arizona. After World War II service as a bomber pilot, he took classes at the Art Students League.

== Career as an advertising executive ==
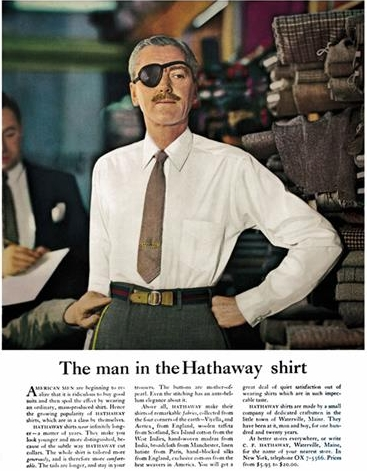
Bill Binzen, New Yorker ad for Hathaway Shirts, 1951

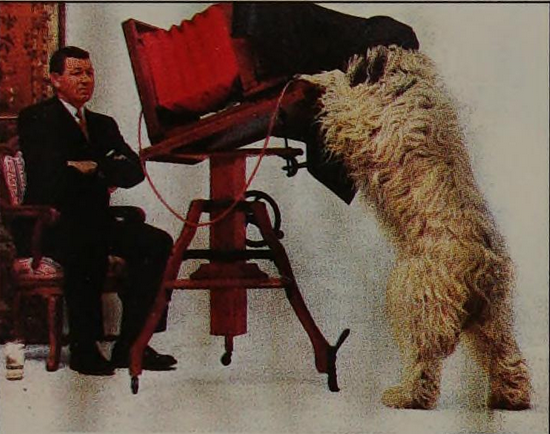
Bill Binzen, Puerto Rican rum campaign ad, 1955

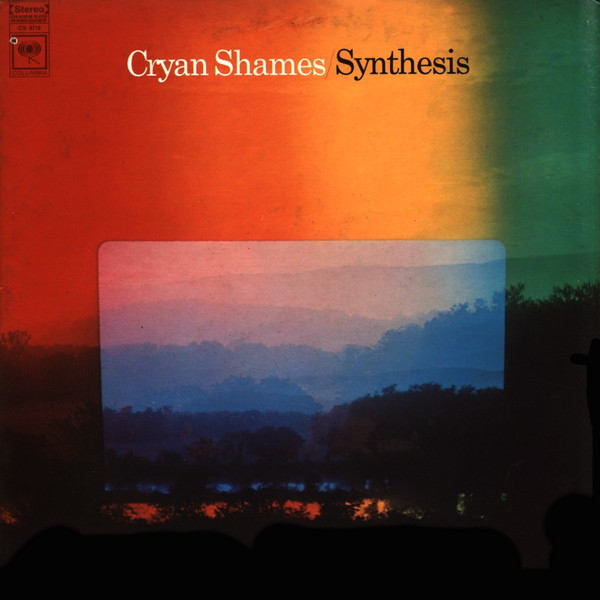
Bill Binzen, Cryan Shames Album Cover, 1968

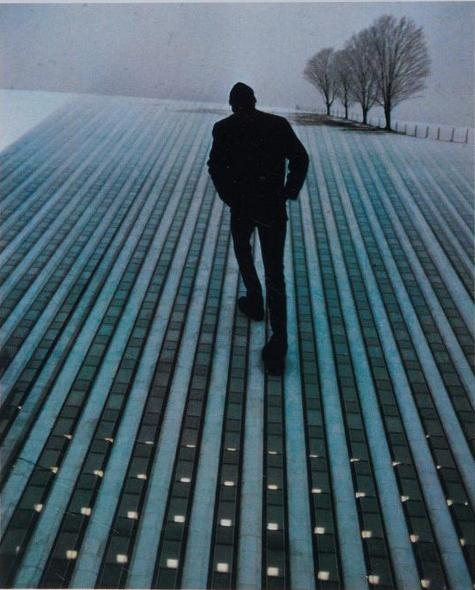
Bill Binzen, Winter Climber (composite photo), 1969

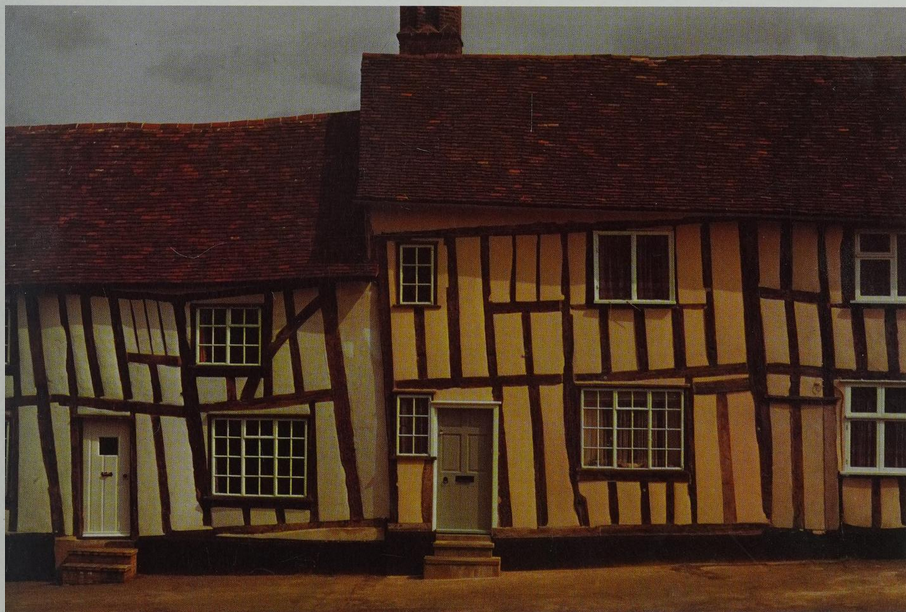
Bill Binzen, East Anglian House, 1970

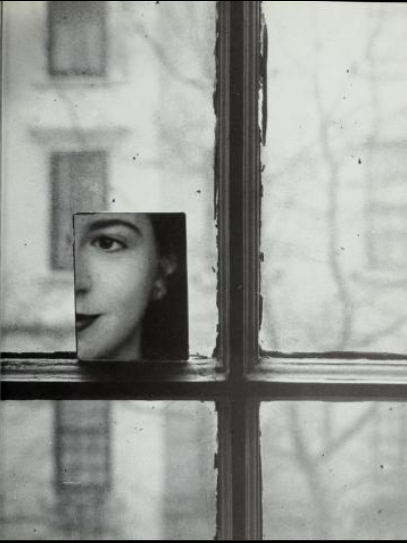
Bill Binzen, image from Family of Woman (1969, Grosset and Dunlap)

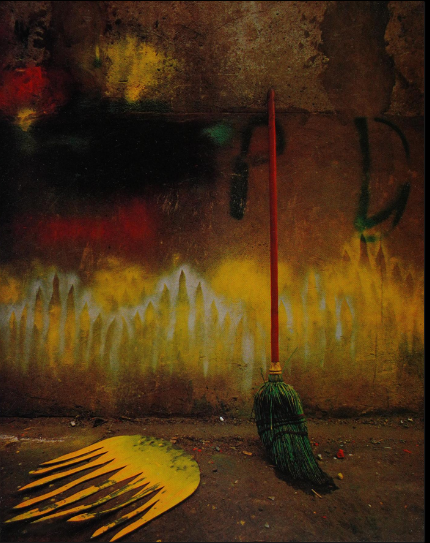
Bill Binzen, Broom Leaning on Painted Wall, 1981

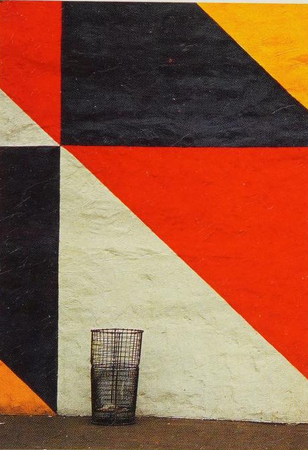
Bill Binzen, Trash Can in Front of Painted Wall, 1981

On leaving the Art Students League, Binzen joined the Foote, Cone & Belding advertising agency and in January 1951 became art director of the Ogilvy, Benson & Mather agency. Later that year, Ogilvy acquired the account for the Hathaway textile firm and began to promote its inexpensive men's shirts as luxury products. The ads Binzen produced showed a distinguished man with a black eye patch, and the campaign came to be known as "the man in the Hathaway shirt". One source says that sales skyrocketed and another says that the ad made the small Hathaway firm instantly famous.

In 1998, at the urging of his son Nathaniel, Binzen wrote an account of his work at Ogilvy. At the outset of an ad campaign, he wrote, the art director and a copywriter would collaborate on rough outlines of the project and together they would block out ads. Then, after discussions with an account manager, they would prepare a mockup to submit for the client's approval.

In 1950 Ogilvy began promoting the British soft drinks firm Schweppes, again presenting its products as high-class and having exceptional value. A year later the agency produced its first Schweppes ad featuring the suave and cosmopolitan head of Schweppes' American operations, Commander Edward Whitehead, in a successful effort to give snob appeal to Schweppes tonic water. Late in his career, Binzen said this campaign was one of his favorites.

In 1955 Puerto Rico's Economic Development Administration hired Ogilvy to help change the public image of the commonwealth from poverty-stricken backwater to desirable vacation destination. This, Binzen's biggest campaign, was the one of which he was most proud. He won an award for an ad in this project that showed the commonwealth as a classy destination. He also produced an ad showing a dog making a studio portrait of his owner (and "best friend") to promote a Puerto Rican rum. One of the last campaigns that Binzen worked on aimed to increase the appeal of an elite product, the Bentley automobile, by describing it as "the only car in the world as good as a Rolls Royce".

== Career as a freelance photographer ==
In 1955, while still working as art director for Ogilvy, Binzen submitted to Life magazine some photos he had made by sticking cutout figures on window panes. Using a technique called forced perspective, the images created the illusion that the figures were performing whimsical and entirely unlikely tricks such as jumping from the roof of a building, diving into the icy Hudson River, or dangling from the pull of a window blind. The two-page spread that Life published carried the title "Windows on a World; Camera Inside Sees Odd Antics Outside". During this period Binzen published photos in a variety of popular magazines, including Town and Country, Harper's, Theater Arts, and Esquire.

In 1962 Binzen left Ogilvy to work full time as a professional photographer. In 1970 a book called simply Color—one in a series of 17 published by Time-Life as the Life Library of Photography—contained seven photos that Binzen had taken during the previous few years. The images were used in sections discussing topics such as "Colors of Time and Place" and "Shooting Color Early or Late, Rain or Shine". In one section, called "Fantasy from Sandwiching", the book showed a composite photo that would become one of Binzen's best-known works. Produced in 1969 and called "Winter Climber", it seemed to show a man walking up the side of a skyscraper toward a snow-swept hillside. To make the photo, he sandwiched two transparencies, one of them showing a man trudging uphill in northwestern Connecticut on a misty winter day and the other a photo of the General Motors Building in New York City. Two years later, the photo appeared again in a feature article in Horizon magazine. In 1972, when Binzen published a book devoted to his sandwiching technique (Doubletake, Grossman Publishers), it had the image as its cover photo. It appeared a fourth time on the cover of Harper's Magazine and a fifth time on the cover of a book that was an expanded version of the Harper's article (Scenes from Corporate Life by Earl Shorris, 1984, Penguin Books).

Binzen's work was included in three other books in the Time-Life series. One, called Photographing Children (1971), contained five of his photos dating from 1960 to 1964 in sections called "Baby Pictures" and "Doing What Comes Naturally". The second, called Special Problems (1971), contained a 1967 Binzen photo under the heading "Sacrificing Detail to Create a Mood". The third, Travel Photography printed a 1970 photo under the heading "The Traveler's Eye" showed a crazily tilted East pair of East Anglian houses.

As the photos Time-Life accepted for its book on children suggest, Binzen was particularly adept and became widely known for his skill in photographing children. Between 1963 and 1976 he published ten children's books containing his photos along with his text. He also published a book, his first, that contained his drawings and text. In 1971 he took photos to accompany two children's books in which he was named as co-author. In the first, All in a Summer's Day (Pantheon Books), his photos appeared with poems by William Wise. In the second, The Park in the City (Dutton), his photos accompanied text by Philip Ressner exploring the pleasures of parks in Manhattan, Brooklyn, and Staten Island. In 1973 the Christmas issue of Time magazine had a Binzen photo of a wishful young child on its cover.

Binzen was the sole author of three books for adults. In 1968 he published a book of photos taken on a street in Manhattan that stretches from the banks of the Hudson River in Greenwich Village all the way to the banks of the East River in the East Village. The book, Tenth Street (Grossman Publishers, New York), contains 95 pages of images and very little text, altogether showing what one reviewer called a "formidable cross-section of humanity". The reviewer added, "Binzen really involves us in this congested, noisy human confusion... This is not a pretty book, but it has a rare vitality and conviction." One of Binzen's photos of 10th Street appeared in the Time-Life book called Color in the section on "Shooting Color Early or Late". The accompanying description said Binzen had taken it early one morning from a window in his apartment to convey a "sense of silence, of waiting for the day's work to begin.". Another 10th Street photo appeared on the cover of a book by Susan Neunzig Cahill called The Urban Reader (1971, Prentice-Hall).

Binzen's Doubletake (Grossman Publishers) appeared in 1972. It was a small-format book containing mostly sandwiched images with a minimal amount of text. One of its reviewers noted, "All of the photos in the book are a little odd, and you are likely to do a double take on first viewing them." By 1986 Binzen had moved from Manhattan to a small town in the northwest corner of Connecticut and in that year he published his third book for adults, a book of 90 color plates celebrating that region of the country. Entitled The Berkshires (Skyline Press), it used photos taken for the most part within 30 miles of his home to show what he called "the flow of the seasons".

Other books for adults that include his photography include The Family of Woman (by Jerry Mason, Grosset & Dunlap), After the First Death (by Robert Cormier, Pantheon Books, 1979), More Joy of Photography (by Keith A. Boas, Addison-Wesley and Eastman Kodak, 1981), the Kodak Pocket Guide to 35mm Photography (Eastman Kodak, 1981), and Fragmenting Family (by Brenda Oxford Almond, Clenendon Press, 2006).

Between 1968 and 1991 Binzen made cover photos for 11 music sound recordings. The first two appeared on vinyl LPs produced by Columbia Records: (1) a trio led by Dave Brubeck on piano with Gerry Mulligan on baritone saxophone and (2) Synthesis by The Cryan' Shames, a psychedelic rock album featuring guitarist Isaac Guillory. Binzen's other cover photos appeared on: Naniwa Express (1974, Sony), Rock of Ages by the Mormon Tabernacle Choir (1975, Columbia), The Restful Mind by Larry Coryell (1975, Vanguard), Late Choral Music, Ludwig van Beethoven, London Symphony Orchestra (1975, Columbia), Drop Me Off in Harlem by Richie Kamuca (1977, Concord Jazz), Wall of Sound by Invisible Army (1987, Perfect Beat), Darkness Into by Priscilla Herdman (1987, Flying Fish), You So Secret by Martyn Bates (1989, Integrity), and Endless Joy by Juan José Verdú Luna (1991, Bioinformation Study).

=== Exhibitions ===
Between 1977 and 2003, Binzen participated in shows at nonprofit galleries in Connecticut and Massachusetts. These included shows in West Cornwall, Connecticut, in 1977, 1978, and 1979; as well as shows in Lakeville, Connecticut; Canton, Connecticut; and Sheffield, Massachusetts. The 1977 show included a work called "Canoe" that a reviewer called "the focal point of the show" as well as a photo of 10th Street apartment buildings that the review called "Hopperesque". In 1979 he was given a solo exhibition at the Gimbels art gallery in Manhattan. In 2002 and 2003 he was given retrospective exhibitions in schools to which he was connected, the first at Hotchkiss and the second at Choate.

=== Photographic technique ===
Binzen preferred to use 35 mm cameras in taking natural-light images. He liked to use color film as a rule but used black and white when filming children in motion or other action subjects. He occasionally used pre- and post-production techniques to create special effects. These can be seen in the 1955 Life photos and his photos created by sandwiching. However, most of his photos showed minimal or no manipulation on his part. His son, William Binzen, remembers him saying, "I find it very hard to describe what I’m looking for when I look through my camera lens, but I do know that it has everything to do with balanced composition and subtle mood. When those are right, the picture makes itself."

== Books for children ==
Between 1963 and 1976, Binzen published 11 books for children. Each relied mainly on photographs to tell its story. The books were popular, some going into multiple editions. Reviewers were generally, but not entirely, enthusiastic. His first children's book contained his drawings rather than photos. Called Little Will, the Bugle Boy (Abelard) it came out in 1963. Binzen told his son that the drawings were the result of the months he had spent during 1959–1960 in Florence, Italy. His first photo book for children was Miguel's Mountain (Coward, 1968) which tells of a pile of dirt in Manhattan's Tompkins Square Park near Binzen's apartment. A group of children who enjoy playing on it become worried on hearing a rumor that the city is about to remove it. One of them, Miguel, manages to convince the authorities to change their mind. This book has black and white photos. An ad in Horn Book Magazine called it "a warm and realistic urban story about a boy who has never been out of the city." A search of the Google Scholar database made in 2025 showed frequent journal citations to it between 1968 and 1986. In 1969 Binzen wrote another book focused on an urban child with a Hispanic name. Entitled Carmen (Coward-McCann), it features a lonely little girl recently arrived in New York from rural Puerto Rico whose outlook brightens when she makes friends with a girl whose family lives across the street. The next was called Punch and Jonathan (Pantheon, 1969). Its main character, Jonathan, finds a Punch puppet, plays with him, and eventually gets a behind-the-scenes view of how a puppet show works. A notice from a librarian called it "beautifully illustrated". In 1970 Binzen introduced a stuffed bear called Alfred as the hero of what proved to be a series of three successful books. In Alfred, the Little Bear (Doubleday), Alfred explores the outdoor world. A reviewer for the Chicago Tribune called it a "charmer", saying that his four-year-old child insisted on re-reading it again and again. The other two books were Alfred Goes House Hunting and Alfred Goes Flying. One source called the series "probably his best known and loved" of his books and another said it was probably the "most beloved". Binzen's son said his readers, both children and adults, would frequently write him about the three.

Three books appeared in 1972. First Day in School (Doubleday, 1972) shows the reactions of children as they experience a kindergarten classroom for the first time. Apprehensive at the start, they eventually overcome their fears and find that school can be fun. Rooftop Hogi (Doubleday) follows a boy who watches a neighbor's rooftop pigeons and one day decides to join them in a flight across New York City. The publisher called it "a young boy's escape from the heat, noise, and boredom of a summer afternoon in the city." The Walk (Coward) follows two boys as they take a walk off city streets into the countryside, finding beauty even in the litter they encounter. The Rory Story (Doubleday, 1974) is a narrative by a puppy about his daily activities with children in the house where he lives, in its neighborhood, and on family outings. A library notice called it "an excellent, true-to-life picture book."

== Personal life and family ==
Binzen was born in Montclair, New Jersey, on September 21, 1918. His birth name was Frederick William Binzen. His father, also named Frederick William Binzen, was an executive vice president of the J. C. Penney Company. His mother was Lucy Husted Binzen. He had two younger brothers, Peter and David.

His first job on leaving college was as a page for the National Broadcasting Company in Rockefeller Center and tour guide at Radio City Music Hall. When the US entered World War II, he tried to join the Army Air Corps but, because he was too light for his height, he did not pass the Army's physical exam. He then spent nine months at a Jackson Hole dude ranch, working to increase his weight, and then passed his physical exam on the second try in October 1942. Once trained, he served in the 463rd Operations Group as co-pilot of a B-17 bomber its crew named Umbriago. During 1944 and 1945 he flew 25 missions from an airfield in Foggia, Italy, to targets in Central Europe. Other members of the crew included Norman Lear as radio operator and dorsal turret gunner. In 1944 his unit received a citation for an exceptionally long run to Berlin. Although 17 of 31 bombers were downed by enemy fire, the group achieved its objectives and the surviving planes returned safely to base.

In 1947 Binzen married Sara Jane Hipp, stepdaughter of a prominent New York furrier. They had one child, Frederick William Binzen. He and Hipp were divorced in 1954. In 1959 Binzen married Gaile Longden, whom he had met when she was a copywriter at the Ogilvy agency where Binzen served as art director. They had three children: Susanna, Timothy, and Nathaniel. During the 1960s the family lived on 10th Street in New York's East Village. By 1970 they had moved to Salisbury, Connecticut, where he resided for the rest of his life. Binzen died on November 1, 2010, after battling both cancer and pneumonia.
