= Gridley Mountain =

Mountain in Connecticut, United States

- Location within Connecticut

Highest point
- Elevation: 2,211 ft (674 m)
- Prominence: 72 m (236 ft)
- Coordinates: 42°02′24″N 73°27′59″W

Geography
- Location: Salisbury, Connecticut, U.S.
- Parent range: Taconic Mountains
- Topo map: USGS Ashley Falls

Geology
- Rock age: Devonian

Gridley Mountain, 2,211 feet (674 m), is the third highest elevation in the state of Connecticut. The mountain, part of the Taconic Range, has no official trail and is located on private property. The Mount Washington Road passes the mountain from the west.

Gridley Mountain is located in Salisbury, Connecticut. It is flanked to the northwest by Round Mountain, to the northeast by Bear Mountain, and to the west by Brace Mountain. The west side of the mountain drains into Riga Lake and South Pond, then into Wachocostinook Brook, Salmon Creek, the Housatonic River, and Long Island Sound. The east side drains into Brassie Brook, Ball Brook, Moore Brook, then into the Housatonic River.
