= Connecticut Route 41 =

State highway in Litchfield County, Connecticut, US

Route 41
- Map of Litchfield County in northwestern Connecticut with Route 41 highlighted in red

Route information
- Maintained by CTDOT
- Length: 17.86 mi (28.74 km)
- Existed: 1932–present

Major junctions
- South end: CR 2 at the New York state line in Amenia Union, NY
- Route 4 in Sharon; Route 112 in Salisbury; US 44 in Salisbury
- North end: Route 41 at the Massachusetts state line near Salisbury

Location
- Country: United States
- State: Connecticut
- Counties: Litchfield

Highway system
- Connecticut State Highway System; Interstate; US; State; SSR; SR; Scenic
← Route 40	→ Route 42

Route 41 is a 17.86-mile (28.74 km) scenic state highway in rural Northwestern Connecticut. It extends from the New York state line in Sharon to the Massachusetts state line in Salisbury and is the only state-numbered route in Connecticut that has both its ends at a state border.

== Route description ==
Route 41 begins as Amenia Union Road at a junction with Dutchess County Route 2 in the hamlet of Amenia Union at the New York state line in the town of Sharon. Route 41 proceeds north for 3.4 miles (5.5 km) towards the Sharon Country Club, veering to the east then back north, becoming South Main Street. In the town center of Sharon, Route 41 intersects with Route 343 and Route 4, becoming Main Street north of the junction. After about 0.2 miles (0.32 km), Route 361 leaves to the west, with Route 41 continuing northeast on North Main Street. After leaving the town center, the road becomes Gay Street, running for another 3.1 miles (5.0 km) to the Salisbury town line.

Upon entering Salisbury, the road name changes to Sharon Road as it heads for another 3.2 miles (5.1 km) towards the village of Lakeville. Along the way, it intersects with Route 112 just south of Wononskopomuc Lake. In Lakeville, Route 41 begins a 1.7-mile (2.7 km) overlap with U.S. Route 44 (Main Street), as the road heads into the town center of Salisbury. In Salisbury center, Route 41 splits off from Route 44 along Under Mountain Road. The road travels for about 4.8 miles (7.7 km), passing by Mount Riga State Park, until the Massachusetts state line. The road continues across the state line as Massachusetts Route 41.

Connecticut designates various sections of its rural highways as scenic roads. The scenic designation not only encourages sightseeing but also prevents certain developments alongside and on the road itself that would alter its appearance, including rerouting and widening. In July 1990, a four-mile (6 km) section through the town center of Sharon, between Boland Road and Cole Road, was designated as a scenic road. In October 1992, the scenic designation was extended an additional 4.4 miles (7.1 km) to cover the length of the route within the town of Sharon. The following year, the town of Salisbury applied for and received approval for a scenic designation for its portion of Route 41, which resulted in the entire length of Route 41 being designated a scenic route.

== History ==
The portion of Route 41 north of modern Route 343 was part of the 1920s New England Interstate Route 4. The portion south of Route 343 was originally a secondary state highway designated as Highway 360. In 1926, New England Route 4 was designated by AASHO as U.S. Route 7. By 1928, however, US 7 was relocated to its modern alignment. In the 1932 state highway renumbering, modern Route 41 was established from part of old New England Route 4 and old State Highway 360. No significant changes to the route have been made since.

== Junction list ==
The entire route is in Litchfield County.

Location	mi	km	Destinations	Notes
Sharon	0.00	0.00	CR 2 – South Amenia, NY	Southern terminus; New York state line
Sharon	4.33	6.97	Route 4 east / Route 343 west – Cornwall, Amenia, NY	Western terminus of Route 4; eastern terminus of Route 343
Sharon	4.54	7.31	Route 361 north – Millerton, NY	Southern terminus of Route 361
Salisbury	9.66	15.55	Route 112 – Lime Rock, Salisbury	
Salisbury	11.36	18.28	US 44 west – Millerton, NY, Amenia, NY	Southern end of US 44 concurrency
Salisbury	13.03	20.97	US 44 east – Canaan, Winsted	Northern end of US 44 concurrency
Salisbury	17.86	28.74	Route 41 north – Sheffield, Great Barrington	Continuation into Massachusetts
1.000 mi = 1.609 km; 1.000 km = 0.621 mi
