= Round Mountain (Taconic Mountains) =

Mountain in Connecticut, United States

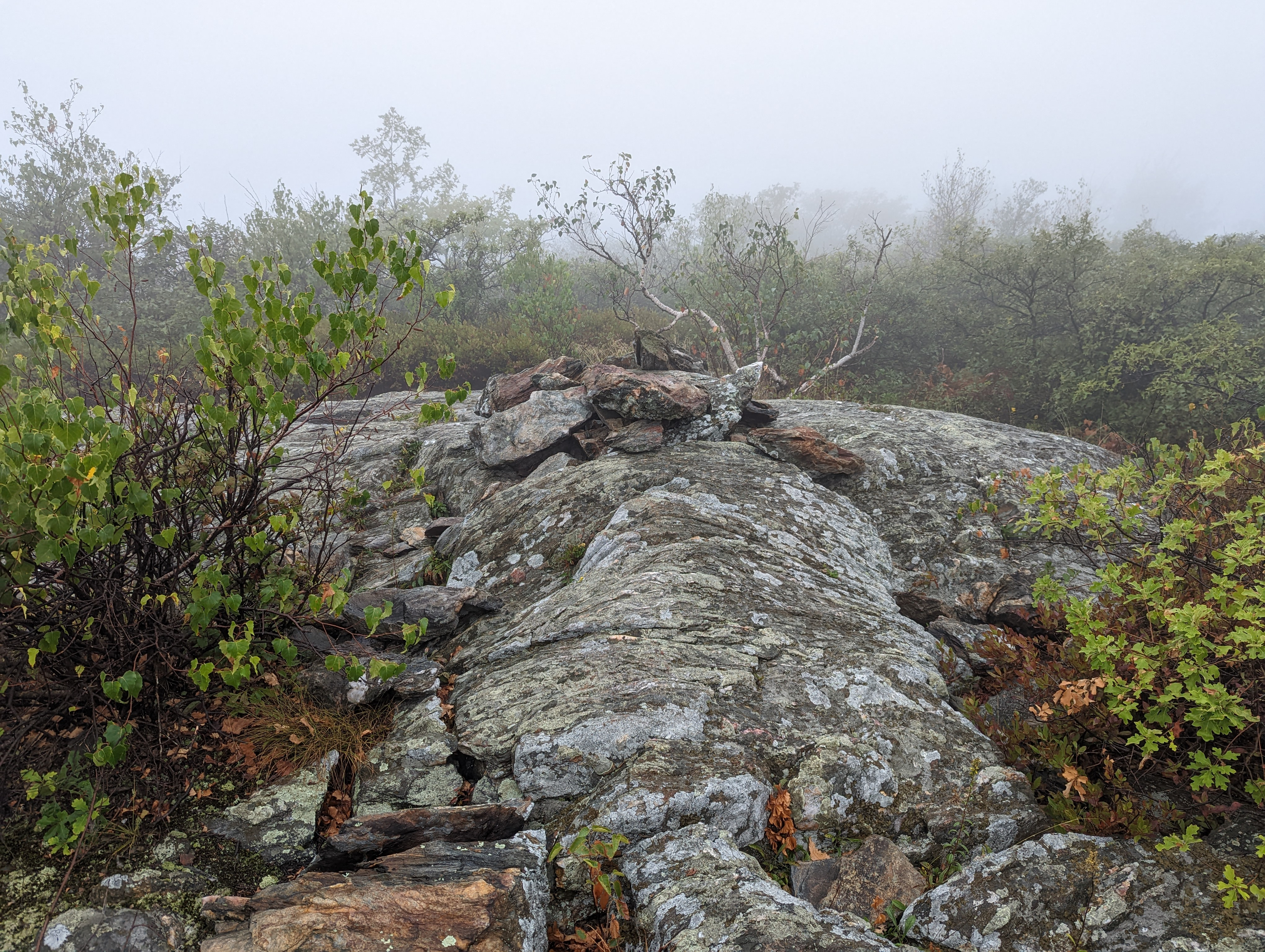
- Summit of Round Mountain

Highest point
- Elevation: 2,296 ft (700 m)
- Coordinates: 42°02′56″N 73°28′35″W

Geography
- Location: Mount Washington, Massachusetts and Salisbury, Connecticut
- Parent range: Taconic Mountains

Geology
- Rock age: Ordovician
- Mountain type(s): Thrust fault; metamorphic rock and sedimentary rock

Climbing
- Easiest route: Mount Frissel Trail

Should not be confused with Rounds Mountain, also located in Massachusetts.

Round Mountain, 2,296 feet (700 m), located on the border of southwest Massachusetts and northwest Connecticut, is a prominent peak of the Taconic Range. The peak and southern slopes of the mountain are within Connecticut; the northern slope lies within Massachusetts.

The mountain is located within the towns of Mount Washington, Massachusetts and Salisbury, Connecticut; much of it has been conserved as part of Massachusetts' Mount Washington State Forest and Connecticut's Mount Riga Forest Preserve. The south side of Round Mountain drains into Riga Lake and South Pond, then into Wachocostinook Brook, Salmon Creek, the Housatonic River, and Long Island Sound. The north side drains into Sages Ravine, thence into Schenob Brook, the Housatonic River, and Long Island Sound. Round Mountain is bordered by Mount Frissell to the northwest, Mount Ashley to the north, and Bear Mountain to the east.

Round Mountain is traversed by the Mount Frissell Trail which connects with the South Taconic Trail to the west and the Appalachian Trail to the east.
