= Salisbury Center Historic District =

Historic district in Connecticut, United States

- U.S. National Register of Historic Places
- U.S. Historic district
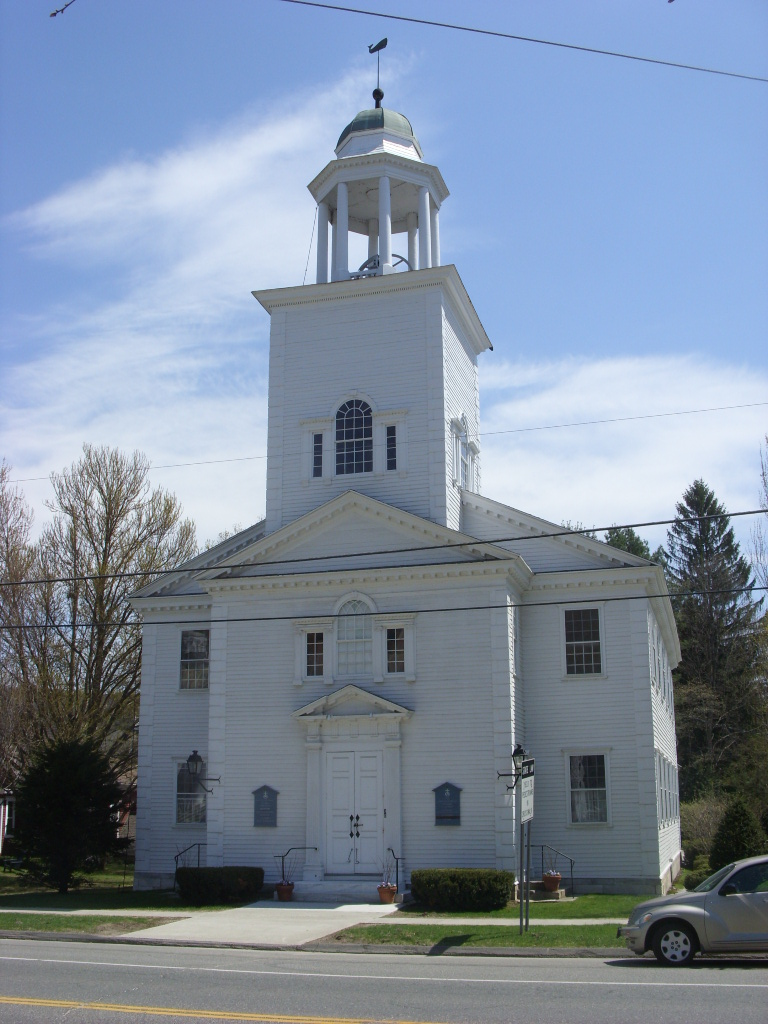

- Location within Connecticut Location within the United States
- Location: Roughly along Academy, East Main, Factory, and Main Streets, and 15 Underwood Road, Salisbury, Connecticut
- Coordinates: 41°58′58″N 73°25′25″W
- Area: 26 acres (11 ha)
- Built: 1800
- Architect: Bartlett, Truman H.; Bissell, George E.
- Architectural style: Early Republic, Mid 19th Century Revival, Late Victorian
- NRHP reference No.: 97001115
- Added to NRHP: September 11, 1997

The Salisbury Center Historic District encompasses the historic town center and main commercial district of Salisbury, Connecticut. Established in 1741, it has served in that role since, and now reflects a typical 19th-century small town center. It extends along Main Street, between its Junctions with Library Street and Under Mountain Road. The district was listed on the National Register of Historic Places in 1997.

== Description and history ==
The town of Salisbury, located in Connecticut's northwest corner, was incorporated in 1741, and thrived economically on the exploitation of iron ore which had been found in its hills. This resource was overtaken by technological advances by the American Civil War, and the town experienced no significant further economic growth. The town center developed in the mid-1740s, with the Bushnell Tavern established in 1746, and the cemetery in 1750. A portion of the original tavern survives in altered form at 6 Factory Street.

The historic district is bounded on the north by the triangular town green, formed by the junction of Main Street and Under Mountain Road, and the White Hart Tavern, a rambling building dating to about 1800. The southern end of the district is anchored by the civic buildings of the town hall and the Scoville Library, both set on large landscaped lots. The town hall is a modern construction from 1988, but retains traditional features such as clapboard siding and pilasters, while the library is an 1894 Romanesque stone building donated by a local benefactor. The commercial district is a roughly three-block area set between these, with modestly scaled two-story buildings, many of which are former residences converted to commercial use.

== See also ==
- National Register of Historic Places listings in Litchfield County, Connecticut
