= Kisnop =

Kisnop may refer to:

- Kisnop, a former name of the SS Empire Dabchick
- Kisnop Brook, a variant name of Schenob Brook
