= Lot Norton =

American politician (1803–1880)

Personal details
- Born: January 15, 1803 Lakeville, Connecticut, U.S.
- Died: May 29, 1880 (aged 77)
- Spouse: Martha Whittlesey
- Children: 6
- Education: Yale College
- Occupation: Politician; farmer

Lot Norton (January 15, 1803 – May 29, 1880) was an American politician from Connecticut. He served as a member of the Connecticut State Legislature.

== Early life ==
Lot Norton was born on January 15, 1803, in Lakeville, Salisbury, Connecticut, to Mary (née Hickok) and Lot Norton. He graduated from Yale College in 1822.

== Career ==
Norton worked as a farmer on his father's estate. In 1857, he served as a member of the Connecticut State Legislature.

== Personal life ==
Norton married Martha Whittlesey, daughter of Eliphalet Whittlesey, of Salisbury. They had six children.

Norton died on May 29, 1880, while attending the village church.
