= Mount Frissell =

Mountain in Massachusetts and Connecticut, United States

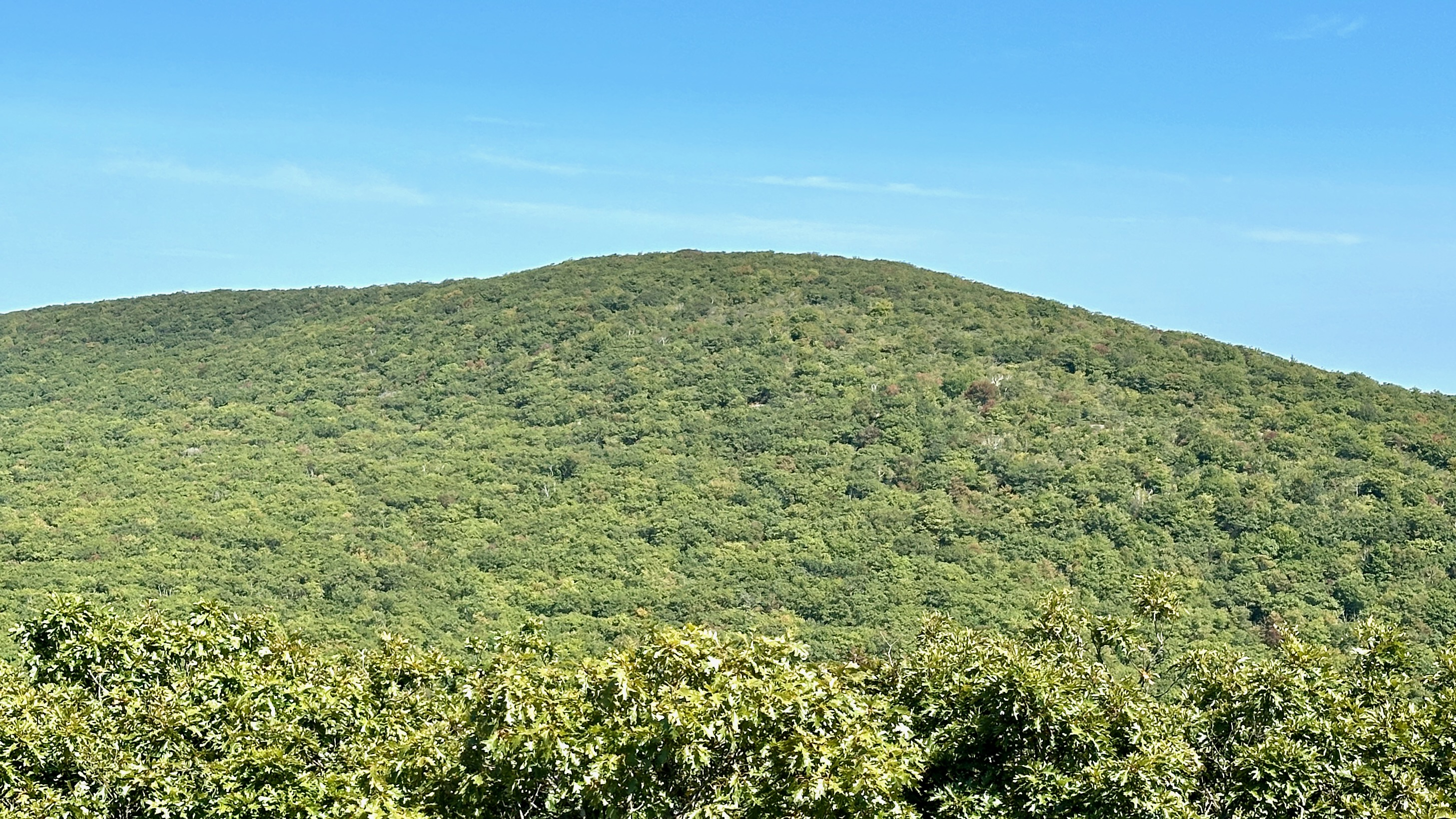
- Mount Frissell as seen from Brace Mountain in New York

Highest point
- Elevation: 2,454 ft (748 m) NAVD 88
- Prominence: 781 ft (238 m)
- Listing: U.S. state high points 36th
- Coordinates: 42°03′04″N 73°28′55″W

Geography
- Location within Massachusetts
- Location: Mount Washington, Massachusetts and Salisbury, Connecticut
- Parent range: Taconic Mountains

Geology
- Rock age: Ordovician
- Mountain type(s): Thrust fault; metamorphic rock and sedimentary rock

Climbing
- Easiest route: Mount Frissell Trail

Mount Frissell is a 2,454-foot (748 m) mountain in the Taconic Range of the Northeastern United States. It is notable for featuring both a tripoint of the borders of southwest Massachusetts, northwest Connecticut, and eastern New York state, and the high point of Connecticut on its south slope.

Frissell's summit and the majority of its slopes are within Massachusetts' Mount Washington State Forest. Its southern slopes are in Salisbury, Connecticut. The high-point marker for Connecticut is on the border with Massachusetts at 42.049633°N 73.483042°W, at an elevation of 2,379 feet (725 m) along the Mount Frissell Trail, making the hike a popular destination for state highpointers.

The highest summit in Connecticut is Bear Mountain, about 1.3 miles (2.1 km) to the east-southeast of Mount Frissell.

Mount Frissell is bordered by Round Mountain to the southeast, Mount Ashley to the north, and Brace Mountain to the west. It is traversed by the Mount Frissell Trail, which connects with the South Taconic Trail to the west and the Appalachian Trail to the east. The south side of Mount Frissell drains into Riga Lake and South Pond, then into Wachocostinook Brook, Salmon Creek, the Housatonic River, and Long Island Sound. The northwest side drains into Ashley Hill Brook, thence Bash Bish Brook, the Roeliff Jansen Kill, the Hudson River, and Upper New York Bay. The northeast side drains into Sages Ravine, thence into Schenob Brook, the Hubbard Brook, the Housatonic River, and Long Island Sound.

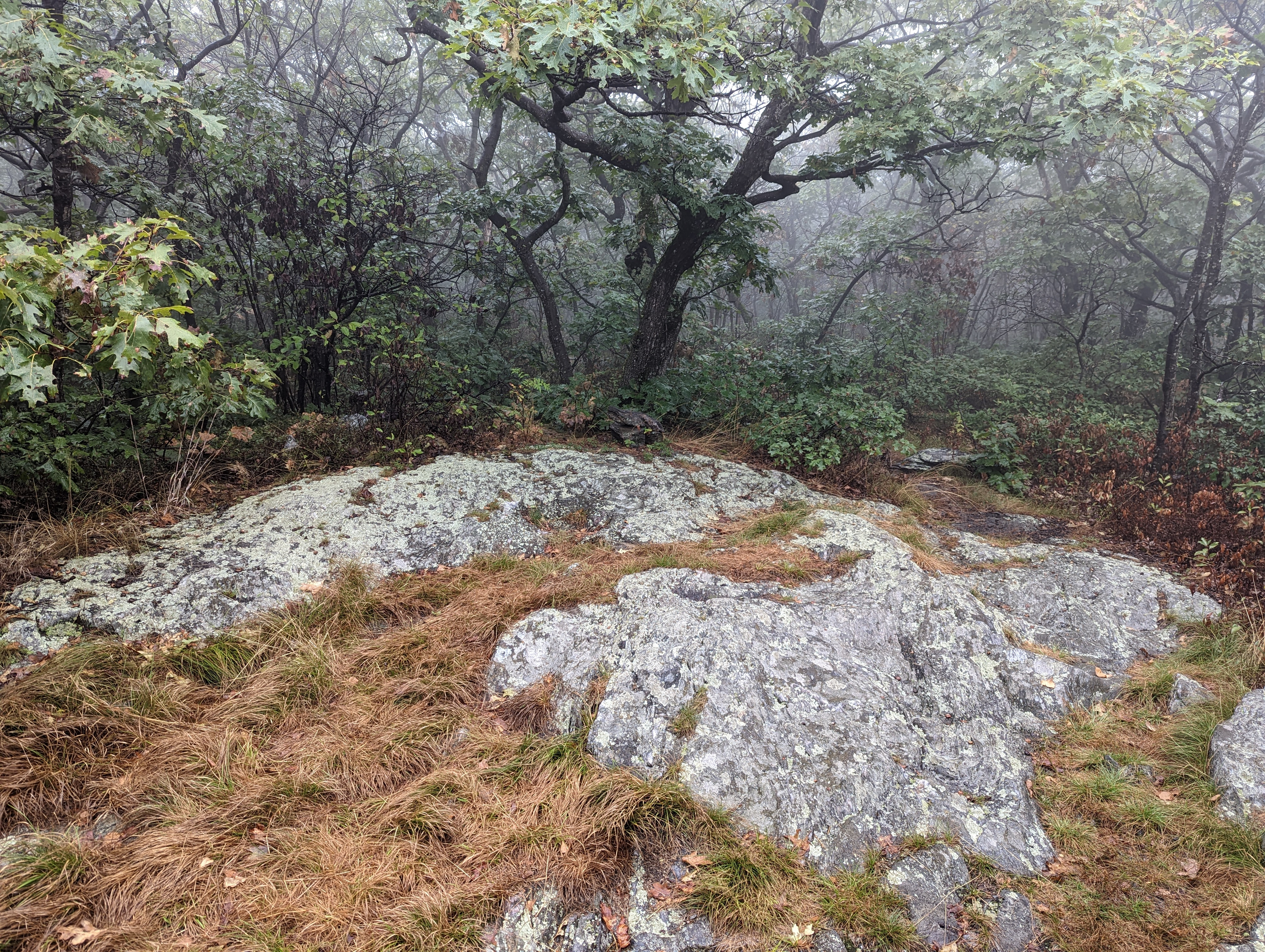
The summit of Mount Frissell

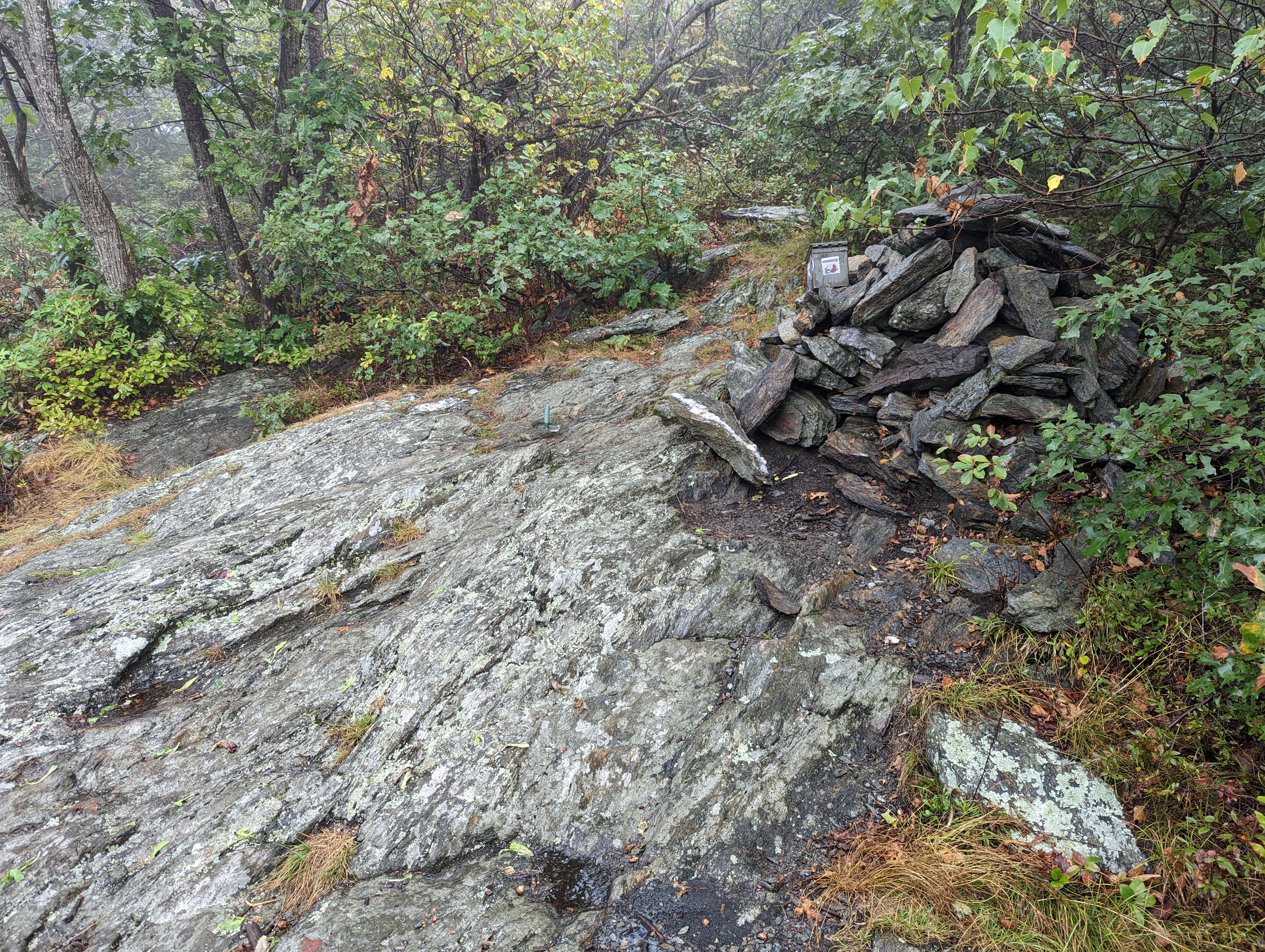
The highest point in Connecticut, on Mount Frissell's south slope

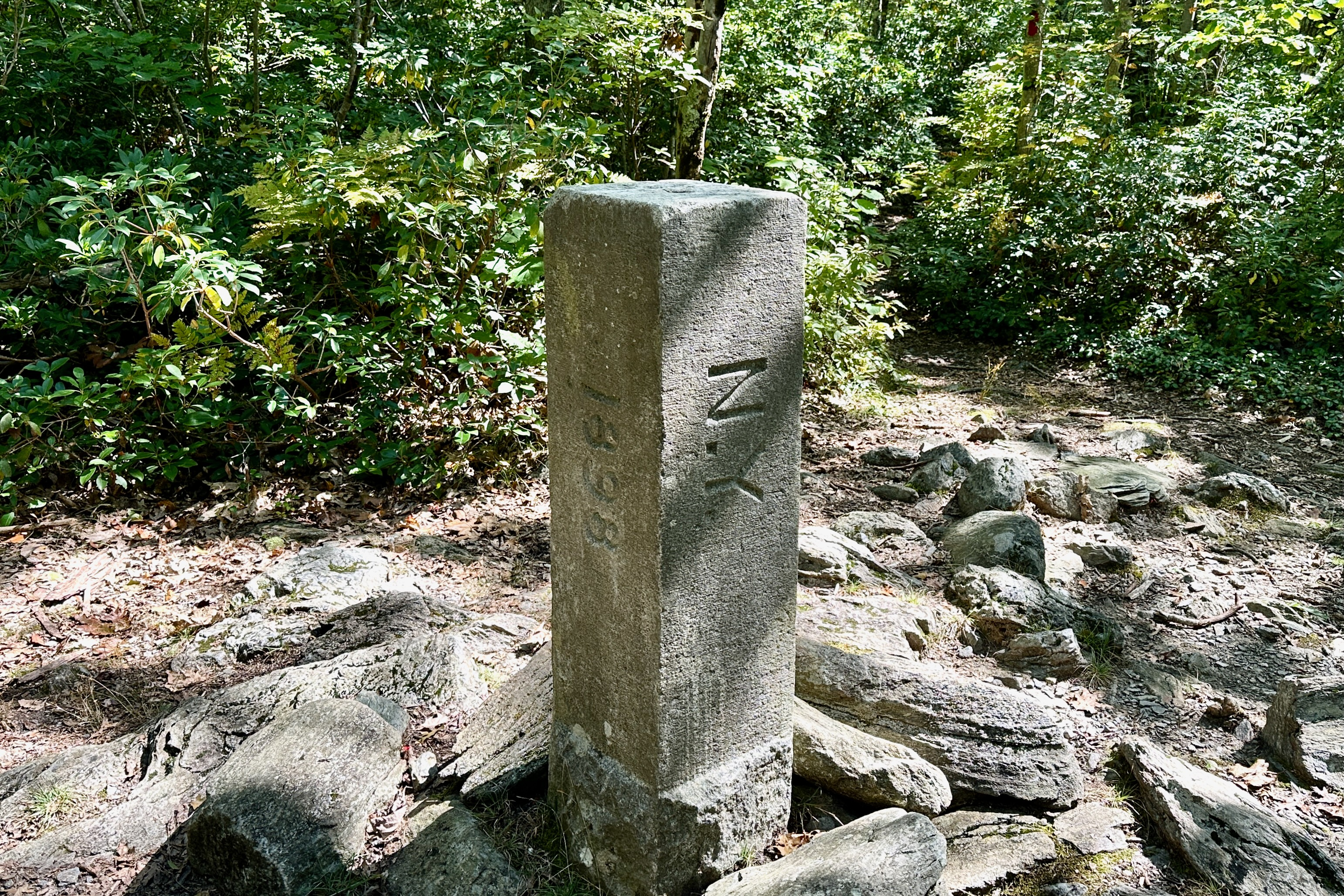
Mount Frissell Trail passing the Connecticut–Massachusetts–New York tri-state marker

== See also ==
- Outline of Connecticut
- Index of Connecticut-related articles
- List of U.S. states by elevation
- Mountain peaks of North America
- Mountain peaks of the United States
