= Swamper =

Swamper may refer to:

- Swamp Yankee, a resident of the swamps of southeastern New England, sometimes called Swampers
- A member of the Muscle Shoals Rhythm Section, informally known as The Swampers
- Swamper (occupational title), slang term which refers to an assistant worker, helper, maintenance person, or someone who performs odd jobs
