= Raggies =

The Raggies are a group of people that live in the northwestern part of the state of Connecticut. Their ancestors were said to be iron workers in the forges on and around Mount Riga in Salisbury, also known as "Mt. Raggie" in the local area. The term "Raggie" generally connotes an economically poorer white person, often of old Yankee stock.
