= Scoville Library =

- Scoville Memorial Library
- U.S. National Register of Historic Places
- U.S. Historic district – Contributing property
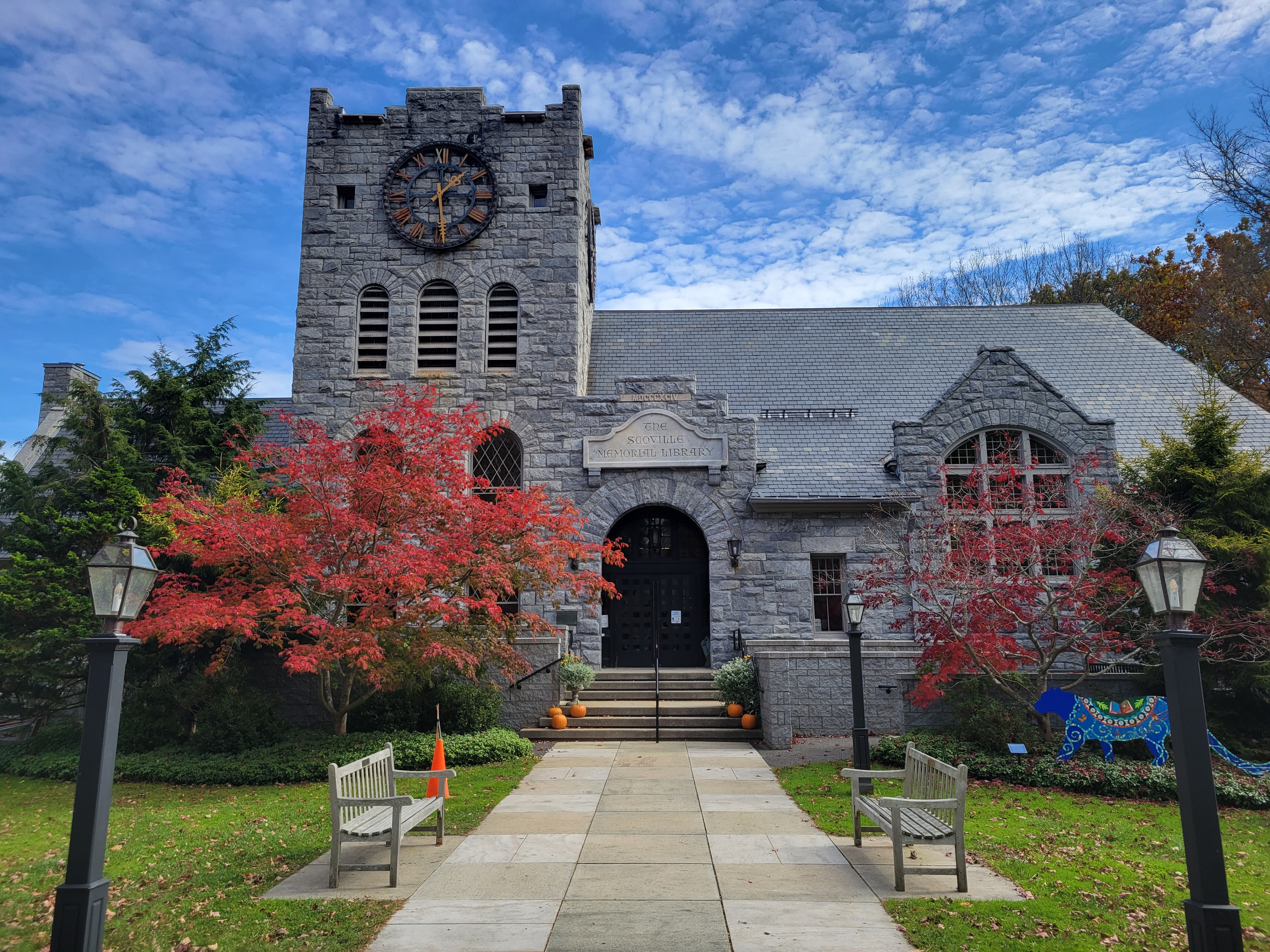

- Location within Connecticut Location within the United States
- Location: Main Street, Salisbury, Connecticut
- Coordinates: 41°58′51″N 73°25′23″W
- Area: 3 acres (1.2 ha)
- Built: 1894
- Architect: Stone, Carpenter & Willson
- Architectural style: Romanesque
- Part of: Salisbury Center Historic District (ID97001115)
- NRHP reference No.: 82004473

Significant dates
- Added to NRHP: April 29, 1982
- Designated CP: September 11, 1997

Scoville Memorial Library is the public library of Salisbury, Connecticut. Established in 1803, it was the first in the United States open to the public free of charge. It is located at 38 Main Street, in an architecturally distinguished Romanesque 1894 building donated by Jonathan Scoville, a local philanthropist. The building was listed on the National Register of Historic Places in 1982.

== History ==
The library collection began in 1771, when Richard Smith, owner of a local blast furnace, used community contributions to buy 200 books in London. Patrons could borrow and return books on the third Monday of every third month. Fees were collected for damages, the most common being "greasing" by wax dripped from the candles by which the patrons read. In 1805, a gift of books from Caleb Bingham, a Salisbury native, created the Bingham Library for Youth, followed by the Church Library, the gift of Miss Harriet Church. In time, these various collections, along with additional purchases, were gathered together and housed at the Town Hall.

On April 9, 1810, a Salisbury town meeting voted to authorize the "selectmen draw upon the town treasurer for the sum of one hundred dollars" to purchase more books for the Scoville Memorial Library collection, making the library the first publicly supported free town library in the United States.

In the early 1890s, Jonathan Scoville, another Salisbury native, left $12,000 in his will for a library building. This bequest, together with contributions from other Scoville family members, financed the construction of a gray marble building, built from native stone quarried near Lion's Head Road. Miss Grace Scoville donated a tower clock, which continues to chime the quarter hours with four, eight, twelve, and sixteen notes from Parsifal.

The original building was designed to serve the town as its library and community center. In addition to a reading room, with children's corner, reference department, and stacks, there was an auditorium with piano, stage, and balcony. Refreshments for various literary and musical events were prepared downstairs in the kitchen and pantries. A 15th-century stone carving, sent by Salisbury Cathedral in England, was placed over the fireplace at the far end of the reading room, where it remains today. The carving depicts a row of 3 quatrefoils. The centermost one contains a shield with a lion facing left, standing on its hind legs. The outermost 2 depict eagles with one wing outstretched inwards.

By 1981, the library had outgrown the space available, and a new rear section was built along the outside walls of the original building, providing room for books, offices, and community events.

== Facilities ==
The library's holdings have now grown to over 30,000 items, including a well-rounded core collection of fiction and nonfiction, books-on-tape and videos, large-print books, reference material and maps, periodicals and newspapers, The Lakeville Journal on microfilm, as well as books from the original collections. In addition the library houses an archive collection with materials related to Salisbury, Lakeville, and Ore Hill history and genealogy, as well as works of art including portraits of members of the Scoville family by Ellen Emmet Rand.

The Scoville Memorial Library is a not-for-profit association and is governed by an independent board of trustees. While it serves as the town's public library, it is funded largely by private donations.

== See also ==
- National Register of Historic Places listings in Litchfield County, Connecticut
