= Salisbury Winter Sports Association =

Sports association in Salisbury, Litchfield

Salisbury Winter Sports Association is a volunteer organization in Salisbury, Litchfield County, Connecticut, founded in 1925. Its home, Satre Hill is the site of the annual Eastern National Ski Jumping competition, and in 2011, it will also be the location of the United States Ski and Snowboard Association Junior Olympics in that sport.

== Mission statement ==
The mission of the Salisbury Winter Sports Association is to acquaint our nearby communities, especially the children, with Nordic ski-jumping and cross-country and Alpine skiing, and to teach the skills necessary for their enjoyment and lifelong pursuit. As part of its mission, SWSA hosts and perpetuates the annual ski-jumping competition on Satre Hill to sustain ski jumping in Salisbury and the Eastern United States.

== History ==
In 1924, John Satre immigrated from Norway to the United States to work as a chauffeur in Salisbury, CT. His brothers, Magnus and Olaf, joined him the following year. That year, they established the Salisbury Outing Club, from which the Salisbury Winter Sports Association developed. On January 29, 1927, the club held its first ski jumping competition with a crowd of over two hundred spectators. In 1933, the Salisbury Outing Club hosted the National Championships. During World War II, the club became inactive, and the ski jump fell into disrepair. In 1945, Salisbury residents regrouped and renamed the Salisbury Outing Club as the Salisbury Winter Sports Association. Following restoration of the ski jump and improvements made to the landing hill and tower in 1950, the SWSA was positioned to host the Eastern National Championships in 1952. That championship has been contested at Satre Hill ever since. 2010 marked the demolition of the SWSA's old main jump, and a major fundraising drive to finance the construction of a new jump compliant with current standards was launched in preparation for hosting both the Eastern National Championships and the USSA Junior Olympics in 2011.
