= Maurice Firuski =

Maurice Firuski (26 June 1894 – 9 February 1978) was an American bookseller.

== Life ==
Firuski was born in New York City and was a 1916 Yale College graduate. He was also a U.S. Navy veteran of World War I.

Firuski became a well-known man of letters. He was considered an authority on Herman Melville, and was fond of wearing a white whale pin on his lapel. He was a distinguished book collector, having a personal collection that numbered somewhere between five and six thousand volumes.

His close friends included several noted literary figures of the early twentieth century, such as Archibald MacLeish, Stephen Vincent Benét, Lewis Mumford, Hilary Masters, and Georges Simenon. He is mentioned prominently in letters to and from various other noted authors and public figures as well, such as George Santayana, Amy Lowell, Lesley Frost Ballantine, and Robert Frost. In his role as book collector and seller, he often advised people (famous or not) as to which editions of an author's work were the best or worst of their kind. In the early 1920s, he operated the Dunster House Bookshop in Cambridge, Massachusetts.

In 1927, Firuski moved to Salisbury, Connecticut, where ran his own bookstore for almost 48 years, until his death at the age of 83. The store was called "The Housatonuc" and specialized in rare, hard-to-find, antiquarian books. He and his bookstore were prominently featured in an article entitled "A Page From An American Dream," by Eleanor Winslow, which appeared in The Courant Magazine on November 29, 1964.

Firuski was also the co-editor (with his ex-wife, Elvia) of The Best Of Boulestin, a collection of recipes by Marcel Boulestin. Co-editor for the book was his ex-wife, Elvia. According to the Courant article, Elvia tested each recipe in her own kitchen, before deciding whether or not to include it in the book.

He also taught history at the Salisbury School for eight years in the 1940s. He was a past president of the Scoville Memorial Library and of the Salisbury Association. Firuski was married five times. Firuski died in Salisbury, Connecticut.

== See also ==
- Antiquarian book trade in the United States
