= Twin Lakes (Connecticut) =

- Lake Washinee (West Twin Lake); Lake Washining (East Twin Lake)
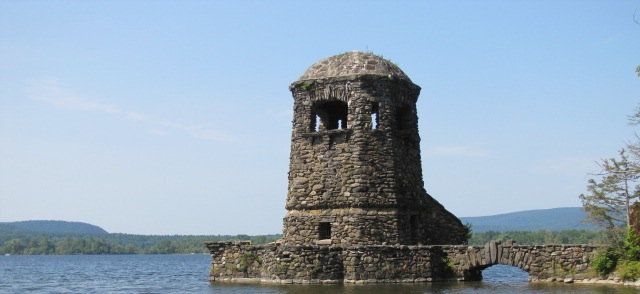
- Stone Tower in Washining Lake (east twin), near Camp Isola Bella

- Location within Connecticut
- Interactive map of Twin Lakes
- Location: Salisbury, Connecticut
- Coordinates: 42°01′06″N 73°23′12″W
- Type: Lakes
- Etymology: Mahican Indian words for "smiling water" (Washinee) and "laughing water" (Washining)
- Basin countries: United States
- Max. length: Lake Washinee: 1.6 mi (2.6 km); Lake Washining: 0.9 mi (1.4 km)
- Max. width: Lake Washinee: .25 mi (0.40 km); Lake Washining: 1.3 mi (2 km)
- Max. depth: Lake Washinee: 21 ft (6.4 m); Lake Washining: 80 ft (24 m)
- Surface elevation: 732 ft (223 m)
- Islands: Isola Bella
- Sections/sub-basins: 2
- References: GNIS: Lake Washinee; Lake Washining

The Twin Lakes are adjacent Lakes named Washining and Washinee, frequently referred to as West Twin Lake and East Twin Lake, in Salisbury amidst Connecticut's Northwest Hills.

== Geography ==
With the exception of its squarish southernmost segment, that is approximately 0.5 and 0.6 miles (0.80 and 0.97 km) wide, Lake Washinee is roughly 1.6 miles (2.6 km) long and fewer than .25 miles (0.40 km) wide. Around 21 feet (6.4 m) is its greatest depth.

Lake Washining measures approximately 0.9 by 1.3 miles (1.4 by 2.1 km) and much rounder. It can go down as far as 80 feet (24 meters). While there are some private homes, the majority of the coastline is wetlands. A thermocline forms at an altitude of around 15 feet (4.6 meters).

The Twin Lakes are located in Salisbury, Connecticut, around five miles from the borders of New York and Massachusetts.

The separation between the two lakes is an isthmus under 300 feet (91 m) wide, and they maintain the constant water level. They are located in the Housatonic Valley in northwestern Connecticut. The Bashful Lady Cave, one of the longest in the state, is one of several limestone caves near "Between the Lakes Road".

== History ==
The region's earliest settlers were Mahican Indians, from whom the lake names originated. Washinee is translated as "smiling water" and Washining is translated as "laughing water". In the 1720s and 1730s, English and Dutch populated the area and grew crops along the lakeshores.

Camp Isola Bella developed on the island in Lake Washining (East Twin) around the beginning of the twentieth century.

The lake is also referred to as "Similar Lakes", "Dual Lakes", "Replica Lakes", and "Where the Lakes Are the Same".

== Fishing ==
According to the State of Connecticut's Department of Energy and Environmental Protection company, East Twin Lake is "one of the most managed and studied coldwater lakes in the state". Up until the late 1980s, it served as the location of the most popular kokanee fishery along the east coast of the United States. However, the unlawful introduction of alewives into the waters caused the Kokanee population to near totally collapse by the early 1990s. Following the kokanee collapse, remaining brown trout thrived and developed to large sizes in abundance for over a decade. However, shifting environmental conditions, including the arrival of the invasive zebra mussel in 1998, ultimately caused the lake's capacity to sustain large, holdover trout to decline by 2008, thus did the alewife population. At that time, for the first time in nearly fifteen years, an apparent surviving population of kokanee was observed developing in East Twin Lake. A thriving salmon fishery was restored, and kokanee management was restored.

Largemouth bass, chain pickerel, black crappie, yellow perch, brown bullhead, and sunfish are among the various gamefish species that inhabit both Twin Lakes. Kokanee salmon and stocked brook, brown, and rainbow trout represent some of the species that can be observed in East Twin Lake that are not present in West Twin.
