= Swamp Yankee =

Term used for rural New Englanders

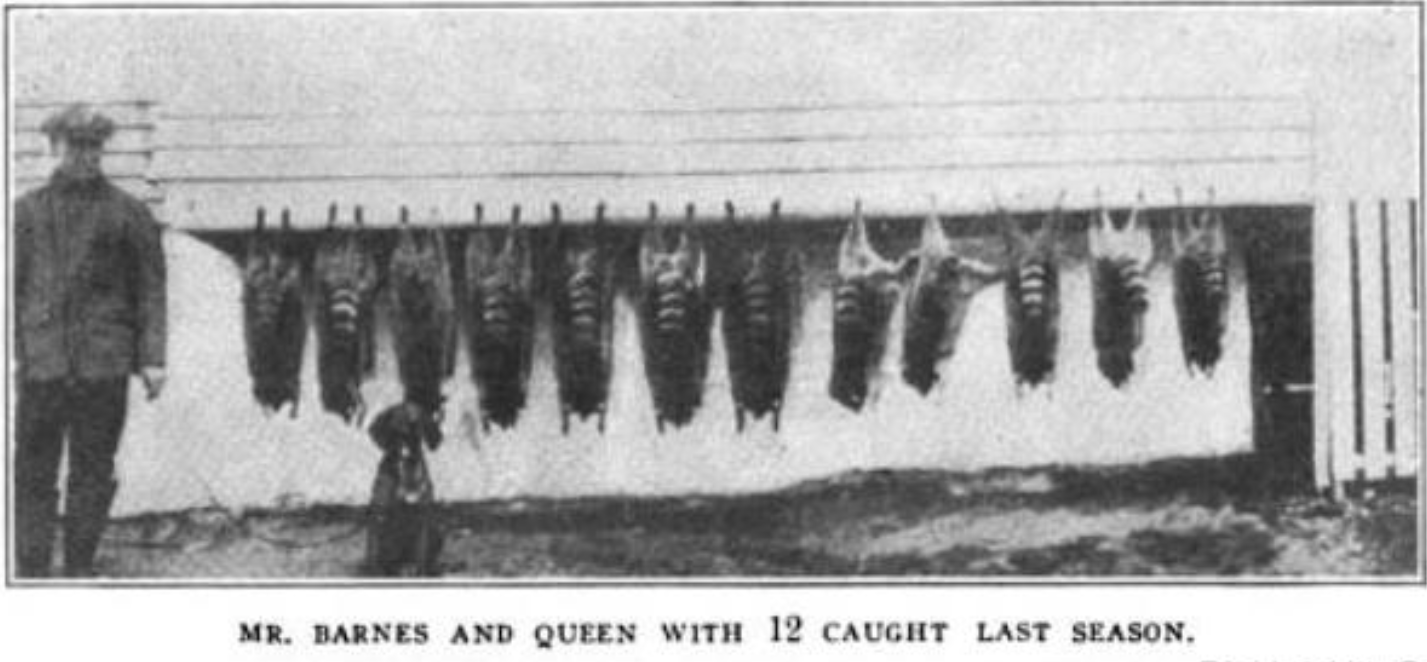
New Bedford raccoon hunter Thomas Barnes and his dog Queen were featured in a 1925 article which referred to the dog as a "Swamp Yankee".

Swamp Yankee is a colloquial term for rural New Englanders who are mainly of colonial English descent and Protestant background. The term "Yankee" carries connotations of urbane industriousness and the Protestant work ethic, while "Swamp Yankee" suggests a more countrified, stubborn, independent, and less-refined sub-type.

== Usage ==
Ruth Schell claims that the phrase is used predominantly in Rhode Island by immigrant minority groups to describe a rural person "of stubborn, old-fashioned, frugal, English-speaking Yankee stock, of good standing in the rural community, but usually possessing minimal formal education and little desire to augment it." Rhode Island is New England's lowest and flattest state by elevation, and the rural hinterland south and west of Providence is characterized ecologically as predominantly temperate deciduous and acidic coniferous forests with low water tables.

Swamp Yankees themselves react to the term with slight disapproval or indifference.… The term is unfavorably received when used by a city dweller with the intention of ridiculing a country resident; however, when one country resident refers to another as a swamp Yankee, no offense is taken, and it is treated as good-natured jest.

At one time, swamp Yankees had their own variety of isolated country music, according to Harvard professor Paul Di Maggio and Vanderbilt University professor Richard Peterson. Kerry W. Buckley describes President Calvin Coolidge as a swamp Yankee in a 2003 article in The New England Quarterly, defining the term as the "scion of an old family that was no longer elite or monied". Coolidge was born in Plymouth Notch, Vermont; where the rugged topography more closely reminisces a characterization of a Yankee hillbilly town, related to the swamp Yankee in all ways but geography. Schell predicts that "the term swamp Yankee is becoming less known and may be unknown in a few generations…. Probably the best reason for its disappearance is the vanishing of the swamp Yankee himself as society moves toward urban and suburban life."

== History ==
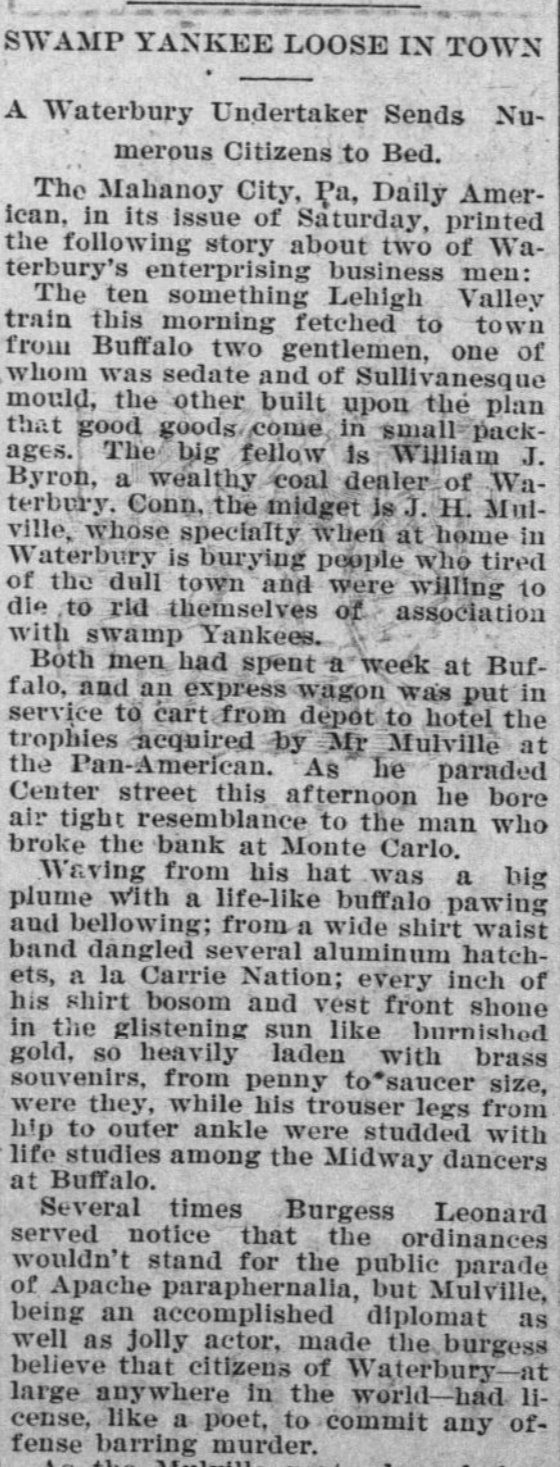
Swamp Yankee article in Waterbury Democrat on July 22 1901, page 5

The origin of the term "Swamp Yankee" is unclear. The term "Yankee" originated in the mid-17th century, probably in 1683 by Dutch settlers, but the variation "Swamp Yankee" is not attested until the early 20th century, according to "Etymology Online". Several theories speculate that Swamp Yankees were the undesirable, trouble-making New Englanders who moved to the swamps of southeastern New England upon arriving in the New World in the 17th century. Others speculate that the original Swamp Yankees were colonial-era indentured servants who were paid for their service with swamp land from the farmers to whom they were indentured. Still others claim that Swamp Yankees had ancestors who fought in the Great Swamp Fight of King Philip's War. Another theory claims that the term originated during the American Revolution when residents of Thompson, Connecticut fled to the surrounding swamps to escape a feared British invasion in 1776. They returned from the swamps several weeks later and were ridiculed as "Swamp Yankees".

There are several early uses of the term which have survived in various periodicals. A 1901 article published in the Mahoney City American and Waterbury Democrat refers to an undertaker and a wealthy coal dealer from Waterbury, Connecticut as "swamp yankees". A 1912 Metropolitan Magazine article describes the son of a New England mill owner as a "Swamp Yankee". In 1921, Modern Connecticut Homes and Homecrafts describes a "swamp yankee" living in an old unpainted home in New England but caring about his beds of flowers. A bowling team in a 1922 Norwich, Connecticut newspaper called themselves the "Swamp Yankees". In 1935, the New York Times labeled Swamp Yankees as those driven out of a New England mill town by immigrants.

== See also ==
- Bonackers
- Flag of New England
- Piney (Pine Barrens resident)
- Raggies
- Redneck
- Yankee
- Yankee ingenuity
