= Satre Hill =

Winter sports venue in Connecticut, US

Satre Hill is a winter sports venue located in Salisbury, Litchfield County, Connecticut. Operated by the all-volunteer Salisbury Winter Sports Association, Satre Hill is the site of ski jumping lessons for young people, and, annually for the United States Eastern Ski Jumping Championships each February. In 2011, it was the site of the ski jumping portion of the United States Ski and Snowboard Association (USSA) Nordic Combined Junior Olympics, the first time this competition has been held in Salisbury. The site is the venue for Annual Jumpfest Winter Festival in Salisbury. It is also a tourist site.

Satre Hill is equipped with 20 metre and 30 metre jumps for training purposes and to introduce area young people to ski jumping. A historic wooden 65 metre jump that had become obsolete was demolished in 2010 and has been replaced with a modern steel structure suitable for future competitions.

The venue draws its name from the Satre brothers, immigrants from Norway, who popularized the sport of ski jumping in the Salisbury area. He jumped from the top of a barn to introduce the sport of ski jumping to the town of Salisbury. First used for ski jumping in the 1920s, the venue was previously a portion of a local farm, with the present landing area having served as a cow pasture. During the warmer months, Satre Hill is also the site for benefits for local not-for-profit organizations.
