= Sandwich printing =

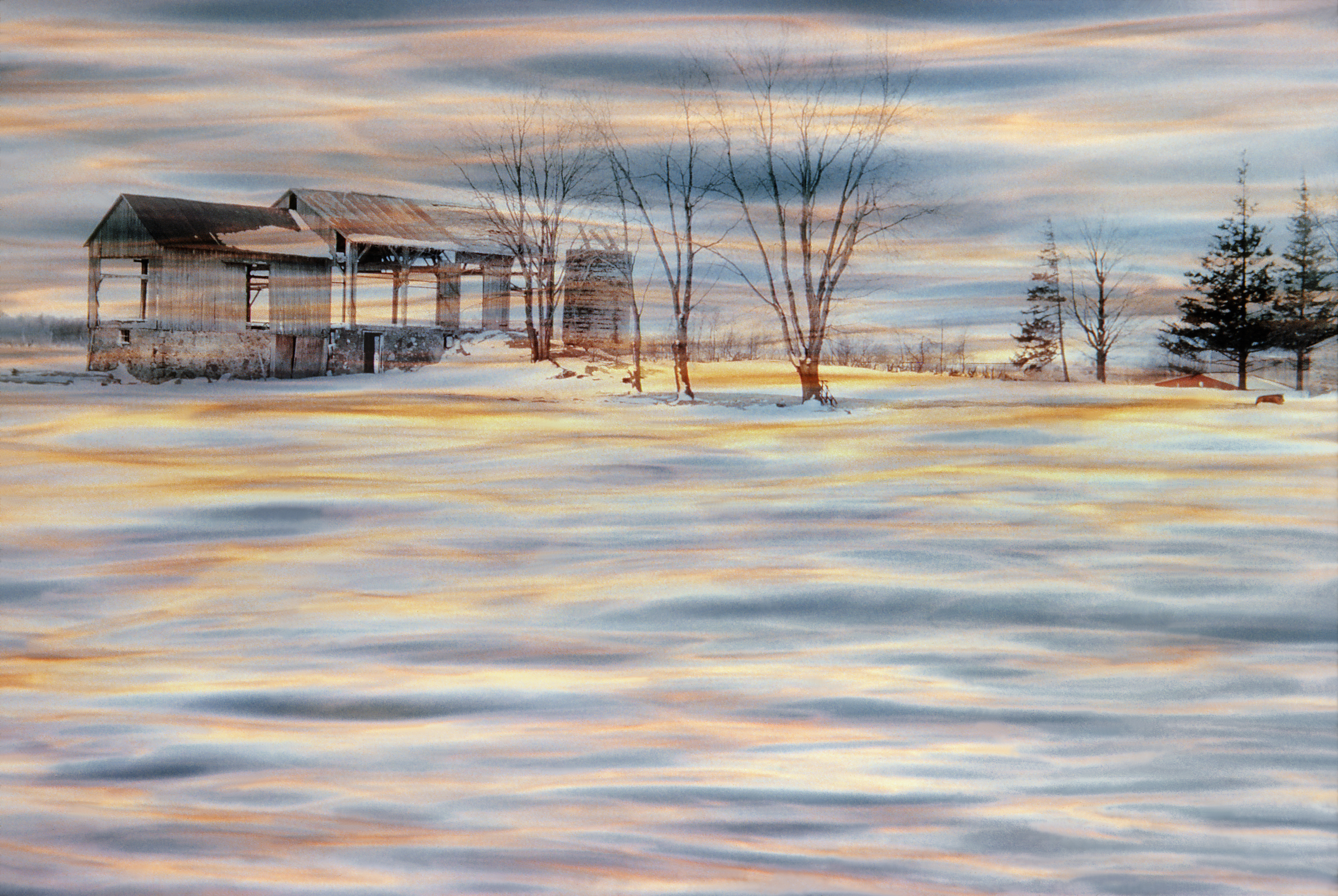
Film sandwich, made by placing (1) transparency of snowy farm on (2) transparency of sunlit rippling water and (3) photographing the result in a lightbox

Sandwich printing is a non-digital photographic technique which combines two negatives or transparencies into a single image.

== Procedure ==
"Sandwiching" may be accomplished by putting one original image on top of the other, placing them into the film carrier of an enlarger, and printing on one sheet of paper. It may also be accomplished by placing the two "sandwiched" originals in a frame on the surface of a lightbox and taking a third photograph of the combination. Sandwich printing is generally used to create a combination of image elements that would not occur naturally in the world. This technique may be used with either black and white or color images.

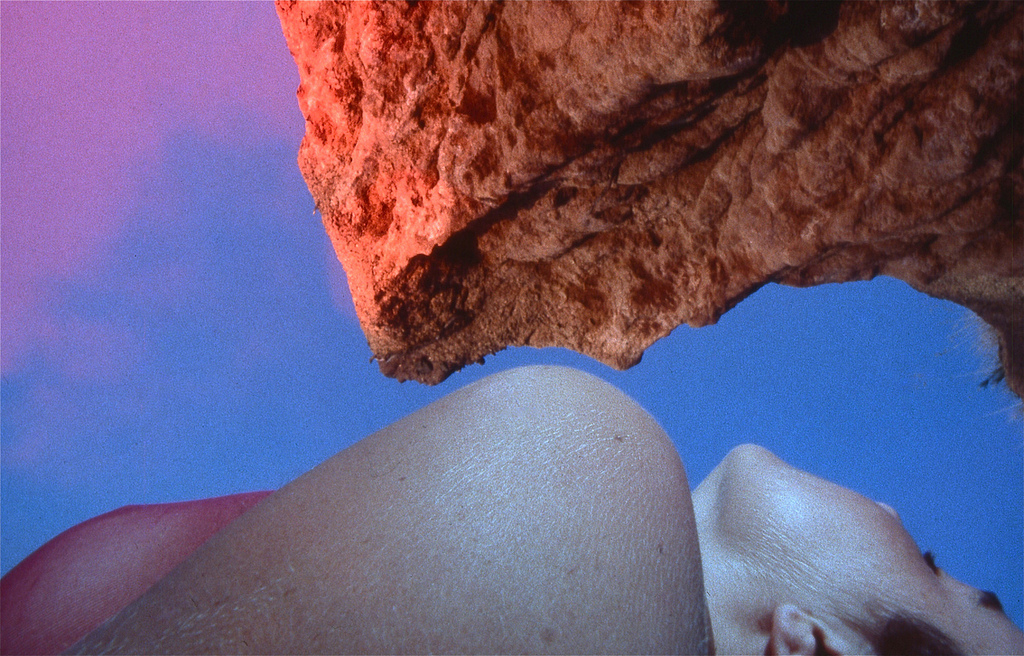
A photo by Augusto De Luca, made using the sandwich technique

In the mid-1970s a technique used by the Italian photographer Augusto De Luca was the sandwich: with the sandwich technique the creative choice occurred after the shot. In fact, the photographer took two already developed slides and superimposed them choosing the combination that best suited him, then rephotographed the whole thing, thus obtaining a single image which was the result of two superimposed images.

When film negatives are used, one image will appear in the shadows of the other image. This occurs as a result of the shadow areas being less dense than the highlighted areas of a negative. The more underexposed the shadows, the more clearly the image from the other negative will shine through. The opposite occurs when using transparencies. The darker areas of one image appear in the highlighted and pale areas of the other image.

== See also ==
- Alpha compositing
- Compositing
- Multiple exposure
