= Mount Riga State Park =

State park in Litchfield County, Connecticut

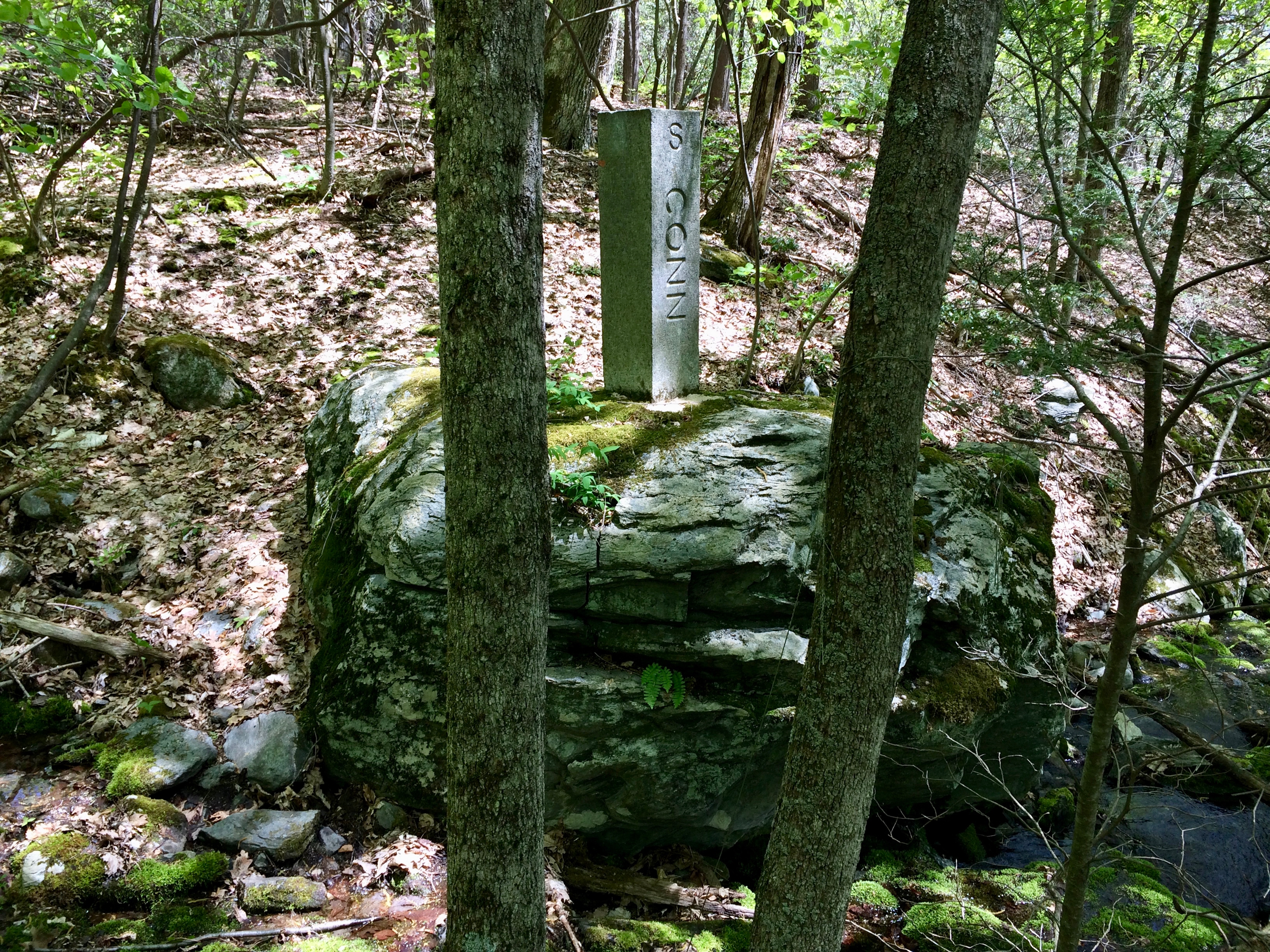
- Connecticut-Massachusetts boundary marker in Sages Ravine near Connecticut Route 41 and Mount Riga State Park

- Location within Connecticut Location within the United States
- Location: Salisbury, Connecticut, United States
- Coordinates: 42°02′07″N 73°26′02″W
- Area: 276 acres (112 ha)
- Elevation: 886 ft (270 m)
- Established: 1954
- Administrator: Connecticut Department of Energy and Environmental Protection
- Designation: Connecticut state park
- Website: Official website

Mount Riga State Park is an undeveloped public recreation area located in the town of Salisbury, Connecticut. The state park offers opportunities for hiking and bow hunting. The Undermountain Trail connects to the northernmost section of the Appalachian Trail in Connecticut from the trail head at Mount Riga State Park's parking lot on Connecticut Route 41. The park is managed by the Connecticut Department of Energy and Environmental Protection.
