= Indian Mountain School =

Coordinates: 41.9373°N 73.467°W

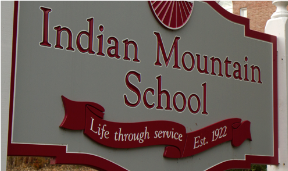
- Lakeville, CT; United States

Information
- Type: Coeducational, Junior Boarding
- Motto: Life Through Service
- Established: 1922
- Headmaster: Lisa Sun
- Enrollment: 252
- Campus: 600 acres (2.4 km^{2})
- Colors: Maroon and gray
- Mascot: Falcons
- Website: indianmountain.org

Indian Mountain School (IMS) is an independent coeducational boarding and day school for children grades pre-K through 9 on two campuses in Lakeville, Connecticut, United States.

The school consists of Lower and Upper campuses. Lower Campus is for children in primary school (pre-K to fourth grade) and Upper Campus for students grades 5 through 9. Boarding is available for students in grades six to nine.

== History ==
In 1916, Francis Behn Riggs purchased land and buildings on the site of the present Upper Campus. Educated at Groton and Harvard, Riggs founded an agricultural high school for boys, the Riggs School. Indian Mountain School took its current name in 1922 when it became a boarding school designed to prepare boys for secondary boarding schools' entrance exams. Classes and dormitory space were in a large building adjacent to and south of the present tennis courts; Hadden House served as a gymnasium and faculty housing. IMS enrolled eight boys in its first year ranging in age from eight to 14.

From these beginnings, Riggs gradually constructed the basis of today's school. His curriculum was traditional but also included such extras as carpentry and dramatics. The motto, "life through service", was adopted from the original Riggs School and applied to the new Indian Mountain School. The farm continued to operate for the benefit of the school kitchen, and boys engaged in an active outdoor life. By 1928, the enrollment had reached 30 boys. In November 1928 the main school building was destroyed by fire but Riggs raised the funds to construct the current brick building in time for the opening of school in September 1929. At the same time, the school was incorporated as a not-for-profit and chartered under the laws of Connecticut to “maintain forever a school for the training and education of boys and young men.” The new building, designed for 40 students and their instructors, was full that fall.

On July 1, 2003, IMS merged with the neighboring pre-kindergarten through fourth grade school formerly known as The Town Hill School.

The Town Hill School began in the 1930s as Mrs. Tracy's school, named for its founder, the wife of a Hotchkiss teacher. In 1938, a group of Hotchkiss parents and others in the community, convinced of the need for a strong elementary school, founded The Town Hill School. Early benefactors provided funds for the original building, and The Hotchkiss School donated the land. The school opened that year with 22 students in grades one through eight. Penelope Oyen was Town Hill's first headmistress. She was assisted by Connie Garrity, who became headmistress in 1942 and served Town Hill until her retirement in 1978.

The original two-room, two-teacher school had eight grades, which were divided into grades one through four and grades five to eight. In 1946, IMS and Town Hill agreed that IMS would begin offering grades five through nine while Town Hill would concentrate on kindergarten through fourth grade. A pre-kindergarten was established for the 1987–1988 school year.

After Garrity retired in 1978, the school had a series of short-lived heads of school until Judy Boynton became Head of School in 1992. Boynton worked closely with trustees, faculty, and parents to increase enrollment, balance the budget, and improve curricular continuity. Enrollment stabilized between 55 and 65 full-time boys and girls. Boynton resigned in 1997.

The school moved to its present 12-acre campus in August 1998. After Boynton left, there was another period of turnover in the heads of school until the 2003 merger with IMS. In 2004, Trish Hochstetter became the Lower School Head while remaining the Learning Skills Specialist on the Lower Campus. She resigned in 2014. Rebekah Jordan is now the Head of the Lower School.

In July 2006, Mark A. Devey became Indian Mountain's eighth Head of School. Under Devey's leadership, enrollment stabilized, the curriculum was further refined, and the school launched a $7 million capital campaign to finance the construction of a new dormitory building with additional faculty housing, (completed in 2012) and a new Student Center (completed in 2014) as well as to add to the school's endowment.

Jody Soja became the ninth Head of School in 2015.

The school incurred allegations of sexual abuse from the 1970s and '80s. Suits were brought in the 1990s and 2010s.

== Arts ==
IMS has an arts program that offers opportunities for all students. The "Electives" program offers courses ranging from Film Production to Digital Photography to Ancient Greek to Monty Python. IMS puts on one musical (in the fall/early winter) and one play (in the winter). More than half the students on the Upper Campus take music lessons and over 70 students take guitar. The Mountain Voices is a co-ed singing group for eighth & ninth graders. For those not particularly interested in learning an instrument, there is Music Appreciation.

== Athletics ==
IMS has a gymnasium, seven playing fields, and three all-weather tennis courts to accommodate IMS athletes. A paddle tennis court is used for recreational purposes. During the winter, athletes use the gymnasium, swimming pool, basketball and squash courts, and ice hockey rinks at The Hotchkiss School. Additionally, ski teams train and compete at Catamount Ski Area.

== Notable alumni ==
- John G. Avildsen – director of The Karate Kid, The Karate Kid II, Rocky, Rocky V, Lean on Me, and The Power of One
- Douglas Tompkins – environmentalist, co-founder of two clothing companies: The North Face and ESPRIT. Owner of around two million acres (810,000 ha) of land in South America, primarily dedicated to conservation
- Addison O'Dea—Documentary filmmaker

== See also ==
- Preparatory school
