= Bear Mountain (Connecticut) =

Mountain in Salisbury, Connecticut

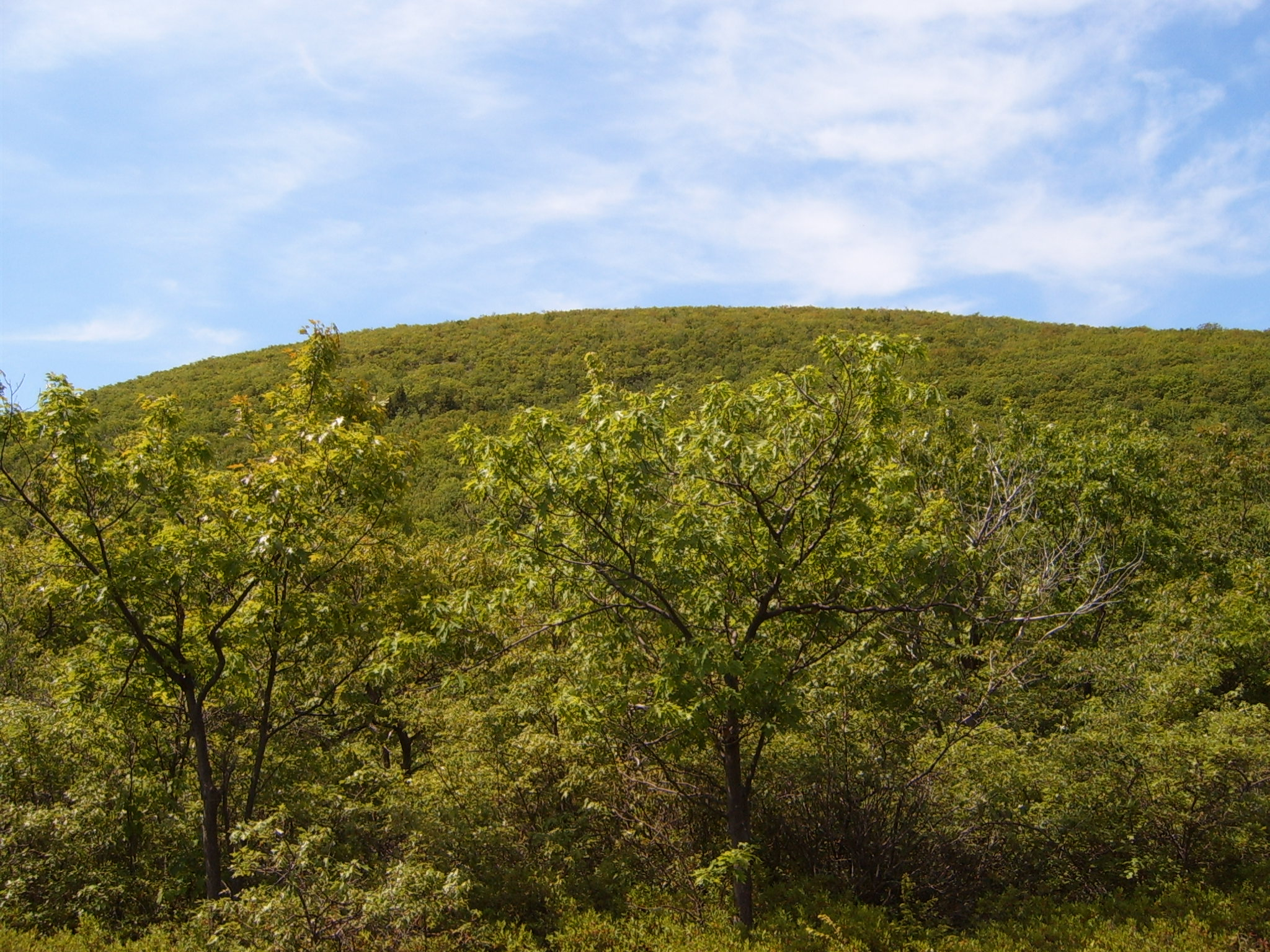
- Bear Mountain

Highest point
- Elevation: 2,316 ft (706 m)
- Prominence: 447 ft (136 m)
- Parent peak: Mount Frissell
- Coordinates: 42°02′41″N 73°27′16″W

Geography
- Location: Litchfield County, Connecticut, U.S.
- Parent range: Taconic Mountains
- Topo map: USGS Ashley Falls

Geology
- Rock age: Ordovician
- Mountain type(s): Thrust fault; metamorphic rock

Climbing
- Easiest route: Appalachian Trail

Bear Mountain is a peak of the southern Taconic Mountains in Salisbury, Connecticut. At 2,316 feet (706 m), Bear Mountain is the highest mountain that lies wholly within Connecticut. However, it is not the state highpoint: in the 1940s, the United States Geological Survey determined that the highest elevation in the state, at 2,380 feet (725 m), was actually on the nearby Connecticut-Massachusetts border, on the southern slope of Massachusetts’ Mount Frissell. There is a stone monument on the Bear Mountain summit. The Appalachian Trail crosses the mountain in a generally north–south direction.

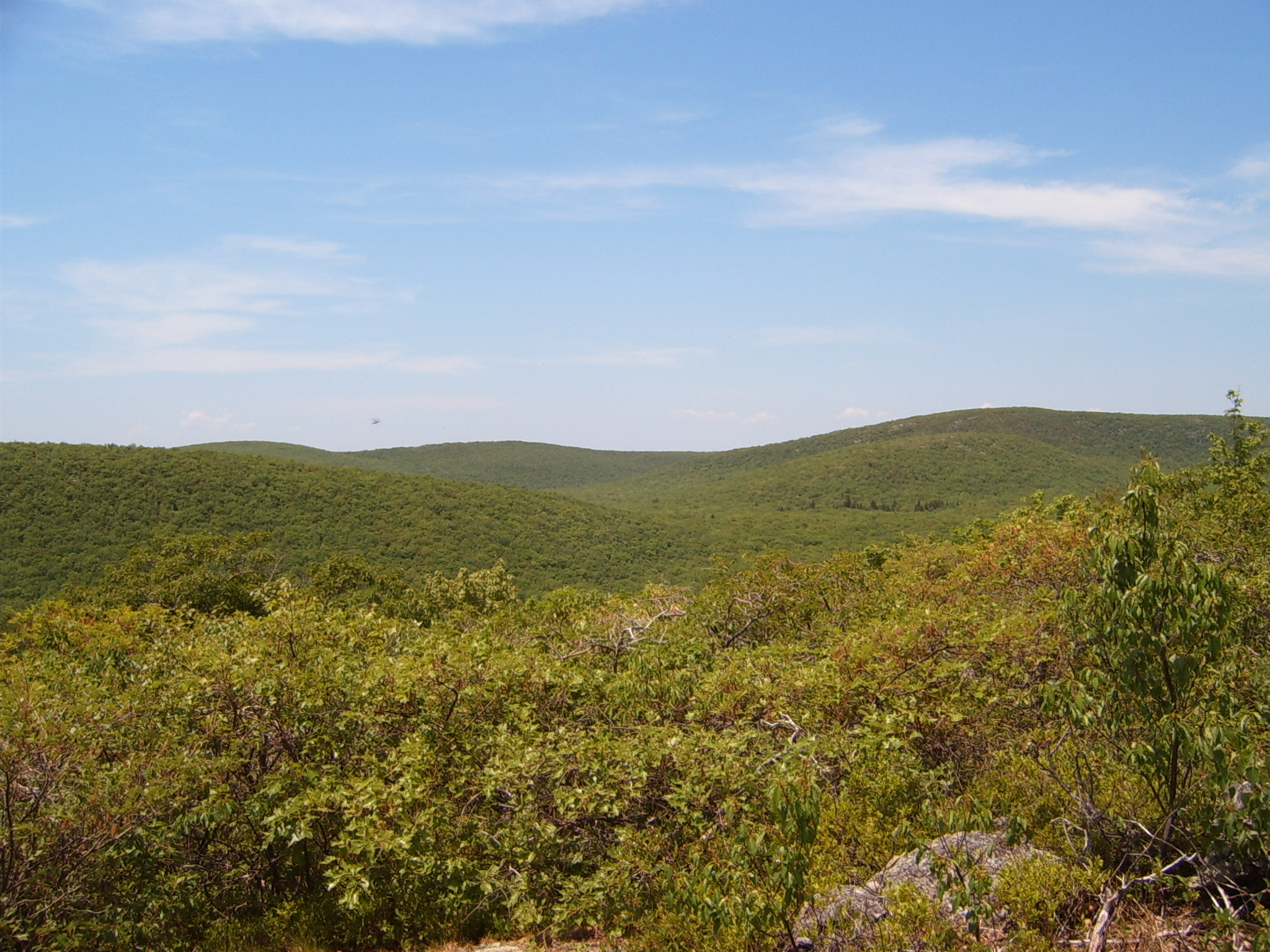
Mount Frissell, which contains Connecticut's high point on its southern slope, seen from Bear Mountain

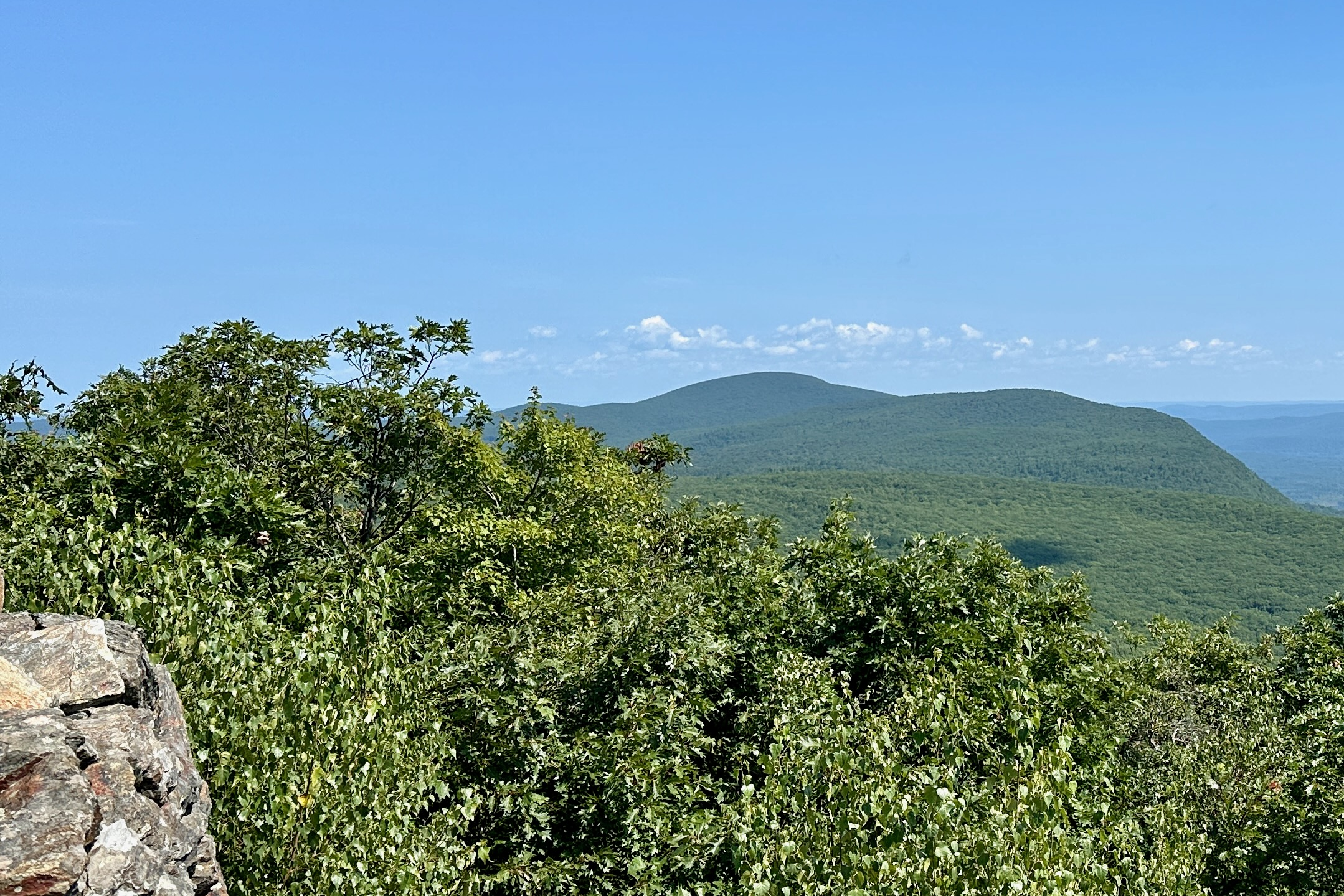
View of Mount Everett and Mount Race from Bear Mountain

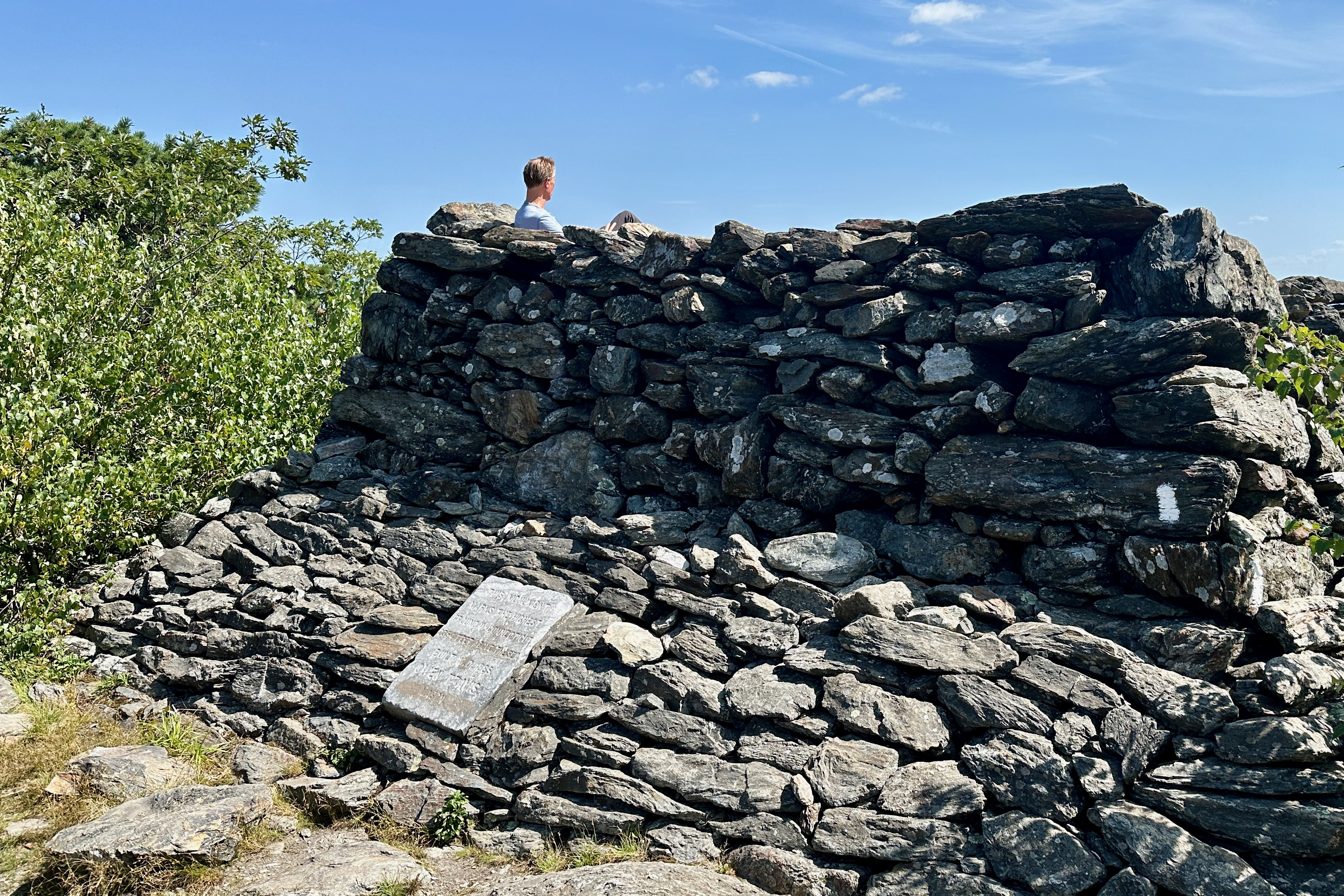
Stone monument at the summit of Bear Mountain
