= Lake Wononscopomuc =

- Location within Connecticut
- Location: Lakeville, Salisbury, Connecticut, United States
- Coordinates: 41.956°N 73.446°W
- Type: marl lake
- Surface area: 348 acres (141 ha)
- Average depth: 36 feet (11 m)
- Max. depth: 102 feet (31 m)

Lake Wononscopomuc is a lake located in the Lakeville section of Salisbury, Connecticut, United States. It has the distinction of being the deepest natural lake in the state. Wononskopumuc is a Mahican name for "rocks at the bend in the lake."

Also known as Wononskopomuc Lake or Lakeville Lake, Lake Wononscopomuc is a natural, marl lake that supports a diverse community of aquatic plants. The town beach and a boat launch, known collectively as the Salisbury Town Grove, are on the lake’s north shore. The boathouse and private beach of the Hotchkiss School are on the lake's south shore.

Access to the 348 acres (141 ha) lake is monitored because of fears that the invasive zebra mussel will be introduced on boats or trailers from nearby Twin Lakes. The area around the lake is residentially developed, although the houses are on large lots, and most are set far back from the lake behind tree buffers. The maximum depth of the lake is 102 feet (31 m), and mean depth is 36 feet (11 m).
