= William Wise (author) =

American writer of children's literature (born 1923)

- Born: William Alfred Wise; July 21, 1923 (age 103); New York City, U.S.
- Education: Yale University
- Occupation: Writer
- Writing career
- Genre: Children's literature

William Alfred Wise (born July 21, 1923) is an American writer of children's literature. Among his well-known books are Christopher Mouse: The Tale of a Small Traveller (2004) and Ten Sly Piranhas (1993).

== Life and education ==
Born in New York City on July 21, 1923, Wise graduated from Lawrenceville School in 1941 where he was editor-in-chief of literary magazine, The Lit, and also wrote for school newspaper, The Lawrence. Wise received a bachelor's degree from Yale University in 1948 and published his first children's book, Jonathan Blake: The Life and Times of a Very Young Man, in 1956.

== Writings ==
In addition to storybooks, Wise also published an abundance of children’s nonfiction, including In the Time of the Dinosaurs (1963), Monsters from Outer Space? (1978), and Zany Zoo (2006), as well as several biographies of important historical figures such as Albert Einstein, Alexander Hamilton, Franklin Delano Roosevelt, and Booker T. Washington. Wise also wrote the children's poetry collections No Sign of Santa! (1987) and Dinosaurs Forever (2000).

Wise's career was not limited to children's literature; he also wrote several books for an adult audience, including Massacre at Mountain Meadows (1976) a book about the Mountain Meadows Massacre of 1857 that explores the consequences of religious fanaticism. In 1980, Wise published The Amazon Factor, an installation of Harlequin’s “Raven House” mystery series. He also co-wrote the teleplays Kasrilekva on the Mississippi (1955), The Enemy (1956), and A World Full of Strangers (1958) with James Yaffe.

== Bibliography ==
=== Children's literature ===
==== Fiction ====
- Jonathan Blake: The Life and Times of a Very Young Man (1956)
- The House with the Red Roof (1961)
- The Story of Mulberry Bend (1963)
- Ten Sly Piranhas: A Counting Story in Reverse (A Tale of Wickedness—and Worse!) (1993)
- Nell of Branford Hall (1999)
- Christopher Mouse: The Tale of a Small Traveller (2004, illustrated by Patrick Benson)

==== Nonfiction ====
===== Biography and history =====
- Silversmith of Old New York: Myer Myers (1958)
- Alber Einstein: Citizen of the World (1960)
- Alexander Hamilton (1963)
- Two Reigns of Tutankhamen (1964)
- The Spy and General Washington (1965)
- Franklin Delano Roosevelt (1967)
- Aaron Burr (1968)
- Booker T. Washington (1968)
- Cities, Old and New (1973)
- Monster Myths of Ancient Greece (1981)

===== Science =====
- In the Time of the Dinosaurs (1963)
- The World of Giant Mammals (1965)
- The Amazing Animals of Latin America (1969)
- The Amazing Animals of Australia (1970)
- Giant Snakes and Other Amazing Reptiles (1970)
- Monsters from Outer Space? (1978)

==== Poetry collections ====
- No Sign of Santa! (1987)
- Dinosaurs Forever (2000)

=== Literature for adults ===
==== Nonfiction ====
- Secret Mission to the Philippines: The Story of the "Spyron" and the American-Filipino Guerillas of World War II (1968)
- Killer Smog: The World's Worst Air Pollution Disaster (1970)
- Massacre at Mountain Meadows: An American Legend and a Monumental Crime (1976)

==== Fiction ====
- The Amazon Factor (1981)
