= Schenob Brook =

River in the United States of America

Coordinates: 42.114°N 73.352°W

Schenob Brook is a stream in Berkshire County, Massachusetts and Litchfield County, Connecticut, in the United States. Variant names are Kisnop Brook, Schenop Brook, and Skerrob Brook.

Schenob Brook flows generally northward from Washinee Lake in Salisbury, CT, and merges with Hubbard Brook in Sheffield, MA which then flows into the Housatonic River a quarter mile downstream.

The stream was named for John Sconnoup, an early settler of Dutch descent.

== See also ==
- List of rivers of Connecticut
- List of rivers of Massachusetts
