= Lime Rock, Connecticut =

- Lime Rock Historic District
- U.S. National Register of Historic Places
- U.S. Historic district
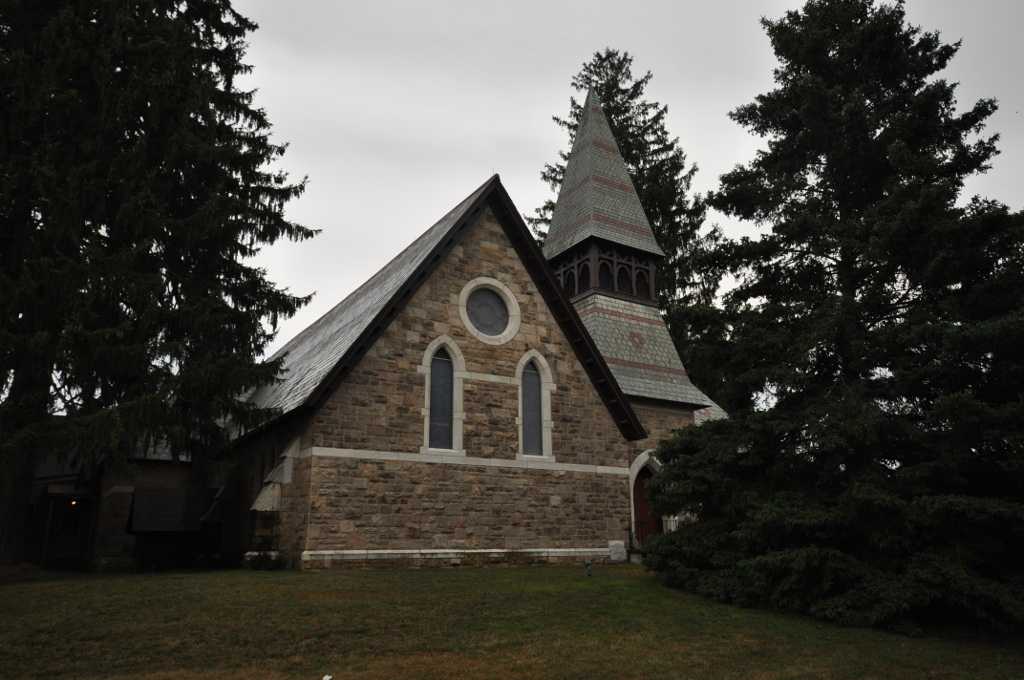

- Location within Connecticut Location within the United States
- Location: Roughly White Hollow, Elm, Lime Rock, Norton Hill and Furnace Roads, Salisbury, Connecticut
- Coordinates: 41°56′4″N 73°23′27″W
- Area: 120 acres (49 ha)
- Architect: Upjohn, Richard
- Architectural style: Greek Revival, Stick/Eastlake, Queen Anne
- NRHP reference No.: 84001064
- Added to NRHP: July 5, 1984

Lime Rock is a village and historic district (listed as Lime Rock Historic District) in the town of Salisbury, Connecticut, United States, situated on the Salmon Kill. The village center and the historic district are substantially similar. The surrounding area is also generally referred to as Lime Rock.

== History ==
Formerly known as "The Hollow", Lime Rock became a center of the iron industry with the establishment by Thomas Lamb of a forge in the village around 1734. As the iron industry expanded, Lime Rock later became the home of the Barnum and Richardson Company, which made it the capital of the historic iron industry of the upper Housatonic Valley. U.S. Senator William Henry Barnum, the chief executive of Barnum and Richardson and longest serving Chairman of the Democratic National Committee, resided in Lime Rock, and was the founder of Trinity Episcopal Church Trinity Lime Rock. He, along with many other personages of the area's historic iron industry, is buried in the Lime Rock Cemetery.

By 1923, Barnum and Richardson had closed its eastern works, which went bankrupt. Initially the village was largely abandoned, but by 1927 it had become the home of an artist colony, the Lime Rock Artists Association, which hosted major exhibits in the village in each of the nine years from 1927 through 1935. The original historic village is still largely intact.

In 1946, Alfred Korzybski moved the Institute of General Semantics from Chicago to the former Richardson mansion in Lime Rock where he directed it until his death in 1950. The Institute remained in Lime Rock until 1981 when it moved elsewhere.

Today Lime Rock is best known as the location of the automobile racing course at Lime Rock Park.

== See also ==
- National Register of Historic Places listings in Litchfield County, Connecticut
