= Lakeville, Connecticut =

Census-designated place in Connecticut, United States

- Census-designated place
- Location in Litchfield County, Connecticut
- Coordinates: 41°57′52″N 73°26′27″W
- State: Connecticut
- County: Litchfield
- Town: Salisbury
- Named for: Wononskopomuc Lake

Government
  - Type: City Council

Area
  - Total: 3.69 sq mi (9.57 km^{2})
  - Land: 3.15 sq mi (8.16 km^{2})
  - Water: 0.55 sq mi (1.42 km^{2})
- Elevation: 720 ft (220 m)

Population (2010)
  - Total: 928
  - Density: 294/sq mi (113.7/km^{2})
- ZIP Code: 06039
- FIPS code: 09-41830
- GNIS feature ID: 208366

Lakeville is a census-designated place (CDP) in Litchfield County, Connecticut, United States, close to Dutchess County, New York. It is within the town of Salisbury, but has its own ZIP Code (06039). As of the 2020 census, Lakeville had a population of 1,059. The Hotchkiss School is in Lakeville, and the Indian Mountain School is nearby.

== Geography ==
Lakeville is in the southwestern part of the town of Salisbury, on U.S. Route 44, 1.5 miles (2.4 km) southwest of the Salisbury town center. US 44 leads northeast 8 miles (13 km) to Canaan village and west 4 miles (6 km) to Millerton, New York.

According to the U.S. Census Bureau, the Lakeville CDP has an area of 3.7 square miles (9.6 km^{2}), of which 3.2 square miles (8.2 km^{2}) is land and 0.54 square miles (1.4 km^{2}), or 14.8%, is water. Most of the water area is part of Lake Wononscopomuc, the state's deepest natural lake.

== Demographics ==
=== 2020 census ===
As of the 2020 census, Lakeville had a population of 1,059. The median age was 50.2 years. 18.6% of residents were under the age of 18 and 25.6% of residents were 65 years of age or older. For every 100 females there were 86.4 males, and for every 100 females age 18 and over there were 87.4 males age 18 and over.

0.0% of residents lived in urban areas, while 100.0% lived in rural areas.

There were 438 households in Lakeville, of which 17.4% had children under the age of 18 living in them. Of all households, 49.8% were married-couple households, 19.2% were households with a male householder and no spouse or partner present, and 26.3% were households with a female householder and no spouse or partner present. About 33.1% of all households were made up of individuals and 16.9% had someone living alone who was 65 years of age or older.

There were 645 housing units, of which 32.1% were vacant. The homeowner vacancy rate was 3.7% and the rental vacancy rate was 18.4%.

Racial composition as of the 2020 census
Race	Number	Percent
White	915	86.4%
Black or African American	20	1.9%
American Indian and Alaska Native	1	0.1%
Asian	18	1.7%
Native Hawaiian and Other Pacific Islander	0	0.0%
Some other race	23	2.2%
Two or more races	82	7.7%
Hispanic or Latino (of any race)	61	5.8%

== History ==
Until 1846, Lakeville was called "Furnace Village", due to the location there of one of the early blast furnaces of the historic Salisbury iron industry (one of which was established in the 1760s by future Revolutionary War hero Ethan Allen. Benjamin B. Hotchkiss, inventor of the Hotchkiss gun, was born in nearby Watertown. A boarding school in his name, the Hotchkiss School, was founded by his widow Maria Bissell Hotchkiss in Lakeville in 1891. It later became coeducational. The Indian Mountain School, a boarding school for students Pre-K through 9th, is south of the Lakeville CDP. It was founded in 1922.

Lakeville was the original home to what eventually relocated and became the Mansfield Training School, an institution for intellectually challenged residents of Connecticut from 1860 to 1993.

=== Other notable events ===
Lakeville is the site of Connecticut's oldest cold case. Camp Sloane camper Connie Smith left the camp on Indian Mountain Road on the morning of July 16, 1952. She was ten years old and from Sundance, Wyoming; she was the granddaughter of former Wyoming Governor Nels H. Smith. Several people observed Connie walking and hitchhiking toward the center of Lakeville. She was last seen walking along Route 44 near the intersection of Belgo Road. Connie's disappearance sparked one of the largest searches ever conducted by the Connecticut State Police. She was never found and foul play is suspected. The case remains open and still has a detective assigned to it.

== Local institutions ==
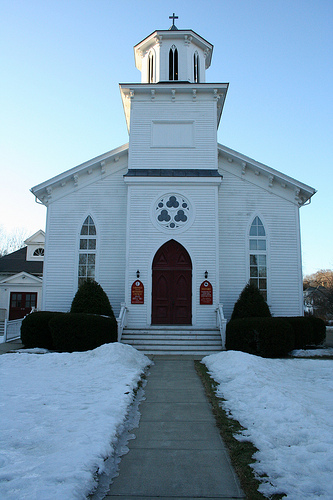
Lakeville United Methodist Church

New England's oldest Methodist congregation is in Lakeville.

Lime Rock Park, 4 miles (6 km) southeast of Lakeville, is a motorsport race track that hosts sports car and stock car races.

YMCA Camp Sloane is in Connecticut, between Indian Mountain Road and Lake Wononpakook, and has operated there since 1928.

== Education ==
It is in the Salisbury School District.

== Notable people ==
- Jill Clayburgh, actress
- Wanda Landowska, musician
- Wassily Leontief, Nobel Economics laureate
- Lot Norton, state politician
- William A. Prendergast (1867–1954), businessman and politician
- Lily Rabe, actress
- MacKenzie Scott, philanthropist
- Artie Shaw, bandleader
- Georges Simenon, author. The town forms the background for his novel La Mort de Belle (The Death of Belle), later adapted to film as The End of Belle
- Rip Torn, actor
