= Salisbury, Connecticut =

- Town
- Town of Salisbury
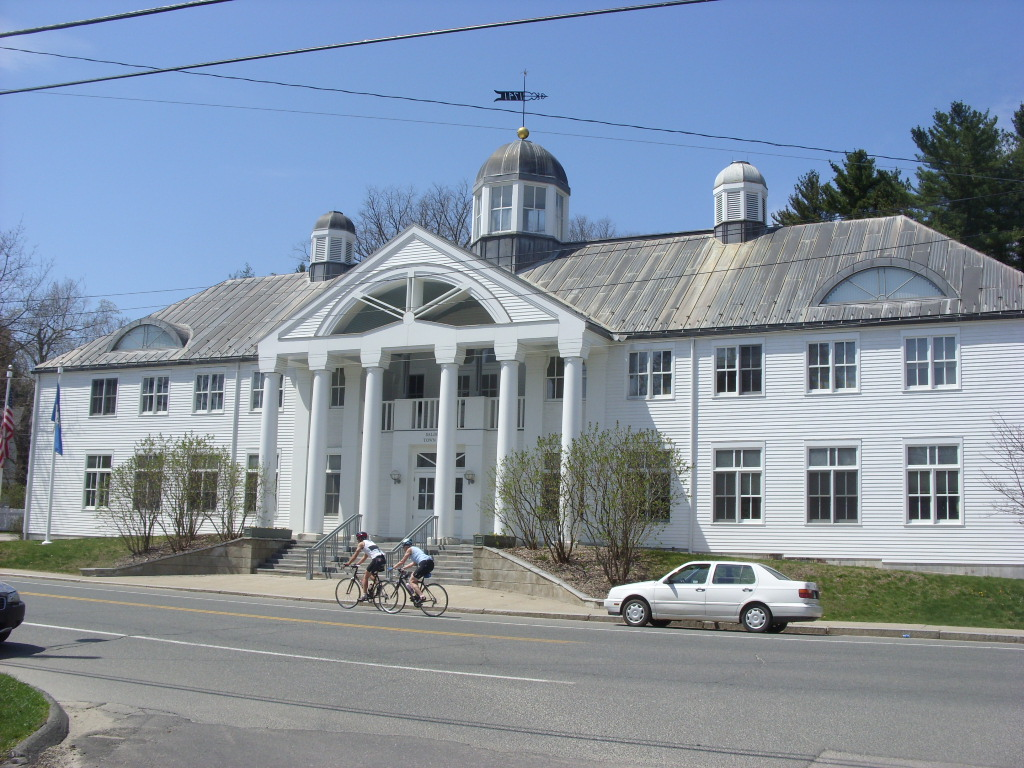
- Salisbury Town Hall

- Seal

- Coordinates: 41°59′06″N 73°25′20″W
- Country: United States
- U.S. state: Connecticut
- County: Litchfield
- Region: Northwest Hills
- Established / Incorporated: 1741

Government
  - Type: Selectman-town meeting
  - First selectman: Curtis G. Rand (D)
  - Selectman: Chris Williams (D)
  - Selectman: Don Mayland (R)

Area
  - Total: 60.1 sq mi (155.6 km^{2})
  - Land: 57.3 sq mi (148.3 km^{2})
  - Water: 2.8 sq mi (7.3 km^{2})
- Elevation: 699 ft (213 m)

Population (2020)
  - Total: 4,194
  - Density: 73.25/sq mi (28.28/km^{2})
- Time zone: UTC-5 (Eastern)
  - Summer (DST): UTC-4 (Eastern)
- ZIP codes: 06039, 06068 06079
- Area codes: 860/959
- FIPS code: 09-66420
- GNIS feature ID: 0213500
- Website: salisburyct.us

Salisbury (/ˈsɑːlzbɛri/) is a town situated in Litchfield County, Connecticut, United States. The town is the northwesternmost in the state of Connecticut; the Connecticut-Massachusetts-New York tri-state marker is located at the northwestern corner of the town. The population was 4,194 at the 2020 census. The town is part of the Northwest Hills Planning Region.

== History ==
Salisbury was established and incorporated in 1741, and contains several historic homes, though some were replaced by larger modern structures in the late 20th century. Salisbury was named for Salisbury, a city in England. Historian Ed Kirby relates that traces of iron were discovered in what was to become Salisbury in 1728, with the discovery of the large deposit at Old Hill (later Ore Hill) in 1731 by John Pell and Ezekiel Ashley. From before the American Revolution, through the Federal Period of the nation, and until circa 1920, Salisbury was the seat of an important iron industry.

Additional iron mines were opened, mostly in the western end of the town, although historian Diana Muir dismisses them as "scarcely big enough to notice," with the further disadvantage of not being near a river large enough to ship iron to market at a reasonable cost. The solution, according to Muir, was to pour labor into the iron, working it into a quality of wrought iron so high that it could be used even for gun barrels. This fetched a high price and made Salisbury iron the celebrated choice of Connecticut's early nineteenth-century arms industry as well as the preeminent source of cast-iron railroad car wheels until they were superseded by steel wheels. Peter P. Everts, an agent of the mid-19th-century mines, however, stated the quality of Salisbury iron varied. The iron industry in Salisbury became inactive following World War I, a plan to revive it during World War II was never implemented, and the mines remain under water.

Scoville Library in Salisbury was the first in the United States open to the public free of charge. Salisbury is also home to the oldest Methodist church in New England, the Lakeville Methodist Church, constructed in 1789.

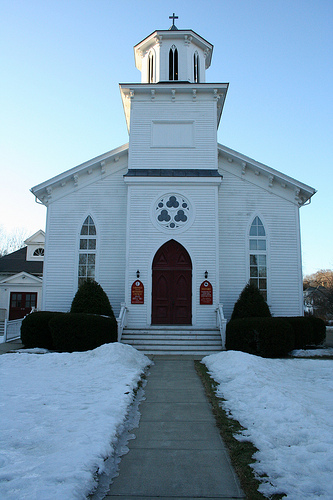
Lakeville United Methodist Church

== Geography ==
Salisbury occupies the northwest corner of Litchfield County and the state of Connecticut. It is bordered to the north by Berkshire County, Massachusetts, and to the west by Dutchess County, New York. Salisbury is 49 miles (79 km) northwest of Hartford, Connecticut's capital; 38 miles (61 km) south of Pittsfield, Massachusetts; and 39 miles (63 km) northeast of Poughkeepsie, New York.

According to the United States Census Bureau, the town has a total area of 60.1 square miles (155.6 km^{2}), of which 57.3 square miles (148.3 km^{2}) are land and 2.8 square miles (7.3 km^{2}), or 4.72%, are water. Within Salisbury there are several ponds and six lakes: Wononscopomuc, Washinee, Washining, Wononpakook, Riga Lake and South Pond. The Housatonic River forms the eastern boundary of the town. Although the summit of Mount Frissell lies in Massachusetts at an elevation of 2,453 feet (748 m), the south slope of the mountain in Salisbury, is the highest point in Connecticut at 2,380 feet (730 m).

=== Principal communities ===
The town of Salisbury includes the CDP of Lakeville, and the hamlets of Amesville, Lime Rock, Salisbury, and Taconic (formerly Chapinville). Taconic is located in the northern section of Salisbury and is a seasonal community of approximately 200 in population, with a town green and US post office. Historically the areas of Joyceville, Ore Hill, Hammertown, Weatogue and Twin Lakes were recognized as separate communities but are no longer.

== Demographics ==
Historical population
Census	Pop.	Note	%±
1820	2,695		—
1850	3,103		—
1860	3,100		−0.1%
1870	3,303		6.5%
1880	3,715		12.5%
1890	3,420		−7.9%
1900	3,489		2.0%
1910	3,522		0.9%
1920	2,497		−29.1%
1930	2,767		10.8%
1940	3,030		9.5%
1950	3,132		3.4%
1960	3,309		5.7%
1970	3,573		8.0%
1980	3,896		9.0%
1990	4,090		5.0%
2000	3,977		−2.8%
2010	3,741		−5.9%
2020	4,194		12.1%
U.S. Decennial Census

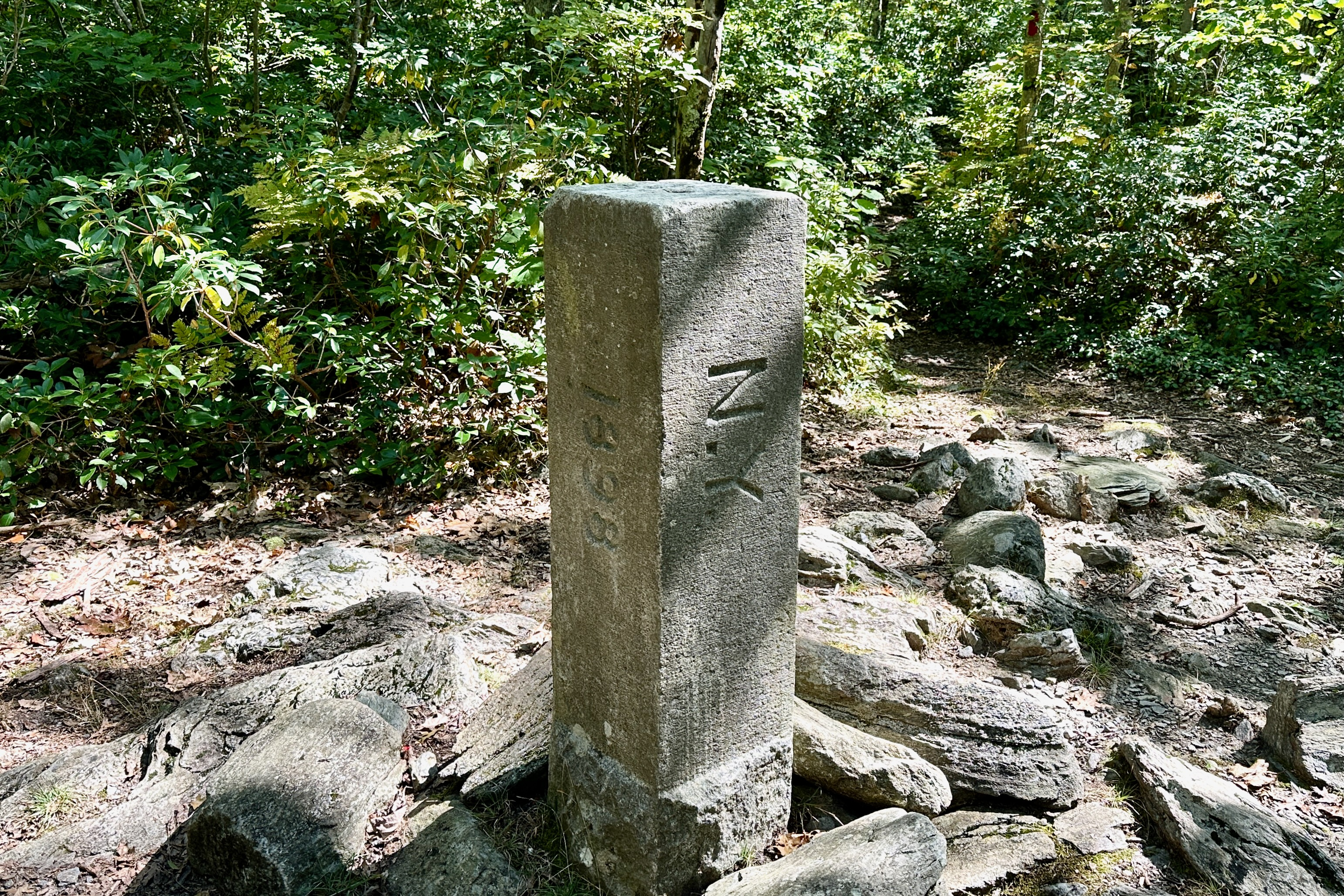
The CT-MA-NY tri-state marker on the border of Salisbury

As of the census of 2000, there were 3,977 people, 1,737 households, and 1,042 families residing in the town. The population density was 69.4 inhabitants per square mile (26.8/km^{2}). There were 2,410 housing units at an average density of 42.0 per square mile (16.2/km^{2}). The racial makeup of the town was 95.75% White, 1.66% African American, 0.33% Native American, 0.96% Asian, 0.45% from other races, and 0.85% from two or more races. Hispanic or Latino of any race were 1.53% of the population.

There were 1,737 households, out of which 25.5% had children under the age of 18 living with them, 50.4% were married couples living together, 7.2% had a female householder with no husband present, and 40.0% were non-families. 33.7% of all households were made up of individuals, and 15.3% had someone living alone who was 65 years of age or older. The average household size was 2.19 and the average family size was 2.81.

In the town, the population was spread out, with 22.4% under the age of 18, 3.7% from 18 to 24, 20.4% from 25 to 44, 31.9% from 45 to 64, and 21.6% who were 65 years of age or older. The median age was 47 years. For every 100 females, there were 89.2 males. For every 100 females age 18 and over, there were 83.4 males.

The median income for a household in the town was $53,051, and the median income for a family was $69,152. Males had a median income of $43,807 versus $29,861 for females. The per capita income for the town was $38,752. About 4.9% of families and 7.8% of the population were below the poverty line, including 7.6% of those under age 18 and 2.6% of those age 65 or over.

== Parks and recreation ==
The Appalachian Trail runs through Salisbury.

Mount Riga State Park is located in Salisbury.

=== Sports ===
The Salisbury Winter Sports Association hosts ski jumping competitions at its Satre Hill venue in Salisbury. It has hosted United States Eastern Ski Jumping Championships each February since 1952.

The well-known automobile racing course of Lime Rock Park is in the southeast corner of Salisbury.

== Government ==
Salisbury has an open town meeting form of government, with three selectmen.

== Education ==
Salisbury is a member of Regional School District 01, which also serves the towns of Canaan, Cornwall, Kent, North Canaan, and Sharon. Public school students attend Salisbury Central School (grades K–8), and Housatonic Valley Regional High School, which is in Falls Village. There are also three boarding schools in the town, Salisbury School and Hotchkiss School, both high schools, and Indian Mountain School, Pre-K through grade 9.

== Media ==
The community is served by a weekly newspaper, The Lakeville Journal, and the Republican-American, a daily newspaper based in Waterbury. The Salisbury Sampler is a 10-issue-per-year newsletter of community events, notices and news edited by the office of the Selectmen and mailed to all households. The Salisbury Association publishes a bi-annual newsletter covering the land trust, historical and civic committees news and activities. It is mailed to all households.

== Infrastructure ==
=== Transportation ===
U.S. Route 44 is the main east–west highway in the town, while Connecticut Route 41 is the main north–south highway. US 44 leads northeast 7 miles (11 km) to North Canaan and southwest 6 miles (10 km) to Millerton, New York. Route 41 leads south 8 miles (13 km) to Sharon and north 17 miles (27 km) to Great Barrington, Massachusetts. Connecticut Route 112 runs diagonally, northwest to southeast, and connects with U.S. Route 7, which runs north–south parallel to the Housatonic River.

== Notable people ==
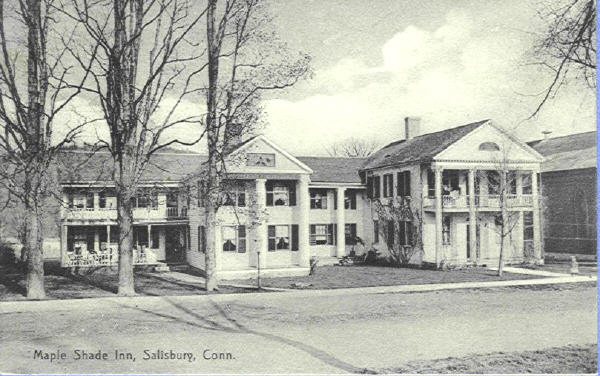
Maple Shade Inn (1908 postcard)

- Ethan Allen (1738–1789), owned a blast furnace in Lakeville in the 1760s
- Charles B. Andrews (1834–1902), Governor of Connecticut (1878–1881)
- William Henry Barnum (1818–1889), congressman and US senator, longest-serving chairman of the U.S. Democratic Committee, president of Barnum & Richardson Company, lived in Lime Rock
- Bill Binzen (1918–2010), photographer
- Daniel Chipman (1765–1850), congressman from Vermont
- Nathaniel Chipman (1752–1843), US senator from Vermont and Chief Justice of the Vermont Supreme Court
- Martin Chittenden (1763–1840), seventh governor of Vermont (1813–1815); born in Salisbury
- Thomas Chittenden (1730–1797), first governor of Vermont
- Samuel Church (1785-1854), politician, lawyer, Chief Justice of the Connecticut Supreme Court 1845-1854
- Jill Clayburgh (1944–2010), Academy Award-nominated actress; lived and died in Lakeville
- Maurice Firuski (1894–1978), bookseller, alumnus of Yale University
- Jeff Greenfield (born 1943), ABC television journalist and commentator
- Margaret Hamilton (1902–1985), actress who played the Wicked Witch of the West in The Wizard of Oz; spent her last years in town
- Edward Herrmann (1943–2014), Emmy Award-winning actor
- Horace Holley (1781–1827), minister of Hollis Street Church and president of Transylvania College
- John M. Holley (1802–1848), US congressman
- Myron Holley (1779–1841), Erie Canal builder
- Maria Bissell Hotchkiss (1827–1901), widow of Benjamin B. Hotchkiss, founded Hotchkiss School in Lakeville
- Josiah S. Johnston (1784–1833), US senator representing Louisiana
- Alfred Korzybski (1879–1950), founded the Institute of General Semantics at a country estate in Lime Rock and directed it until his death; institute remained there until 1981
- Richmond Landon (1898–1971), Olympic gold medal winner
- Wanda Landowska (1879–1959), harpsichordist; resident of Lakeville from 1949 until death in 1959
- Laura Linney (born 1964), Emmy and Golden Globe award-winning actress
- Frederick Miles (1815–1896), congressman from Connecticut
- Peter Buell Porter (1773–1844), U.S. Secretary of War (1828–1829); born in town
- Joseph Schumpeter (1883–1950), economist; died in Taconic in 1950
- Jonathan Scoville (1830–1891), congressman
- Roy Sherwood (1932–2017), ski jumper in 1956 Olympics
- Georges Simenon (1903–1989), prolific Belgian author, most notably of Maigret novels; lived in house called "Shadow Rock Farm" in Lakeville
- Meryl Streep (born 1949), multiple Oscar-winning actress; lives in Salisbury with her family
- David Spinozza (born 1949), guitarist, arranger, and record producer, who worked with Paul McCartney, John Lennon, James Taylor, Paul Simon, Ringo Starr and many others
- Rip Torn (1931–2019), Emmy Award-winning and Oscar-nominated actor
- Elisha Whittlesey (1783–1863), congressman
- John Owen (centenarian) (1735-1843), one of the earliest-born people to have ever been photographed

== See also ==
- Housatonic Valley Regional High School
- Salisbury School
