= List of Hotchkiss School alumni =

Hotchkiss School is a private, day and boarding school in Lakeville, Connecticut. Following are some of its notable alumni. Former pupils are known as Pythians (even entrance year) or Olympians (odd entrance year).

== Academia ==
Name	Class	Notability	References
Willard F. Enteman II	1955	Bowdoin College president	
Arthur Lehman Goodhart	1908	Oxford's University College master and legal scholar	
Alfred Whitney Griswold	1924	Yale University president	
Benjamin Woods Labaree	1945	Williams College dean	
Leonard Woods Labaree	1915	Yale history professor	
Roger Sherman Loomis	1905	Columbia English professor	
Scotty McLennan	1966	Stanford dean for religious life, inspiration for Doonesbury character Reverend Scot Sloan	
Scott Meadow	1973	Kaplan McCormack Family Clinical Professor of Entrepreneurship at The University of Chicago Booth School of Business	
Jerome J. Pollitt	1953	Yale art history professor	
Walter W. Taylor	1931	Conjunctive archaeology founder and professor	
Nader Tehrani	1981	Dean of the Irwin S. Chanin School of Architecture of the Cooper Union	
Christopher Winship	1968	Harvard sociology professor	

== Art and architecture ==
Name	Class	Notability	References
Peter Arno	1922	The New Yorker cartoonist	
Thomas Hoving	1949	Director of the Metropolitan Museum of Art	
Gerald Clery Murphy	1907	Artist, socialite, CEO of Mark Cross	
Samuel Wagstaff	1940	Art curator and museum director	
Evans Woollen III	1945	Architect, principal and founder of Woollen, Molzan and Partners, Indianapolis	

== Business ==
Name	Class	Notability	References
Jonathan Bush	1949	George H. W. Bush's brother and investment banker	
William H. T. Bush	1956	Investment banker	
Roy D. Chapin Jr.	1933	American Motors CEO	
Granger K. Costikyan	1925	Armenian-American banker	
Edsel Ford	1958	Ford Motor Company executive	
Henry Ford II	1936	Ford Motor Company executive	
William Clay Ford Sr.	1943	Ford Motor Company executive	
William Clay Ford Jr.	1975	Ford Motor Company executive	
Briton Hadden	1915	Time co-founder	
Robert Lehman	1908	Lehman Brothers executive	
David McCord Lippincott	1943	McCann Erickson creative director and copywriter	
Henry Luce	1916	Time co-founder	
Mark Mays	1981	Clear Channel Communications executive	
Raymond McGuire	1975	Former head of Investment Banking at Citigroup	
Forrest Mars Jr.	1949	Mars, Inc. executive	
John Mars	1953	Mars, Inc. executive	
Philip W. Pillsbury	1920	Pillsbury Company executive	
John Shedd Reed	1935	Santa Fe Railway executive	
Harold Stanley	1904	Morgan Stanley founder	
John L. Thornton	1972	Goldman Sachs executive	
William von Mueffling	1986	Cantillon Capital Management founder	

== Entertainment ==
Name	Class	Notability	References
John G. Avildsen	1955	Film director of Rocky and The Karate Kid	
Max Carlish		Documentary filmmaker; recipient of a BAFTA and an International Emmy Award	
Elizabeth Chandler	1982	Screenwriter of The Sisterhood of the Traveling Pants and What A Girl Wants	
John Crosby	1944	Founder and director of the Santa Fe Opera; recipient of National Medal of Arts	
Bradford Dillman	1947	Film actor	
Peter Duchin	1954	Leader and organizer Peter Duchin Orchestras and Duchin Entertainment	
Frederick "Dennis" Greene	1968	Founder and lead singer of Sha Na Na and professor at the University of Dayton School of Law	
John H. Hammond	1929	Executive and producer at Columbia Records; discovered Bob Dylan, Bruce Springsteen	
Leland Hayward	1920	Hollywood and Broadway agent and producer	
John Hoyt		Film and television actor	
Peter H. Hunt	1957	Theater and television director, recipient of a Tony Award for the musical 1776	
Allison Janney	1977	Oscar and Emmy Award-winning actress	
Richard Jordan		Film and stage actor	
Thunder Keck	2017	WWE wrestler	
Esko Laine	1980	Double bass player with the Berlin Philharmonic Orchestra	
Chris Meledandri	1977	Founder and CEO of Illumination Entertainment and 20th Century Fox Animation	
Douglas Moore	1911	Pulitzer Prize-winning composer	
Ben Mulroney	1993	Host of Canadian Idol	
Scott Powell	1966	Member of the rock group Sha Na Na; orthopedic surgeon	
Lily Rabe		Film and television actress	
Roswell Rudd	1954	Grammy-nominated jazz trombonist	
Burr Steers		Filmmaker and actor	
Chris Wallace	1963	Broadcast journalist	
Tom Werner	1967	Co-founder of Carsey-Werner Company, whose productions include That '70s Show, 3rd Rock from the Sun, The Cosby Show; chairman of Liverpool F.C. and the Boston Red Sox	

== Government and diplomacy ==
Name	Class	Notability	References
Victor Ashe	1963	United States Ambassador to Poland	
Malcolm Baldrige Jr.	1940	United States Secretary of Commerce	
Donald B. Easum	1942	United States Ambassador to Nigeria and United States Assistant Secretary of State	
G. McMurtrie Godley	1935	United States Ambassador to Laos and co-founder of the Glimmerglass Opera	
Hallett Johnson	1904	United States Ambassador to Costa Rica	
John Langeloth Loeb Jr.		United States Ambassador to Denmark	
Winston Lord	1955	United States Ambassador to China	
Livingston T. Merchant	1922	United States Ambassador to Canada and Undersecretary of State for Political Affairs	
Clark T. Randt Jr.	1964	United States Ambassador to China	
Strobe Talbott	1964	Deputy Secretary of State, journalist, diplomat, president of Brookings Institution	
Paul Warnke		Assistant Secretary of Defense for International Security Affairs	
Arthur K. Watson	1938	United States Ambassador to France	
Charles Yost	1956	United States Ambassador to the United Nations; Laos, Syria, and Morocco	

== Law ==
Name	Class	Notability	References
Samuel H. Blackmer		Associate Justice of the Vermont Supreme Court	
Robert Bork		United States Solicitor General, Conservative legal scholar, judge	
Lisa Brown	1978	General Counsel of the United States Department of Education, staff secretary to President Barack Obama	
Eli Whitney Debevoise	1917	Attorney and founder of Debevoise & Plimpton	
Peter Hall	1966	Judge of the US Court of Appeals for the Second Circuit and former U.S. Attorney for the District of Vermont	
Jon Ormond Newman	1949	Judge of the United States court of appeals	
Potter Stewart	1933	Justice of the US Supreme Court	

== Literature and journalism ==
Name	Class	Notability	References
C. D. B. Bryan		Journalist	
José Camprubí	1897	La Prensa owner	
Edwin Denby	1919	Poet and dance critic	
Tom Dolby	1994	Author	
Varian Fry	1926	Journalist and "the American Schindler"	
John Hersey	1932	Pulitzer Prize for Fiction 1945 winner and Yale's Pierson College master	
Lewis H. Lapham	1952	Editor of Harper's Magazine and Lapham's Quarterly	
William Loeb	1923	Publisher of the Manchester Union Leader newspaper	
Peter Matthiessen	1945	National Book Award winner 1979, 1980, and 2008	
Archibald MacLeish	1911	Winner of 1933 and 1953 Pulitzer Prize for Poetry and 1959 Pulitzer Prize for Drama	
Julia Quinn	1987	Romantic novelist	
Tom Reiss	1982	Winner of the 2013 Pulitzer Prize for Biography	
MacKenzie Scott	1988	Novelist	

== Medicine and science ==
Name	Class	Notability	References
Alexandra Golby	1985	Neurosurgeon and professor of neurosurgery and radiology at Harvard Medical School	
David Hawkins	1931	Science philosopher and Manhattan Project's official historian	
Charles Snead Houston	1931	Physician and early high altitude pulmonary edema researcher	
John Christopher Muran	1980	Clinical psychologist, psychotherapy researcher, and academic dean	
Dickinson W. Richards Jr.	1913	Nobel Prize laureate	

== Military ==
Name	Class	Notability	References
Thaddeus Beal	1935	Under Secretary of the Army	
Douglas Campbell	1913	First aviator in an American unit to achieve the status of flying ace	
Artemus Gates	1911	World War I hero and Under Secretary of the Navy	
Roswell Gilpatric	1924	Assistant Secretary of the Air Force and Deputy Secretary of Defense	
Frank O'Driscoll Hunter	1913	Chief of the First Air Force in World War II	
Paul Nitze	1924	Secretary of the Navy	
Elliott B. Strauss	1921	Rear Admiral and key Allied staff officer for the Invasion of Normandy	

== Ministry ==
Name	Class	Notability	References
Margot Käßmann	1975	Bishop of Evangelical-Lutheran Church of Hanover Landesbischöfin, first chairwoman of Evangelical Church in Germany	
Henry Knox Sherrill	1907	Bishop of Massachusetts and Presiding Bishop of Episcopal Church	

== Politics ==
Name	Class	Notability	References
R. Lawrence Coughlin	1946	United States House of Representatives	
Charles Edison	1909	Governor of New Jersey	
Frederick Vanderbilt Field	1923	Political activist, staff member of Institute of Pacific Relations	
Philip Goodhart	1944	British politician	
Porter J. Goss	1956	United States House of Representatives and Director of the CIA	
Ernest Gruening	1903	Governor of Alaska and United States Senate	
William Kirk Kaynor		United States House of Representatives	
Lawrence M. Judd	1906	Governor of Hawaii	
Robert D. Orr	1936	Governor of Indiana and United States Ambassador to Singapore	
William Warren Scranton	1935	Governor of Pennsylvania and United States Ambassador to the United Nations	
Jerry Voorhis	1919	United States House of Representatives	

== Sports ==
Name	Class	Notability	References
Edwin F. Blair	1920	All-American lineman for the undefeated Yale's 1923 football team	
Caitlin Cahow	2003	Olympic bronze and silver medalist in hockey	
Luke Glendening		NHL forward	
Stephen Greenberg	1966	2nd Deputy Commissioner of Baseball	
Matt Herr		NHL forward	
Fred Kammer	1930	Olympic bronze medalist in hockey	
Hank Ketcham	1910	All-American lineman for Yale (1911–1913), inductee to the College Football Hall of Fame	
Gina Kingsbury	2000	Olympic gold medalist in hockey for Canada	
Richmond Landon		Gold medal-winning high jumper at the 1920 Summer Olympics	
Torrey Mitchell	2004	NHL forward	
Marshall Rifai	2017	NHL defenceman with the Toronto Maple Leafs	
Raymond W. "Ducky" Pond	1921	Yale University football player and coach	
Peter Revson		Formula One race car driver.	
Shavar Thomas		Major League Soccer player for the Jamaica National Football Team	
Fay Vincent	1958	8th MLB Baseball Commissioner	
