= Golsby =

Golsby is a surname. Notable people with the surname include:

- Brian Golsby (born 1988), American murderer
- Kevin Golsby (born 1935), Australian actor and voiceover artist

== See also ==
- Derek Goldby (1940–2022), Australian theatre director
- Golby, surname
- Goldsby (surname)
