= Jerome J. Pollitt =

American art historian (1934–2024)

- Born: Jerome Jordan Pollitt; November 26, 1934; Fair Lawn, New Jersey, U.S.
- Died: April 24, 2024 (aged 89)
- Occupations: Art historian; professor
- Awards: Wilbur Cross Medal (1991)

Academic background
- Education: Yale University (BA); Columbia University (PhD)
- Thesis: The Critical Terminology of the Visual Arts in Ancient Greece (1963)
- Influences: Vincent Scully

Academic work
- Discipline: Art history
- Sub-discipline: Ancient Greek art
- Institutions: Yale University
- Notable students: Romita Ray

Jerome Jordan Pollitt (November 26, 1934 – April 24, 2024) was an American art historian and professor. At the time of his death, he served as Sterling Professor, Emeritus at Yale University.

== Early life and education ==
Pollitt was born to Doris Jordan and John K. Pollitt in Fair Lawn, New Jersey on November 26, 1934. Pollitt graduated from the Hotchkiss School in 1953. He then earned a Bachelor of Arts degree from Yale University in 1957 and a Doctor of Philosophy from Columbia University in 1963. After his graduation from Yale, Pollitt became a Fulbright Scholar at the American School of Classical Studies at Athens. After returning to the United States, he was drafted and served a term in the United States Army before continuing his education at Columbia.

== Career ==
While earning his doctorate at Columbia, Pollitt became an instructor at his alma mater, Yale, in 1962, becoming a full professor in 1973. Following that appointment, he also served as the editor-in-chief of the American Journal of Archaeology from 1973 to 1977. Pollitt is one of few Yale professors that have served as chair of two departments: art history and classics, in this case. As a result of his academic achievements, Pollitt was selected to succeed Keith Stewart Thomson as Dean of the Yale Graduate School of Arts and Sciences in 1986. He was replaced by Judith Rodin in 1991. In that year, Pollitt won the Wilbur Cross Medal. He was subsequently appointed John M. Schiff Professor of Classical Archaeology and History of Art in 1990, and named as the Sterling Professor of Classical Archeology and the History of Art in 1995. He retired in 1999, was given the title Emeritus. Pollitt died on April 24, 2024 after battling a long illness.

== See also ==
- List of Hotchkiss School alumni
- List of Yale University people
