= Timothy Dwight V =

American academic, President of Yale University (1886–1898)

The Reverend Timothy Dwight V
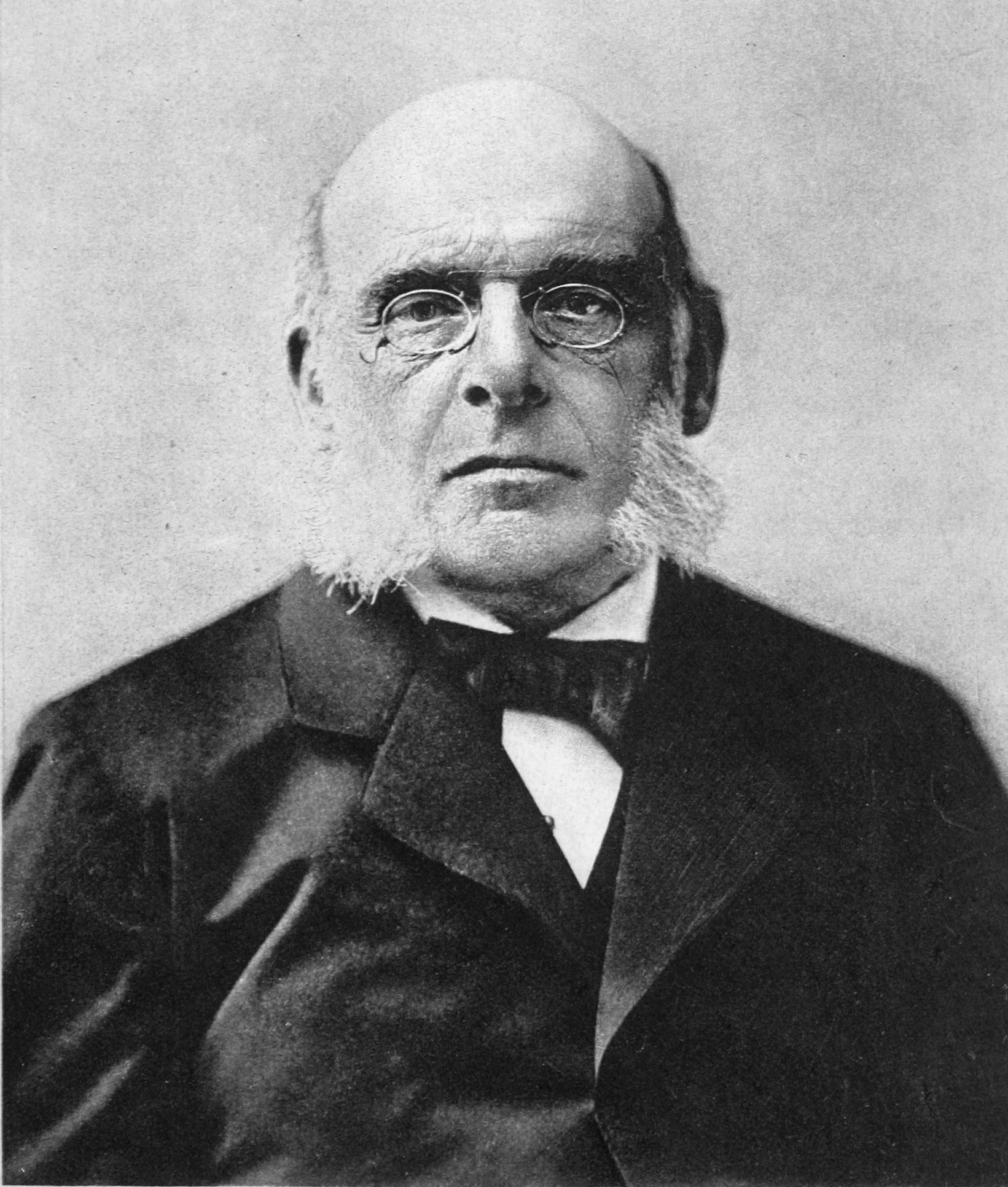

12th President of Yale University
- In office 1886–1899
- Preceded by: Noah Porter
- Succeeded by: Arthur Twining Hadley

Personal details
- Born: November 16, 1828 Norwich, Connecticut, U.S.
- Died: May 26, 1916 (aged 87) New Haven, Connecticut, U.S.
- Resting place: Grove Street Cemetery; New Haven, Connecticut, U.S.
- Spouse: Jane Wakeman (m. 1866)
- Children: 2
- Relatives: Timothy Dwight IV (grandfather)
- Education: Yale College; University of Bonn; University of Berlin

Timothy Dwight V (November 16, 1828 – May 26, 1916) was an American academic, educator, Congregational minister, and President of Yale University (1886–1898). During his years as the school's president, Yale's schools first organized as a university. His grandfather was Timothy Dwight IV, who served as President of Yale College ninety years before his grandson's tenure.

== Biography ==
Dwight was born in Norwich, Connecticut, the son of James Dwight. His paternal grandfather, Timothy Dwight IV, served as president of Yale College from 1795 to 1817. He was the great-grandson of Major Timothy Dwight and Mary (Edwards) Dwight, the latter's father being the Rev. Jonathan Edwards, the third president of Princeton University. His mother was Susan, daughter of John McLaren Breed, by his second wife Rebecca (Walker) Breed, who was the daughter of Robert Walker, a judge of the Superior Court of Connecticut.

Timothy Dwight entered Yale in 1845, and during his undergraduate course received prizes in mathematics and Latin, and was a member of the Linonian Society, Phi Beta Kappa, and Skull and Bones. As the Clark Scholar, he spent the period from 1849 to 1851 in graduate work at Yale, in the fall of the latter year entering the Theological Department, where he studied for two years. He served as a tutor in the College from 1851 to 1855, and then went abroad to continue his studies at the universities of Bonn and Berlin.

== Career ==
Returning to America in July 1858, he became professor of sacred literature at Yale at the opening of the next college year. His work in the Divinity School continued until 1886, when he was elected president of Yale College. Yale had begun to develop the departments of professional study—particularly of theology and medicine—at the beginning of the nineteenth century, during the administration of the elder President Dwight; and the institution, long a University in fact, became one in name at the inauguration of the younger Dwight. During the thirteen years of his presidency, from 1886 to 1899, the University began that rapid development in scope, in numbers of students and faculty, in material prosperity, and in national influence.

Dwight was licensed to preach May 22, 1855, and ordained to the ministry of the Congregational Church six years later. In 1869, Chicago Theological Seminary conferred the honorary degree of Doctor of Divinity upon him, and Yale honored him with a similar degree in 1886. He also received the degree of LLD from Harvard in 1886 and from Princeton in 1888. He was an associate member of the American Academy of Arts and Sciences and elected an honorary member of the Connecticut Society of the Cincinnati in 1895.

Dwight was a member of the American committee for the revision of the English version of the Bible, and for a number of years he was one of the editors of the New Englander. He had contributed extensively to various publications on theological and educational subjects. In 1886, he translated and edited, with additional notes, Frédéric Louis Godet's Commentary on the Gospel of John, and he had also edited several of Meyer's commentaries, including those on Romans, on several other Pauline Epistles, on Hebrews, and on the Epistles of James, Peter, John, and Jude.

He was the author of "Thoughts of and for the Inner Life" (1899), and in 1903 published "Memories of Yale Life and Men" Address Delivered at the Funeral of President Porter (1892) and a Commemorative Address in honor of W. D. Whitney and J. D. Dana (1895).

On April 19, 1889, he was a delegate to the organizational meeting of the National Society of the Sons of the American Revolution at Fraunces Tavern in New York City. He was elected as the first chaplain of the National Society.

Dwight played an important role in the founding and early growth of the Hotchkiss School, a college preparatory boarding school located in Lakeville, Connecticut. After Maria Bissell Hotchkiss received a large inheritance from her husband, Benjamin B. Hotchkiss, Dwight approached her with the idea that she "finance a school that would prepare young men for college—for Yale, to be precise." Dwight was one of the incorporators and original trustees of Hotchkiss when the school was founded in 1891, and he continued to serve as a trustee for 25 years until his death in 1916, when the school's board noted in a resolution that the institution "in a large sense was the child of his creation... [and] that it was his wisdom that largely dominated its inception, creation, and upbuilding."

He served as Secretary of the Class of 1849 continuously from graduation until his death, which occurred, without warning, at his home in New Haven, May 26, 1916, as the result of infirmities incident to his advanced age. Burial was in Grove Street Cemetery in New Haven.

Dwight's full-length portrait by Edmund C. Tarbell hangs in the stairwell of Woodbridge Hall, the Yale administration building.

== Family ==
He was married in that city, December 31, 1866, to Jane Wakeman, daughter of Roger Sherman Skinner, who graduated from Yale in 1813, and Mary Lockwood (DeForest) Skinner. She survived him with their son, Winthrop Edwards (B.A. 1893, Ph.D. 1895, LL.B. 1896). Their daughter, Helen Rood, died October 16, 1909. John Breed Dwight, a graduate of Yale in 1840, and James McLaren Breed Dwight (B.A. 1846, LL.B. Columbia 1861) were his brothers. He was a cousin of Theodore Dwight Woolsey (B.A. 1820), who for 25 years was the president of Yale. In 1935, Yale constructed the ninth of its twelve residential colleges, Timothy Dwight College. It was named for Dwight and his grandfather, who were both regarded as particularly important presidents of Yale.

Jane Wakeman (Skinner) Dwight was the great-granddaughter of American founding father Roger Sherman.

== See also ==
- List of Skull and Bones members

Academic offices
Preceded by Noah Porter III	President of Yale College/Yale University; 1886–1899	Succeeded by Arthur Twining Hadley
