= Edwin Denby (poet) =

American dance critic and poet

- Born: Edwin Orr Denby; February 4, 1903; Tianjin, China
- Died: July 12, 1983 (aged 80); Searsmont, Maine, United States
- Education: Harvard University; University of Vienna
- Occupation: Writer
- Writing career
- Language: English

Edwin Orr Denby (February 4, 1903 – July 12, 1983) was an American writer of dance criticism, poetry, and fiction, but is perhaps now best known for his work with Orson Welles in translating and adapting the 1851 French comedy The Italian Straw Hat to the American stage in 1936 in the form of the farce Horse Eats Hat.

== Early life, education and early career ==
The son of Charles Denby, Jr. and Martha Dalzell Orr, Edwin was born in Tianjin, China, where Charles had been appointed as chief foreign advisor to Yuan Shikai a year earlier. Edwin's grandfather, Charles Harvey Denby, who had served as the United States Ambassador to China for an unprecedented 13 years, died when Edwin was age one. Edwin's namesake uncle served as Secretary of the Navy during 1921–1924.

Denby spent his childhood first in Shanghai, China, then in Vienna, Austria, where his father served as consul general from 1909 to 1915, before coming to the United States in 1916.

He was educated at the Hotchkiss School in Lakeville, Connecticut; and attended Harvard University, in Cambridge, Massachusetts, but failed to graduate. He also attended classes at the University of Vienna, before obtaining a diploma in gymnastics (with specialty in modern dance) at the Hellerau-Laxenburg school in Vienna in 1928.

He performed for several years, notably with the Darmstadt State Theater and celebrated triumphs alongside Claire Eckstein, a German ballerina and choreographer.

Looking for someone to take his passport photo, he encountered photographer and filmmaker Rudy Burckhardt in Switzerland in 1934, and the two remained inseparable for the rest of Denby's life. The following year, they returned to New York City, New York, and rented a loft for eighteen dollars a month in a five-story walk-up building on West 21st Street in Chelsea.

Denby's friendship with painter Willem de Kooning, who lived one floor below in the adjacent building, began shortly thereafter when de Kooning's kitten turned up on the fire-escape outside of Denby's window one evening.

== Writing ==
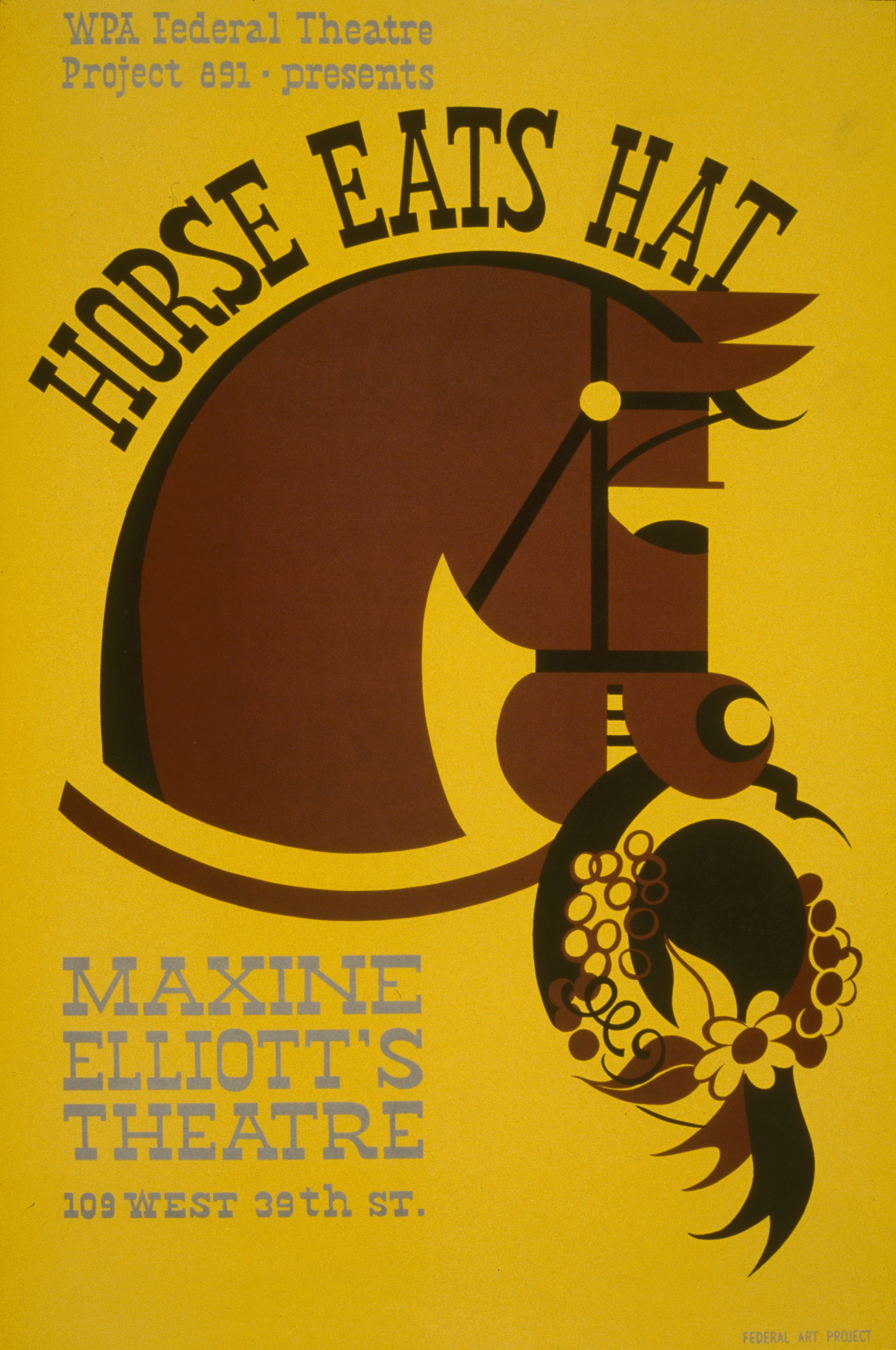
Poster for the Federal Theatre production of Horse Eats Hat at the Maxine Elliott Theatre (1936)

In 1935, soon after Denby's return to New York City, Orson Welles and John Houseman asked him to help translate and adapt The Italian Straw Hat, by Eugene Labiche and Marc-Michel, for the Broadway stage. The resulting play, titled Horse Eats Hat, was scored by Paul Bowles, and was performed as a Works Progress Administration Federal Theatre Production in 1936. Denby also appeared in the play, playing one half of The Horse.

During his lifetime, being ambivalent about the publication of his poetry, he was known primarily as a dance critic. At the behest of Aaron Copland and Virgil Thomson, he began writing a dance column for the magazine Modern Music in 1936. In 1943, Thomson drafted Denby as the dance critic for the New York Herald Tribune.

=== Works ===
His dance reviews and essays were collected in Looking at the Dance (1949, reprinted 1968), Dancers, Buildings, and People in the Streets (1965) and Dance Writings (1986).

His small book on Willem de Kooning was published by Hanuman Books in 1988.

Denby's works of poetry include In Public, In Private (1948), Mediterranean Cities (1956), Snoring in New York (1974), Collected Poems (1975) and The Complete Poems (1986).

His English translation of Lao Tze's Chinese classic text Tao Te Ching from a German edition was published as Edwin's Tao in 1993.

Denby's only novel, Mrs. W's Last Sandwich (also released as Scream in a Cave) was published in 1972.

== Guggenheim Fellow ==
In 1948, he was awarded a Guggenheim Fellowship grant in poetry and dance criticism.

== Death and legacy ==
On July 12, 1983, at the summer house he maintained with Burckhardt in Searsmont Maine, he committed suicide by taking an overdose of sleeping pills; he had been ill and increasingly concerned about the loss of his mental powers.

Denby was inducted into the National Museum of Dance's Mr. & Mrs. Cornelius Vanderbilt Whitney Hall of Fame in 2002.

== See also ==
- List of critics
- List of Guggenheim Fellowships awarded in 1948
- List of Harvard University people
- List of Hotchkiss School alumni
- List of people from Maine
- List of people from New York City
- List of poets from the United States
