= Maria Bissell Hotchkiss =

American educator, heiress, and philanthropist

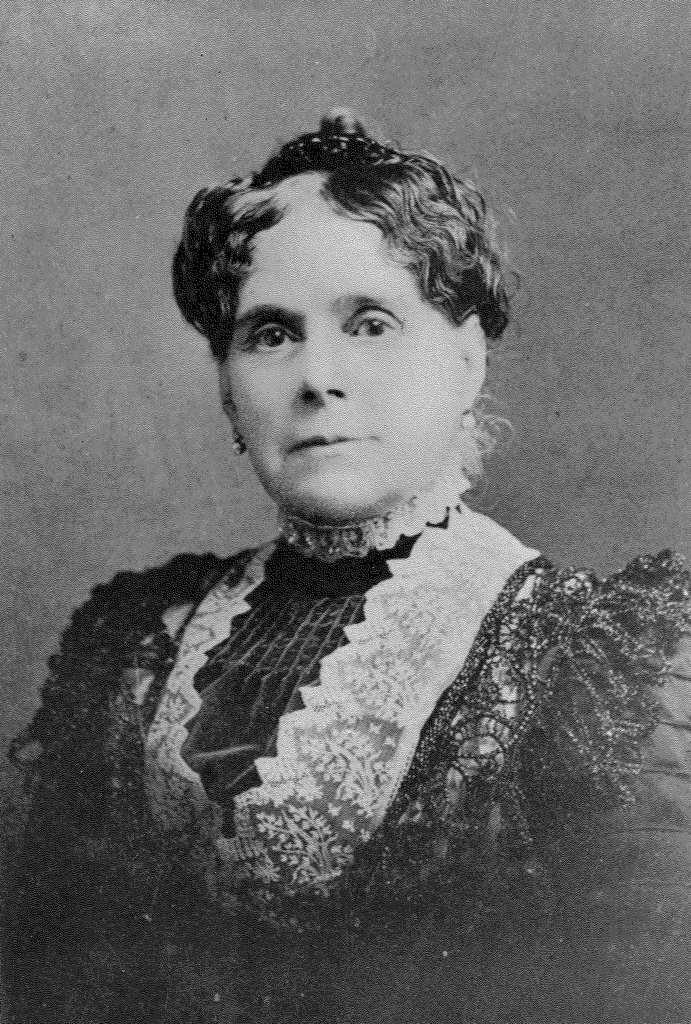
- Born: Maria Harrison Bissell; August 14, 1827; Salisbury, Connecticut
- Died: November 10, 1901 (aged 74); New York City
- Resting place: Town Hill Cemetery, Lakeville, Connecticut
- Education: Amenia Academy
- Occupation: Educator
- Spouse: Benjamin B. Hotchkiss
- Parent(s): William Bissell; Eliza Ann Loveland

Maria Harrison Hotchkiss (née Bissell; August 14, 1827 – November 10, 1901) was an American educator, heiress, and philanthropist. She was married to wealthy munitions maker Benjamin B. Hotchkiss, though long estranged. Upon receiving his inheritance she founded The Hotchkiss School, a private boarding school in Lakeville, Connecticut, in 1891.

== Early life ==
Maria Harrison Bissell was born on August 14, 1827, in Salisbury, Connecticut. Her father was William Bissell (1794–1869), and her mother was Eliza Ann Loveland (1800–1841). She grew up of slender means on a farm in Salisbury named "Tory Hill" with her two brothers, William Loveland Bissell (1833–1922) and Charles H. Bissell (1829–1928). The family was related to Presidents William Henry Harrison and Benjamin Harrison. Educated at Amenia Academy in Amenia, New York, she went on to work as a teacher there.

== Marriage ==
In 1850, she married Benjamin B. Hotchkiss, a Connecticut born gun maker. By the time of the American Civil War he had become a noted munitions developer. Hotchkiss patented a line of projectiles for rifled artillery that was used extensively during that conflict.

When the U.S. government showed little interest in funding new weapons after the war Hotchkiss moved to France in 1867 - without Maria. There he set up a munitions factory, Hotchkiss et Cie, which went on to develop the renowned revolving barrel artillery piece known as the Hotchkiss gun.

== Inheritance ==
Benjamin Hotchkiss died young, at age 58, in February 1885. Upon receiving her husband's inheritance, Maria considered macadamizing the streets of Salisbury and Sharon, Connecticut for use by automobiles. However, the idea was rejected by both towns, which thought the upkeep would be too expensive. Instead, she was convinced by Timothy Dwight V, the President of Yale University, to start a preparatory school. In 1891 she donated the land, buildings, and the endowment to found the Hotchkiss School, a private boarding school in Lakeville. The school purchased "Tory Hill," the farm where Mrs. Hotchkiss was born and spent her childhood, in 2010.

In 1893, she founded the Hotchkiss Library in Sharon, Connecticut, helping to choose its architectural design.

== Personal life ==
Maria married Benjamin B. Hotchkiss on May 27, 1850. However, he permanently moved to France in 1867, subsequently marrying a Miss Cunningham from New York in a French civil ceremony without first divorcing.

Later, Maria resided at the Plaza Hotel in New York City. She died on November 10, 1901, in New York City. She was buried in Lakeville with her Bissell relatives in the Town Hill Cemetery, which lies within the campus of The Hotchkiss School.
