= Horse Eats Hat =

1936 farce play co-written and directed by Orson Welles

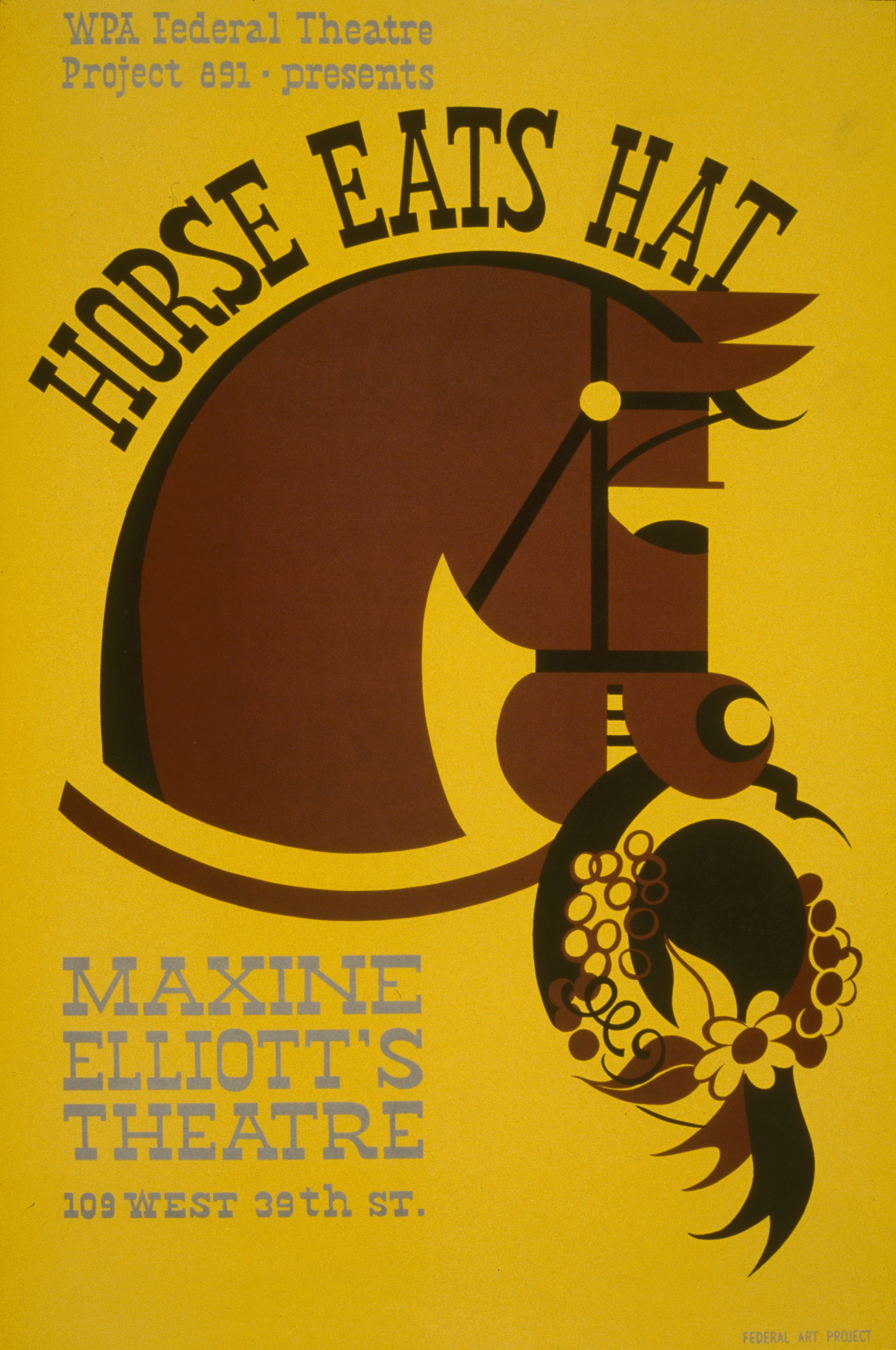
- Written by: Edwin Denby; Orson Welles; Based on the play The Italian Straw Hat by Eugène Labiche and Marc-Michel
- Original language: English
- Genre: Farce

Premiere
- Date premiered: September 26, 1936
- Place premiered: Maxine Elliott's Theatre, New York City

Horse Eats Hat is a 1936 farce play co-written and directed by Orson Welles (at the time 21 years of age) and presented under the auspices of the Federal Theatre Project. It was Welles's second WPA production, after his highly successful Voodoo Macbeth. The script, by Edwin Denby and Welles, was an adaptation of the classic French farce The Italian Straw Hat (French: Un chapeau de paille d'Italie) by Eugène Marin Labiche and Marc-Michel.

Starring Joseph Cotten, a mainstay of what would become known as the Mercury Theatre, the play premiered at Maxine Elliott's Theatre, New York City, on September 26, 1936, running until December 5, 1936.

== Assessment ==
Welles spoke to filmmaker Peter Bogdanovich about the production:

The farce Horse Eats Hat was the best of the Mercury shows – and, though successful, it divided the town. The press was mixed, yet it was always packed, and had an enormous following. Some people went to it every week as long as it ran.

Welles biographer Simon Callow addressed this production at the British Film Institute's premiere of the restored Welles film Chimes at Midnight in 2015:

(After the success of Voodoo Macbeth) ... they (John Houseman and Welles) decided to scheme a project of their own, and they did indeed set up a theatre company of their own under the umbrella of the Federal Theatre Project. They immediately embarked on a fantastically eclectic and crazy program. They gathered around them actors that they had loved ... people that we all know now very well from Citizen Kane; all kinds of character actors, and Welles had a special passion for variety artists – that's the background he had with his father, and so on. So, he crammed them all into their first show, which was a really crazily ambitious thing to do, which was the famous play of The Italian Straw Hat. Houseman particularly, and his friend Virgil Thomson who helped to do the translation, were ever aware of all the new currents in theatre. This time, instead of going towards Expressionism they went towards French Surrealism, and they devised a production, which one would so love to have seen, in which basically the production kept exploding. The set kept on falling down; it was 'the play that went wrong'. The proscenium arch suddenly cracked, and the audience thought that the proscenium arch had actually cracked, but it was all carefully planned. There were cars coming on the stage and going off the stage. It was a mad and insane kind of a romp. Very light-hearted and very fluffy. No political element to it at all. Detested by fifty percent of the press – adored by fifty percent of the press. Some people went again and again and again. Joshua Logan told Welles that it was the greatest piece of theatre that he had ever seen in his life. They had already created a sensation.

== Cast ==
Freddy	Joseph Cotten
Mugglethorpe	Orson Welles, Edgerton Paul
Horse	Carol King and Edwin Denby
Entwhistle	George Duthie
Uncle Adolphe	Donald MacMillian
Queeper	Dana Stevens
Bobbin	Hiram Sherman
Grimshot, Lieutenant of Cavalry	Sidney Smith
Joseph	Harry McKee
Gustave	France Bendtsen
Augustus	Bil Baird
Myrtle Mugglethorpe	Virginia Welles
Agatha Entwhistle	Paula Laurence
Tillie	Arlene Francis
The Countess	Sarah Burton
Daisy	Henriette Kaye
Clotilda	Lucy Rodriguez
Corporal	Bernard Savage
Butler	Walter Burton
First Footman	Steven Carter
Second Footman	J. Headley
Raguso	Enrico Cellini
Berkowitz	George Barter
Wedding Guests	Ellen Worth, Arabella St. James, Marie Jones, Hattie Rappaport, Anna Gold, Myron Paulson, Wallace Acton, Pell Dentler, George Leach, Bil Baird
Tillie's Girls	Peggy Hartley, Terry Carlson, Lee Molnar, Gloria Sheldon, Teresa Alvarez, Opal Essant, June Thorne, Mildred Cold, Geraldine Law
Countess's Guests	Georgia Empry, Solomon Goldstein, May Angela, Lawrence Hawley, Margaret Maley, Jack Smith, Mary Kukavski, Elizabeth Malone, Ann Morton, Helena Rapport, Helen Korsun, Nina Salama, Julie Fassett, Jane Hale, Jane Johnson, Michael Callaghan, Don Harward, Walter LeRoy, Harry Merchant, Warren Goddard
Citizens Night Patrol	Arthur Wood, James Perry, Victor Wright, Robert Hopkins, Craig Gordon, Harry Singer, Frank Kelly, Bernard Lewis, Henry Russelle, Charles Uday, George Smithfield, Henry Laird, Edwin Hemmer, George Armstrong, Jerry Hitchcock, Tod Brown

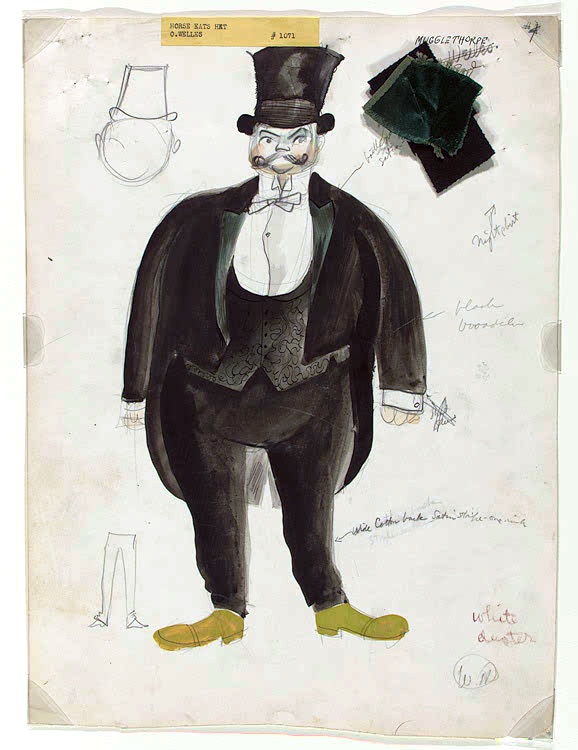
Costume for Mugglethorpe

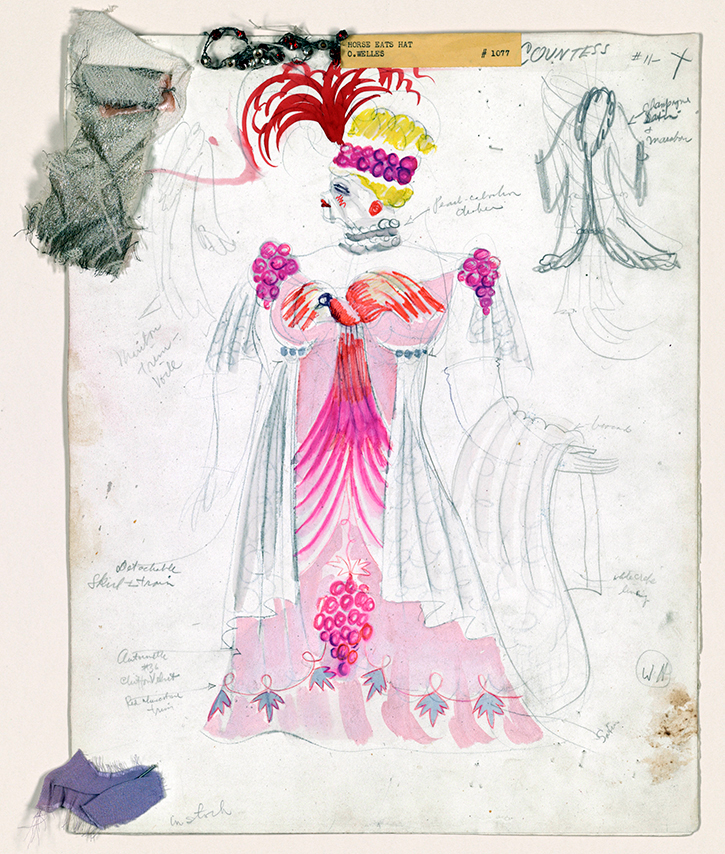
Costume for the Countess

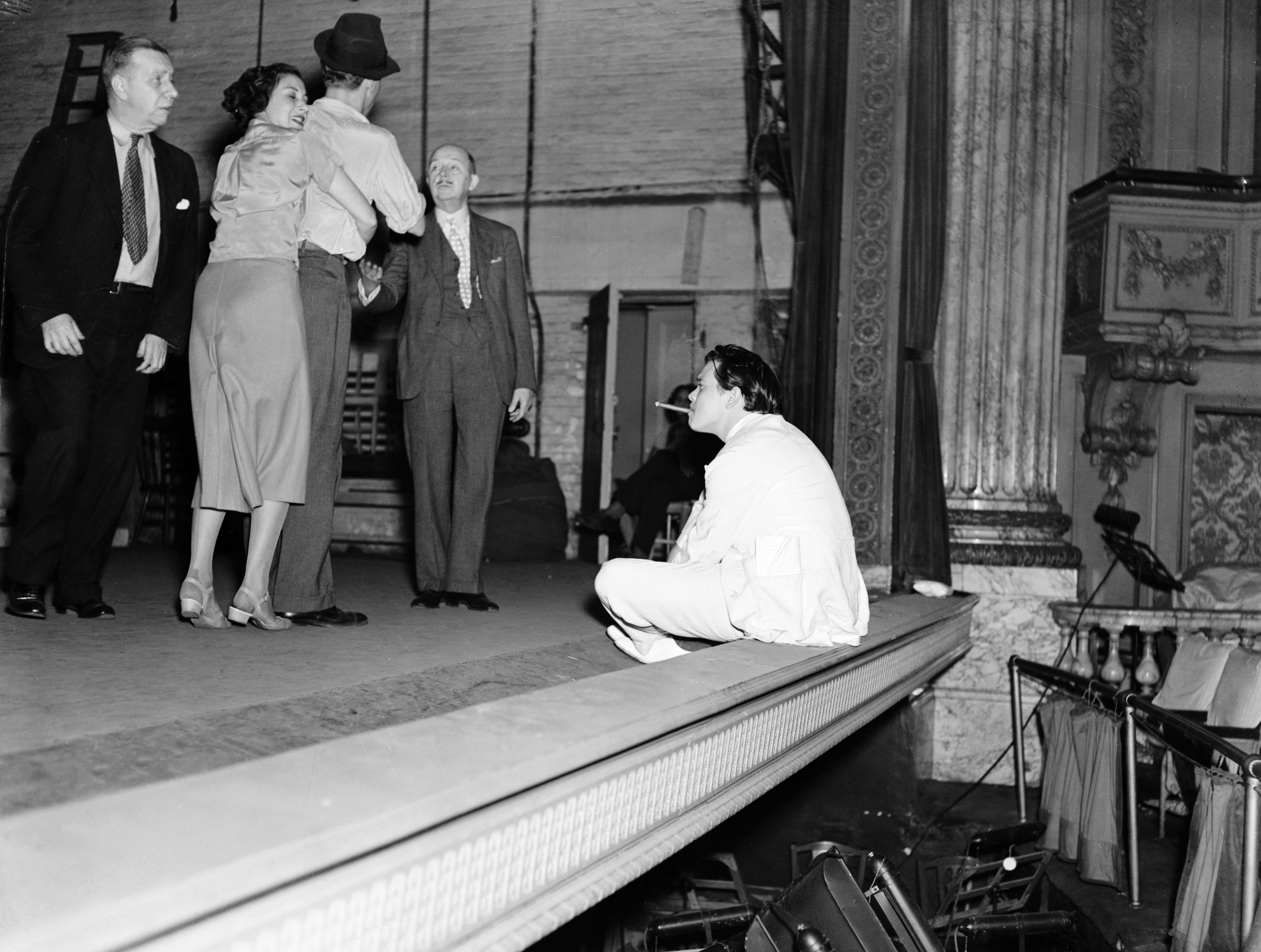
Arlene Francis, Joseph Cotten and Orson Welles at a rehearsal

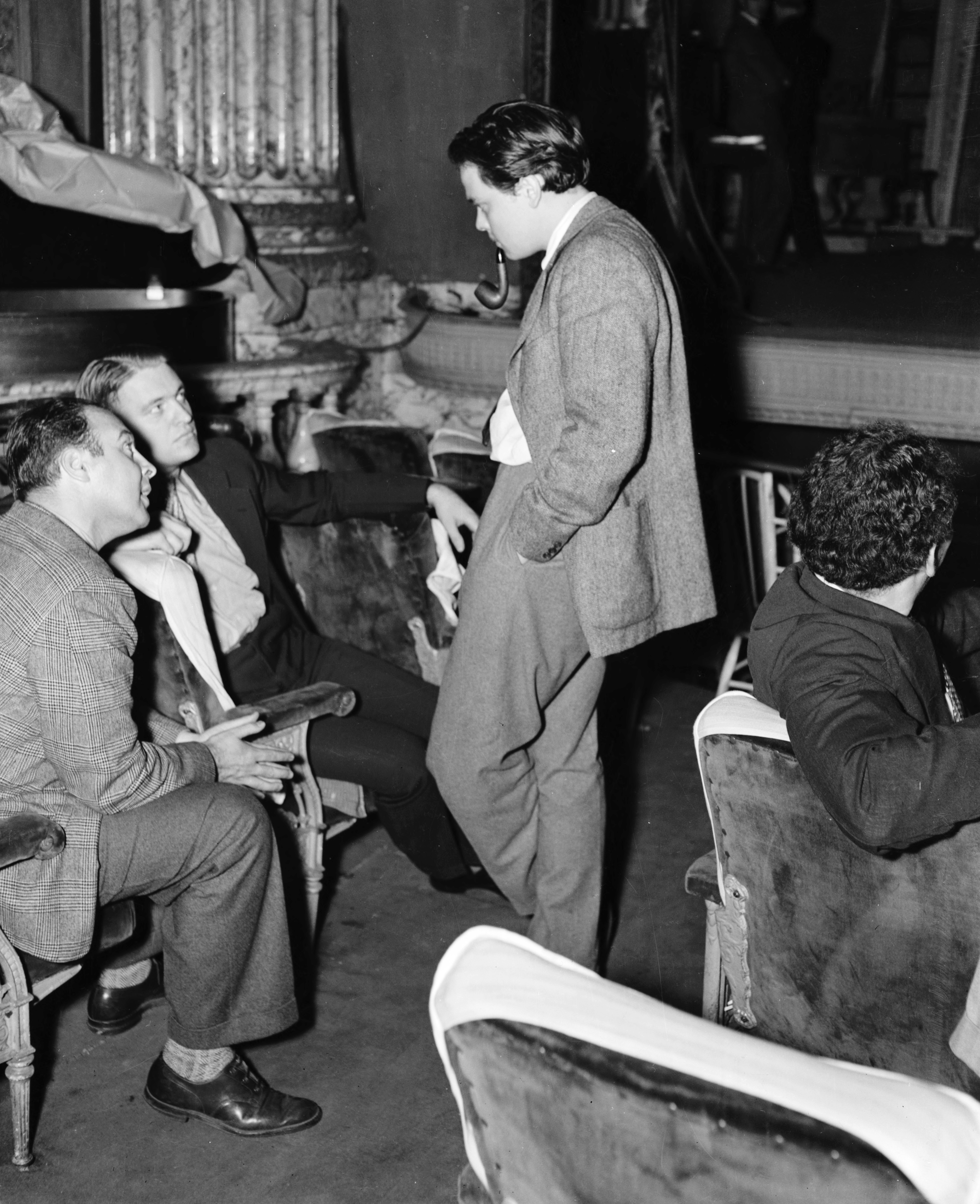
John Houseman, Edwin Denby and Welles at a rehearsal

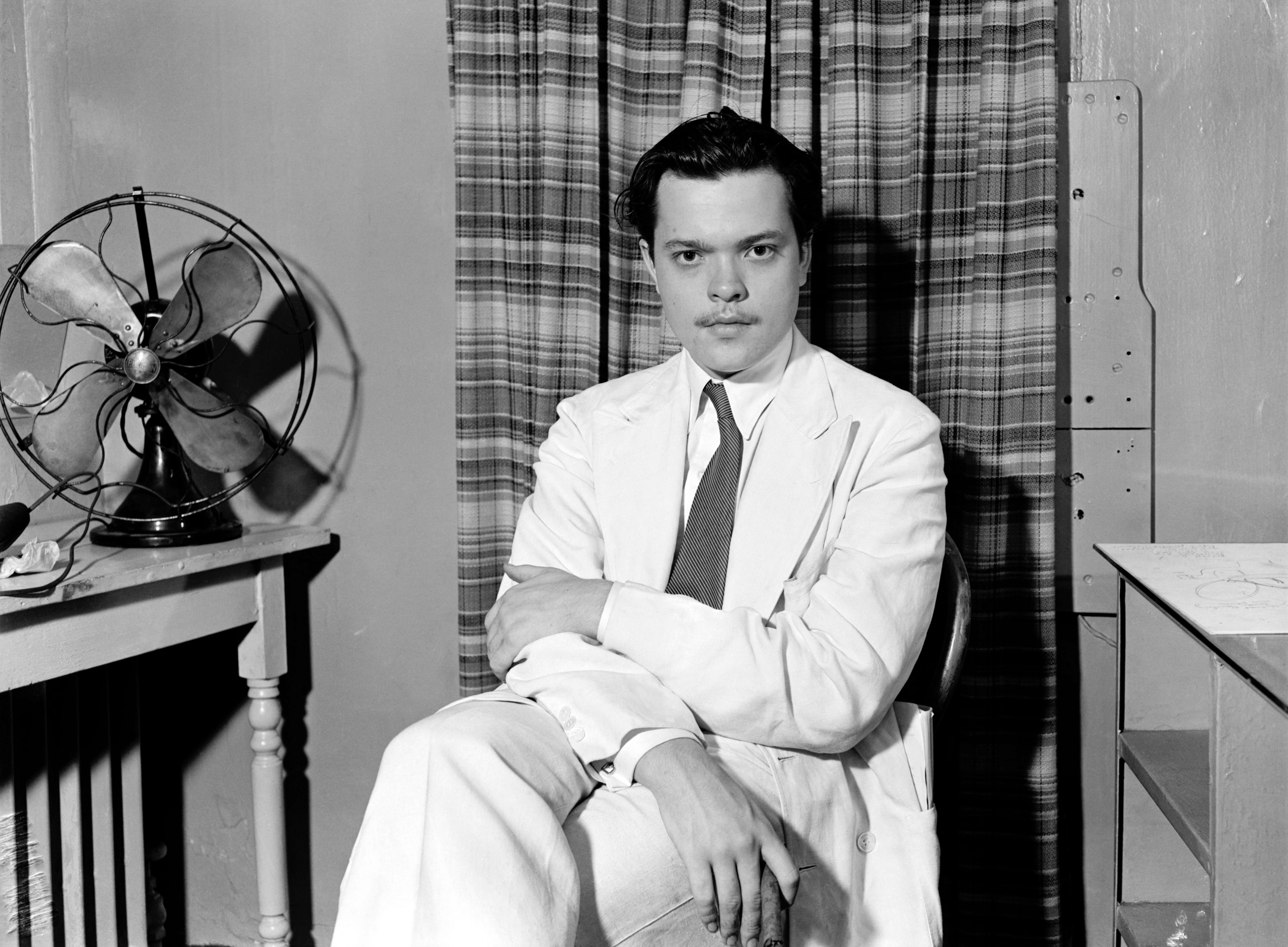
Welles in his office at Maxine Elliott's Theatre

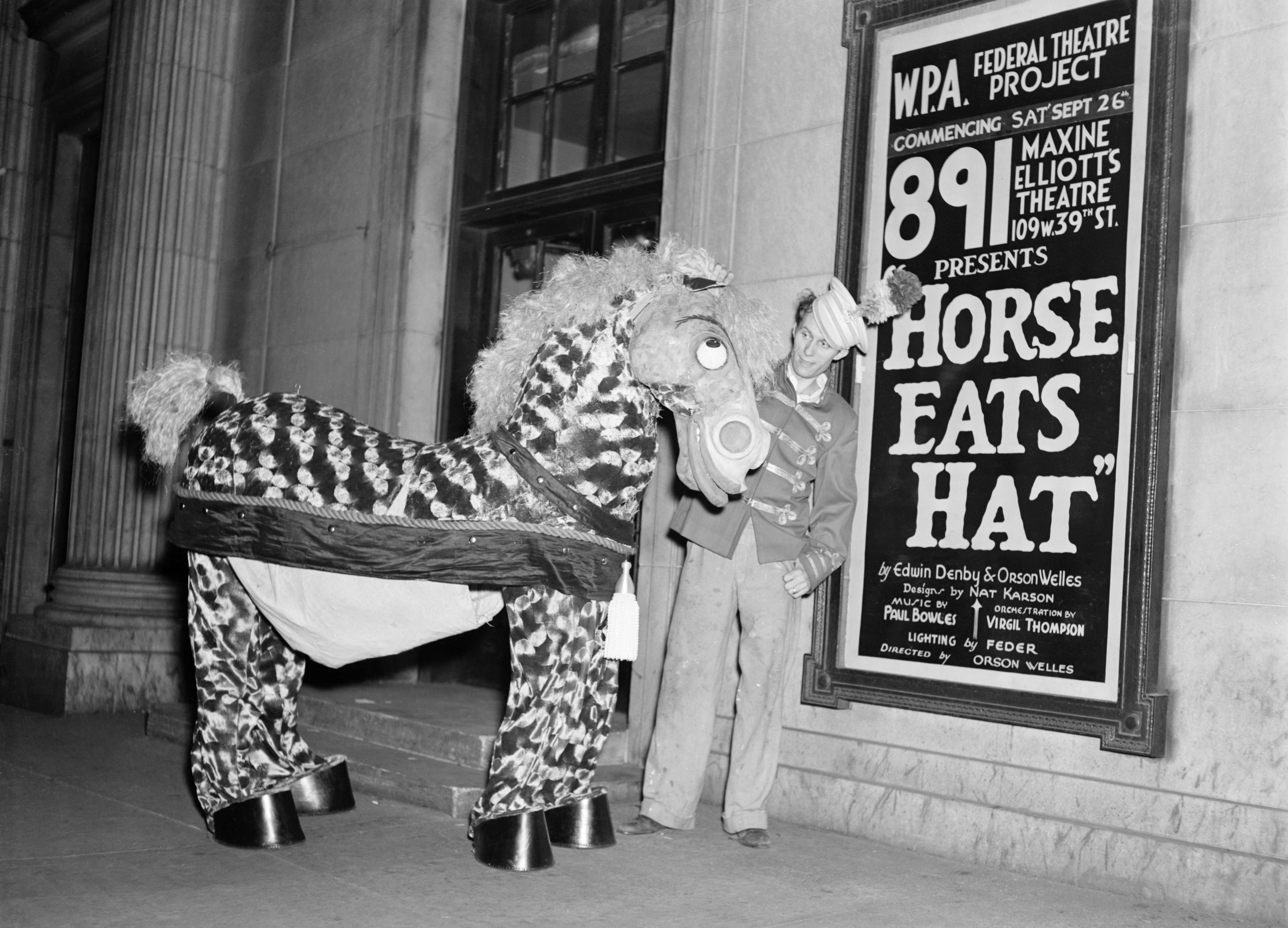
The horse (Carol King, Denby) and creator Bil Baird outside Maxine Elliott's Theatre

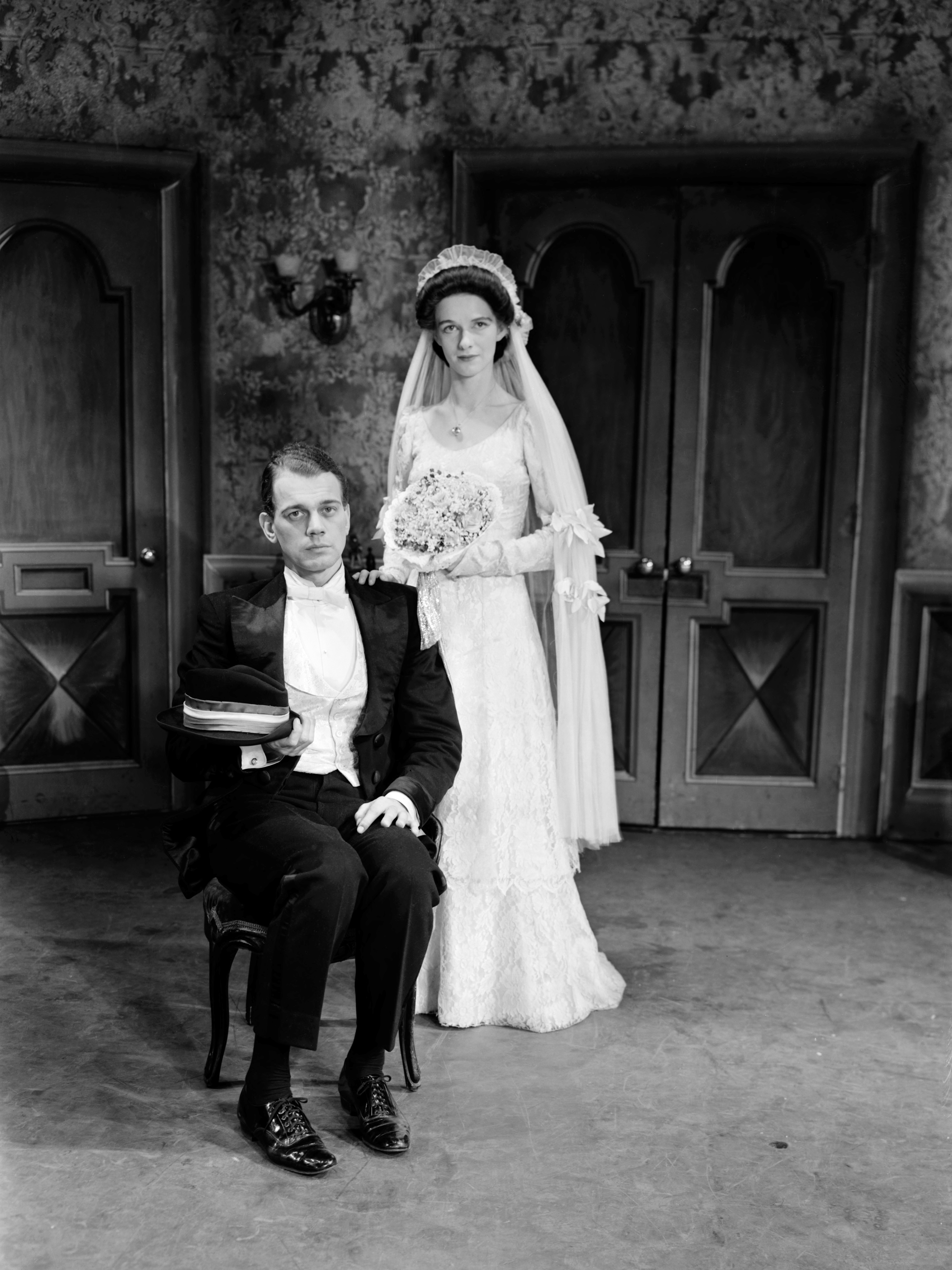
Cotten and Virginia Welles

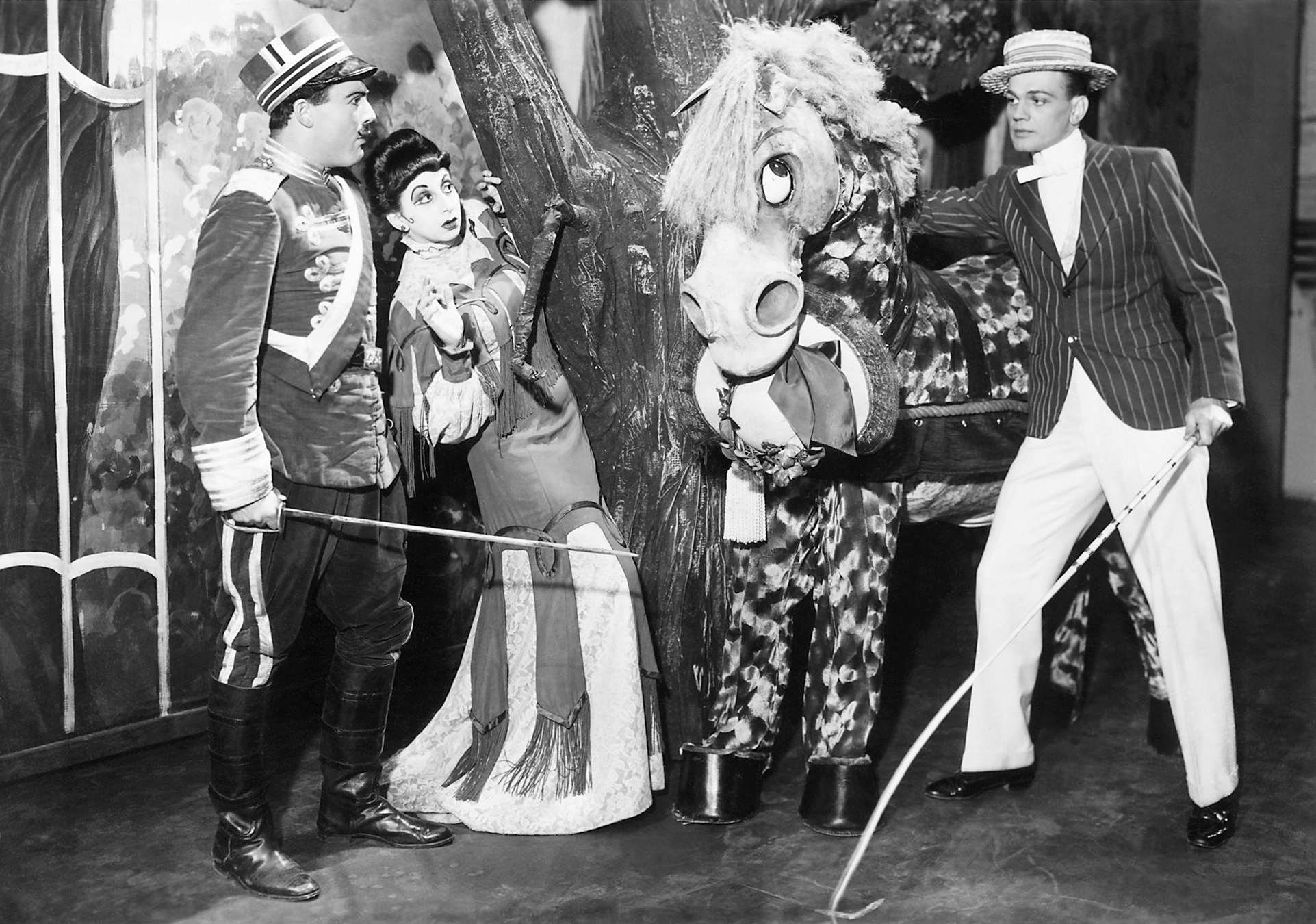
Sidney Smith, Paula Laurence and Cotten

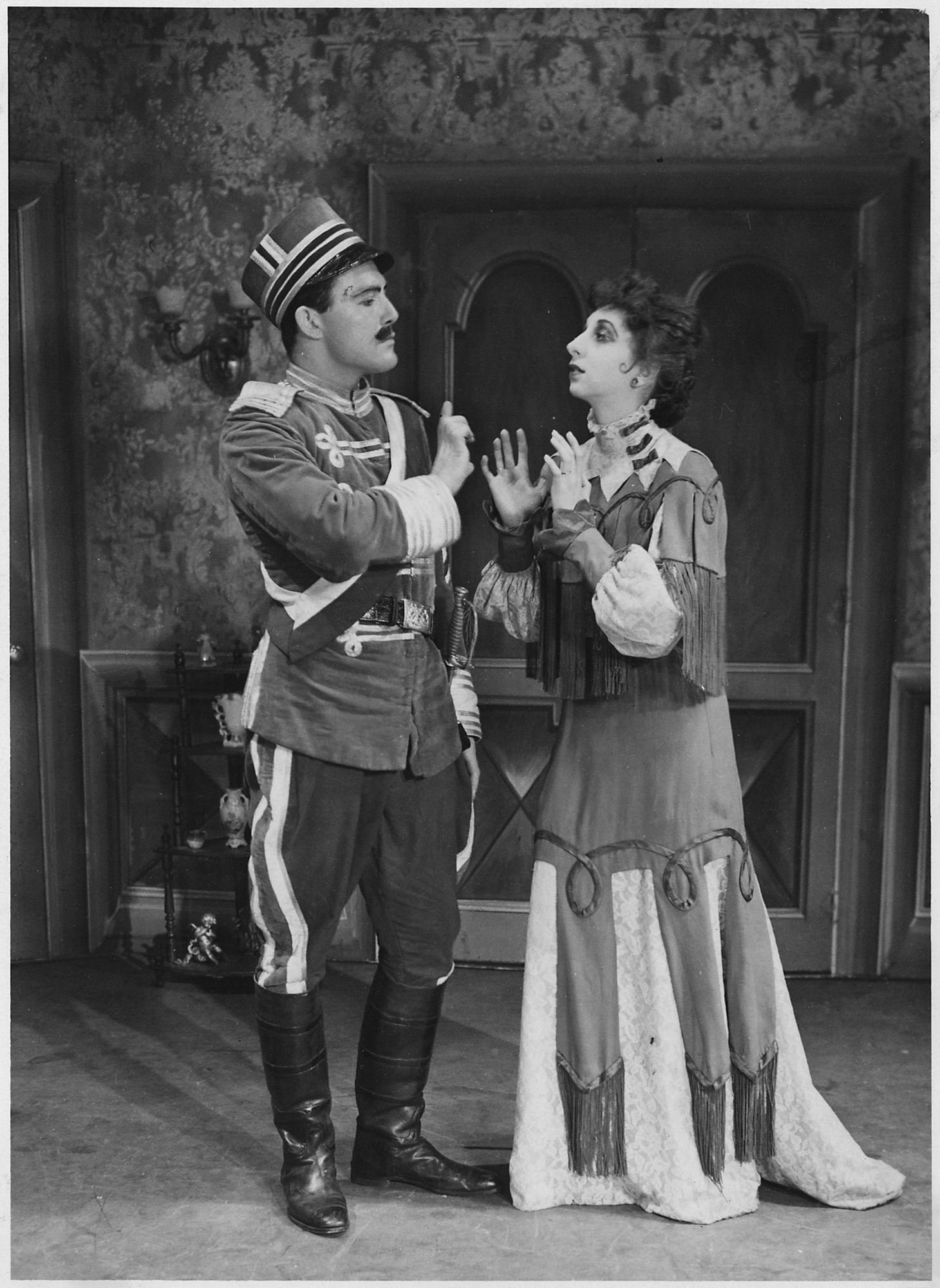
Smith and Laurence

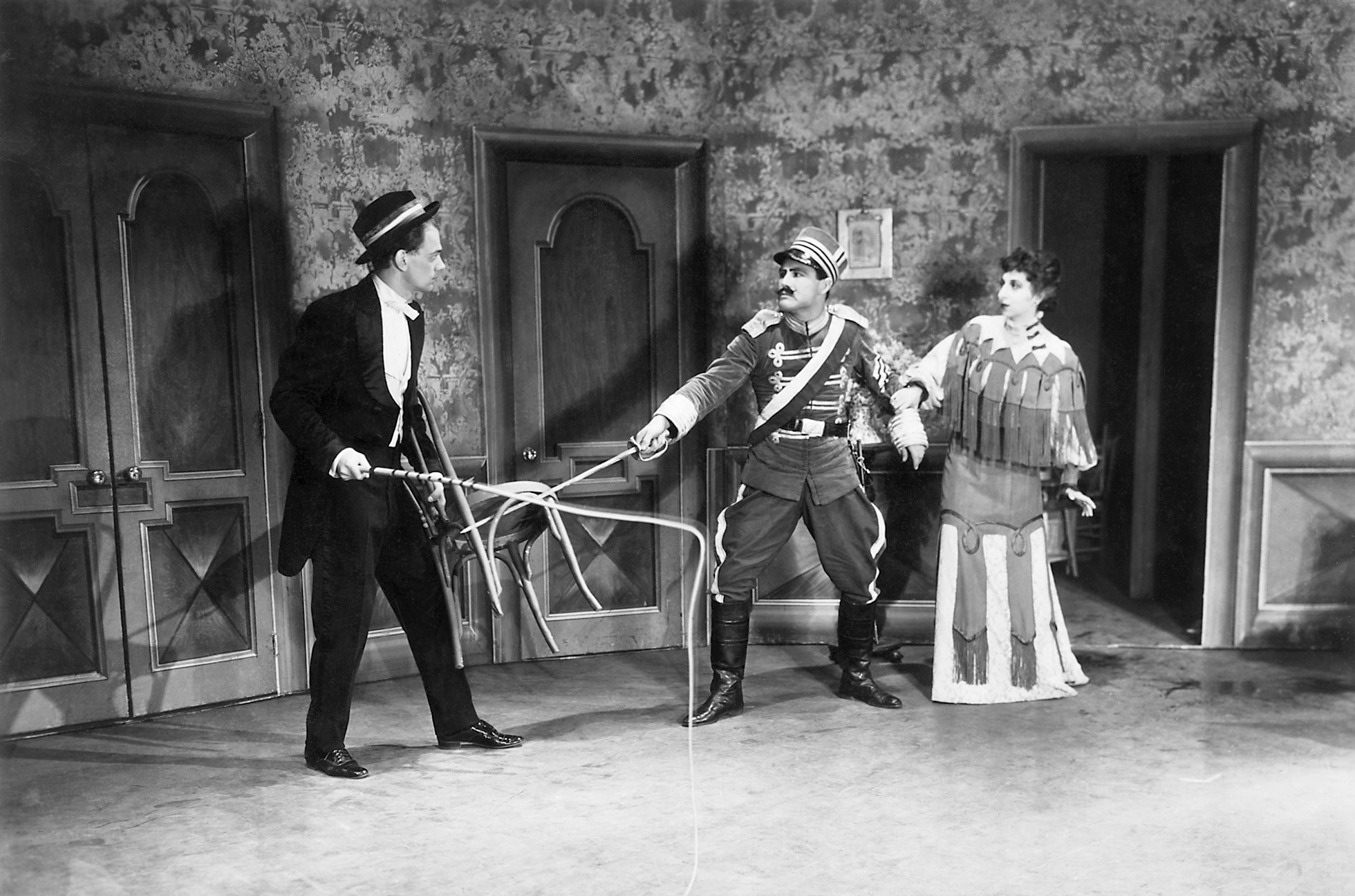
Cotten, Smith and Laurence

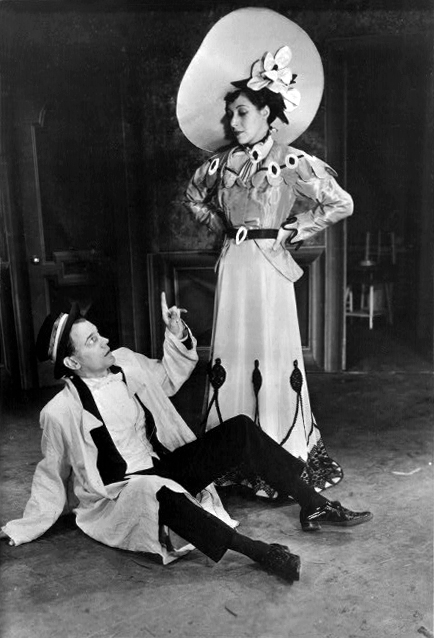
Cotten and Francis

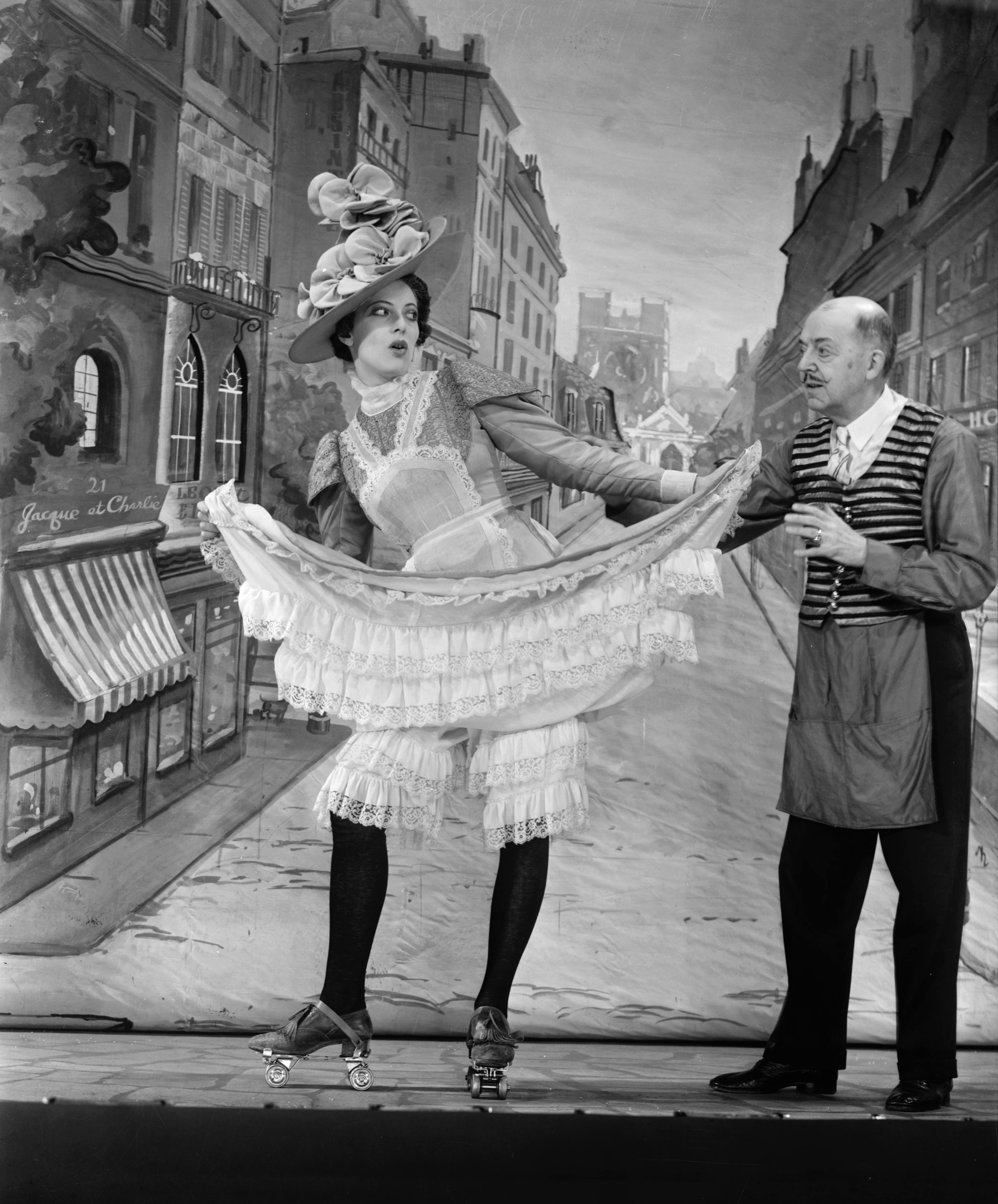
Henriette Kaye and Harry McKee

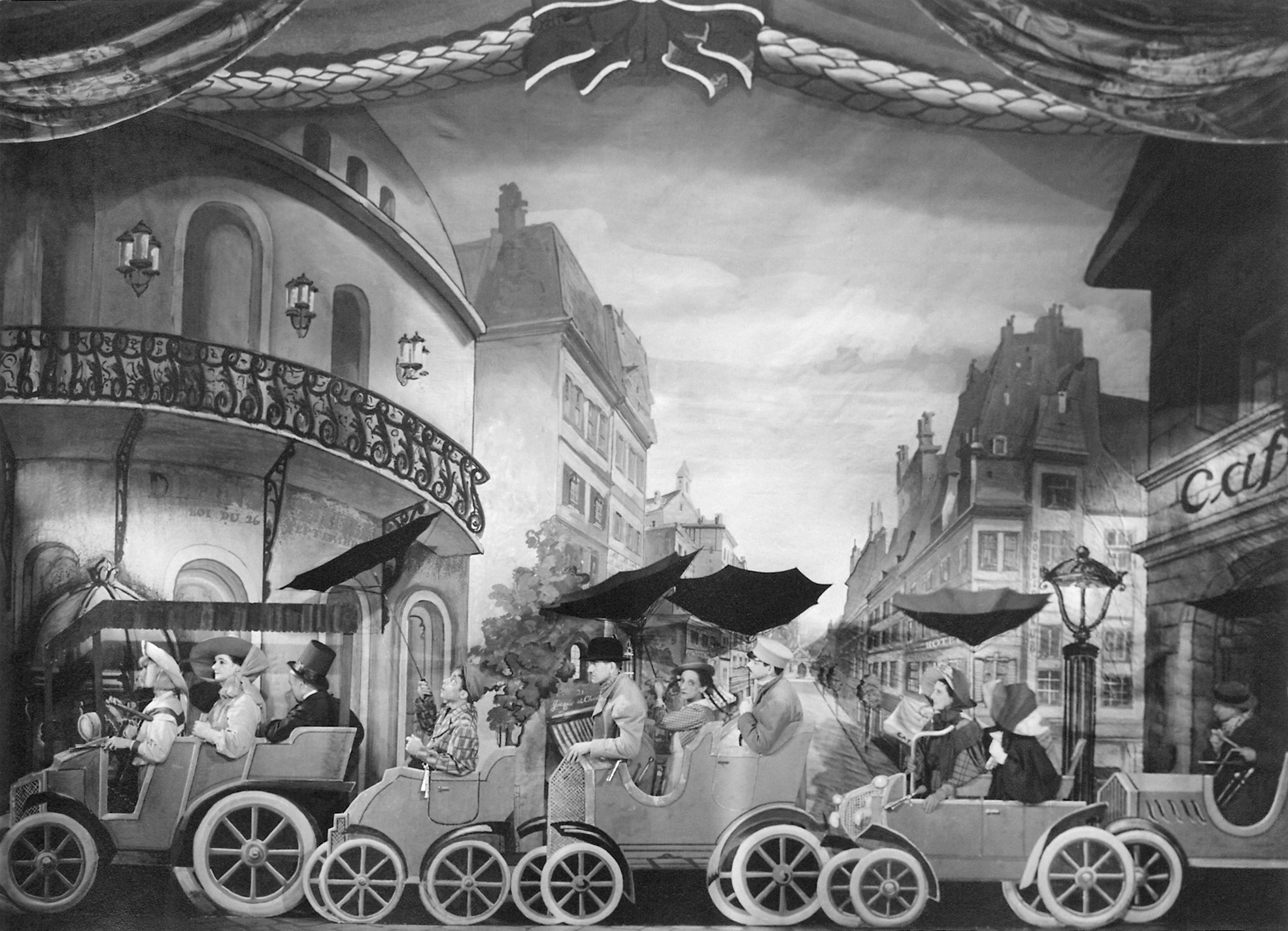
The wedding party on its way to the Countess's reception
