= Henny Backus =

American actress (1911–2004)

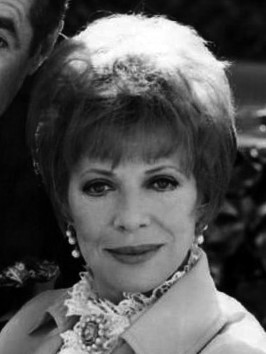
- Backus in 1969
- Born: Henrietta Kaye; March 21, 1911; Philadelphia, Pennsylvania, U.S.
- Died: December 9, 2004 (aged 93); Los Angeles, California, U.S.
- Resting place: Westwood Village Memorial Park Cemetery
- Other names: Henriette Kaye
- Occupation: Actress
- Years active: 1936–1981
- Spouses: Nat Karson; Jim Backus (m. 1943; died 1989)

Henny Backus (born Henrietta Kaye, March 21, 1911 – December 9, 2004) was an American actress who was a Broadway showgirl in the 1930s. She played in Orson Welles's Horse Eats Hat. She was the wife of actor and comedian Jim Backus.

== Career ==
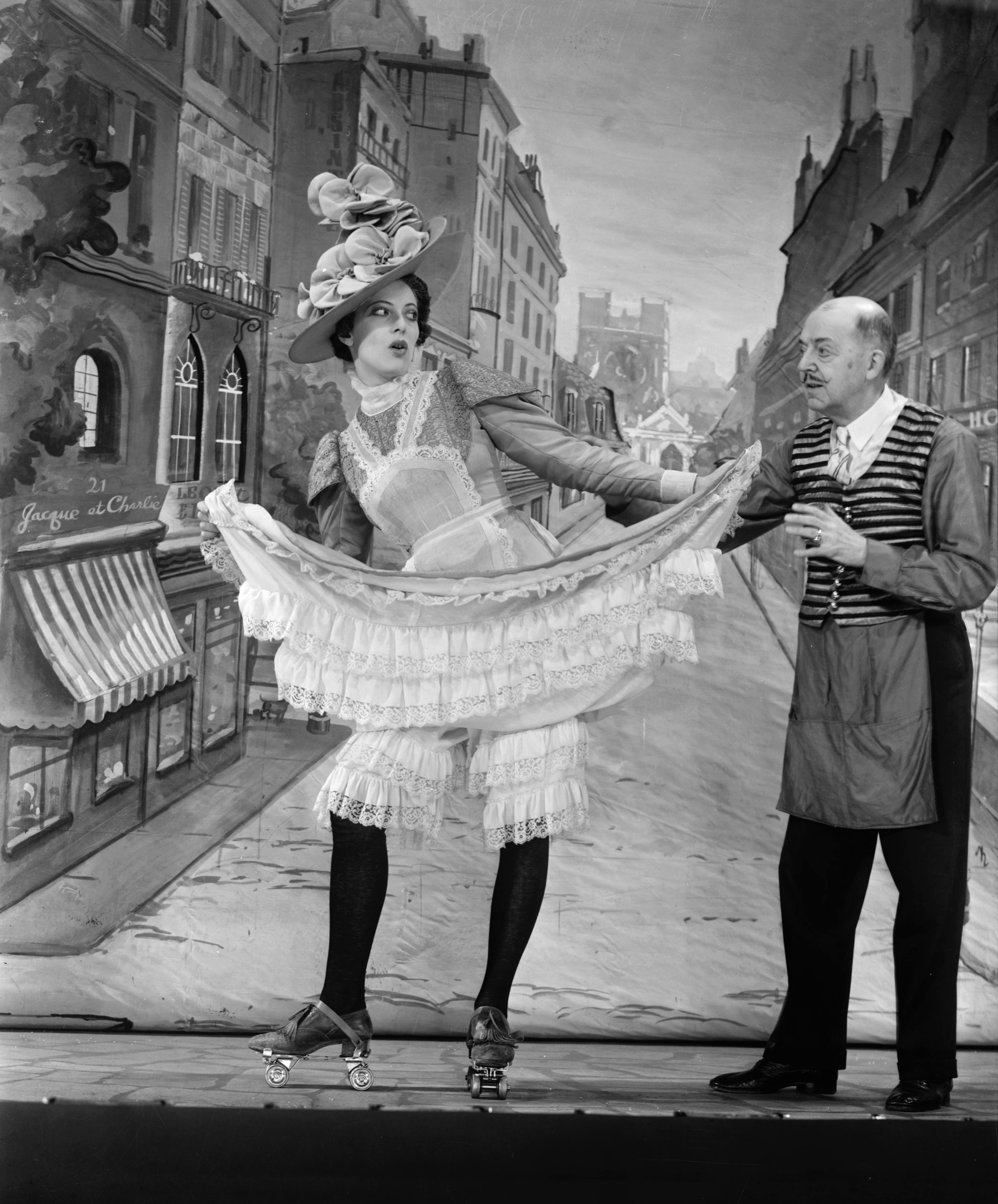
Kaye in Orson Welles's surrealistic farce Horse Eats Hat (1936)

She had the role of Bee in the Broadway play Chrysalis (1932). Working as Henriette Kaye, she was a member of the Federal Theatre Project. Described by The New York Times as "a leggy redhead with a droll sense of humor", she appeared in Orson Welles's Project 891 production Horse Eats Hat (1936), a surrealistic farce co-starring Welles, Joseph Cotten, Hiram Sherman and Arlene Francis. Her husband, Nat Karson, designed the sets and costumes.

Kaye married actor and comedian Jim Backus in 1943. The couple co-starred in the 1960s television series Blondie, and they performed together once on Gilligan's Island, in the sitcom's second-season episode "Gilligan's Mother-In-Law" (1965). She appeared too with her husband in a season-five episode of The Love Boat.

Henny and Jim Backus co-authored several humorous books, including What Are You Doing After the Orgy? (1962), Only When I Laugh (1965), Backus Strikes Back (1984), and Forgive Us Our Digressions (1988). Henny also wrote Care for the Caretaker (1999), documenting her husband's battle with Parkinson's disease and offering practical solutions for those facing such dilemmas.
