= Golby =

Golby is a surname. Notable people with the surname include:

- Alexandra Golby, American neurosurgeon
- Mitch Golby (born 1991), Australian rules footballer

== See also ==
- Colby (surname)
