= Hotchkiss School =

Prep school in Connecticut, US

The Hotchkiss School

Location
- 11 Interlaken Road; Lakeville, Connecticut 06039; United States; 41°56′43″N 73°26′23″W

Information
- Type: Private, day and boarding school
- Motto: Latin: Moniti Meliora Sequamur (Guided by each other, let us seek better paths (Note: The motto comes from Book III of the Aeneid: cedamus Phoebo et moniti meliora sequamur. In context, a more literal translation might read "Let us follow better counsel," or more fully, "Let us yield to Phoebus and at his warning pursue the better course." The school previously translated this phrase as "Having been admonished, let us follow better ways," and "After instruction, let us move on to pursue higher things." In 2017, it changed the translation to the current version.))
- Religious affiliation: Nonsectarian
- Established: 1891 (135 years ago)
- CEEB code: 070335
- Head of school: Anne Bruder
- Grades: 9–12, post-graduate
- Gender: Co-educational (since 1974)
- Enrollment: 614 (2024–25)
- Campus size: 827 acres (3 km^{2})
- Campus type: Rural
- Colors: Yale blue and white
- Athletics: 19 interscholastic sports
- Mascot: Bearcat
- Nickname: Hotchkiss Bearcats
- Rivals: Taft School
- Newspaper: The Record
- Yearbook: The Mischianza
- Endowment: $553.9 million (June 30, 2023)
- Tuition: Boarding: $71,170; Day: $60,490
- Affiliation: Eight Schools Association; Ten Schools Admission Organization; Founders League; New England Preparatory School Athletic Council (NEPSAC); New England Association of Schools and Colleges (NEASC); The Association of Boarding Schools (TABS); Global Education Benchmark Group (GEBG); Round Square; Green Schools Alliance
- Alumni: Pythians or Olympians
- Website: hotchkiss.org

The Hotchkiss School is a private college-preparatory day and boarding school in Lakeville, Connecticut. It educates approximately 600 students in grades 9–12, plus postgraduates. Founded in 1891, it was one of the first English-style boarding schools in the United States and an early proponent of student financial aid, having accepted scholarship students since its inception.

Hotchkiss is a member of the Eight Schools Association and Ten Schools Admission Organization, two groups of American boarding schools. It was also a founding member of the G20 Schools group, an international association of college-preparatory high schools.

The school's list of notable alumni includes Supreme Court justice Potter Stewart, Nobel laureate Dickinson Richards, Morgan Stanley co-founder Harold Stanley, and Yale University president A. Whitney Griswold.

== History ==
=== Early years and developing reputation ===
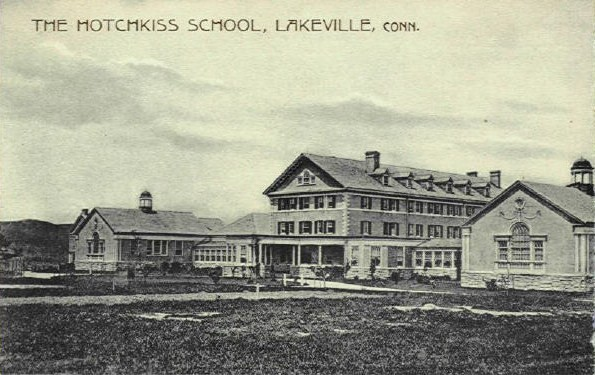
Postcard circa 1905, showing the old academic building, which was demolished in the 1960s.

In 1891, Maria Hotchkiss, the heir to her late husband Benjamin's armaments fortune, founded Hotchkiss School in her hometown of Lakeville, Connecticut. Although Hotchkiss had intended to establish a small school of roughly 50 students that would educate local boys for free, her chief advisor, Yale University president Timothy Dwight, wanted to use Hotchkiss' millions to establish a feeder school for Yale. He hired key staff from Phillips Academy (Andover), a traditional Yale feeder school, and placed several members of the Yale community on the board of trustees. The school focused heavily on preparing students for Yale's entrance exams, and by the early 1920s Hotchkiss was consistently beating Andover's scores at the College Boards.

The newly constituted Hotchkiss School was an instant success, and the graduating class of 1896 sent twenty-eight of its thirty graduates to Yale. That same year, Hotchkiss enrolled its first international student, the Catalan-Puerto Rican José Camprubí; in addition, Chinese students have attended Hotchkiss since 1912. Buoyed by its college placement record, the school grew rapidly. In 1902, the school had 145 students. By 1909, it already had a national student body, attracting 223 students from 29 states; of that year's forty-six graduates, thirty went to Yale. By 1926, Hotchkiss already enrolled 333 students. The school remained at roughly 300–350 students until the advent of coeducation in 1974.

From the start, Hotchkiss offered what was (for its day) an extensive scholarship program; through the 1920s, approximately 10% of Hotchkiss students were on full scholarships. (Today, 9.6% of Hotchkiss students are on full scholarships, and another 27% receive some amount of financial aid.) However, scholarship students and paying students were not treated with total equality: as late as the 1970s, only the scholarship boys were required to perform chores on campus. During World War I, the First Yale (Aviation) Unit was sarcastically dubbed "The Millionaire's Unit"; many of its key members were Hotchkiss graduates.

Following Maria Hotchkiss' death in 1901, the school cultivated ties to Midwestern industrialists, who became some of Hotchkiss' most important donors. The Ford family of Michigan built the school library; Ohio newspaperman Paul Block donated the chapel; and automobile magnate Walter Chrysler paid for the infirmary. By 1920, the reputation was sufficiently established that Minnesota native F. Scott Fitzgerald's This Side of Paradise poked fun at Hotchkiss and its athletics rival Taft for "prepar[ing] the wealth of the Middle West for social success at Yale." The school's history speculated that Hotchkiss developed these ties because older New England boarding schools "looked askance at first- or second-generation wealth, especially if its possessors resided beyond the Northeast."

=== The disciplinarians and the gentlemen ===
Over the years, the school acquired a reputation for gentility, fostered by long-serving headmaster George Van Santvoord, a former Yale professor and 1908 Hotchkiss graduate who ran the school from 1926 to 1955. Van Santvoord said that at his Hotchkiss there was only one school rule: "Be a gentleman"—a principle he inherited from his own Hotchkiss headmaster, Huber Buehler. (The phrase dates back to an 1893 student publication.)

Although Van Santvoord de-emphasized Hotchkiss' traditional focus on college entrance examinations, Hotchkiss continued to send large numbers of students to Yale; sociologist Jerome Karabel calculated that in the 1930s, "more students came to New Haven from Hotchkiss than from the combined public school systems of New York, Boston, and Philadelphia." Van Santvoord found an ideological ally in Yale president James Rowland Angell, who declared at a Hotchkiss alumni dinner that college entrance examinations were "disastrous" for secondary education. When Van Santvoord announced his retirement in 1954, Time magazine stated that "of all U.S. prep schools, few, if any, can beat the standards Hotchkiss has set". (The man in charge of Time was Henry Luce, a Hotchkiss fundraiser and former Hotchkiss scholarship student.)

Under Van Santvoord, Hotchkiss became the first of the post-1884 American boarding schools to accept black students when Marcellus Winston '55 matriculated in 1951. He also abolished hazing in 1930. However, Van Santvoord strongly opposed co-education, and due to his continuing influence over the school's board of trustees, Hotchkiss did not begin accepting girls until nearly two decades after his retirement. Under his leadership, Hotchkiss' financial aid resources "largely went to the nouveau poor, well-to-do families who had taken their lumps during the Great Depression." He also opposed (unsuccessfully) proposals to start a summer school for low-income students.

Neither did Van Santvoord fully dislodge the school's no-second-chances approach to student discipline, which was facetiously compared to "Stalag 17". Twenty-five years after his retirement, The New York Times wrote that Hotchkiss "has long been known for its strict rules and the alacrity with which it expels youngsters who break them." Recognizing this reputation, Hotchkiss invited a former student, C. D. B. Bryan, to write the introduction to the official history of the school, in which Bryan recounts how Hotchkiss expelled him "for having an electric coffeepot and smoking a Lucky Strike."

=== Modernizing Hotchkiss ===
A. William "Bill" Olsen became headmaster in 1960 and proceeded to relax many of the austerities of life at Hotchkiss. He introduced new holidays to the school calendar (at the time, only seniors were allowed to go home for Thanksgiving), allowed students to keep radios in their dormitories, legalized smoking and drinking (in Connecticut, eighteen-year-olds may drink alcohol under specific circumstances), and moderated the system of punishments and expulsions. He also abolished compulsory Sunday chapel attendance in 1970; although Hotchkiss had been nonsectarian since its founding, the extent of its ecumenicism had been to allow Catholics to attend Sunday Mass at 9:00 a.m. as long as they attended the school's official Protestant service later that day.

The school also took steps to diversify its student body. In 1953, with Hotchkiss' help, Hotchkiss alumnus Eugene Van Voorhis '51 established the Ulysses S. Grant Foundation to assist minority New Haven students with the prep school application process. Hotchkiss has also participated in other recruitment initiatives from the 1960s onward, such as A Better Chance (ABC), Prep for Prep, and the Greater Opportunity (GO) summer program for inner-city students. In 1974, Hotchkiss began admitting girls (but not before certain board members nearly succeeded in firing Olsen to prevent it), and as of 2014 there was an approximately 50–50 gender balance in the student body. To limit the number of male students who would be rejected as a result of this change, Hotchkiss agreed to increase the size of the student body from 350 to 500 students.

=== International relations and diversity ===
In 1928, the school joined the English-Speaking Union and established the International Schoolboy Exchange. Established by the class of 1948, the Fund for Global Understanding enables student participation in summer service projects across the world. The school additionally offers a School Year Abroad program.

In 2010, Hotchkiss partnered with Peking University High School to establish its study abroad, international division called Dalton Academy. Hotchkiss is a member of the Global Education Benchmark Group (GEBG), the Round Square group, and the Confucius Institute International Division (Hanban).

Today, 42% of U.S. Hotchkiss students identify as people of color, up from 33% in 2018–19. To recruit U.S. students from "historically underrepresented" backgrounds, Hotchkiss pays for certain prospective applicants and their guardians to visit the campus during the admissions process. 14% of the student body is international.

== Finances ==
=== Tuition and financial aid ===
Tuition and fees for the 2024–2025 academic year are $71,170 for boarding students and $60,490 for day students. 37% of the student body is on financial aid, and the average aid grant is $62,075. The school's goal is for half the student body to be on financial aid by 2028. In addition, the school commits to meet 100% of an admitted student's demonstrated financial need, and awards full scholarships to 26% of students on financial aid (9.6% of the student body).

=== Endowment and expenses ===
As of June 30, 2023, Hotchkiss' financial endowment was $553.9 million. In its Internal Revenue Service filings for the 2021–22 school year, Hotchkiss reported total assets of $760.3 million, net assets of $665.5 million, investment holdings of $549.5 million, and cash holdings of $9.2 million. Hotchkiss also reported $61.1 million in program service expenses and $12.9 million in grants (primarily student financial aid).

In April 2025, Hotchkiss announced a new fundraising campaign, with an initial goal of $250 million. The campaign is expected to last until the end of 2026.

== Controversies ==
=== Sexual abuse investigation ===
In 2015, a former student sued the school, alleging that he had been raped and sexually harassed in "an environment of well-known and tolerated sexual assaults, sexually violent hazing, and pedophilia." He said his dormitory master and instructor had drugged him and lured him to his quarters where he was raped.

As a result of this complaint and others, Hotchkiss retained two law firms to conduct an investigation into potential sexual abuse at Hotchkiss. The investigators interviewed more than 150 people and reviewed more than 200,000 pages of documents. In 2018, the investigators reported that although at least seven former faculty members had abused students for years, school administrators failed to respond adequately or in a timely manner to credible reports of abuse. Specifically, the investigators explained that "Although not all sexual misconduct was reported contemporaneously, there were multiple reports made by survivors, other students, and faculty at or near the time of the abuse that should have spurred the school to action." (In 1992, the school fired one of these faculty members "after a thorough investigation", and publicly disclosed his dismissal. However, the school had previously allowed that faculty member to return to Hotchkiss after first suspending him following reports of sexual misconduct.) In 2020, the investigators released a supplementary report concerning an eighth faculty member. Hotchkiss announced that it would continue retaining the investigators in case any further victims come forward.

The school issued several apologies following the release of the report. A former headmaster who had been serving on the board of trustees resigned after cooperating with investigators. Representatives of the board of trustees said that information gathered in the course of the investigation would be turned over to law enforcement. In 2022, the school built a memorial garden to acknowledge "its commitment to preventing future cases" of abuse.

=== Encephalitis lawsuit ===
In 2017, following a jury trial and unsuccessful appeal, Hotchkiss was required to pay $41.5 million to a former student who contracted tick-borne encephalitis during a 2007 school trip to China. At trial, Hotchkiss had argued that the disease was not reasonably foreseeable, as "this is the only recorded case of this particular disease afflicting a traveler in China."

== Academics ==
=== Curriculum ===
Operating on a semester schedule, Hotchkiss offers a classical education, 224 courses, several foreign languages and study-abroad programs. The school offers advanced students the opportunity to try out academic research at a university in preparation for a final project; in recent years, students have worked at Yale, Harvard, and Stanford.

In 1991, The New York Times recognized Hotchkiss' summer program as a "Summer School for the Very Ambitious." In addition, Deerfield Academy's student newspaper asserts that "many consider The Hotchkiss School to be the leader in environmental awareness among the top prep schools in the country." In 2025, Niche ranked Hotchkiss the nation's top private high school.

=== Standardized testing ===
The Class of 2023's average combined SAT score was 1430 and its average combined ACT score was 31. The school abolished Advanced Placement classes ahead of the 2021–22 school year, explaining that it aims to offer an "upper-level elective curriculum that is more inquiry-driven and conceptually challenging than what the College Board offers." However, students who wish to take AP tests may do so.

=== College placement ===
In 2007, The Wall Street Journal stated that, compared to Choate Rosemary Hall and Deerfield Academy, Hotchkiss had more students accepted at Harvard, Princeton, and six other universities, but not Yale.

=== Notable faculty ===
- Robert Osborn, art and philosophy, noted illustrator

== Extracurricular activities ==
=== Athletics ===
Hotchkiss fields 19 interscholastic sports teams that primarily compete in the Founders League, an athletic conference within the New England Preparatory School Athletic Council. Hotchkiss' sailing teams compete in the Interscholastic Sailing Association's New England Schools Sailing Association (NESSA) district, and have won NESSA championships in every year a competition has been held since 2018. Its colors are Yale Blue and white, and its mascot is the bearcat. In addition, as a member of the Eight Schools Association, Hotchkiss' athletic director sits on the Eight Schools Athletic Council.

In 1933, Samuel Gottscho photographed the Hotchkiss baseball team, which appears in the Library of Congress' Gottscho-Schleisner Collection.

Hotchkiss and Taft School have a long-standing rivalry, owing in part to their proximity (both schools are located in Litchfield County) and in other part to their shared ties to the Midwest. On the final Saturday of the fall sport season, the two schools compete against each other in every sport.

=== Clubs ===
Hotchkiss offers more than 65 clubs, including The Record, a biweekly, student-run newspaper circulated on campus and among alumni, The Mischianza yearbook, BaHSA, a club celebrating the culture and rich history of Black and Hispanic members of the Hotchkiss community, the Hotchkiss Chorus music ensemble, and extensive service organizations such as the St. Luke's Society. Other notable organizations include Calliope, the all-girls a cappella group; Bluenotes, the all-boys a cappella group; the Hotchkiss Speech and Debate Team; and Food for Thought, the school's philosophy club. The school also hosts an annual student-run film festival, The Hotchkiss Film Festival, that attracts student filmmakers from all over the world to compete for prizes and a scholarship.

== Campus ==
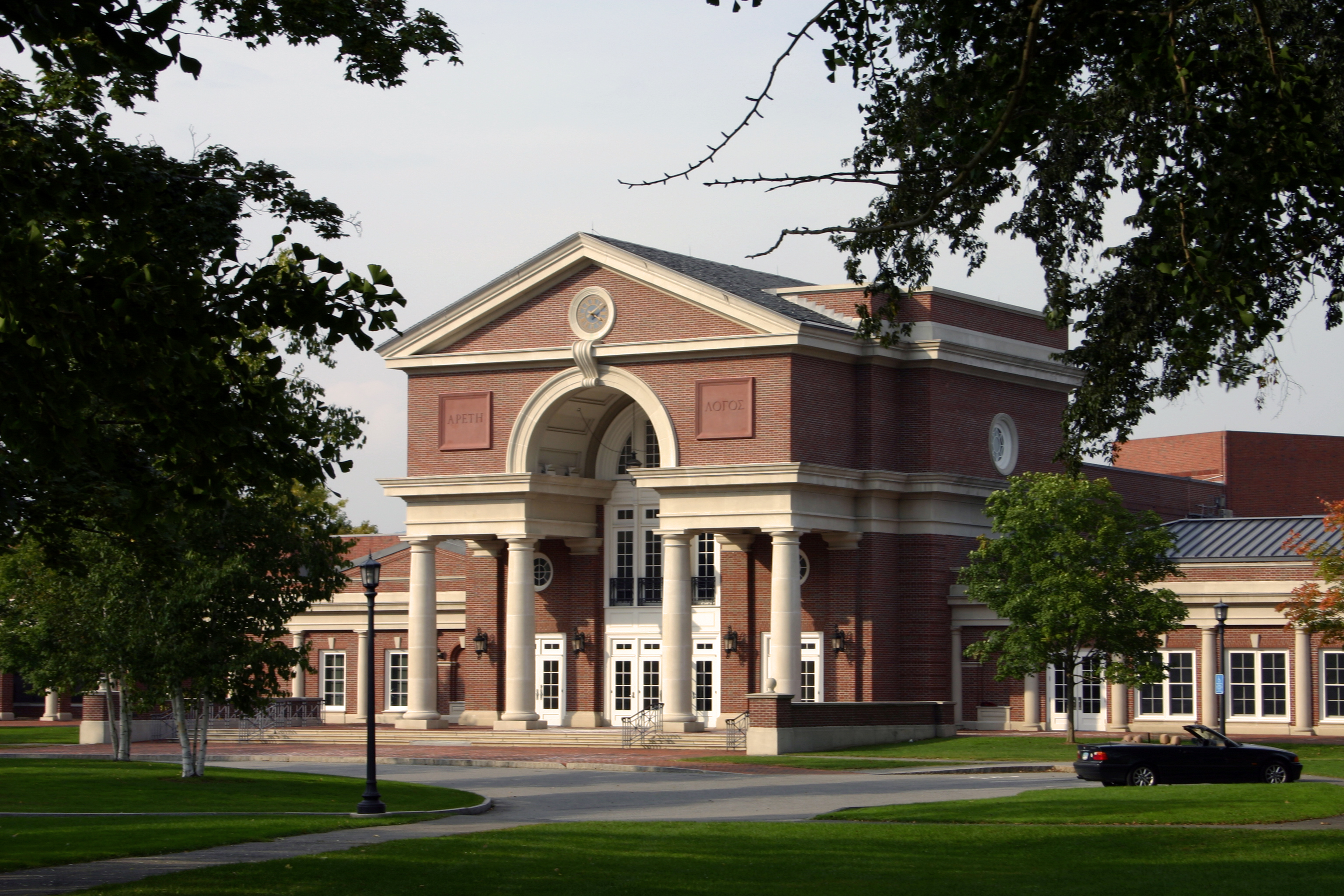
Main Building, academic and social center of Hotchkiss

The school overlooks the Berkshires on a rural, 827 acres (3 km^{2}) campus featuring 12 single-sex dorms and one all-gender dorm, two lakes, a nine-hole golf course, an educational farm, and one forest. The Main Building serves as the academic and social center, featuring 30 SmartBoard classrooms, the Edsel Ford Memorial Library with 87,000-volumes occupying 25,000 square feet, and dining halls.

An EPA Green Power Partner and Green Schools Ally, Hotchkiss requires all campus buildings to acquire LEED certification and was renovated to achieve the second highest, LEED Gold certification in 2008 and use 34% green power (ranked eighth largest, green K–12 school in 2009 by EPA), while upholding the Georgian architecture tradition from Bruce Price, Cass Gilbert, and Delano and Aldrich. The school renovation project earned Robert A.M. Stern Architects the 2010 Palladio Award, with Paul Rudolph and Butler Rogers Basket contributing elements of modern architecture.

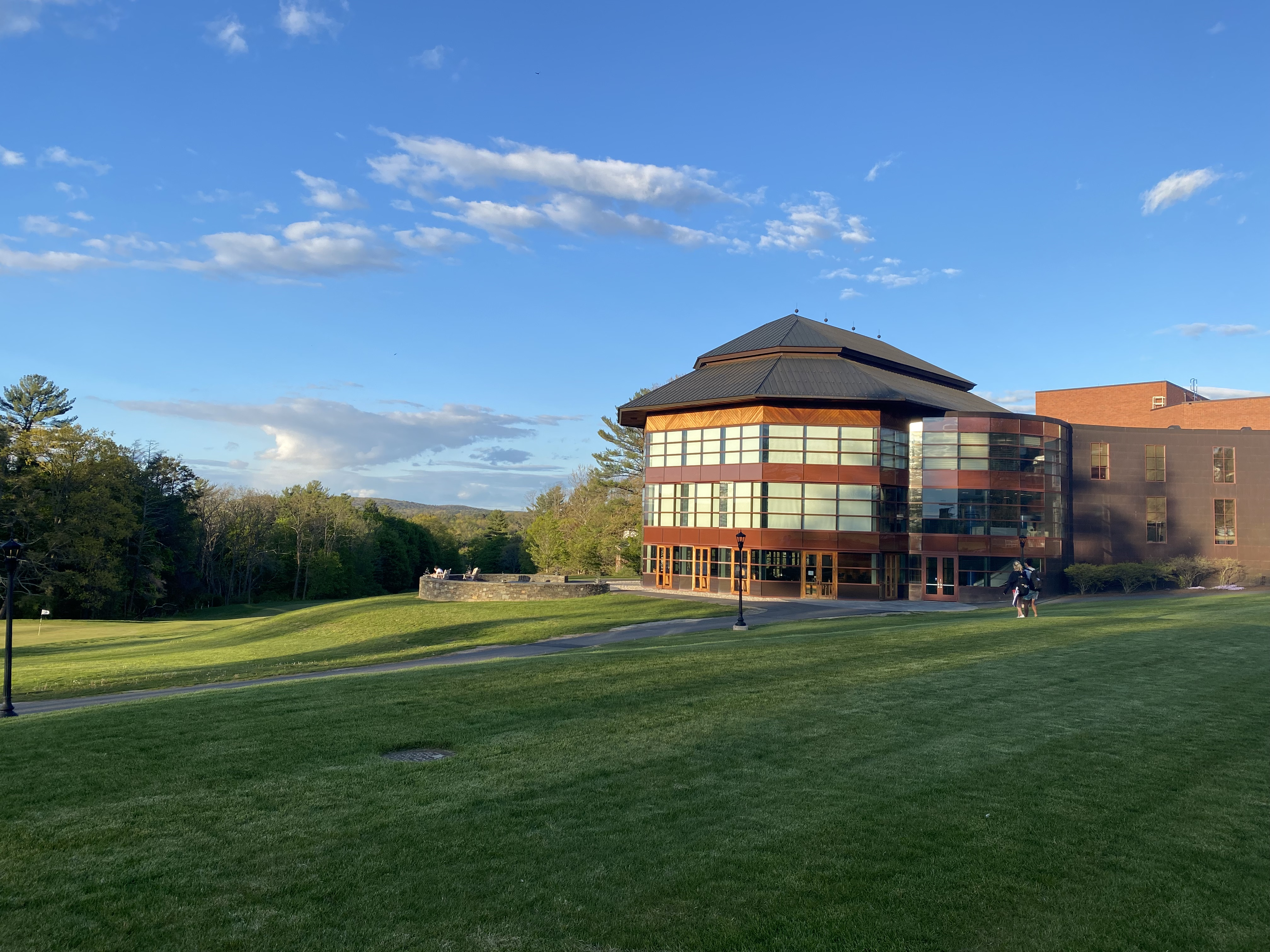
Esther Eastman Music Center (2021)

=== Art facilities ===
In 2005, Hotchkiss opened the 715-seat Esther Eastman Music Center, equipped with a handmade Fazioli F308 piano, 12 Steinway pianos, 12 practice rooms, 3 ensemble practice rooms, a WKIS radio station, and Musical Instrument Digital Interface (MIDI) lab. Hotchkiss also has a 615-seat proscenium theater called Walker Auditorium.

=== Athletic facilities ===
In 2002, Hotchkiss opened the Forrest E. Mars Jr. Athletic Center, a 212,000 square-foot athletic center with multi-purpose playing surfaces, elevated indoor exercise track, rinks, natatorium with 10-lane pool and separate diving well, basketball court, wrestling room, squash courts, indoor tennis courts, and a fitness center.

The Hotchkiss Golf Course is a nine-hole golf course of approximately 3,000 yards, designed by Seth Raynor in 1924 and rated by Golf Digest as one of the 25 best nine-hole courses in America. Hotchkiss also has the Baker Complex, including synthetic Sprole Field and many tracks, courts, and fields; three ponds; and extensive hiking trails.

== Notable alumni ==
Hotchkiss has been associated with manufacturing fortunes, including that of Ford, Chrysler, Mars, Edison, Cullman, Pillsbury, Dolby, Watson, and Revson. The school has also educated many members of the professional services industries. Financiers include Morgan Stanley co-founder Harold Stanley (1904), Lehman Brothers heir Robert Lehman (1908), and First National Bank heir George F. Baker Jr. Attorneys include Supreme Court justice Potter Stewart (1933), Debevoise & Plimpton founder Eli Whitney Debevoise (1917), and Solicitor General Robert Bork (1944).

Alumni in public service and academia include Nobel laureate Dickinson Richards (1913; Physiology 1956), a pioneer in cardiac catheterization; Yale University president A. Whitney Griswold (1924); Brookings Institution president Strobe Talbott (1964); foreign policy experts Paul Nitze (1924) and Roswell Gilpatric (1924); CIA Director Porter Goss (1956); Presiding Bishop of the Episcopal Church Henry Knox Sherrill (1907); and philanthropist MacKenzie Scott (1988).

In media and entertainment, notable journalists include Time co-founders Henry Luce (1916) and Briton Hadden (1915); television host Chris Wallace (1963); and Holocaust rescue leader Varian Fry (1926). Entertainment figures include Commissioner of Baseball and Columbia Pictures chair Fay Vincent (1958); Liverpool F.C. / Boston Red Sox chairman Tom Werner (1967); Metropolitan Museum of Art director Thomas Hoving (1949); filmmakers John Avildsen (1955) and Chris Meledandri (1977); and talent scout John Henry Hammond (1929). The school has educated four Pulitzer Prize winners, including three in the arts (Moore, Hersey, and MacLeish; Reiss won for nonfiction), two of whom got their first jobs in print journalism from Luce.

== In popular culture ==
- In 1947, Time reported that someone had penciled "Schuyler van Kilroy 3rd was here" in a Hotchkiss bathroom, a humorous variation of the popular expression "Kilroy was here."
- The school has been parodied in several The New Yorker cartoons.
