= Scott Meadow =

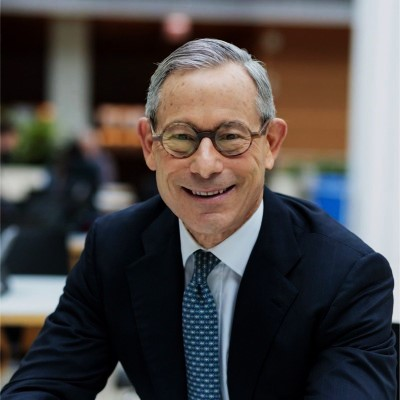
- Born: November 19, 1953; Cleveland, Ohio
- Education: AB Harvard College; MBA Harvard Business School
- Occupations: Academic and Venture Capitalist

Scott Meadow is an American venture capitalist and academic who is a faculty member of the University of Chicago Booth School of Business, where he is the Kaplan McCormack Family Clinical Professor of Entrepreneurship. Since 1982 he has been a principal investor in the venture capital and private equity industry. Since 1999 he has taught full-time at The University of Chicago Booth School of Business. Given his broad expertise within the entrepreneurial ecology, both in the field and in the academy, he has served as an advisor to a variety of PE/VC Funds. Since 2009 he has served as a testifying expert witness in commercial disputes both in the United States and internationally as well as functioning as a professional director and mentor to entrepreneurial enterprises.

== Early life and education ==
Scott Meadow was born in Cleveland, Ohio, and grew up in Dayton. He graduated from the Hotchkiss School in Lakeville, Connecticut. Meadow earned his A.B. magna cum laude from Harvard College in British history and literature, where he distinguished himself as a bodybuilding athlete, winning the Mr. New England, Mr. Collegiate U.S.A., and Mr. Northern States competitions.

After graduating, he worked as assistant to the president of Philips Industries, apprenticing for the entrepreneur Jesse Philips.

He completed his M.B.A. from Harvard Business School with concentrations in strategy and finance.

== Venture capital / private equity investing career ==
Meadow began work as an associate at William Blair Venture Partners and William Blair and Company in 1982. In 1983, he became a general partner at William Blair Venture Partners and a partner at William Blair and Company, where he was trained by the eminent venture capitalist, Sam Guren.

After a brief period at the Frontenac Company as a general partner, he joined the Sprout Group from 1995 to 2003.

In 2005, Meadow joined The Edgewater Funds, where he has served first as a general partner, later as an associate partner until 2024.

Representative investments include Coventry Corporation, HealthSouth, Sunrise Senior Living, Managed Health Network, Aspen Education Services, Ulta Beauty, MedPartners, the Sports Authority, CompUSA, and Staples Inc.. Professor Meadow served on the board of directors of National Equipment Services during its emergence from Chapter 11.

== Consultancy and Expert Testimony ==
In 2005, he formed Maroon Partners, a consultancy enterprise focused on advising entrepreneurial and private equity endeavors and providing expert witness support in commercial disputes.

He is an advisor to numerous private equity management firms and, since 2010, acted as a testifying expert, supported by the economic consulting firms Analysis Group, Coherent Economics, Compass Lexecon, Charles River Associates, NERA, and Brattle.

== Academic career ==
Since 1999, Meadow has held the position of clinical professor of entrepreneurship at the University of Chicago Booth School of Business. In 2024, Meadow was named the Kaplan McCormack Family Clinical Professor of Entrepreneurship.

Meadow has taught more than 15,000 students at Chicago Booth, in Entrepreneurial Finance and Private Equity, Commercializing Innovation (which he created), Introduction to Venture Capital and the New Venture Challenge courses. He is a member of the advisory board for the Innovation Fund at the University of Chicago. From 2007 to 2012, he served as the Faculty Director of Global Initiatives. He has taught internationally, including London, Paris, Brussels, Warsaw, Mumbai, Delhi, Bangalore, Singapore, São Paulo, Rio de Janeiro, Porto Alegre, Dubai, Abu Dhabi, Buenos Aires, Mexico City, Beijing, Shanghai and Hong Kong. He taught numerous executive education courses and served as an academic director for the Institutional Limited Partner Association.

== Awards and recognition ==
- Meadow was recognized in 1998 by Venture One as one of five outstanding healthcare service investors in the venture capital industry.
- Meadow was awarded the 2002, 2003, 2004, and 2005 Phoenix Prize and the Faculty Excellence Award in 2010.
- Meadow was designated by Business Week's "Guide to the Best Business Schools" (2003, 8th edition) and (2005, 9th edition) as one of the outstanding entrepreneurial professors in the country.
- In 2011, Meadow received the Richard J. Daley Award. The Daley Medal acknowledges a single individual who has given direct and extraordinary support to the state of Illinois by participating in or being an advocate for the venture capital and private equity industry.
- Meadow was presented the Young Leadership Award from the Jewish Federation of Metropolitan Chicago.
