= Goldsby (surname) =

Goldsby is a surname. Notable people with the surname include:

- Bryan Goldsby (born 1982), American mixed martial artist
- Crawford Goldsby (1876–1896), American outlaw
- Doug Goldsby (born 1986), Canadian football player
- Richard Goldsby, American biologist
- Robin Meloy Goldsby, American pianist and composer
- Walt Goldsby (1861–1914), American baseball player
