= Benjamin B. Hotchkiss =

American engineer

Benjamin Berkeley Hotchkiss
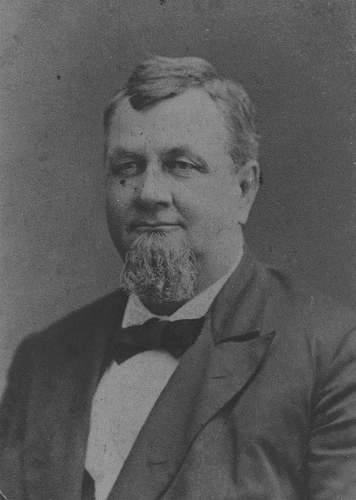
- Born: Benjamin Berkeley Hotchkiss; October 1, 1826; Watertown, Connecticut, USA
- Died: February 14, 1885 (aged 58); Paris, France
- Resting place: Hillside Cemetery, Sharon, Connecticut
- Occupations: Gunsmith, engineer
- Spouse(s): Maria Bissell Hotchkiss "Miss Cunningham"
- Parent(s): Asahel Augustus Hotchkiss; Althea Guernsey

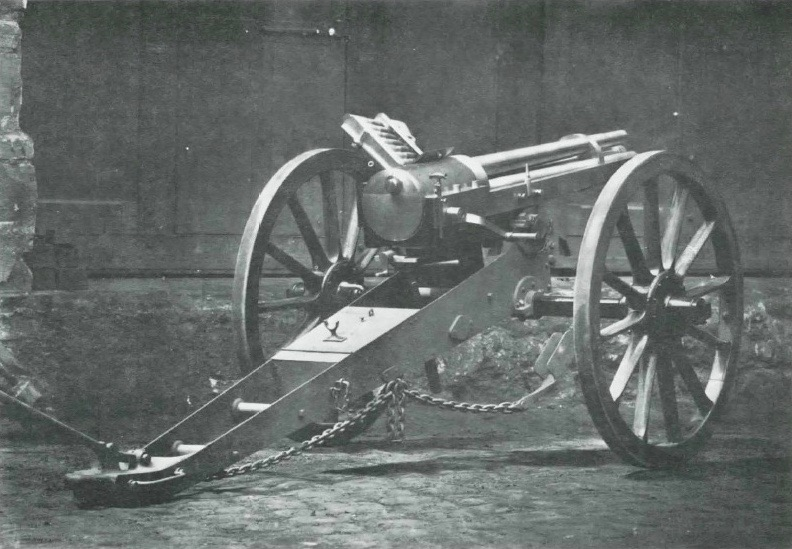
The Hotchkiss Revolving Cannon, 1874

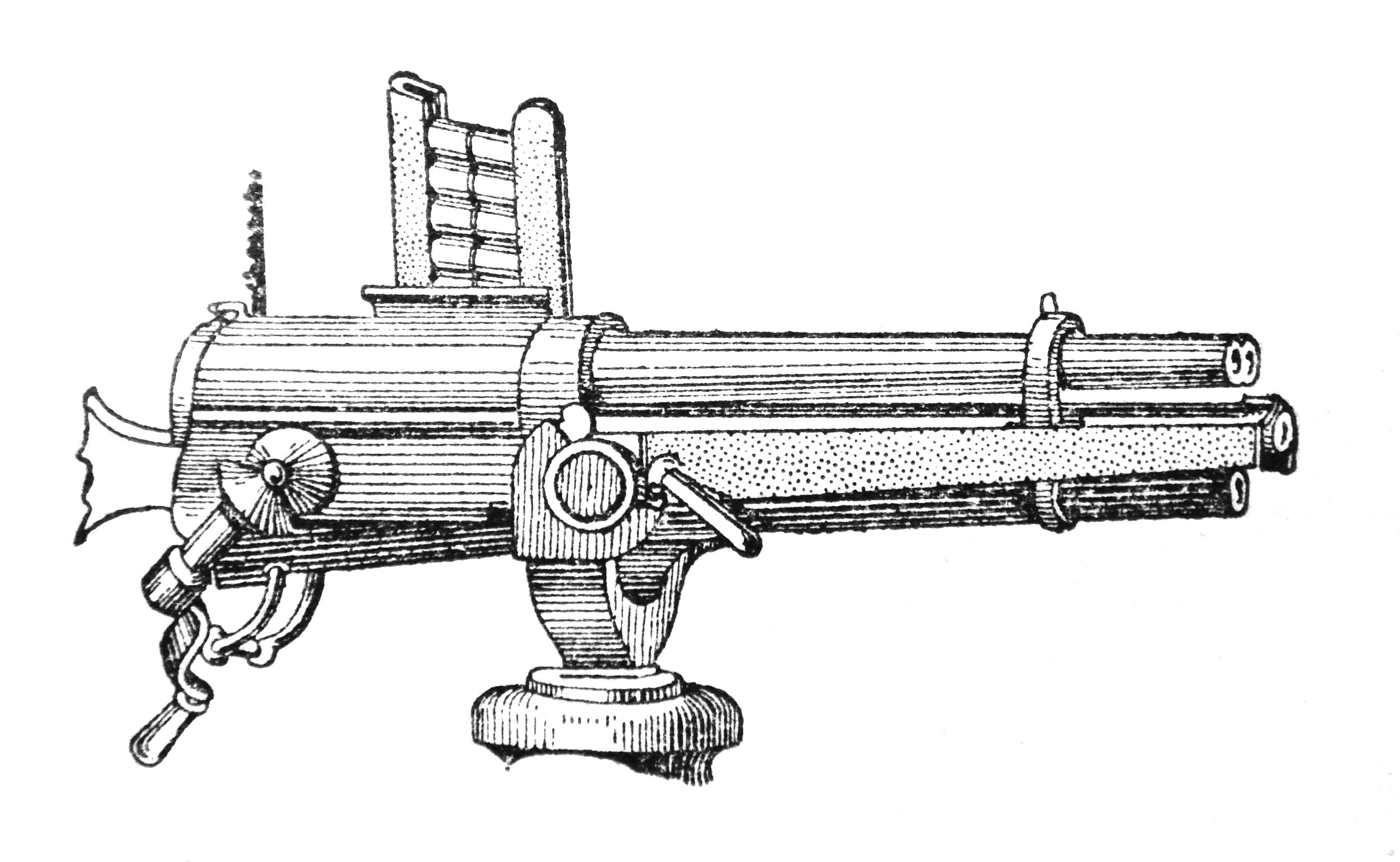
The Hotchkiss rapid fire 37 mm multi-barrel gun "canon-revolver", manufactured from 1879

Benjamin Berkeley Hotchkiss (October 1, 1826 – February 14, 1885) was one of the leading American ordnance engineers of his day.

== American career ==
Hotchkiss was born in Watertown, Connecticut, and moved to Sharon, Connecticut in childhood; his early experiments were made there in his father's hardware factory. Starting in the 1850s, he was employed as a gunmaker in Hartford, working on Colt revolvers and Winchester rifles.

Hotchkiss patented a line of projectiles for rifled artillery that were used extensively in the American Civil War.

== French career ==
After the American Civil War, the U.S. government showed little interest in funding new weapons. In 1867, Hotchkiss moved to France and set up a munitions factory, first in Viviez, near Rodez, then in Saint-Denis, near Paris, named Hotchkiss et Cie. At about this time, he developed a revolving barrel machine gun (in French: "canon-revolver") known as the Hotchkiss gun; the gun was made in four sizes from 37 mm to 57 mm, the largest intended for naval use. After his death, the Hotchkiss company also developed in 1897 and later manufactured in large numbers an air-cooled, gas-actuated infantry machine gun which was widely used by several countries, particularly France and the United States during the First World War.

== Personal life ==
On May 27, 1850, he married Maria Bissell Hotchkiss, who after his death founded The Hotchkiss School in Lakeville, Connecticut, and the Hotchkiss Library in Sharon. Hotchkiss committed bigamy when he married a Miss Cunningham in a French civil ceremony in Paris in 1867.
