= Green Schools Alliance =

US non-profit organization

- Abbreviation: GSA
- Formation: October 2007; 18 years ago
- Type: Nonprofit
- Tax ID no.: 13-3831327
- Legal status: 501(c)(3)
- Headquarters: New York, New York
- Website: www.greenschoolsalliance.org

Green Schools Alliance (GSA) is an effort by primary and secondary schools worldwide to address climate change and conservation challenges by creating a peer-to-peer network of school members committed to reducing their greenhouse gas emissions and accelerating the implementation of sustainable solutions.

GSA-member schools share and implement sustainability best practices and promote connections between schools, communities, and the environments that sustain them. GSA does this by creating peer-to-peer forums, exchanging resources, offering original programs and curriculum, and connecting youth to nature. The sustainability coordinators that participate in the network are composed of faculty, staff, students, administrators, and other school decision makers.

== History ==
The GSA was formed in October 2007 by Margaret Howard Watson as a result of Mayor of New York City Michael Bloomberg's PlaNYC and related challenge to all NYC facilities to reduce carbon emissions by 30% by 2050, with support from the NYC Mayor's Office of Long-Term Planning and Sustainability, New York State Energy Research and Development Authority (NYSERDA), Clinton Climate Initiative (CCI), Consolidated Edison, National Association of Independent Schools (NAIS) and National Business Officers Association (NBOA).

The Allen-Stevenson School in NYC hosted the first GSA planning session that convened schools to address climate change and "what schools can do about it", and review the GSA Commitment. With additional guidance from the American College & University Presidents' Climate Commitment (ACUPCC), Second Nature and AASHE, the GSA primary and secondary school climate commitment was further refined. In November 2007, with a signatory group of 40 schools, the GSA was launched to the public at the US Green Building Council annual GreenBuild Conference when President Bill Clinton highlighted the GSA in his keynote speech. It is currently listed as one of the organizations committed to the Climate Education and Literacy Initiative launched by the White House Office of Science and Technology Policy (OSTP).

== Green Schools Alliance today ==
The 501c3 nonprofit organization connects more than 9,000 schools, districts, and organizations worldwide, representing more than 5 million students in 48 U.S. states, the District of Columbia, and 88 countries. Schools participate individually or and as entire school districts to share sustainability best practices and reduce their environmental footprint. In January 2016, 21 school districts formed the Green Schools Alliance District Collaborative in pursuit of utilising their collective influence and resources. These districts build and share best practices and leverage their combined purchasing power to increase access to sustainable alternatives, promote market transformation, and influence policy decisions.

Membership to the GSA's online community is free. Schools and districts can also pledge the Sustainability Leadership, where principals, heads of school, and superintendents pledge to take action in these areas: Reduce Our Climate & Ecological Impact, Educate & Engage Our Community, and Transform Our Culture.

== Programs ==
GSA programs aim to integrate education and action, and aggregate and quantify progress. Using the building and campus as a teaching tool, students work alongside faculty and staff on projects from recycling, weatherizing, conducting energy audits, changing lights, and replacing old boilers to improving science and technology education, restoring wetlands, and planting green roofs. Best practices are intended to ripple outward from schools to families and to the workplace. GSA programs include:

- Green Cup Challenge
- Student Climate & Conservation Corps (Sc3)
- GSA Online Community
- GSA Sustainability Leadership Commitment
- GSA Purchasing Solution
- OnAir Schools
- protostar
- Sustainability Tracking and Roadmap Tool (START)

== See also ==
- Environmental groups and resources serving K–12 schools
