= Alexandra Golby =

American neurosurgeon and researcher

Alexandra Jacqueline Golby is a professor of neurosurgery at Harvard Medical School and the Haley Distinguished Chair in the Neurosciences at Brigham and Women’s Hospital. She graduated from Yale University with a degree in physics and philosophy. She attended medical school at Stanford Medical School, where she also did her neurosurgery residency. She was awarded the Congress of Neurological Surgeons' Dandy Fellowship to study with Professor Alim Louis Benabid in Grenoble, France.

Golby's research and clinical practice focus on image-guided neurosurgery, particularly in regards to patients with brain tumors and epilepsy. In addition to authoring over 150 publications, she edited Image Guided Neurosurgery, a comprehensive review of the field.

== Notable publications ==
- Differential responses in the fusiform region to same-race and other-race faces (2001) Golby, AJ; Gabrieli, JD; Chiao, JY; Eberhardt, JL (2001). "Differential responses in the fusiform region to same-race and other-race faces". Nature Neuroscience. 4 (8): 845–50. doi:10.1038/90565. PMID 11477432. S2CID 16699355.
- Material-specific lateralization in the medial temporal lobe and prefrontal cortex during memory encoding (2001) Golby, AJ; Poldrack, RA; Brewer, JB; Desmond, JE; Spencer, D; Aron, AP (2001). "Material-specific lateralization in the medial temporal lobe and prefrontal cortex during memory encoding". Brain. 124 (9): 1841–1857. doi:10.1093/brain/124.9.1841. PMID 11522586.
- Memory lateralization in medial temporal lobe epilepsy assessed by functional MRI (2002) Golby, AJ; Poldrack, RA; Illes, J; Chen, D; Desmond, JE; Gabrieli, JD (2002). "Memory lateralization in medial temporal lobe epilepsy assessed by functional MRI". Epilepsia. 43 (8): 855–863. doi:10.1046/j.1528-1157.2002.20501.x. PMID 12181004.
- Memory encoding in Alzheimer's disease: an fMRI study of explicit and implicit memory (2005) Golby, AJ; Silverberg, G; Race, E; Gabrieli, S; Oshea, J; Knierim, K (2005). "Memory lateralization in medial temporal lobe epilepsy assessed by functional MRI". Brain. 128 (4): 773–787. doi:10.1093/brain/awh400. PMID 15705615.
- Functional brain mapping and its applications to neurosurgery (2007) Golby, AJ; Tharin, S (2007). "Functional brain mapping and its applications to neurosurgery". Operative Neurosurgery. 60 (suppl_4, 1 April 2007): 185–202. doi:10.1227/01.NEU.0000255386.95464.52. PMID 17415154. S2CID 1727400.
