= Frightful Cave =

Archaeological site in Mexico

- Cueva Espantosa
- location in Mexico
- 27°26′13″N 101°42′21″W
- Associated with: hunter-gatherer groups
- Location: Sierra Madre Oriental, Coahuila
- Region: Mexico

Site notes
- Excavation dates: 1950s and 1960s
- Archaeologists: Walter W. Taylor

Frightful Cave (Spanish: Cueva Espantosa) is a pre-Columbian archaeological site located in the state of Coahuila in northern Mexico. It was occupied on several occasions during the Archaic period by what seem to be nomadic hunter-gatherer groups and is an important source of archaeological evidence concerning the ancient desert tradition of the Central Mexican highlands.

== Overview ==
Located in the Sierra Madre Oriental in the Northern Arid Zone of Mexico, Frightful Cave is surrounded by desert. The area is “largely too arid and rainfall is too undependable for cultivation," although edible plants can be found and the mountain ranges are covered in pine and oak forest. Many groups seem to have lived in the Coahuila region despite this arid climate, but they did not practice agriculture. The early desert culture started here in the Archaic period has been identified as one of the roots of later Mesoamerican cultures, and lasted through to the 19th century among Indigenous peoples of the Great Basin (such as the Paiute and the Shoshone) and among some native peoples of the Mexican Northern Arid Zone (such as the Seri).

== Discovery and excavation ==
The archaeologist Walter W. Taylor excavated many sites in Northern Mexico and the Southern United States, focusing on Coahuila in the 1950s and 1960s. Radio-carbon dating places the Frightful Cave artifacts between approximately 7,500 years BCE and 185 CE.

=== List of objects and artifacts ===
- Over 950 fibre sandals, fibre ties
- One leather sandal, fibre ties
- One complete twined fibre apron, leather ties
- Various scraps of textiles, fibre, leather, furs, feathers
- Several caches of mesquite beans in plaited-matting bags
- Over 22,000 maguey ‘quids’
- Two items, classified by Taylor as musical rasps
- “A number of prickly pear pads, split open and with the ‘open edge’ sewn together to make a passable container”
- Several bags of Texas buckeye seeds, and mescal beans, both having narcotic qualities
- 1,195 pieces of twisted cordage
- Various balls of human hair
- Remains of an aged woman, dressed in a loincloth and sandals, wrapped in a mat

All items were found within three strata, with certain items unique to each. For example, while sandals were found in each level, the hair was found only in the earliest stratum. Prepared floors were discovered in the earliest two levels of the cave, which were created by “bringing in earth that was then consolidated by water and probably tamped.” Although thin, they served the function of smoothing the cave floor. Fireplaces seem to have been distributed at random. Although they were found in many other caves in the area, Taylor reports that there were no arrow parts found in Frightful Cave, “whose occupation was probably too early.”

== Anthropological analysis ==
Inside Frightful Cave, comparisons of the different strata allowed for temporal analysis of the cave's inhabitants, while comparisons to other caves in the area allowed for spatial analysis. Spatially, it has been found that there was likely cultural exchange between various nomadic groups both within the Coahuila complex and across nearby regions.

Chronological trends have also been observed, indicating the repeated occupation by culturally similar groups with evolving cultural practices. In particular, changes in the use of the space within the cave suggest a changing way of life. Taylor notes that while the bottom two strata had tamped floors, relatively low levels of bat guano and displayed “a strong tendency to deposit sandals in the farthest recesses of the cave,” in the later stratum no floor had been prepared, there was relatively more bat guano, and sandals were deposited in the center of the cave. These trends are thought to indicate groups’ changing duration of stay, from “more or less constant in the lower levels” to “increasingly intermittent in the upper levels,” since it appears that less effort was put in to keep a clean living space. Changes of this nature would make sense if groups no longer spent such long periods in the cave. This development has been linked to a known increase in aridity in the region which may have resulted in a new distribution of food sources. The argument for changing migration based on new patterns of subsistence is a strong one, as groups in the desert tradition are widely believed to have been nomads who would have settled in various areas as local wild foodstuffs became available. Shafer has theorized that Frightful Cave may have been part of a seasonal round made by these hunter-gatherer groups, which, along with other caves in the area, would have been inhabited from spring through early summer, “when foods such as flowers, bulbs, fruits and plums were available.” Similarly, Taylor posits water accessibility to be the determining factor of such groups’ migratory patterns, meaning shifts thereof may also be accounted for by increasing aridity. Changes in the style and construction of the radiocarbon-dated sandals also suggest a certain cultural discontinuity in the later occupation of Frightful Cave.

There is almost no evidence concerning the religious or artistic cultural lives of Frightful Cave's inhabitants, with the exception being the human hair found deposited at the back of the cave in the first stratum. The hairs appear to have “been cut at regular intervals of about one month” based on their cut ends and lengths. Archival evidence suggests this may have been a mourning practice, but the purpose of such ritual handling of hair has not been concretely determined.
