= American anthropology =

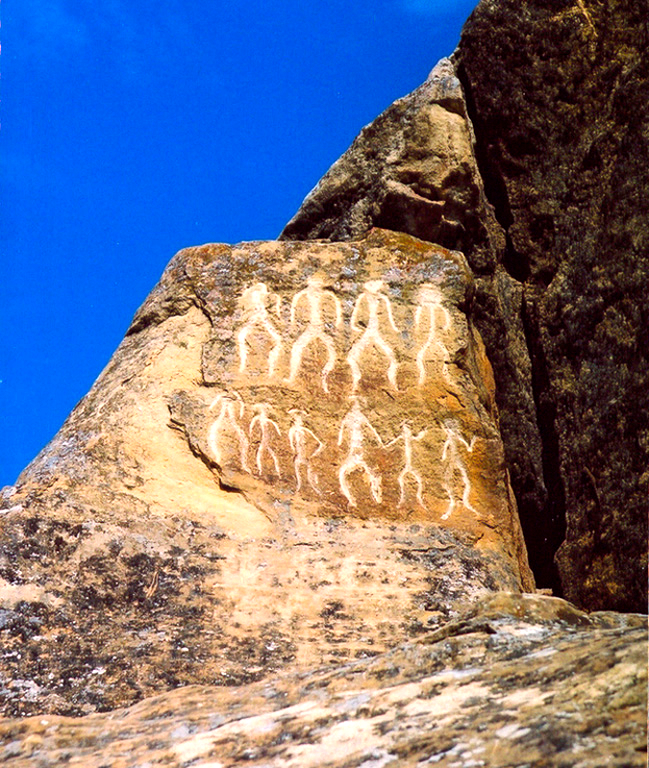
Petroglyphs in modern-day Gobustan, Azerbaijan, dating back to 10 000 BCE and indicating a thriving culture

American anthropology has culture as its central and unifying concept. This most commonly refers to the universal human capacity to classify and encode human experiences symbolically, and to communicate symbolically encoded experiences socially. American anthropology is organized into four fields, each of which plays an important role in research on culture:

1. biological anthropology
2. linguistic anthropology
3. cultural anthropology
4. archaeology

Research in these fields has influenced anthropologists working in other countries to different degrees.

== Biological anthropology ==
Discussion concerning culture among biological anthropologists centers around two debates. First, is culture uniquely human or shared by other species (most notably, other primates)? This is an important question, as the theory of evolution holds that humans are descended from (now extinct) non-human primates. Second, how did culture evolve among human beings?

Gerald Weiss noted that although Tylor's classic definition of culture was restricted to humans, many anthropologists take this for granted and thus elide that important qualification from later definitions, merely equating culture with any learned behavior. This slippage is a problem because during the formative years of modern primatology, some primatologists were trained in anthropology (and understood that culture refers to learned behavior among humans), and others were not. Notable non-anthropologists, like Robert Yerkes and Jane Goodall thus argued that since chimpanzees have learned behaviors, they have culture. Today, anthropological primatologists are divided, several arguing that non-human primates have culture, others arguing that they do not.

This scientific debate is complicated by ethical concerns. The subjects of primatology are non-human primates, and whatever culture these primates have is threatened by human activity. After reviewing the research on primate culture, W. C. McGrew concluded, "[a] discipline requires subjects, and most species of nonhuman primates are endangered by their human cousins. Ultimately, whatever its merit, cultural primatology must be committed to cultural survival [i.e. to the survival of primate cultures]."

McGrew suggests a definition of culture that he finds scientifically useful for studying primate culture. He points out that scientists do not have access to the subjective thoughts or knowledge of non-human primates. Thus, if culture is defined in terms of knowledge, then scientists are severely limited in their attempts to study primate culture. Instead of defining culture as a kind of knowledge, McGrew suggests that we view culture as a process. He lists six steps in the process:

1. A new pattern of behavior is invented, or an existing one is modified.
2. The innovator transmits this pattern to another.
3. The form of the pattern is consistent within and across performers, perhaps even in terms of recognizable stylistic features.
4. The one who acquires the pattern retains the ability to perform it long after having acquired it.
5. The pattern spreads across social units in a population. These social units may be families, clans, troops, or bands.
6. The pattern endures across generations.

McGrew admits that all six criteria may be strict, given the difficulties in observing primate behavior in the wild. But he also insists on the need to be as inclusive as possible, on the need for a definition of culture that "casts the net widely":

Culture is considered to be group-specific behavior that is acquired, at least in part, from social influences. Here, group is considered to be the species-typical unit, whether it be a troop, lineage, subgroup, or so on. Prima facie evidence of culture comes from within-species but across-group variation in behavior, as when a pattern is persistent in one community of chimpanzees but is absent from another, or when different communities perform different versions of the same pattern. The suggestion of culture in action is stronger when the difference across the groups cannot be explained solely by ecological factors ....

—

As Charles Frederick Voegelin pointed out, if "culture" is reduced to "learned behavior," then all animals have culture. Certainly all specialists agree that all primate species evidence common cognitive skills: knowledge of object-permanence, cognitive mapping, the ability to categorize objects, and creative problem solving. Moreover, all primate species show evidence of shared social skills: they recognize members of their social group; they form direct relationships based on degrees of kinship and rank; they recognize third-party social relationships; they predict future behavior; and they cooperate in problem-solving.

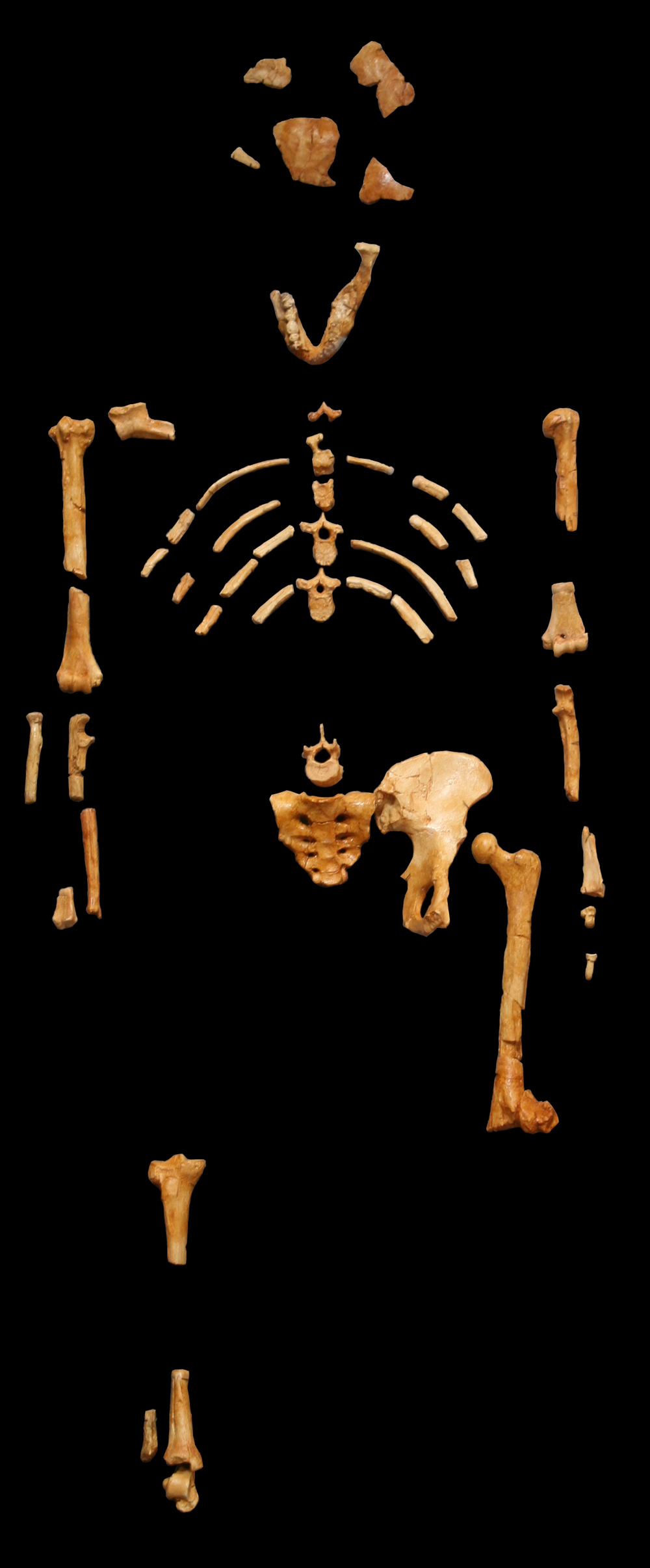
Cast of the skeleton of Lucy, an Australopithecus afarensis

One current view of the temporal and geographical distribution of hominid populations

Nevertheless, the term "culture" applies to non-human animals only if we define culture as any or all learned behavior. Within mainstream physical anthropology, scholars tend to think that a more restrictive definition is necessary. These researchers are concerned with how human beings evolved to be different from other species. A more precise definition of culture, which excludes non-human social behavior, would allow physical anthropologists to study how humans evolved their unique capacity for "culture".

Chimpanzees (Pan troglodytes and Pan paniscus) are humans' (Homo sapiens) closest living relatives; both are descended from a common ancestor which lived around seven million years ago. Human evolution has been rapid with modern humans appearing about 340,000 years ago. During this time humanity evolved three distinctive features:

(a) the creation and use of conventional symbols, including linguistic symbols and their derivatives, such as written language and mathematical symbols and notations; (b) the creation and use of complex tools and other instrumental technologies; and (c) the creation and participation in complex social organization and institutions. According to developmental psychologist Michael Tomasello, "where these complex and species-unique behavioral practices, and the cognitive skills that underlie them, came from" is a fundamental anthropological question. Given that contemporary humans and chimpanzees are far more different from horses and zebras, or rats and mice, and that the evolution of this great difference occurred in such a short period of time, "our search must be for some small difference that made a big difference – some adaptation, or small set of adaptations, that changed the process of primate cognitive evolution in fundamental ways." According to Tomasello, the answer to this question must form the basis of a scientific definition of "human culture."

In a recent review of the major research on human and primate tool-use, communication, and learning strategies, Tomasello argues that the key human advances over primates (language, complex technologies, and complex social organization) are all the results of humans pooling cognitive resources. This is called "the ratchet effect:" innovations spread and are shared by a group, and mastered "by youngsters, which enables them to remain in their new and improved form within the group until something better comes along." The key point is that children are born good at a particular kind of social learning; this creates a favored environment for social innovations, making them more likely to be maintained and transmitted to new generations than individual innovations. For Tomasello, human social learning—the kind of learning that distinguishes humans from other primates and that played a decisive role in human evolution—is based on two elements: first, what he calls "imitative learning," (as opposed to "emulative learning" characteristic of other primates) and second, the fact that humans represent their experiences symbolically (rather than iconically, as is characteristic of other primates). Together, these elements enable humans to be both inventive, and to preserve useful inventions. It is this combination that produces the ratchet effect.

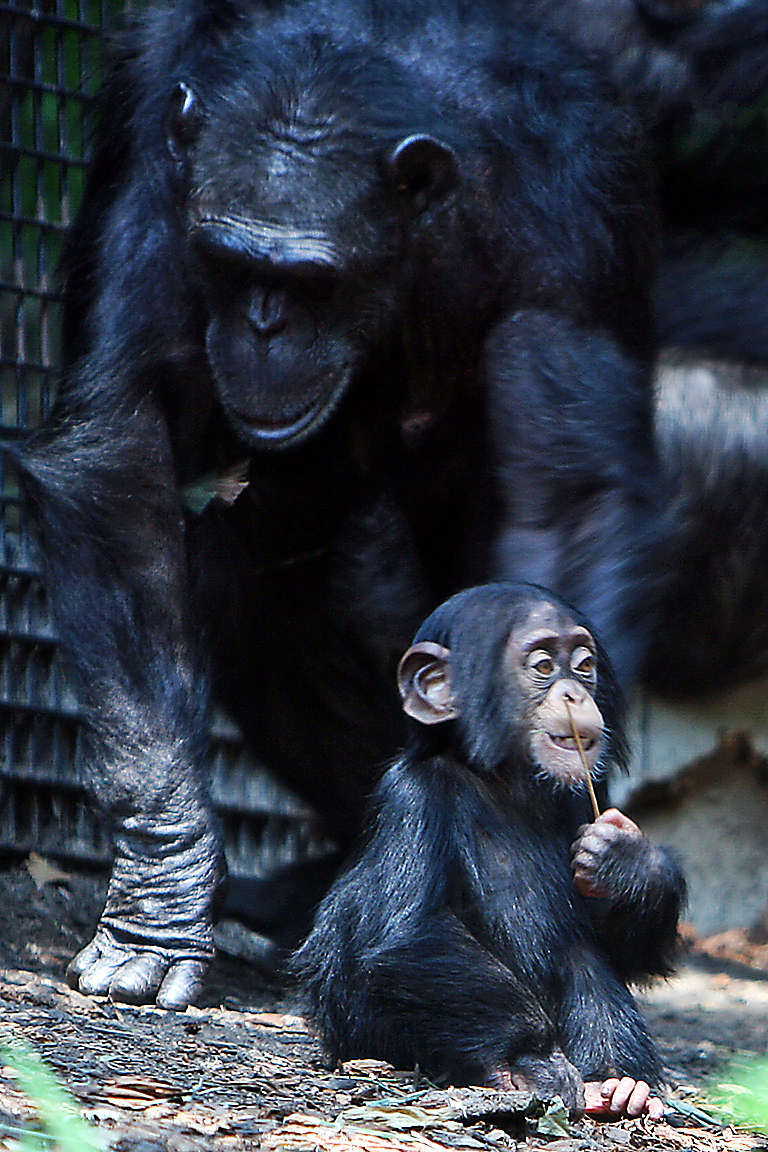
Chimpanzee mother and baby

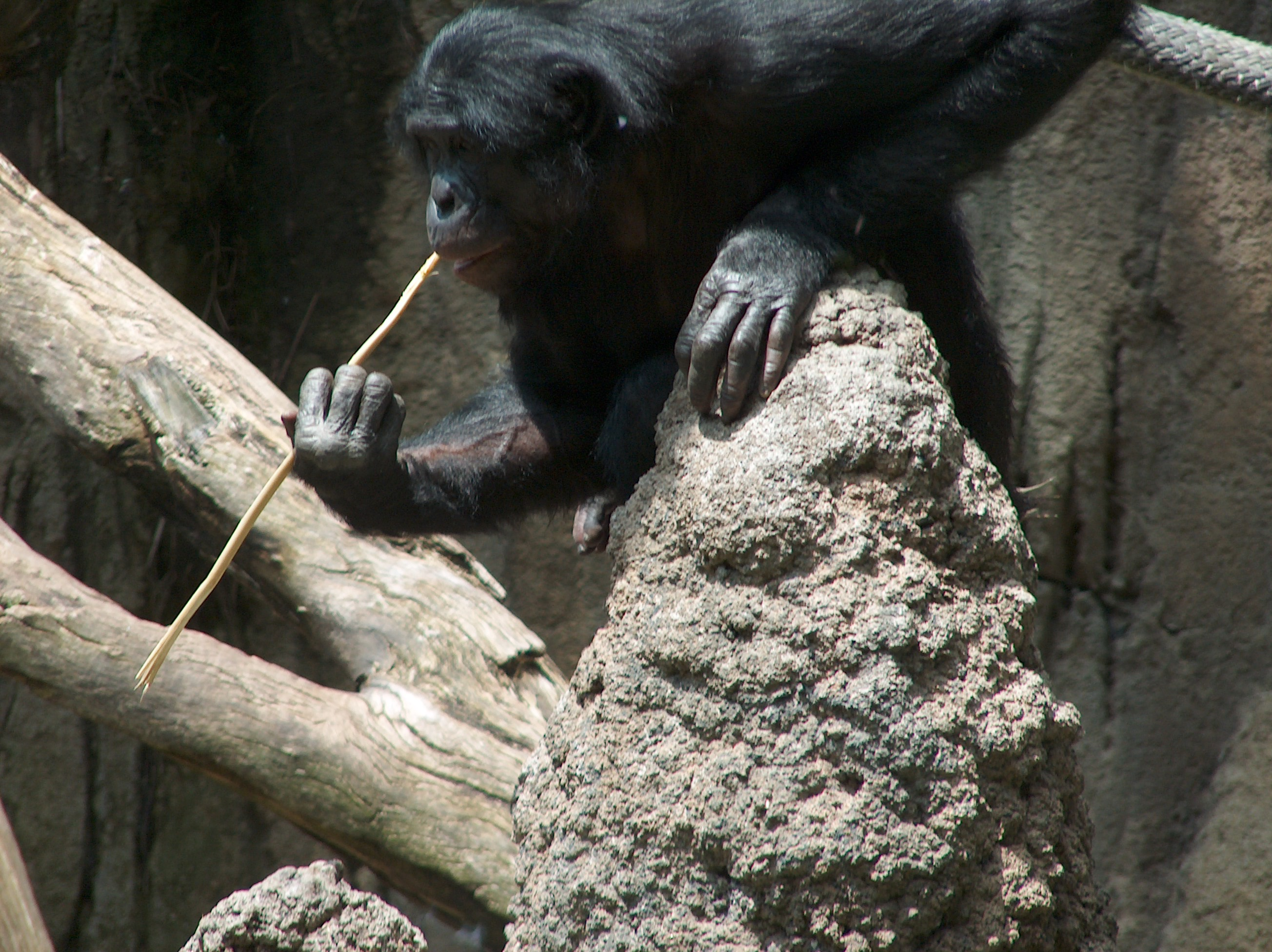
Chimpanzee extracting insects

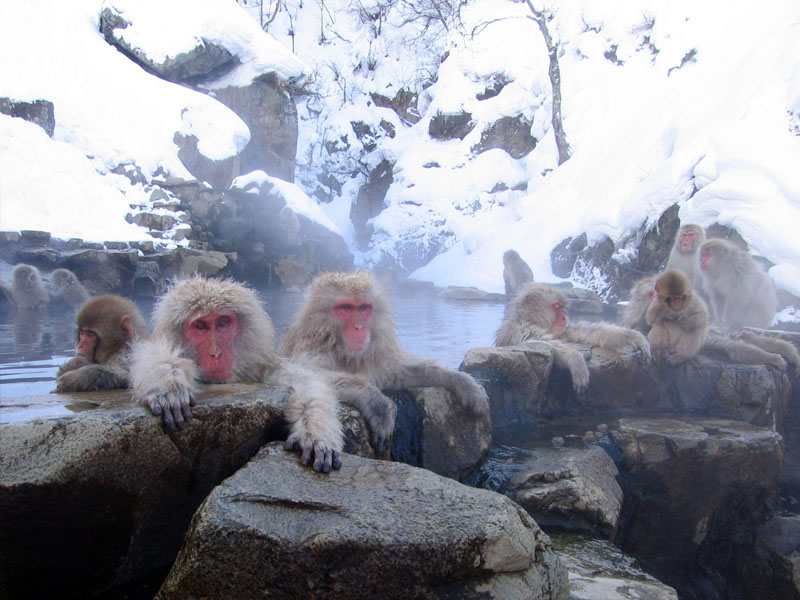
The Japanese Macaques at Jigokudani hot spring in Nagano

The kind of learning found among other primates is "emulation learning," which "focuses on the environmental events involved – results or changes of state in the environment that the other produced – rather than on the actions that produced those results." Tomasello emphasizes that emulation learning is a highly adaptive strategy for apes because it focuses on the effects of an act. In laboratory experiments, chimpanzees were shown two different ways for using a rake-like tool to obtain an out-of-reach-object. Both methods were effective, but one was more efficient than the other. Chimpanzees consistently emulated the more efficient method.

Examples of emulation learning are well documented among primates. Notable examples include Japanese macaque potato washing, chimpanzee tool use, and chimpanzee gestural communication. In 1953, an 18-month-old female macaque monkey was observed taking sandy pieces of sweet potato (given to the monkeys by observers) to a stream (and later, to the ocean) to wash off the sand. After three months, the same behavior was observed in her mother and two playmates, and then the playmates' mothers. Over the next two years seven other young macaques were observed washing their potatoes, and by the end of the third year 40% of the troop had adopted the practice. Although this story is popularly represented as a straightforward example of human-like learning, evidence suggests that it is not. Many monkeys naturally brush sand off food; this behavior had been observed in the macaque troop prior to the first observed washing. Moreover, potato washing was observed in four other separate macaque troops, suggesting that at least four other individual monkeys had learned to wash off sand on their own. Other monkey species in captivity quickly learn to wash off their food. Finally, the spread of learning among the Japanese macaques was fairly slow, and the rate at which new members of the troop learned did not keep pace with the growth of the troop. If the form of learning were imitation, the rate of learning should have been exponential. It is more likely that the monkeys' washing behavior is based on the common behavior of cleaning off food, and that monkeys that spent time by the water independently learned to wash, rather than wipe their food. This explains both why those monkeys that kept company with the original washer, and who thus spent a good deal of time by the water, also figured out how to wash their potatoes. It also explains why the rate at which this behavior spread was slow.

Chimpanzees exhibit a variety of population-specific tool use: termite-fishing, ant-fishing, ant-dipping, nut-cracking, and leaf-sponging. Gombe Chimpanzees fish for termites using small, thin sticks, but chimpanzees in Western Africa use large sticks to break holes in mounds and use their hands to scoop up termites. Some of this variation may be the result of "environmental shaping" (there is more rainfall in western Africa, softening termite mounds and making them easier to break apart, than in the Gombe reserve in eastern Africa). Nevertheless, it is clear that chimpanzees are good at emulation learning. Chimpanzee children independently know how to roll over logs, and know how to eat insects. When children see their mothers rolling over logs to eat the insects beneath, they quickly learn to do the same. In other words, this form of learning builds on activities the children already know.

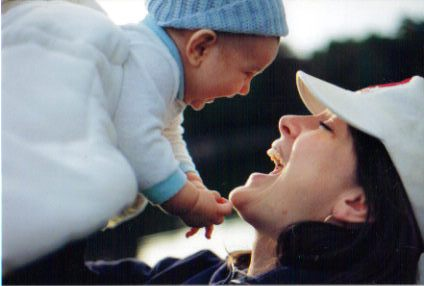
Mother and child

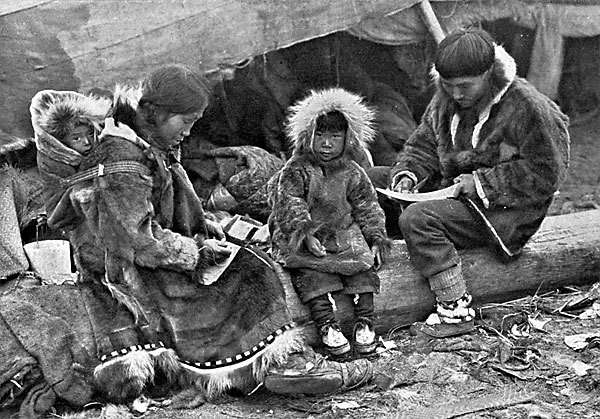
Inuit family

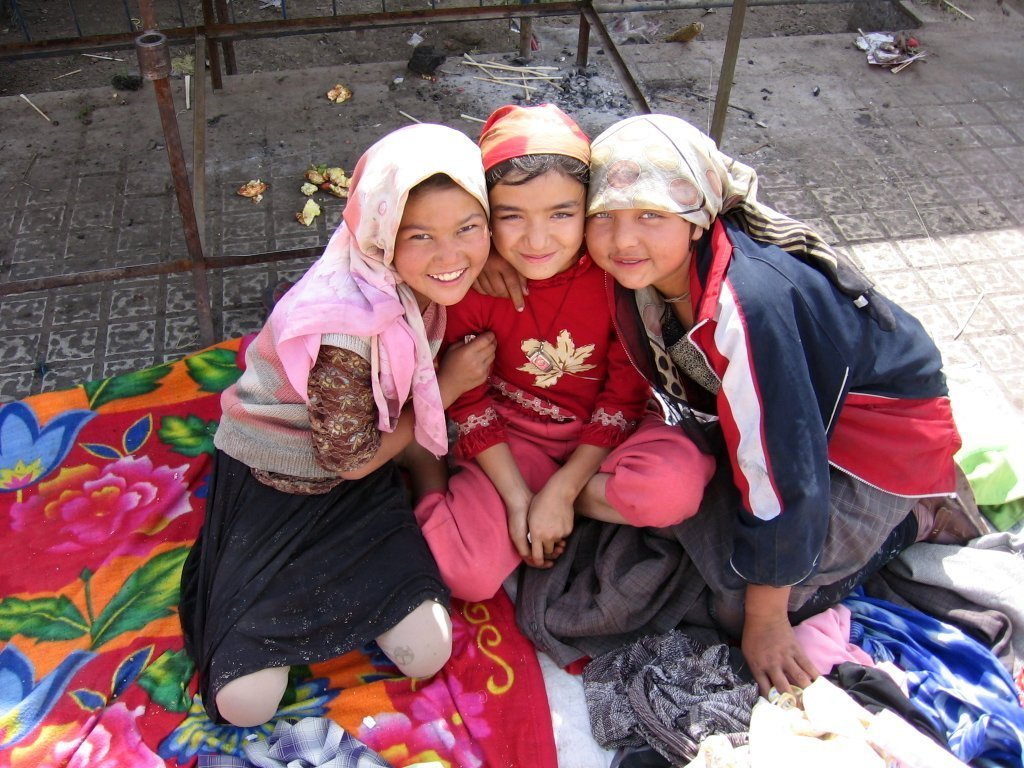
Girls in Xinjiang in northwestern China

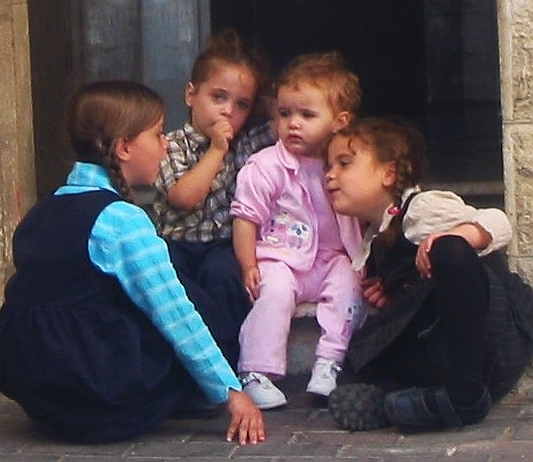
Children in Jerusalem

The kind of learning characteristic of human children is imitative learning, which "means reproducing an instrumental act understood intentionally." Human infants begin to display some evidence of this form of learning between the ages of nine and 12 months, when infants fix their attention not only on an object, but on the gaze of an adult which enables them to use adults as points of reference and thus "act on objects in the way adults are acting on them." This dynamic is well documented and has also been termed "joint engagement" or "joint attention." Essential to this dynamic is the infant's growing capacity to recognize others as "intentional agents:" people "with the power to control their spontaneous behavior" and who "have goals and make active choices among behavioral means for attaining those goals."

The development of skills in joint attention by the end of a human child's first year of life provides the basis for the development of imitative learning in the second year. In one study 14-month-old children imitated an adult's over-complex method of turning on a light, even when they could have used an easier and more natural motion to the same effect. In another study, 16-month-old children interacted with adults who alternated between a complex series of motions that appeared intentional and a comparable set of motions that appeared accidental; they imitated only those motions that appeared intentional. Another study of 18-month old children revealed that children imitate actions that adults intend, yet in some way fail, to perform.

Tomasello emphasizes that this kind of imitative learning "relies fundamentally on infants' tendency to identify with adults, and on their ability to distinguish in the actions of others the underlying goal and the different means that might be used to achieve it." He calls this kind of imitative learning "cultural learning because the child is not just learning about things from other persons, she is also learning things through them — in the sense that she must know something of the adult's perspective on a situation to learn the active use of this same intentional act." He concludes that the key feature of cultural learning is that it occurs only when an individual "understands others as intentional agents, like the self, who have a perspective on the world that can be followed into, directed and shared."

Emulation learning and imitative learning are two different adaptations that can only be assessed in their larger environmental and evolutionary contexts. In one experiment, chimpanzees and two-year-old children were separately presented with a rake-like-tool and an out-of-reach object. Adult humans then demonstrated two different ways to use the tool, one more efficient, one less efficient. Chimpanzees used the same efficient method following both demonstrations, regardless of what was demonstrated. Most of the human children, however, imitated whichever method the adult was demonstrating. If the chimps and humans were to be compared on the basis of these results, one might think that chimpanzees are more intelligent. From an evolutionary perspective they are equally intelligent, but with different kinds of intelligence adapted to different environments. Chimpanzee learning strategies are well-suited to a stable physical environment that requires little social cooperation (compared to humans). Human learning strategies are well-suited to a more complex social environment in which understanding the intentions of others may be more important than success at a specific task. Tomasello argues that this strategy has made possible the "ratchet effect" that enabled humans to evolve complex social systems that have enabled humans to adapt to virtually every physical environment on the surface of the earth.

Tomasello further argues that cultural learning is essential for language-acquisition. Most children in any society, and all children in some, do not learn all words through the direct efforts of adults. "In general, for the vast majority of words in their language, children must find a way to learn in the ongoing flow of social interaction, sometimes from speech not even addressed to them." This finding has been confirmed by a variety of experiments in which children learned words even when the referent was not present, multiple referents were possible, and the adult was not directly trying to teach the word to the child. Tomasello concludes that "a linguistic symbol is nothing other than a marker for an intersubjectively shared understanding of a situation."

Tomasello's 1999 review of the research contrasting human and non-human primate learning strategies confirms biological anthropologist Ralph Holloway's 1969 argument that a specific kind of sociality linked to symbolic cognition were the keys to human evolution, and constitute the nature of culture. According to Holloway, the key issue in the evolution of H. sapiens, and the key to understanding "culture," "is how man organizes his experience." Culture is "the imposition of arbitrary form upon the environment." This fact, Holloway argued, is primary to and explains what is distinctive about human learning strategies, tool-use, and language. Human tool-making and language express "similar, if not identical, cognitive processes" and provide important evidence for how humankind evolved.

In other words, whereas McGrew argues that anthropologists must focus on behaviors like communication and tool-use because they have no access to the mind, Holloway argues that human language and tool-use, including the earliest stone tools in the fossil record 2.6 million years ago, are highly suggestive of cognitive differences between humans and non-humans, and that such cognitive differences in turn explain human evolution. For Holloway, the question is not whether other primates communicate, learn or make tools, but the way they do these things. "Washing potatoes in the ocean ... stripping branches of leaves to get termites," and other examples of primate tool-use and learning "are iconic, and there is no feedback from the environment to the animal." Human tools, however, express an independence from natural form that manifests symbolic thinking. "In the preparation of the stick for termite-eating, the relation between product and raw material is iconic. In the making of a stone tool, in contrast, there is no necessary relation between the form of the final product and the original material."

In Holloway's view, our non-human ancestors, like those of modern chimpanzees and other primates, shared motor and sensory skills, curiosity, memory, and intelligence, with perhaps differences in degree. He adds: "It is when these are integrated with the unique attributes of arbitrary production (symbolization) and imposition that man qua cultural man appears."

He also adds:

I have suggested above that whatever culture may be, it includes "the imposition of arbitrary forms upon the environment." This phrase has two components. One is a recognition that the relationship between the coding process and the phenomenon (be it a tool, social network, or abstract principle) is non-iconic. The other is an idea of man as a creature who can make delusional systems work—who imposes his fantasies, his non-iconic constructs (and constructions), upon the environment. The altered environment shapes his perceptions, and these are again forced back on the environment, are incorporated into the environment, and press for further adaptation.

—

This is comparable to the "ratcheting" aspect suggested by Tomasello and others that enabled human evolution to accelerate. Holloway concludes that the first instance of symbolic thought among humans provided a "kick-start" for brain development, tool complexity, social structure, and language to evolve through a constant dynamic of positive feedback. "This interaction between the propensity to structure the environment arbitrarily and the feedback from the environment to the organism is an emergent process, a process different in kind from anything that preceded it."

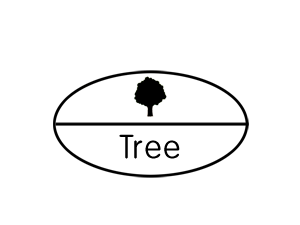
Arbitrariness

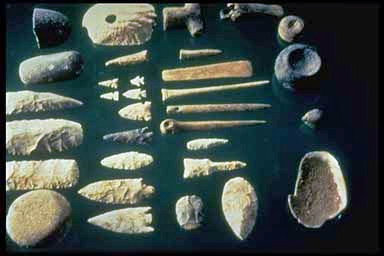
Ancient stone tools

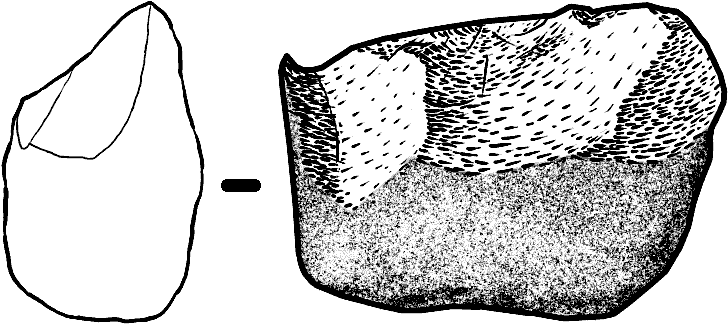
Simple-edge chopper

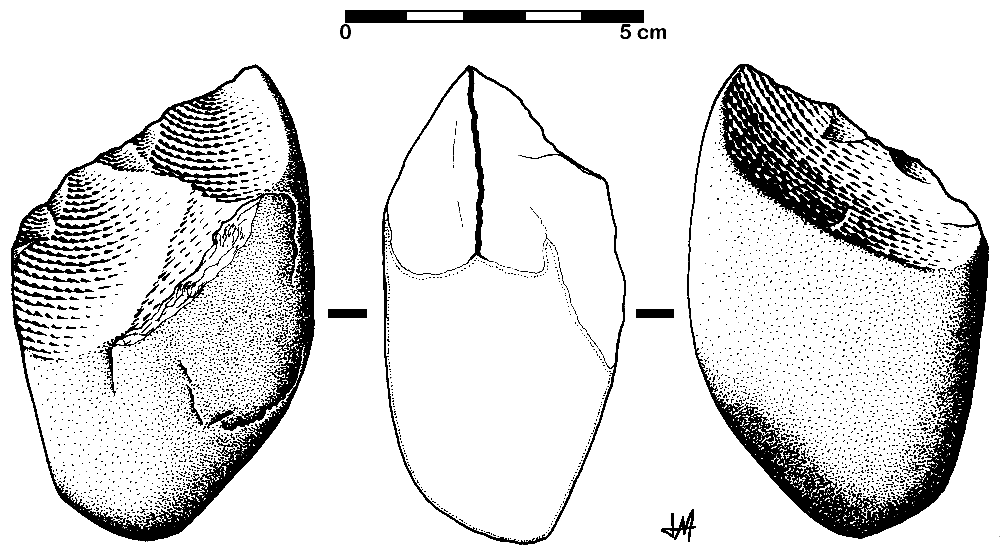
Chopping-tool

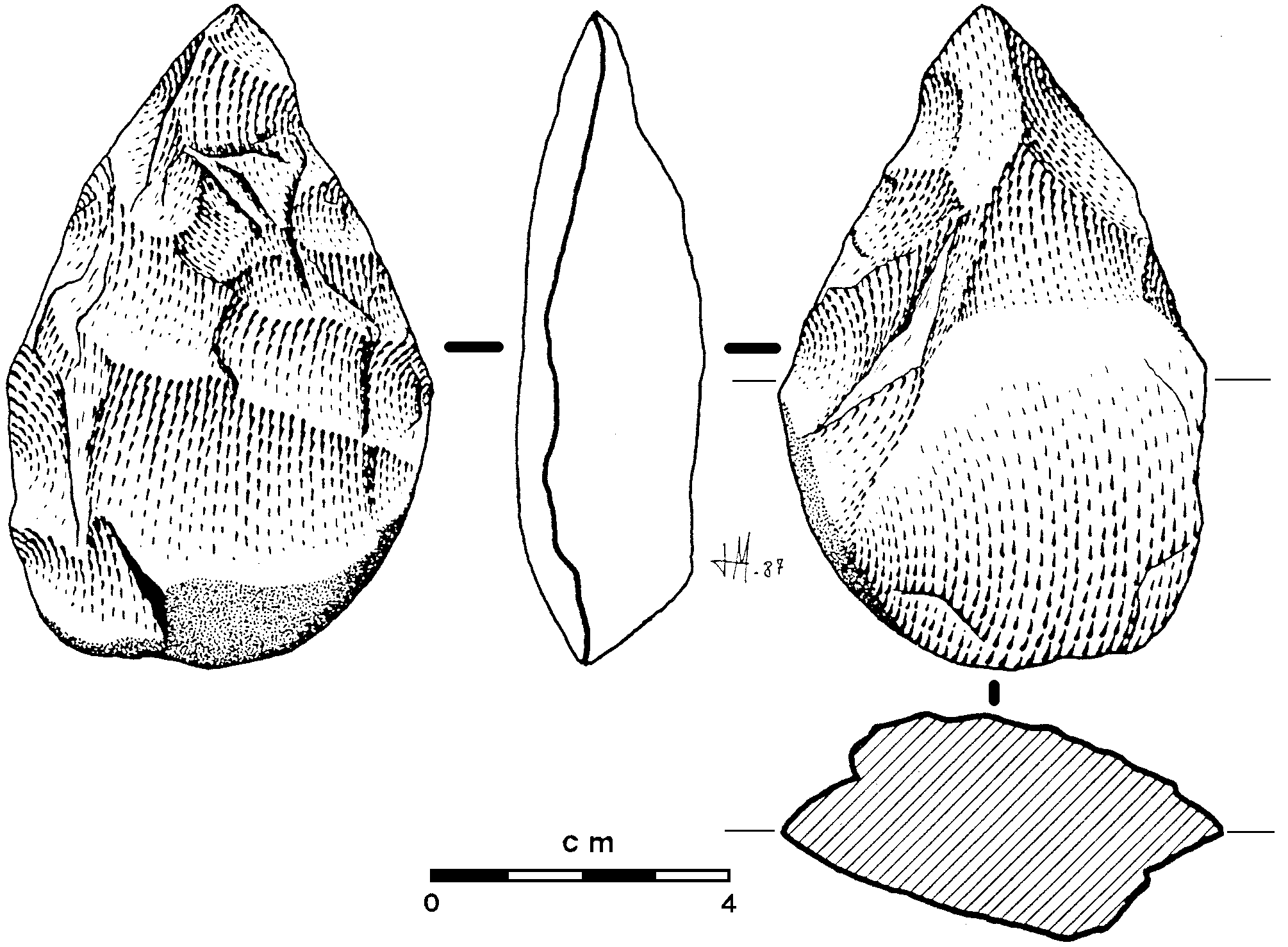
Unretouched biface

Linguists Charles Hockett and R. Ascher have identified thirteen design-features of language, some shared by other forms of animal communication. One feature that distinguishes human language is its tremendous productivity; in other words, competent speakers of a language are capable of producing an exponential number of original utterances. This productivity seems to be made possible by a few critical features unique to human language. One is "duality of patterning," meaning that human language consists of the articulation of several distinct processes, each with its own set of rules: combining phonemes to produce morphemes, combining morphemes to produce words, and combining words to produce sentences. This means that a person can master a relatively limited number of signals and sets of rules, to create infinite combinations. Another crucial element is that human language is symbolic: the sound of words (or their shape, when written) typically bear no relation to what they represent. In other words, their meaning is arbitrary. That words have meaning is a matter of convention. Since the meaning of words are arbitrary, any word may have several meanings, and any object may be referred to using a variety of words; the actual word used to describe a particular object depends on the context, the intention of the speaker, and the ability of the listener to judge these appropriately. As Tomasello notes,

An individual language user looks at a tree and, before drawing the attention of her interlocutor to that tree, must decide, based on her assessment of the listener's current knowledge and expectations, whether to say "that tree over there," "it," "the oak," "that hundred-year-oak," "the tree," "the bagswing tree," "that thing in the front yard," "the ornament," "the embarrassment," or any of a number of other expressions. ... And these decisions are not made on the basis of the speaker's direct goal with respect to the object or activity involved, but rather that they are made on the basis of her goal with respect to the listener's interest and attention to that object or activity. This is why symbolic cognition and communication and imitative learning go hand-in-hand.

—

Holloway argues that the stone tools associated with genus Homo have the same features of human language:

Returning to matter of syntax, rules, and concatenated activity mentioned above, almost any model which describes a language process can also be used to describe tool-making. This is hardly surprising. Both activities are concatenated, both have rigid rules about the serialization of unit activities (the grammar, syntax), both are hierarchical systems of activity (as is any motor activity), and both produce arbitrary configurations which thence become part of the environment, either temporarily or permanently.

—

He also adds:

Productivity can be seen in the facts that basic types were probably used for multiple purposes, that tool industries tend to expand with time, and that a slight variation on a basic pattern may be made to meet some new functional requisite. Elements of a basic "vocabulary" of motor operations—flakes, detachment, rotation, preparation of striking platform, etc.—are used in different combinations to produce dissimilar tools, with different forms, and supposedly, different uses... . Taking each motor event alone, no one action is complete; each action depends on the prior one and requires a further one, and each is dependent on another ax on the original plan. In other words, at each point of the action except the last, the piece is not "satisfactory" in structure. Each unit action is meaningless by itself in the sense of the use of the tool; it is meaningful only in the context of the whole completed set of actions culminating in the final product. This exactly parallels language.

—

As Tomasello demonstrates, symbolic thought can operate only in a particular social environment:

Arbitrary symbols enforce consensus of perceptions, which not only allows members to communicate about the same objects in terms of space and time (as in hunting) but it also makes it possible for social relationships to be standardized and manipulated through symbols. It means that idiosyncrasies are smoothed out and perceived within classes of behavior. By enforcing perceptual invariance, symbols also enforce social behavioral constancy, and enforcing social behavioral constancy is a prerequisite to differential task-role sectors in a differentiated social group adapting not only to the outside environment but to its own membership.

—

Biological anthropologist Terrence Deacon, in a synthesis of over twenty years of research on human evolution, human neurology, and primatology, describes this "ratcheting effect" as a form of "Baldwinian Evolution." Named after psychologist James Baldwin, this describes a situation in which an animal's behavior has evolutionary consequences when it changes the natural environment and thus the selective forces acting on the animal.

Once some useful behavior spreads within a population and becomes more important for subsistence, it will generate selection pressures on genetic traits that support its propagation ... Stone and symbolic tools, which were initially acquired with the aid of flexible ape-learning abilities, ultimately turned the tables on their users and forced them to adapt to a new niche opened by these technologies. Rather than being just useful tricks, these behavioral prostheses for obtaining food and organizing social behaviors became indispensable elements in a new adaptive complex. The origin of "humanness" can be defined as that point in our evolution where these tools became the principle [sic?] source of selection on our bodies and brains. It is the diagnostic of Homo symbolicus.

—

According to Deacon, this occurred between 2 and 2.5 million years ago, when we have the first fossil evidence of stone tool use and the beginning of a trend in an increase in brain size. But it is the evolution of symbolic language which is the cause—and not the effect—of these trends. More specifically, Deacon is suggesting that Australopithecines, like contemporary apes, used tools; it is possible that over the millions of years of Australopithecine history, many troops developed symbolic communication systems. All that was necessary was that one of these groups so altered their environment that "it introduced selection for very different learning abilities than affected prior species." This troop or population kick-started the Baldwinian process (the "ratchet effect") that led to their evolution to genus Homo.

The question for Deacon is what behavioral-environmental changes could have made the development of symbolic thinking adaptive? Here he emphasizes the importance of distinguishing humans from all other species, not to privilege human intelligence but to problematize it. Given that the evolution of H. sapiens began with ancestors who did not yet have "culture," what led them to move away from cognitive, learning, communication, and tool-making strategies that were and continued to be adaptive for most other primates (and, some have suggested, most other species of animals)? Learning symbol systems is more time-consuming than other forms of communication, so symbolic thought made possible a different communication strategy, but not a more efficient one than other primates. Nevertheless, it must have offered some selective advantage to H. sapiens to have evolved. Deacon starts by looking at two key determinants in evolutionary history: foraging behavior, and patterns of sexual relations. As he observes competition for sexual access limits the possibilities for social cooperation in many species; yet, Deacon observes, there are three consistent patterns in human reproduction that distinguish them from other species:

1. Both males and females usually contribute effort towards the rearing of their offspring, though often to differing extents and in very different ways.
2. In all societies, the great majority of adult males and females are bound by long-term, exclusive sexual access rights and prohibitions to particular individuals of the opposite sex.
3. They maintain these exclusive sexual relations while living in modest to large-sized, multi-male, multi-female, cooperative social groups.

Moreover, there is one feature common to all known human foraging societies (all humans prior to ten or fifteen thousand years ago), and markedly different from other primates: "the use of meat... . The appearance of the first stone tools nearly 2.5 million years ago almost certainly correlates with a radical shift in foraging behavior to gain access to meat." Deacon does not believe that symbolic thought was necessary for hunting or tool-making (although tool-making may be a reliable index of symbolic thought); rather, it was necessary for the success of distinctive social relations.

The key is that while men and women are equally effective foragers, mothers carrying dependent children are not effective hunters. They must thus depend on male hunters. This favors a system in which males have exclusive sexual access to females, and females can predict that their sexual partner will provide food for them and their children. In most mammalian species the result is a system of rank or sexual competition that results in either polygyny, or lifelong pair-bonding between two individuals who live relatively independent of other adults of their species; in both cases male aggression plays an important role in maintaining sexual access to mate(s).

Human reliance on resources that are relatively unavailable to females with infants selects not only for cooperation between a child's father and mother but also for the cooperation of other relatives and friends, including elderly individuals and juveniles, who can be relied upon for assistance. The special demands of acquiring meat and caring for infants in our own evolution together contribute to the underlying impetus for the third characteristic feature of human reproductive patterns: cooperative group living.

—

What is uniquely characteristic about human societies is what required symbolic cognition, which consequently leads to the evolution of culture: "cooperative, mixed-sex social groups, with significant male care and provisioning of offspring, and relatively stable patterns of reproductive exclusion." This combination is relatively rare in other species because it is "highly susceptible to disintegration." Language and culture provide the glue that holds it together.

Chimpanzees also, on occasion, hunt meat; in most cases, however, males consume the meat immediately, and only on occasion share with females who happen to be nearby. Among chimpanzees, hunting for meat increases when other sources of food become scarce, but under these conditions sharing decreases. The first forms of symbolic thinking made stone tools possible, which in turn made hunting for meat a more dependable source of food for our nonhuman ancestors while making possible forms of social communication that make sharing between males and females, but also among males, decreasing sexual competition:

So the socio-ecological problem posed by the transition to a meat-supplemented subsistence strategy is that it cannot be utilized without a social structure which guarantees unambiguous and exclusive mating and is sufficiently egalitarian to sustain cooperation via shared or parallel reproductive interests. This problem can be solved symbolically.

—

Symbols and symbolic thinking thus make possible a central feature of social relations in every human population: reciprocity. Evolutionary scientists have developed a model to explain reciprocal altruism among closely related individuals. Symbolic thought makes possible reciprocity between distantly related individuals.

== Archaeology ==
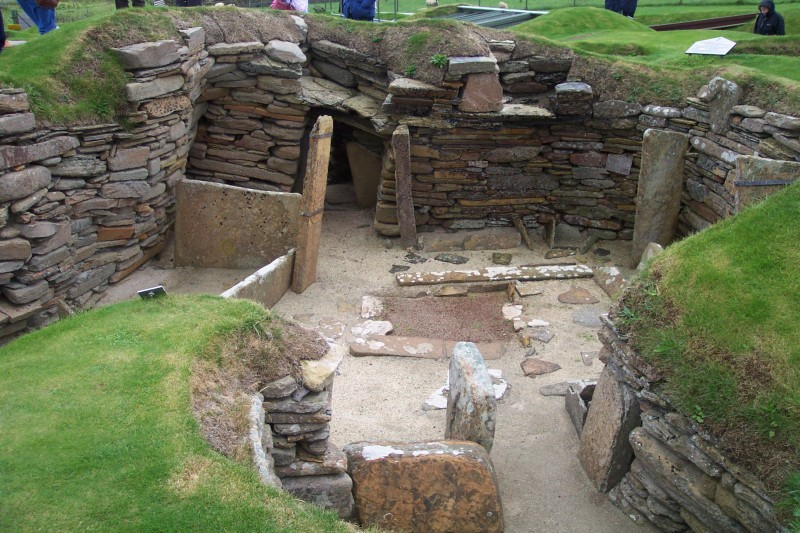
Excavated dwellings at Skara Brae, Europe's most complete Neolithic village

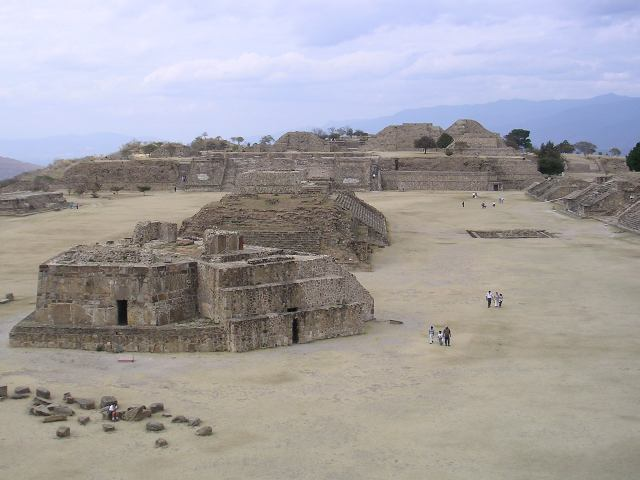
Monte Albán archaeological site

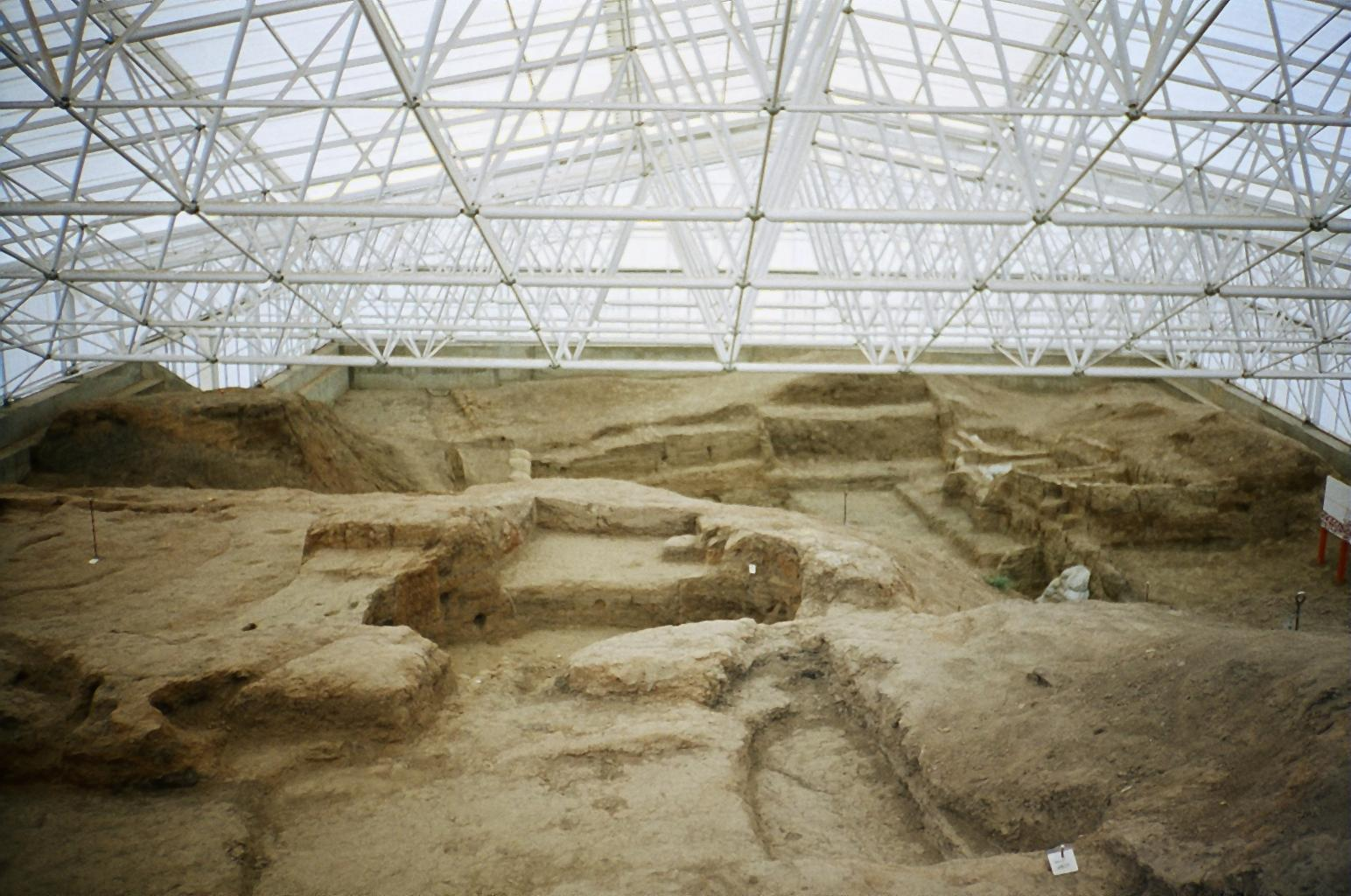
Excavations at the South Area of Çatalhöyük

In the 19th century archaeology was often a supplement to history, and the goal of archaeologists was to identify artifacts according to their typology and stratigraphy, thus marking their location in time and space. Franz Boas established that archaeology be one of American anthropology's four fields, and debates among archaeologists have often paralleled debates among cultural anthropologists. In the 1920s and 1930s, Australian-British archaeologist V. Gordon Childe and American archaeologist W. C. McKern independently began moving from asking about the date of an artifact, to asking about the people who produced it – when archaeologists work alongside historians, historical materials generally help answer these questions, but when historical materials are unavailable, archaeologists had to develop new methods. Childe and McKern focused on analyzing the relationships among objects found together; their work established the foundation for a three-tiered model:

1. An individual artifact, which has surface, shape, and technological attributes (e.g. an arrowhead)
2. A sub-assemblage, consisting of artifacts that are found, and were likely used, together (e.g. an arrowhead, bow and knife)
3. An assemblage of sub-assemblages that together constitute the archaeological site (e.g. the arrowhead, bow and knife; a pot and the remains of a hearth; a shelter)

Childe argued that a "constantly recurring assemblage of artifacts" is an "archaeological culture." Childe and others viewed "each archaeological culture ... the manifestation in material terms of a specific people."

In 1948, Walter Taylor systematized the methods and concepts that archaeologists had developed and proposed a general model for the archaeological contribution to knowledge of cultures. He began with the mainstream understanding of culture as the product of human cognitive activity, and the Boasian emphasis on the subjective meanings of objects as dependent on their cultural context. He defined culture as "a mental phenomenon, consisting of the contents of minds, not of material objects or observable behavior." He then devised a three-tiered model linking cultural anthropology to archeology, which he called conjunctive archaeology:

1. Culture, which is unobservable (behavior) and nonmaterial
2. Behaviors resulting from culture, which are observable and nonmaterial
3. Objectifications, such as artifacts and architecture, which are the result of behavior and material

That is, material artifacts were the material residue of culture, but not culture itself. Taylor's point was that the archaeological record could contribute to anthropological knowledge, but only if archaeologists reconceived their work not just as digging up artifacts and recording their location in time and space, but as inferring from material remains the behaviors through which they were produced and used, and inferring from these behaviors the mental activities of people. Although many archaeologists agreed that their research was integral to anthropology, Taylor's program was never fully implemented. One reason was that his three-tier model of inferences required too much fieldwork and laboratory analysis to be practical. Moreover, his view that material remains were not themselves cultural, and in fact twice-removed from culture, in fact left archaeology marginal to cultural anthropology.

In 1962, Leslie White's former student Lewis Binford proposed a new model for anthropological archaeology, called "the New Archaeology" or "Processual Archaeology," based on White's definition of culture as "the extra-somatic means of adaptation for the human organism." This definition allowed Binford to establish archaeology as a crucial field for the pursuit of the methodology of Julian Steward's cultural ecology:

The comparative study of cultural systems with variable technologies in a similar environmental range or similar technologies in differing environments is a major methodology of what Steward (1955: 36–42) has called "cultural ecology," and certainly is a valuable means of increasing our understanding of cultural processes. Such a methodology is also useful in elucidating the structural relationships between major cultural sub-systems such as the social and ideological sub-systems.

—

In other words, Binford proposed an archaeology that would be central to the dominant project of cultural anthropologists at the time (culture as non-genetic adaptations to the environment); the "new archaeology" was the cultural anthropology (in the form of cultural ecology or ecological anthropology) of the past.

In the 1980s, there was a movement in the United Kingdom and Europe against the view of archeology as a field of anthropology, echoing Radcliffe-Brown's earlier rejection of cultural anthropology. During this same period, then-Cambridge archaeologist Ian Hodder developed "post-processual archaeology" as an alternative. Like Binford (and unlike Taylor) Hodder views artifacts not as objectifications of culture but as culture itself. Unlike Binford, however, Hodder does not view culture as an environmental adaptation. Instead, he "is committed to a fluid semiotic version of the traditional culture concept in which material items, artifacts, are full participants in the creation, deployment, alteration, and fading away of symbolic complexes." His 1982 book, Symbols in Action, evokes the symbolic anthropology of Geertz, Schneider, with their focus on the context dependent meanings of cultural things, as an alternative to White and Steward's materialist view of culture. In his 1991 textbook, Reading the Past: Current Approaches to Interpretation in Archaeology Hodder argued that archaeology is more closely aligned to history than to anthropology.

== Linguistic anthropology ==
The connection between culture and language has been noted as far back as the classical period and probably long before. The ancient Greeks, for example, distinguished between civilized peoples and bárbaroi "those who babble", i.e. those who speak unintelligible languages. The fact that different groups speak different, unintelligible languages is often considered more tangible evidence for cultural differences than other less obvious cultural traits.

The German romanticists of the 19th century such as Johann Gottfried Herder and Wilhelm von Humboldt, often saw language not just as one cultural trait among many but rather as the direct expression of a people's national character, and as such as culture in a kind of condensed form. Herder for example suggests, "Denn jedes Volk ist Volk; es hat seine National Bildung wie seine Sprache" (Since every people is a People, it has its own national culture expressed through its own language).

Franz Boas, founder of American anthropology, like his German forerunners, maintained that the shared language of a community is the most essential carrier of their common culture. Boas was the first anthropologist who considered it unimaginable to study the culture of a foreign people without also becoming acquainted with their language. For Boas, the fact that the intellectual culture of a people was largely constructed, shared and maintained through the use of language, meant that understanding the language of a cultural group was the key to understanding its culture. At the same time, though, Boas and his students were aware that culture and language are not directly dependent on one another. That is, groups with widely different cultures may share a common language, and speakers of completely unrelated languages may share the same fundamental cultural traits. Numerous other scholars have suggested that the form of language determines specific cultural traits. This is similar to the notion of linguistic determinism, which states that the form of language determines individual thought. While Boas himself rejected a causal link between language and culture, some of his intellectual heirs entertained the idea that habitual patterns of speaking and thinking in a particular language may influence the culture of the linguistic group. Such belief is related to the theory of linguistic relativity. Boas, like most modern anthropologists, however, was more inclined to relate the interconnectedness between language and culture to the fact that, as B.L. Whorf put it, "they have grown up together".

Indeed, the origin of language, understood as the human capacity of complex symbolic communication, and the origin of complex culture is often thought to stem from the same evolutionary process in early man. Evolutionary anthropologist Robin I. Dunbar has proposed that language evolved as early humans began to live in large communities which required the use of complex communication to maintain social coherence. Language and culture then both emerged as a means of using symbols to construct social identity and maintain coherence within a social group too large to rely exclusively on pre-human ways of building community such as for example grooming. Since language and culture are both in essence symbolic systems, twentieth century cultural theorists have applied the methods of analyzing language developed in the science of linguistics to also analyze culture. Particularly the structural theory of Ferdinand de Saussure which describes symbolic systems as consisting of signs (a pairing of a particular form with a particular meaning) has come to be applied widely in the study of culture. But also post-structuralist theories that nonetheless still rely on the parallel between language and culture as systems of symbolic communication, have been applied in the field of semiotics. The parallel between language and culture can then be understood as analog to the parallel between a linguistic sign, consisting for example of the sound [kau] and the meaning "cow", and a cultural sign, consisting for example of the cultural form of "wearing a crown" and the cultural meaning of "being king". In this way it can be argued that culture is itself a kind of language. Another parallel between cultural and linguistic systems is that they are both systems of practice, that is, they are a set of special ways of doing things that is constructed and perpetuated through social interactions. Children, for example, acquire language in the same way as they acquire the basic cultural norms of the society they grow up in – through interaction with older members of their cultural group.

However, languages, now understood as the particular set of speech norms of a particular community, are also a part of the larger culture of the community that speak them. Humans use language as a way of signalling identity with one cultural group and difference from others. Even among speakers of one language several different ways of using the language exist, and each is used to signal affiliation with particular subgroups within a larger culture. In linguistics such different ways of using the same language are called "varieties". For example, the English language is spoken differently in the US, the UK and Australia, and even within English-speaking countries there are hundreds of dialects of English that each signals a belonging to a particular region and/or subculture. For example, in the UK the cockney dialect signals its speakers' belonging to the group of lower class workers of east London. Differences between varieties of the same language often consist in different pronunciations and vocabulary, but also sometimes of different grammatical systems and very often in using different styles (e.g. cockney rhyming slang or lawyers' jargon). Linguists and anthropologists, particularly sociolinguists, ethnolinguists and linguistic anthropologists have specialized in studying how ways of speaking vary between speech communities.

A community's ways of speaking or signing are a part of the community's culture, just as other shared practices are. Language use is a way of establishing and displaying group identity. Ways of speaking function not only to facilitate communication, but also to identify the social position of the speaker. Linguists call different ways of speaking language varieties, a term that encompasses geographically or socioculturally defined dialects as well as the jargons or styles of subcultures. Linguistic anthropologists and sociologists of language define communicative style as the ways that language is used and understood within a particular culture.

The difference between languages does not consist only in differences in pronunciation, vocabulary or grammar, but also in different "cultures of speaking". Some cultures for example have elaborate systems of "social deixis", systems of signalling social distance through linguistic means. In English, social deixis is shown mostly though distinguishing between addressing some people by first name and others by surname, but also in titles such as "Mrs.", "boy", "Doctor" or "Your Honor", but in other languages such systems may be highly complex and codified in the entire grammar and vocabulary of the language. In several languages of east Asia, for example Thai, Burmese and Javanese, different words are used according to whether a speaker is addressing someone of higher or lower rank than oneself in a ranking system with animals and children ranking the lowest and gods and members of royalty as the highest. Other languages may use different forms of address when speaking to speakers of the opposite gender or in-law relatives and many languages have special ways of speaking to infants and children. Among other groups, the culture of speaking may entail not speaking to particular people, for example many indigenous cultures of Australia have a taboo against talking to one's in-law relatives, and in some cultures speech is not addressed directly to children. Some languages also require different ways of speaking for different social classes of speakers, and often such a system is based on gender differences, as in Japanese and Koasati.

== Cultural anthropology ==
=== Universal versus particular ===
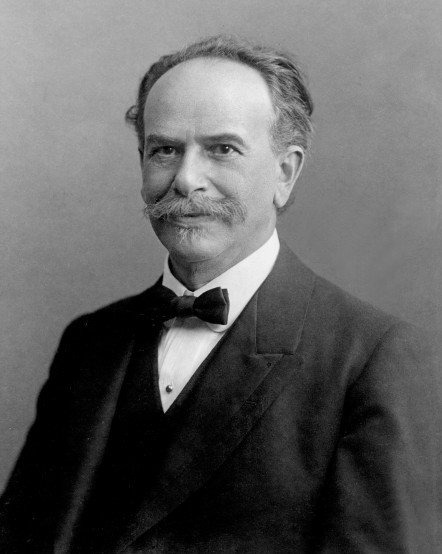
Franz Boas established modern American anthropology as the study of the sum total of human phenomena. c. 1915

The modern anthropological concept of culture has its origins in the 19th century with German anthropologist Adolf Bastian's theory of the "psychic unity of mankind," which, influenced by Herder and von Humboldt, challenged the identification of "culture" with the way of life of European elites, and British anthropologist Edward Burnett Tylor's attempt to define culture as inclusively as possible. Tylor in 1874 described culture in the following way: "Culture or civilization, taken in its wide ethnographic sense, is that complex whole which includes knowledge, belief, art, morals, law, custom, and any other capabilities and habits acquired by man as a member of society." Although Tylor was not aiming to propose a general theory of culture (he explained his understanding of culture in the course of a larger argument about the nature of religion), American anthropologists have generally presented their various definitions of culture as refinements of Tylor's. Franz Boas's student Alfred Kroeber (1876–1970) identified culture with the "superorganic," that is, a domain with ordering principles and laws that could not be explained by or reduced to biology. In 1973, Gerald Weiss reviewed various definitions of culture and debates as to their parsimony and power, and proposed as the most scientifically useful definition that "culture" be defined "as our generic term for all human nongenetic, or metabiological, phenomena" (italics in the original).

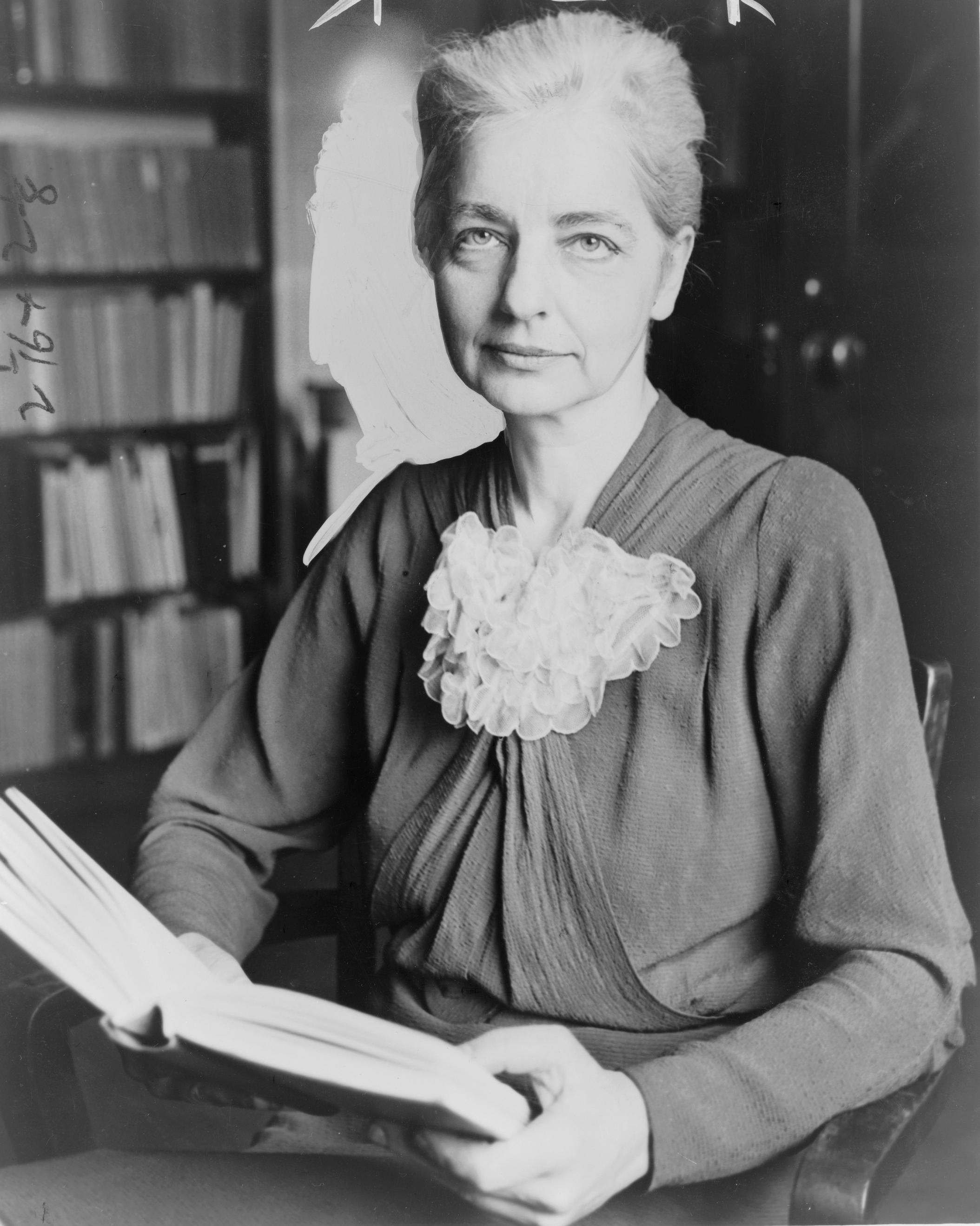
Ruth Benedict was instrumental in establishing the modern conception of distinct cultures being patterned. 1937

Franz Boas founded modern American anthropology with the establishment of the first graduate program in anthropology at Columbia University in 1896. At the time the dominant model of culture was that of cultural evolution, which posited that human societies progressed through stages of savagery to barbarism to civilization; thus, societies that for example are based on horticulture and Iroquois kinship terminology are less evolved than societies based on agriculture and Eskimo kinship terminology. One of Boas's greatest accomplishments was to demonstrate convincingly that this model is fundamentally flawed, empirically, methodologically, and theoretically. Moreover, he felt that our knowledge of different cultures was so incomplete, and often based on unsystematic or unscientific research, that it was impossible to develop any scientifically valid general model of human cultures. Instead, he established the principle of cultural relativism and trained students to conduct rigorous participant observation field research in different societies. Boas understood the capacity for culture to involve symbolic thought and social learning, and considered the evolution of a capacity for culture to coincide with the evolution of other, biological, features defining genus Homo. Nevertheless, he argued that culture could not be reduced to biology or other expressions of symbolic thought, such as language. Boas and his students understood culture inclusively and resisted developing a general definition of culture. Indeed, they resisted identifying "culture" as a thing, instead using culture as an adjective rather than a noun. Boas argued that cultural "types" or "forms" are always in a state of flux. His student Alfred Kroeber argued that the "unlimited receptivity and assimilativeness of culture" made it practically impossible to think of cultures as discrete things.

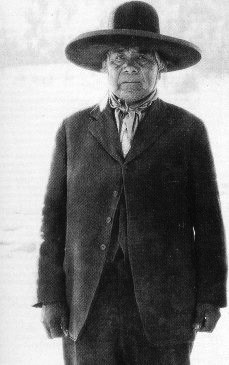
Wovoka, Paiute spiritual leader and creator of the Ghost Dance, c. 1920

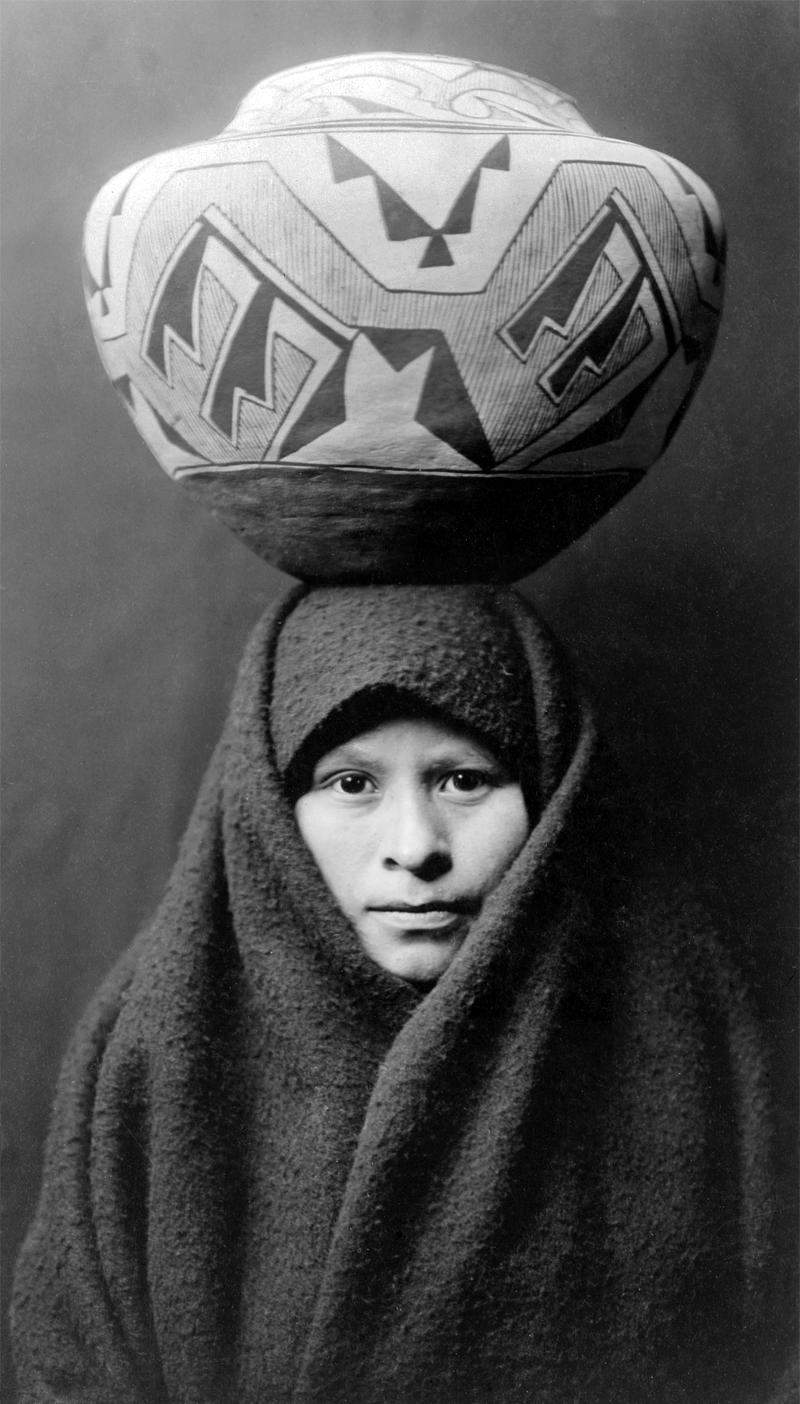
Zuñi girl with jar, 1903

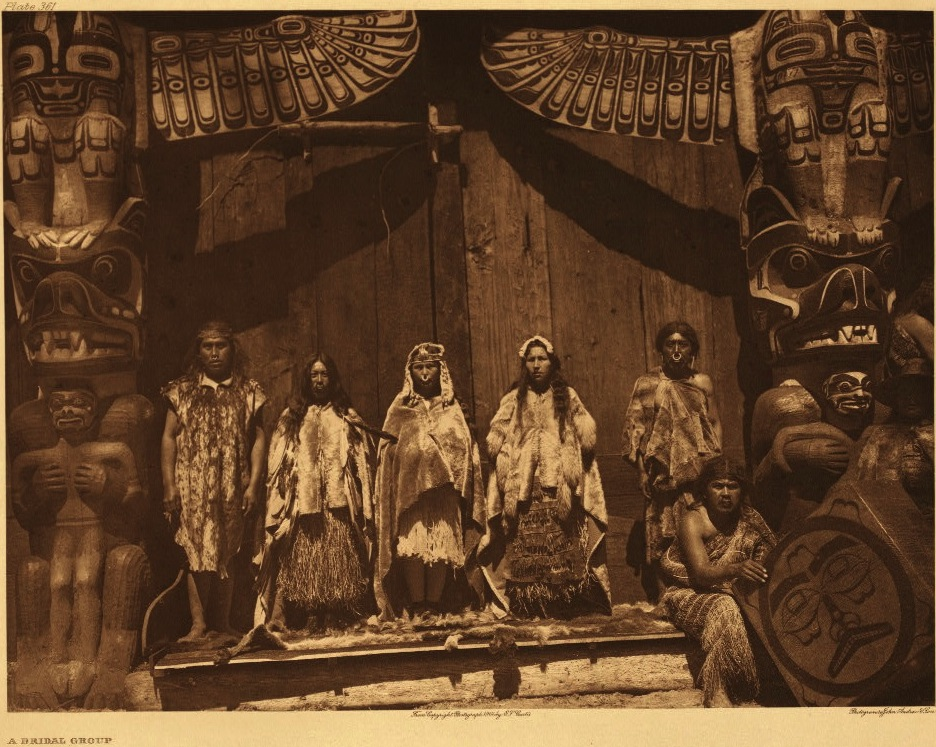
Edward Curtis photo of a Kwakwaka'wakw potlatch, 1914

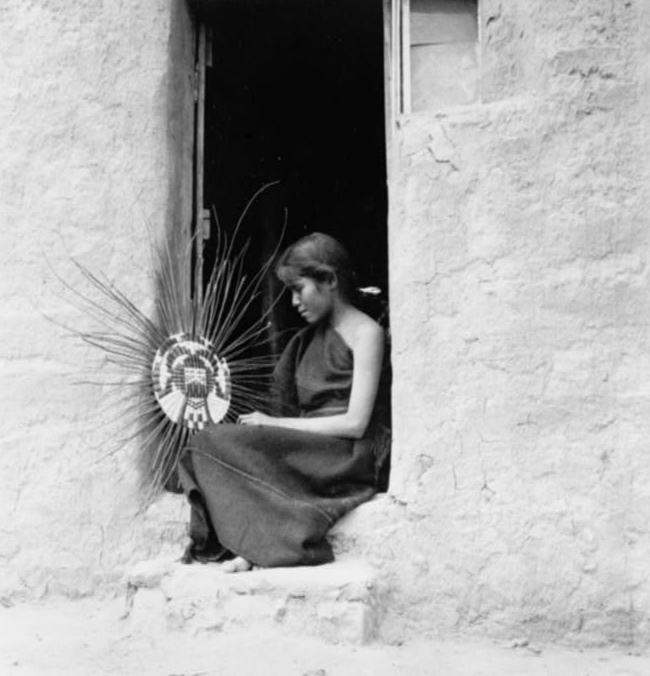
Hopi Basket Weaver, c. 1900

Boas's students dominated cultural anthropology through World War II, and continued to have great influence through the 1960s. They were especially interested in two phenomena: the great variety of forms culture took around the world, and the many ways individuals were shaped by and acted creatively through their own cultures. This led his students to focus on the history of cultural traits: how they spread from one society to another, and how their meanings changed over time—and the life histories of members of other societies. Others, such as Ruth Benedict (1887–1948) and Margaret Mead (1901–1978), produced monographs or comparative studies analyzing the forms of creativity possible to individuals within specific cultural configurations. Essential to their research was the concept of "context": culture provided a context that made the behavior of individuals understandable; geography and history provided a context for understanding the differences between cultures. Thus, although Boasians were committed to the belief in the psychic unity of humankind and the universality of culture, their emphasis on local context and cultural diversity led them away from proposing cultural universals or universal theories of culture.

There is a tension in cultural anthropology between the claim that culture is a universal (the fact that all human societies have culture), and that it is also particular (culture takes a tremendous variety of forms around the world). Since Boas, two debates have dominated cultural anthropology. The first has to do with ways of modeling particular cultures. Specifically, anthropologists have argued as to whether "culture" can be thought of as a bounded and integrated thing, or as a quality of a diverse collection of things, the numbers and meanings of which are in constant flux. Boas's student Ruth Benedict suggested that in any given society cultural traits may be more or less "integrated," that is, constituting a pattern of action and thought that gives purpose to people's lives, and provides them with a basis from which to evaluate new actions and thoughts, although she implies that there are various degrees of integration; indeed, she observes that some cultures fail to integrate. Boas, however, argued that complete integration is rare and that a given culture only appears to be integrated because of observer bias. For Boas, the appearance of such patterns—a national culture, for example—was the effect of a particular point of view.

The first debate was effectively suspended in 1934 when Ruth Benedict published Patterns of Culture, which has continuously been in print. Although this book is well known for popularizing the Boasian principle of cultural relativism, among anthropologists it constituted both an important summary of the discoveries of Boasians, and a decisive break from Boas's emphasis on the mobility of diverse cultural traits. "Anthropological work has been overwhelmingly devoted to the analysis of cultural traits," she wrote "rather than to the study of cultures as articulated wholes." Influenced by Polish-British social anthropologist Bronisław Malinowski, however, she argued that "The first essential, so it seems today, is to study the living culture, to know its habits of thought and the functions of its institutions" and that "the only way in which we can know the significance of the selected detail of behavior is against the background of the motives and emotions and values that are institutionalized in that culture." Influenced by German historians Wilhelm Dilthey and Oswald Spengler, as well as by gestalt psychology, she argued that "the whole determines its parts, not only their relation but their very nature," and that "cultures, likewise, are more than the sum of their traits." She observed that "Just as each spoken language draws very selectively from an extensive, but finite, set of sounds any human mouth (free from defect) can make, she concluded that in each society people, over time and through both conscious and unconscious processes, selected from an extensive but finite set of cultural traits which then combine to form a unique and distinctive pattern." Further, Benedict argues

The significance of cultural behavior is not exhausted when we have clearly understood that it is local and man-made and hugely variable. It tends to be integrated. A culture, like an individual, is a more or less consistent pattern of thought and action. Within each culture there come into being characteristic purposes not necessarily shared by other types of society. In obedience to their purposes, each people further and further consolidates its experience, and in proportion to the urgency of these drives the heterogeneous items of behavior take more and more congruous shape. Taken up by a well-integrated culture, the most ill-assorted acts become characteristic of its particular goals, often by the most unlikely metamorphoses.

—

Although Benedict felt that virtually all cultures are patterned, she argued that these patterns change over time as a consequence of human creativity, and therefore different societies around the world had distinct characters. Patterns of Culture contrasts Zuňi, Dobu and Kwakiutl cultures as a way of highlighting different ways of being human. Benedict observed that many Westerners felt that this view forced them to abandon their "dreams of permanence and ideality and with the individual's illusions of autonomy" and that for many, this made existence "empty." She argued however that once people accepted the results of scientific research, people would "arrive then at a more realistic social faith, accepting as grounds of hope and as new bases for tolerance the coexisting and equally valid patterns of life which mankind has created for itself from the raw materials of existence."

This view of culture has had a tremendous impact outside of anthropology, and dominated American anthropology until the Cold War, when anthropologists like Sidney Mintz and Eric Wolf rejected the validity and value of approaching "each culture" as "a world in itself" and "relatively stable." They felt that, too often, this approach ignored the impact of imperialism, colonialism, and the world capitalist economy on the peoples Benedict and her followers studied (and thus re-opened the debate on the relationship between the universal and the particular, in the form of the relationship between the global and the local). In the meantime, its emphasis on metamorphosing patterns influenced French structuralism and made American anthropologists receptive to British structural-functionalism.

Turkish nomad clan with the nodes as marriages

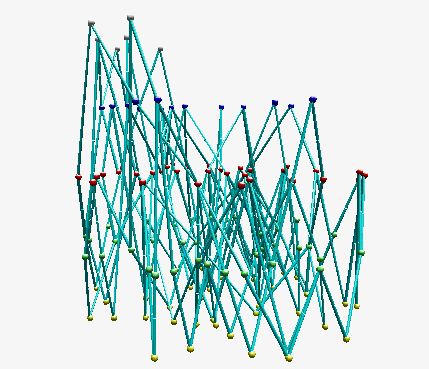
Mexican village with the nodes as marriages

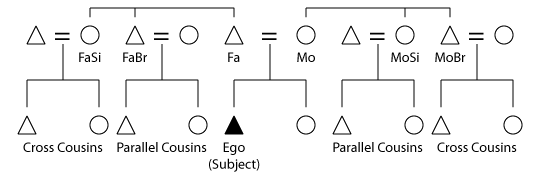
Iroqois Kinship Structure

The second debate has been over the ability to make universal claims about all cultures. Although Boas argued that anthropologists had yet to collect enough solid evidence from a diverse sample of societies to make any valid general or universal claims about culture, by the 1940s some felt ready. Whereas Kroeber and Benedict had argued that "culture"—which could refer to local, regional, or trans-regional scales—was in some way "patterned" or "configured," some anthropologists now felt that enough data had been collected to demonstrate that it often took highly structured forms. The question these anthropologists debated was, were these structures statistical artifacts, or where they expressions of mental models? This debate emerged full-fledged in 1949, with the publication of George Murdock's Social Structure, and Claude Lévi-Strauss's Les Structures Élémentaires de la Parenté.

Opposing Boas and his students was Yale anthropologist George Murdock, who compiled the Human Relations Area Files. These files code cultural variables found in different societies, so that anthropologists can use statistical methods to study correlations among different variables. The ultimate aim of this project is to develop generalizations that apply to increasingly larger numbers of individual cultures. Later, Murdock and Douglas R. White developed the standard cross-cultural sample as a way to refine this method.

French anthropologist Claude Lévi-Strauss's structuralist anthropology brought together ideas of Boas (especially Boas's belief in the mutability of cultural forms, and Bastian's belief in the psychic unity of humankind) and French sociologist Émile Durkheim's focus on social structures (institutionalized relationships among persons and groups of persons). Instead of making generalizations that applied to large numbers of societies, Lévi-Strauss sought to derive from concrete cases increasingly abstract models of human nature. His method begins with the supposition that culture exists in two different forms: the many distinct structures that could be inferred from observing members of the same society interact (and of which members of a society are themselves aware), and abstract structures developed by analyzing shared ways (such as myths and rituals) members of a society represent their social life (and of which members of a society are not only not consciously aware, but which moreover typically stand in opposition to, or negate, the social structures of which people are aware). He then sought to develop one universal mental structure that could only be inferred through the systematic comparison of particular social and cultural structures. He argued that just as there are laws through which a finite and relatively small number of chemical elements could be combined to create a seemingly infinite variety of things, there were a finite and relatively small number of cultural elements which people combine to create the great variety of cultures anthropologists observe. The systematic comparison of societies would enable an anthropologist to develop this cultural "table of elements," and once completed, this table of cultural elements would enable an anthropologist to analyze specific cultures and achieve insights hidden to the very people who produced and lived through these cultures. Structuralism came to dominate French anthropology and, in the late 1960s and 1970s, came to have great influence on American and British anthropology.

Murdock's HRAF and Lévi-Strauss's structuralism provide two ambitious ways to seek the universal in the particular, and both approaches continue to appeal to different anthropologists. However, the differences between them reveal a tension implicit in the heritage of Tylor and Bastian. Is culture to be found in empirically observed behaviors that may form the basis of generalizations? Or does it consist of universal mental processes, which must be inferred and abstracted from observed behavior? This question has driven debates among biological anthropologists and archeologists as well.

=== Structural functionalism ===
In structural functionalism, as a social theory, society is viewed as "a reality of structural and cultural components or "facts" that can be investigated". Thus in the 1940s the Boasian understanding of culture was challenged by that new paradigm for anthropological and social science research. This paradigm developed independently but in parallel in both the United Kingdom and in the United States (In both cases it is sui generis: it has no direct relationship to "structuralism" except that both French structuralism and Anglo-American Structural-Functionalism were all influenced by Durkheim. It is also analogous, but unrelated to, other forms of "functionalism"). Whereas the Boasians viewed anthropology as that natural science dedicated to the study of humankind, structural functionalists viewed anthropology as one social science among many, dedicated to the study of one specific facet of humanity. This led structural-functionalists to redefine and minimize the scope of "culture."

In the United Kingdom, the creation of structural functionalism was anticipated by Raymond Firth's (1901–2002) We the Tikopia, published in 1936, and marked by the publication of African Political Systems, edited by Meyer Fortes (1906–1983) and E.E. Evans-Pritchard (1902–1973) in 1940. In these works these anthropologists forwarded a synthesis of the ideas of their mentor, Bronisław Malinowski (1884–1942), and his rival, A. R. Radcliffe-Brown (1881–1955). Both Malinowski and Radcliffe-Brown viewed anthropology—what they call "social anthropology"—as that branch of sociology that studied so-called primitive societies.

According to Malinowski's theory of functionalism, all human beings have certain biological needs, such as the need for food and shelter, and humankind has the biological need to reproduce. Every society develops its own institutions, which function to fulfill these needs. In order for these institutions to function, individuals take on particular social roles that regulate how they act and interact. Although members of any given society may not understand the ultimate functions of their roles and institutions, an ethnographer can develop a model of these functions through the careful observation of social life. Radcliffe-Brown rejected Malinowski's notion of function, and believed that a general theory of primitive social life could only be built up through the careful comparison of different societies. Influenced by the work of French sociologist Émile Durkheim (1858–1917), who argued that primitive and modern societies are distinguished by distinct social structures, Radcliffe-Brown argued that anthropologists first had to map out the social structure of any given society before comparing the structures of different societies.

Firth, Fortes, and Evans-Pritchard found it easy to combine Malinowski's attention to social roles and institutions with Radcliffe-Brown's concern with social structures. They distinguished between "social organization" (observable social interactions) and "social structure" (rule-governed patterns of social interaction), and shifted their attention from biological functions to social functions. For example, how different institutions are functionally integrated, and the extent to, and ways in, which institutions function to promote social solidarity and stability. In short, instead of culture (understood as all human non-genetic or extra-somatic phenomena) they made "sociality" (interactions and relationships among persons and groups of people) their object of study. (Indeed, Radcliffe-Brown once wrote "I should like to invoke a taboo on the word culture.")

Coincidentally, in 1946 sociologist Talcott Parsons (1902–1979) founded the Department of Social Relations at Harvard University. Influenced by such European sociologists as Émile Durkheim and Max Weber, Parsons developed a theory of social action that was closer to British social anthropology than to Boas's American anthropology, and which he also called "structural functionalism." Parson's intention was to develop a total theory of social action (why people act as they do), and to develop at Harvard an inter-disciplinary program that would direct research according to this theory. His model explained human action as the result of four systems:

1. the "behavioral system" of biological needs
2. the "personality system" of an individual's characteristics affecting their functioning in the social world
3. the "social system" of patterns of units of social interaction, especially social status and role
4. the "cultural system" of norms and values that regulate social action symbolically

According to this theory, the second system was the proper object of study for psychologists; the third system for sociologists, and the fourth system for cultural anthropologists. Whereas the Boasians considered all of these systems to be objects of study by anthropologists, and "personality" and "status and role" to be as much a part of "culture" as "norms and values," Parsons envisioned a much narrower role for anthropology and a much narrower definition of culture.

Although Boasian cultural anthropologists were interested in norms and values, among many other things, it was only with the rise of structural functionalism that people came to identify "culture" with "norms and values." Many American anthropologists rejected this view of culture (and by implication, anthropology). In 1980, anthropologist Eric Wolf wrote,

As the social sciences transformed themselves into "behavioral" science, explanations for behavior were no longer traced to culture: behavior was to be understood in terms of psychological encounters, strategies of economic choice, strivings for payoffs in games of power. Culture, once extended to all acts and ideas employed in social life, was now relegated to the margins as "world view" or "values".

—

Nevertheless, several of Talcott Parsons' students emerged as leading American anthropologists. At the same time, many American anthropologists had a high regard for the research produced by social anthropologists in the 1940s and 1950s, and found structural-functionalism to provide a very useful model for conducting ethnographic research.

The combination of American cultural anthropology theory with British social anthropology methods has led to some confusion between the concepts of "society" and "culture." For most anthropologists, these are distinct concepts. Society refers to a group of people; culture refers to a pan-human capacity and the totality of non-genetic human phenomena. Societies are often clearly bounded; cultural traits are often mobile, and cultural boundaries, such as they are, can be typically porous, permeable, and plural. During the 1950s, and 1960s anthropologists often worked in places where social and cultural boundaries coincided, thus obscuring the distinction. When disjunctures between these boundaries become highly salient, for example during the period of European de-colonization of Africa in the 1960s and 1970s, or during the post-Bretton Woods realignment of globalization, however, the difference often becomes central to anthropological debates.

=== Symbolic versus adaptive ===
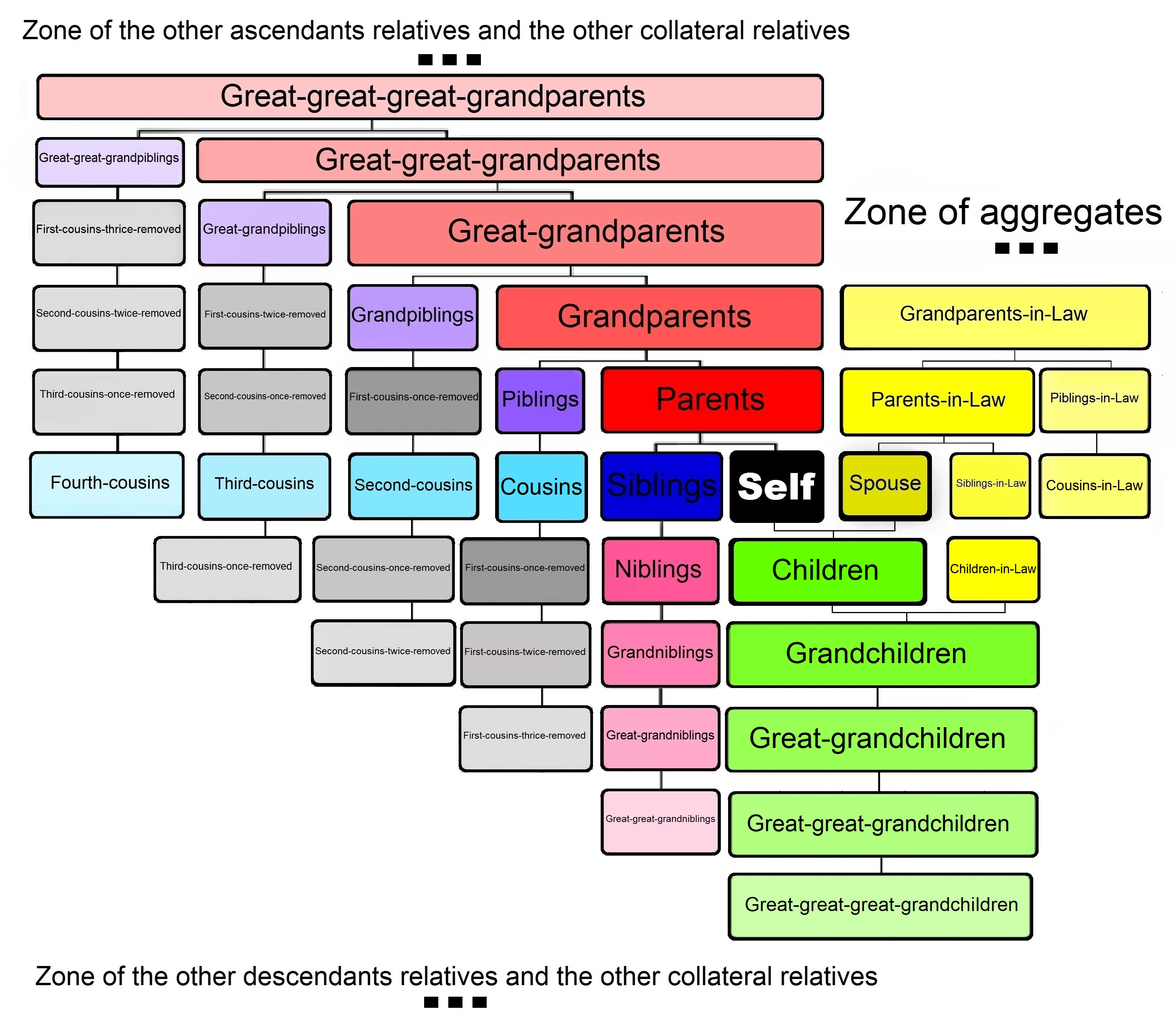
American kinship

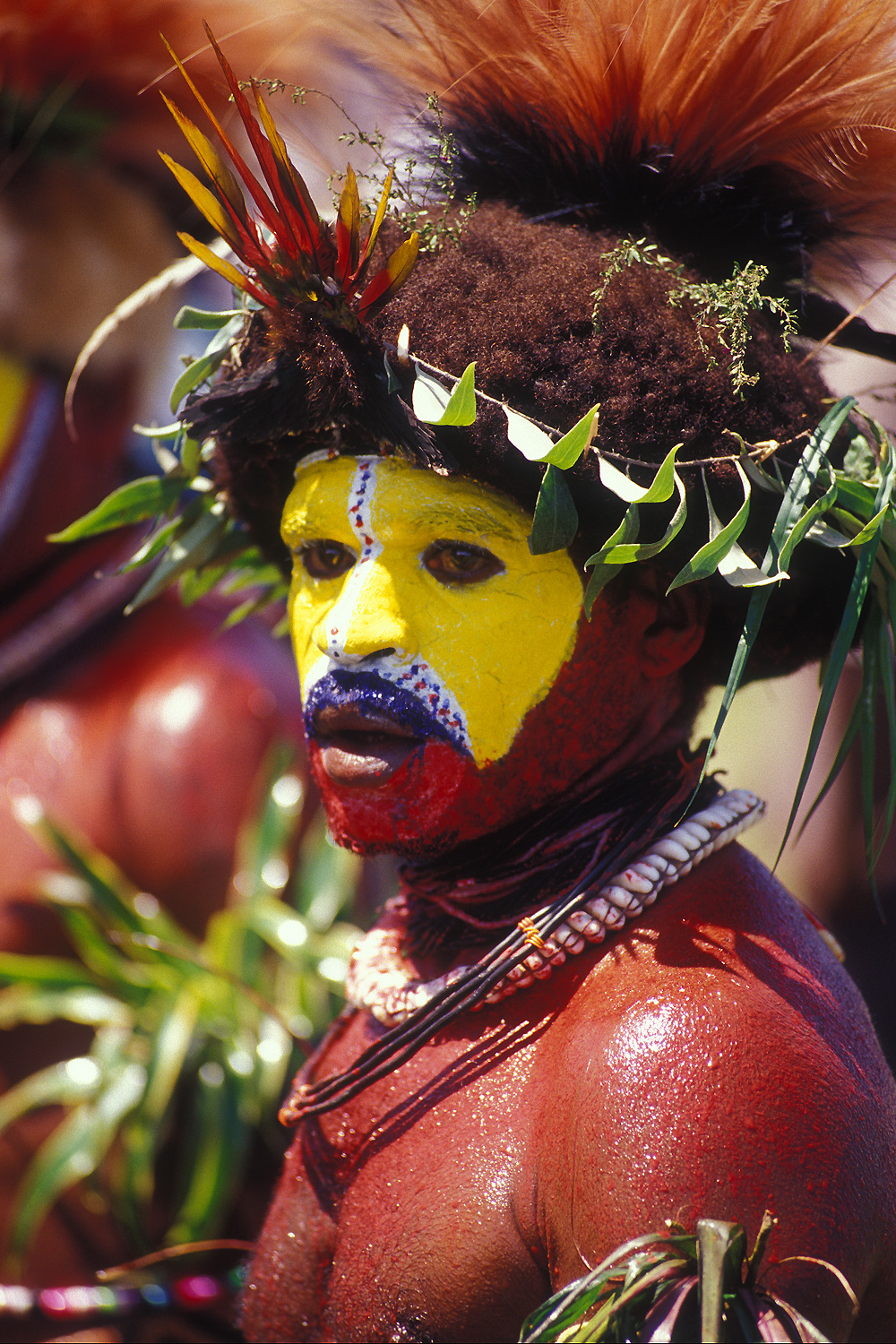
Huli Wigman from the Southern Highlands

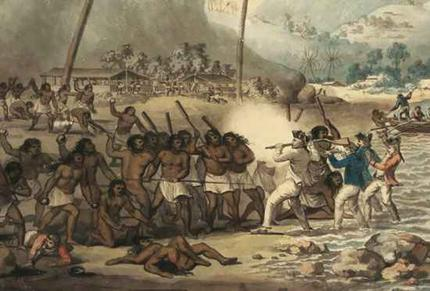
Cleveley's depiction of Captain Cook

Parsons' students Clifford Geertz and David M. Schneider, and Schneider's student Roy Wagner, went on to important careers as cultural anthropologists and developed a school within American cultural anthropology called "symbolic anthropology," the study of the social construction and social effects of symbols. Since symbolic anthropology easily complemented social anthropologists' studies of social life and social structure, many British structural-functionalists (who rejected or were uninterested in Boasian cultural anthropology) accepted the Parsonian definition of "culture" and "cultural anthropology." British anthropologist Victor Turner (who eventually left the United Kingdom to teach in the United States) was an important bridge between American and British symbolic anthropology.

Attention to symbols, the meaning of which depended almost entirely on their historical and social context, appealed to many Boasians. Leslie White asked of cultural things, "What sort of objects are they? Are they physical objects? Mental objects? Both? Metaphors? Symbols? Reifications?" In Science of Culture (1949), he concluded that they are objects "sui generis"; that is, of their own kind. In trying to define that kind, he hit upon a previously unrealized aspect of symbolization, which he called "the symbolate"—an object created by the act of symbolization. He thus defined culture as "symbolates understood in an extra-somatic context."

Nevertheless, by the 1930s White began turning away from the Boasian approach. He wrote,

In order to live man, like all other species, must come to terms with the external world.... Man employs his sense organs, nerves, glands, and muscles in adjusting himself to the external world. But in addition to this he has another means of adjustment and control.... This mechanism is culture.

—

Although this view echoes that of Malinowski, the key concept for White was not "function" but "adaptation." Whereas the Boasians were interested in the history of specific traits, White was interested in the cultural history of the human species, which he felt should be studied from an evolutionary perspective. Thus, the task of anthropology is to study "not only how culture evolves, but why as well.... In the case of man ... the power to invent and to discover, the ability to select and use the better of two tools or ways of doing something— these are the factors of cultural evolution." Unlike 19th century evolutionists, who were concerned with how civilized societies rose above primitive societies, White was interested in documenting how, over time, humankind as a whole has through cultural means discovered more and more ways for capturing and harnessing energy from the environment, in the process transforming culture.

At the same time that White was developing his theory of cultural evolution, Kroeber's student Julian Steward was developing his theory of cultural ecology. In 1938, he published Basin-Plateau Aboriginal Socio-Political Groups in which he argued that diverse societies—for example the indigenous Shoshone or White farmers on the Great Plains—were not less or more evolved; rather, they had adapted to different environments in different ways. Whereas Leslie White was interested in culture understood holistically as a property of the human species, Julian Steward was interested in culture as the property of distinct societies. Like White he viewed culture as a means of adapting to the environment, but he criticized Whites "unilineal" (one direction) theory of cultural evolution and instead proposed a model of "multilineal" evolution in which (in the Boasian tradition) each society has its own cultural history.

When Julian Steward left a teaching position at the University of Michigan to work in Utah in 1930, Leslie White took his place; in 1946 Julian Steward was made Chair of the Columbia University Anthropology Department. In the 1940s and 1950s their students, most notably Marvin Harris, Sidney Mintz, Robert Murphy, Roy Rappaport, Marshall Sahlins, Elman Service, Andrew P. Vayda and Eric Wolf dominated American anthropology. Most promoted materialist understandings of culture in opposition to the symbolic approaches of Geertz and Schneider. Harris, Rappaport, and Vayda were especially important for their contributions to cultural materialism and ecological anthropology, both of which argued that "culture" constituted an extra-somatic (or non-biological) means through which human beings could adapt to life in drastically differing physical environments.

The debate between symbolic and materialist approaches to culture dominated American anthropologists in the 1960s and 1970s. The Vietnam War and the publication of Dell Hymes' Reinventing Anthropology, however, marked a growing dissatisfaction with the then dominant approaches to culture. Hymes argued that fundamental elements of the Boasian project such as holism and an interest in diversity were still worth pursuing: "interest in other peoples and their ways of life, and concern to explain them within a frame of reference that includes ourselves." Moreover, he argued that cultural anthropologists are singularly well-equipped to lead this study (with an indirect rebuke to sociologists like Parsons who sought to subsume anthropology to their own project):

In the practice there is a traditional place for openness to phenomena in ways not predefined by theory or design – attentiveness to complex phenomena, to phenomena of interest, perhaps aesthetic, for their own sake, to the sensory as well as intellectual, aspects of the subject. These comparative and practical perspectives, though not unique to formal anthropology, are specially husbanded there, and might well be impaired, if the study of man were to be united under the guidance of others who lose touch with experience in concern for methodology, who forget the ends of social knowledge in elaborating its means, or who are unwittingly or unconcernedly culture-bound.

—

It is these elements, Hymes argued, that justify a "general study of man," that is, "anthropology".

During this time notable anthropologists such as Mintz, Murphy, Sahlins, and Wolf eventually broke away; experimenting with structuralist and Marxist approaches to culture, they continued to promote cultural anthropology against structural functionalism.

=== Local versus global ===
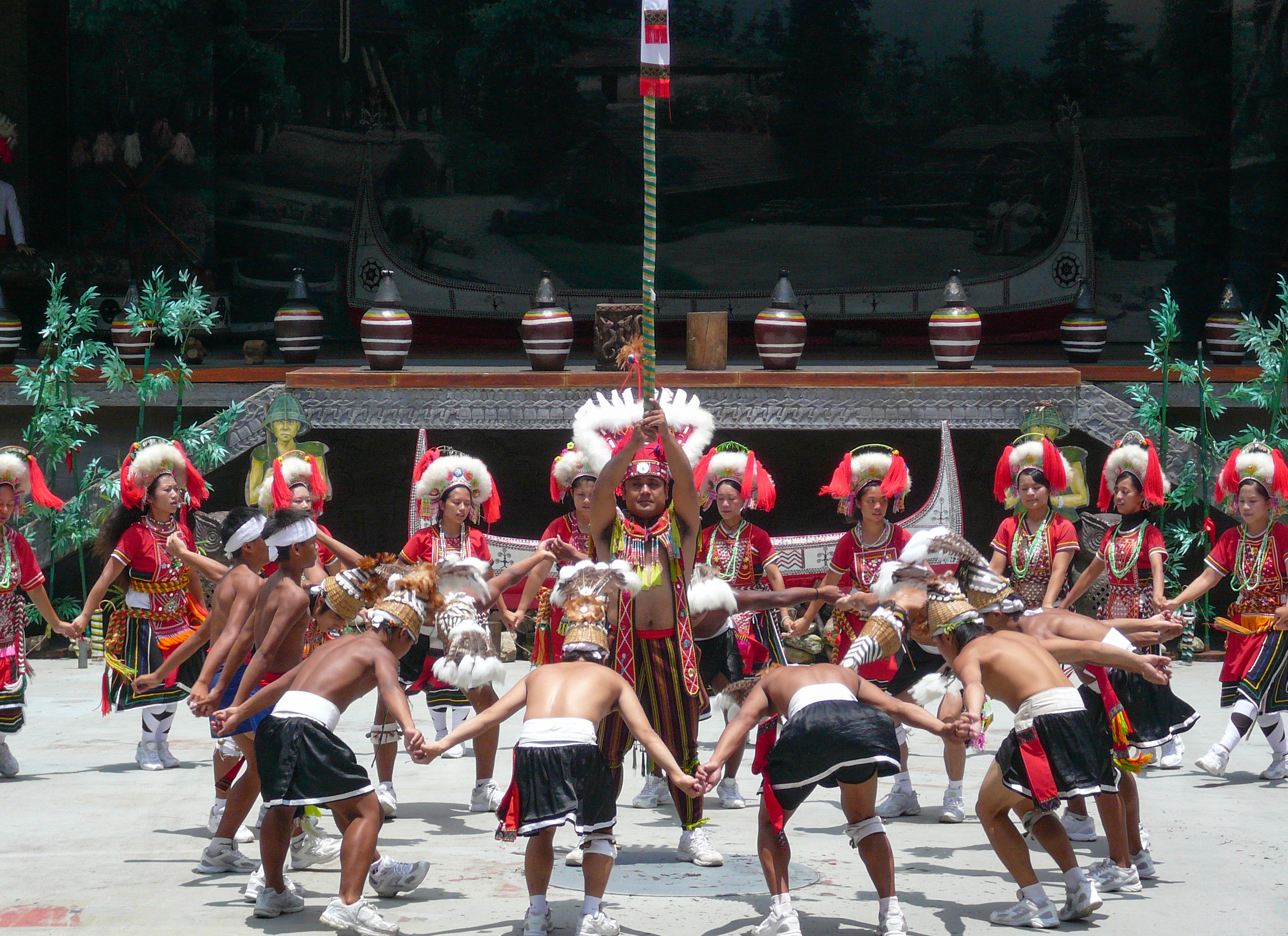
Taiwanese aborigines dancing

Boas and Malinowski established ethnographic research as a highly localized method for studying culture. Yet Boas emphasized that culture is dynamic, moving from one group of people to another, and that specific cultural forms have to be analyzed in a larger context. This has led anthropologists to explore different ways of understanding the global dimensions of culture.

In the 1940s and 1950s, several key studies focused on how trade between indigenous peoples and the Europeans who had conquered and colonized the Americas influenced indigenous culture, either through change in the organization of labor, or change in critical technologies. Bernard Mishkin studied the effect of the introduction of horses on Kiowa political organization and warfare. Oscar Lewis explored the influence of the fur trade on Blackfoot culture (relying heavily on historical sources). Joseph Jablow documented how Cheyenne social organization and subsistence strategy between 1795 and 1840 were determined by their position in trade networks linking Whites and other Indians. Frank Secoy argued that Great Plains Indians' social organization and military tactics changed as horses, introduced by the Spanish in the south, diffused north, and guns, introduced by the British and French in the east, diffused west.

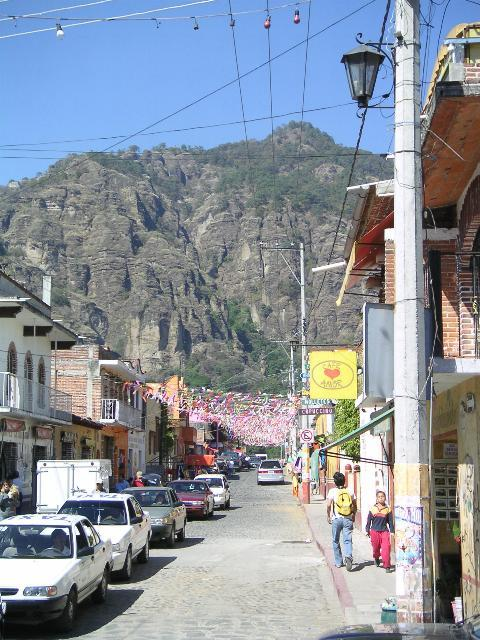
The Tepozteco mountain dominates views from Tepoztlán.

In the 1950s, Robert Redfield and students of Julian Steward pioneered "community studies," namely, the study of distinct communities (whether identified by race, ethnicity, or economic class) in Western or "Westernized" societies, especially cities. They thus encountered the antagonisms 19th century critics described using the terms "high culture" and "low culture." These 20th-century anthropologists struggled to describe people who were politically and economically inferior but not, they believed, culturally inferior. Oscar Lewis proposed the concept of a "culture of poverty" to describe the cultural mechanisms through which people adapted to a life of economic poverty. Other anthropologists and sociologists began using the term "sub-culture" to describe culturally distinct communities that were part of larger societies.

One important kind of subculture is that formed by an immigrant community. In dealing with immigrant groups and their cultures, there are various approaches:

- Leitkultur (core culture): A model developed in Germany by Bassam Tibi. The idea is that minorities can have an identity of their own, but they should at least support the core concepts of the culture on which the society is based.
- Melting pot: In the United States, the traditional view has been one of a melting pot where all the immigrant cultures are mixed and amalgamated without state intervention.
- Monoculturalism: In some European states, culture is very closely linked to nationalism, thus government policy is to assimilate immigrants, although recent increases in migration have led many European states to experiment with forms of multiculturalism.
- Multiculturalism: A policy that immigrants and others should preserve their cultures with the different cultures interacting peacefully within one nation.

The way nation states treat immigrant cultures rarely falls neatly into one or another of the above approaches. The degree of difference with the host culture (i.e., "foreignness"), the number of immigrants, attitudes of the resident population, the type of government policies that are enacted, and the effectiveness of those policies all make it difficult to generalize about the effects. Similarly with other subcultures within a society, attitudes of the mainstream population and communications between various cultural groups play a major role in determining outcomes. The study of cultures within a society is complex and research must take into account a myriad of variables.
