= Margaret Hodgen =

American sociologist (1890–1977)

Margaret Trabue Hodgen (1890 – 22 January 1977) was an American sociologist and author.

Hodgen was a professor of sociology at the University of California, Berkeley. Hodgen wrote the highly influential Doctrine of Survivals, first published as a book in 1936, but originally launched in the journal American Anthropology in 1931.

Hodgen completed her doctoral thesis, Workers' Education in England and the United States in 1925.

== Publications ==
- Workers' education in England & the United States, London, K. Paul, Trench, Trubner & Co. 1925.
- Change and history : a study of the dated distributions of technological innovations in England, New York, Johnson 1952.
- Early Anthropology in the Sixteenth and Seventeenth Centuries, Philadelphia, Pa University of Pennsylvania Press 1964.
- Anthropology, history, and cultural change, Tucson, University of Arizona Press 1974.
