= Conjunctive archaeology =

Method combining archaeology and anthropology

Conjunctive archaeology is a method of studying of the past developed by Walter Taylor in the 1940s that combined elements of both traditional archaeology and the allied field of anthropology. It is exemplified by Taylor's A Study of Archeology (1948).

Taylor saw archaeology as an integrated discipline, combining the study of diet, settlement patterns, tools and other elements to provide a holistic view of the past. Elements of Taylor's approach are now a standard practice in the discipline, but Taylor's open and specific criticism of leading archaeologists of his day caused dismay amongst many archaeologists.

Taylor was one of the first to criticize the descriptive, historical approaches to archaeology that dominated the discipline. According to Patty Jo Watson, Taylor's purpose "was not to generate ill will but rather to stimulate examination ... of aims, goals and purposes by American archaeologists".

== A Study of Archaeology ==
Walter Taylor was the founder of conjunctive archaeology. He was born in Chicago and studied at Yale. He saw archaeology as a discipline that was multifaceted, and tried to focus on Anthropology and Archaeology to form a well-balanced and all-consuming study. He was frustrated by the focus of his contemporaries on typologies, chronological reconstructions, and other elements of archaeology that he saw as formalist and restricting. He put forward his polemical ideas in A Study of Archaeology, which served as a critique of culture-historical archaeology and put forward his prescription of a conjunctive archaeology. Taylor was reacting to what he saw as his contemporaries' limited use of artifacts to produce culture chronologies and identify groups as opposed to their stated goals of reconstructing prehistory. In response, he offered that archaeologists should focus more on quantitative data and spatial distributions of artifacts and features within sites. Part of this new focus on sites as units of analysis would require the collection of what might have appeared as trivial data, as well as paying better attention to things like paleoenvironmental data. All this was done with the aim of developing comparative approaches at the site level and beyond.

Taylor's A Study of Archaeology provided a number of early impacts. First, it was a history of Americanist archaeology. Alongside V. Gordon Childe and especially Grahame Clark, he envisaged an archaeology that saw the necessary goal of archaeology as the reconstruction of prehistoric lifeways with a focus on cultures as "functioning entities embracing social, political, and ideological as well as economic components that the archaeologist must try to study holistically from the inside".

Perhaps conjunctive archaeology's most unique legacy was being among the first rigorous attempts at examining archaeology through the lens of Boasian anthropology. Utilizing this lens, Taylor departed from Childe's and Clark's more materialist aims (the former working in something of a Marxist tradition and the latter in an early form of a paleoenvironmental approach). Anticipating psychological anthropology, Taylor held an idealist vision of human culture and sought to learn about the beliefs and ideologies of past peoples through material culture.

== Influence ==
The influence of conjunctive archaeology on the field is somewhat controversial. Taylor claimed until he died that his ideas were a major theoretical contribution that anticipated and directly contributed to The New Archaeology. Perhaps the most public and central debate on the topic of conjunctive archaeology's influence on later archaeologists was the extended debate in publications between Taylor and the major processual theorist Lewis Binford. Taylor claimed that his ideas included testing of hypotheses and a systems approach decades before processual archaeology.

Taylor's claims are difficult to assess. While he clearly shared some goals with the later processualists, he also very evidently diverged from them in crucial theoretical ways. The core difference was his reliance on Boas. The idealist conception of culture that Taylor put forward via Boas is at odds with the more materialist aims of the processualists. Perhaps the core separation between processualists and Walter Taylor is the latter's ambivalence if not rejection of the idea of Material culture. Taylor instead believed that all culture was ideational and that artifacts merely reflected it.

Some scholars have contributed to an edited volume reflecting on Taylor's impact in an ambivalent way. In this book, the argument is partially laid out that Taylor's work might have had influence on Post-processual archaeology rather than processual, given his focus on ideational elements of culture as well as his deep conviction of the importance of a historical and historiographic approach (as compared to the processualists' aims for objectivity).

Perhaps the most difficult part of interpreting Taylor's influence on the discipline as a whole is that neither he nor anyone else ever produced a substantive work within the framework of conjunctive archaeology. While his theoretical goals were clear, Taylor's methodology was left somewhat vague. Because of the multifaceted nature of Taylor's work and the fact that his work unites many strains of archaeology that are today seen as being at odds, Taylor's legacy in the field will likely always be at least somewhat controversial.

== Bibliography ==
- Ian Hodders Review
