= Walter Taylor (archaeologist) =

Walter Willard Taylor Jr. (1913 – April 14, 1997) was an American anthropologist and archaeologist most famous for his work at Coahuila in Mexico and his "Conjunctive archaeology", a method of studying the past combining elements of both the traditional archaeology of the period and the allied field of anthropology. This was exemplified by his work A Study of Archeology.

== Life ==
Taylor was born in Chicago, but he grew up in Greenwich, Connecticut, and attended The Hotchkiss School. Although studying geology, while at Yale University Taylor became interested in anthropology and archaeology. He graduated in 1935, and that summer began working for the Museum of Northern Arizona in Flagstaff, where he was influenced by the holistic environmental philosophy of Lyndon Hargrave.

After three years in the field, he enrolled for a Ph.D. in anthropology at Harvard in 1938. When World War II broke out, Taylor enlisted in the U.S. Marines, serving in Europe and being parachuted into enemy territory to assist local resistance groups. He was badly wounded by a grenade and captured in southern France in 1944 and was not released from a German prisoner-of-war camp until the end of the war in Europe. During his imprisonment, he began teaching anthropology to his fellow prisoners. He earned a Purple Heart and Bronze Star and remained a captain until 1955.

After the war Taylor moved around the United States until settling in Carbondale, Illinois, in 1958, where he began working at Southern Illinois University's Department of Anthropology.

He also taught at the University of Texas, the University of Washington, Mexico City College, and Mexico's National School of Anthropology and History. He carried out investigations at sites in Arizona, New Mexico, Georgia, Mexico, and Spain, before retiring in 1974.

== Ideas ==
Taylor saw archaeology as an integrated discipline, combining the study of diet, settlement patterns, tools and other elements to provide a holistic view of the past. His conjunctive approach attempted to determine cultural context by connecting the correlated patterns in the archaeological record to patterns of culture. This approach, along with his open and specific criticism of leading archaeologists of his day, caused dismay among many archaeologists at the time but is now a standard practice in the discipline. Taylor was one of the first to loudly decry the descriptive, historical approaches in the field. However, Patty Jo Watson said that Taylor's purpose "was not to generate ill will but rather to stimulate examination...of aims, goals and purposes by American archaeologists."

Taylor's work anticipated by many years the efforts of the "New Archaeologists" of the 1960s, and A Study of Archeology remains in print.
