= Allamuchy =

Allamuchy may refer to the following in the U.S. state of New Jersey:

- Allamuchy Mountain State Park, in Byram Township
- Allamuchy Township, New Jersey, in Warren County
  - Allamuchy (CDP), New Jersey, a census-designated place in the township
  - Allamuchy Freight House, in the above township, built by the Lehigh and Hudson River Railway
  - Allamuchy-Panther Valley, New Jersey, a census-designated place and unincorporated area in the above township
  - Allamuchy Township School District, serves the above township
