= Guinea Town, New York =

Free Black settlement

Coordinates: 41.788°N 73.927°W

Guinea Town is an early free Black community that was formed with the help of Hicksite Quakers in Old Westbury, New York in 1793 and remained active until just after the Civil War.

== History ==
Guinea Town played a part in transporting runaway enslaved Africans to Dartmouth, Nova Scotia, which was a Quaker community. Eliakim Levi was a leader in the Black community of Guinea Town, in New York and a conductor with the Hicksites on the Underground Railroad. Hicksites were Quakers who were followers of Elias Hicks. The Hicks family gave land to establish Guinea Town, the early free black community in Old Westbury, New York.

Elias Hicks was instrumental in ensuring the opening, on April 27, 1817, of a primary school and Sunday school for Blacks in the Westbury neighborhood then known as Guinea Town, near today's Glen Cove Road and the southwestern corner of the access road to the Long Island Expressway. By 1830, the community had its own church.

In 2005 the Black Ice Project/Underground Railroad project was created to identify connections between slavery, safe houses in Brooklyn, transit through Guinea Town, and ex-slaves who played hockey in Canada. The project works to identify Quaker families, free Africans and runaway slaves who were part of the 1800s underground railroad network.
