= Nine Partners Meeting House and Cemetery =

Historic site in Dutchess County, New York

- U.S. National Register of Historic Places
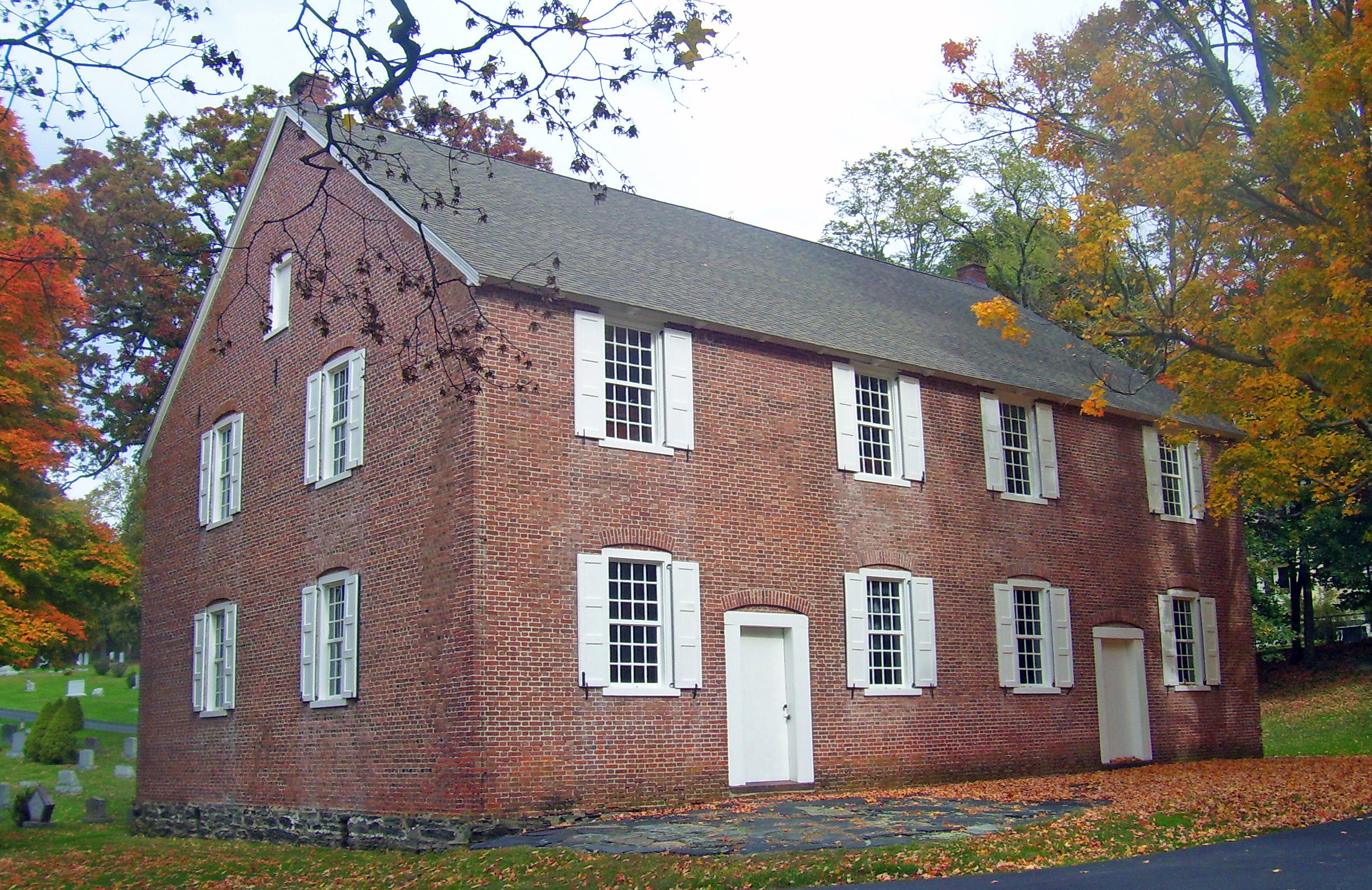
- South elevation and west profile, 2008

- Location within New York Location within the United States
- Location: Millbrook, NY
- Nearest city: Poughkeepsie
- Coordinates: 41°46′32.757″N 73°41′15.0858″W
- Area: 9 acres (3.6 ha)
- Built: 1780
- MPS: Dutchess County Quaker Meeting Houses TR
- NRHP reference No.: 89000300
- Added to NRHP: April 27, 1989

The Nine Partners Meeting House and Cemetery is located at the junction of NY state highway 343 and Church Street, in the village of Millbrook, New York, United States. The meeting house, the third one on the site, was built by a group of Friends ("Quakers") from the Cape Cod region, Nantucket and Rhode Island in 1780.

It was the largest meeting in the Hudson Valley, and many other meetings split off from it. Unusually, it was located near a developed area, and the Friends in it were more prosperous than their co-religionists elsewhere in the region. Its size and use of brick, along with several other architectural features, are unusual for meeting houses.

Attendance at meetings dwindled over the course of the 19th century, and in 1897 control of the property was turned over to the Nine Partners Burial Ground Association. It is still used for occasional Quaker events, and is well preserved from the days of its regular use. In 1989 it was listed on the National Register of Historic Places as part of a Multiple Property Submission of Quaker meeting houses in Dutchess County.

== Buildings and grounds ==
The meeting house and cemetery are located on a 9-acre (3.6 ha) lot at the northeast corner of the road intersection. The undulating terrain slopes up gently towards the northeast. The surrounding properties are similar large lots, some wooded and others cleared, used for residential purposes.

There are four contributing resources on the property. The meeting house itself is located at the southeast corner, with the cemetery taking up the north and west. Behind the meeting house are a garage and shed, both modern and non-contributing, with a contributing well and pumphouse closer to the cemetery. In front of it is a sundial, a contributing object. A fence with brick entrance gates runs along Route 343.

The meeting house is a two-and-a-half-story four-bay structure with load-bearing brick and masonry walls on a stone foundation topped with a gabled roof pierced by brick chimneys at either end. Outside dimensions are 43' 8" (13.3 m) wide by 60' 5" (18.4 m) long and 35' 1½" (10.71 m) tall. The walls are 22¾" (57.8 cm) thick. The bricks are laid with two stretcher course and one header course with half-inch (13 mm) joints of the original lime mortar.

All facades feature double-hung sash windows with white louvered shutters. They are 12-over-12 pane glass except on the lower north wall, where they are 8-over-8. Most of sashes contain the original glazing. Two plain wooden doors give entrance between the windows on either end. Arched brick lintels are used over the windows and doors. The sashes, doors, sills, shutters and frames are original, made of cypress wood.

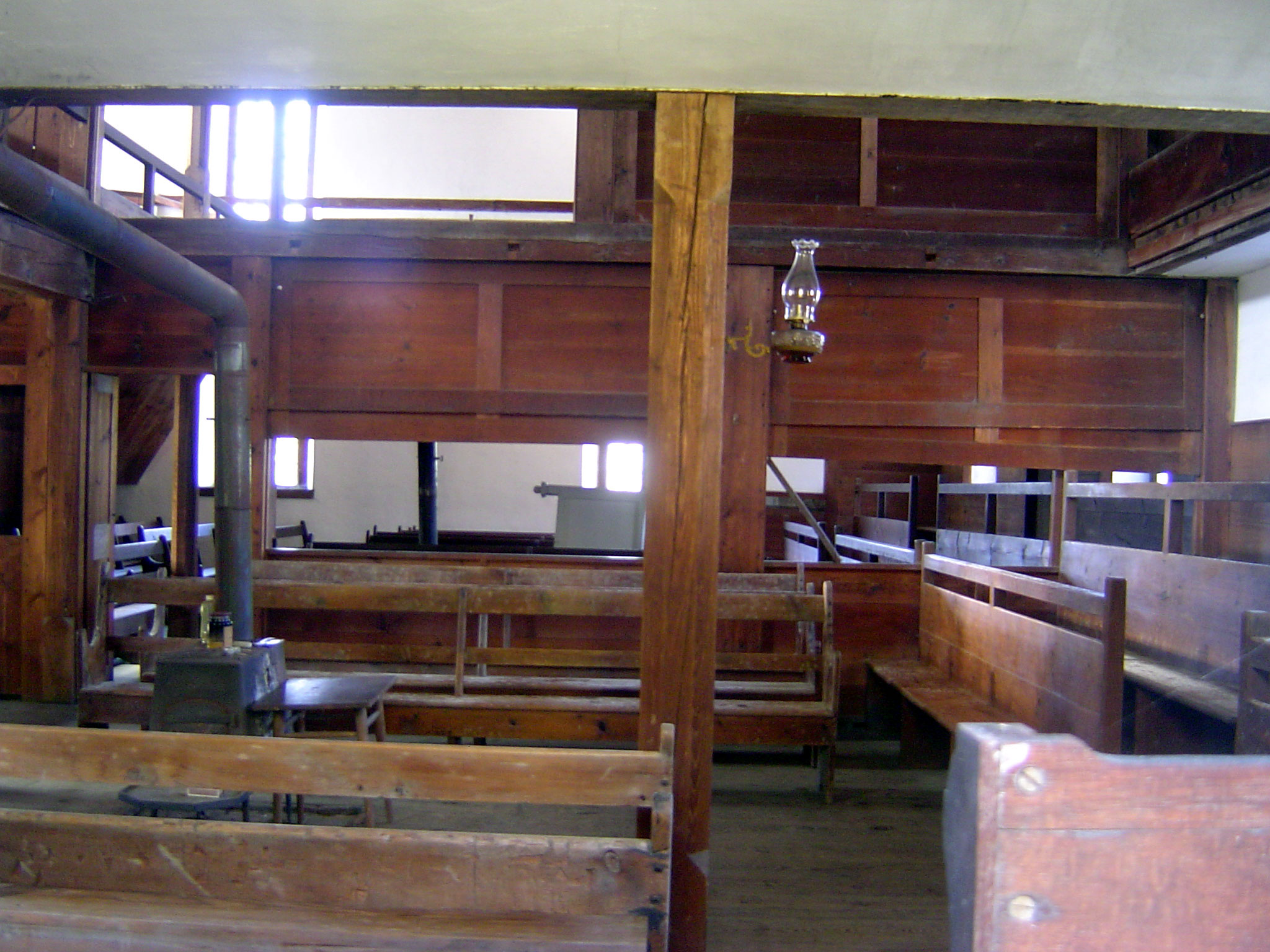
Interior view

The interior is one large room, divided into two chambers width-wise with counterbalanced, sliding wooden partitions through the middle of both floors. The doubled style meeting house design, first used by the Buckingham Friends Meeting House in Buckingham, Pennsylvania, allowed for the separation of sexes during worship services, as was the custom of the day. Each chamber has rows of wooden benches arranged around a central area, including an elevated Facing Bench where Weighty Friends would sit. A feature unique to Nine Partners among meeting houses in the area is the vestibule created later by building a lengthwise interior wall along the south side.

In the central area there is a wood stove placed on a stone hearth and an oil lamp mounted on a post. Interior walls are original horsehair plaster and unpainted paneling. Wooden interior columns are rounded rather than chamfered as in other meetinghouses in Dutchess County.

The second floor consists of a balcony, supported by the same post and beam framing as the roof, forming a gallery looking into the central area of each first floor chamber, divided in the same manner as the first floor. There is a provision to place wood planks over the gallery opening to the first floor, separating the second floor from the first floor completely. The chimneys do not transition through the meeting area to the ground level, but rather are supported by the summer beam (lengthwise support beam) in the attic. This was done to preserve the meeting space below intact.

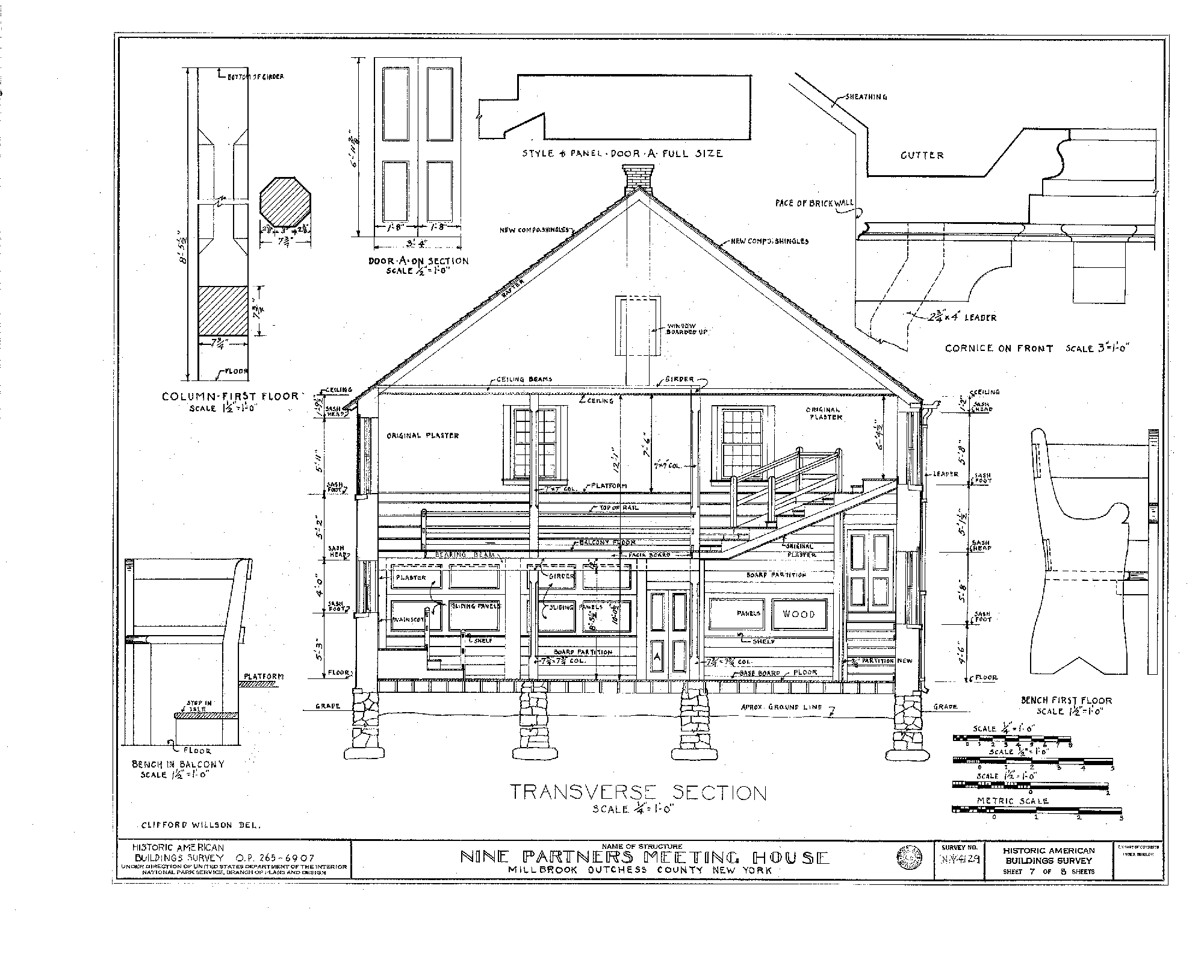
Transverse section

With few exceptions, such as the placement of one lengthwise interior wall creating the above-mentioned vestibule, gutters added in the 1970s, composite shingles on the roof introduced the following decade, and basic repairs and maintenance, the structure remains unaltered from is original state. There has been no retrofitting of electrical, plumbing or central heating.

== Cemetery ==
The earliest graves are unmarked and occupy a hillside adjacent to the corner of Church Street and route 343. The earliest grave marker with a death date is from 1807. The cemetery is administered by Lyall Memorial Federated Church and is one of two still in use in the Village of Millbrook.

Those graves closer to the meetinghouse are strictly those of member Friends from the early years of the meeting. As such they reflect Quaker aesthetics enough that that section of the cemetery is considered a contributing resource to the National Register listing. Later on, further away, burials were accepted from other faiths, introducing other funerary art customs. That portion of the cemetery is not considered contributing.

== History ==
From the 1740s, Quakers had been settling in the area of Mechanic, today known as South Millbrook. They began meeting in each other's homes. There were enough that by 1744, the quarterly meeting at Purchase in Westchester County set up a new monthly meeting for Dutchess County, called the Oblong and Nine Partners Meeting, given the common names of their general locations. It alternated its meetings each month between the Oblong house in Pawling and a log meeting house on the six acres (2.4 ha) where the present meeting house stands. It was replaced with a larger one in 1751 as the meeting grew.

In 1767, the meeting began considering whether slavery was compatible with Christianity, one of the first instances of an American congregation taking up the question. In 1688 The Germantown Quakers (along with some of their Mennonite converts) had drafted an anti-slavery petition. The Oblong and Nine Partners meetings were separated two years later after they had both acquired enough members to justify separate organizations. They both decided that they could not accept slaveholders or any who profited from slavery as members or financial supporters, and continued to work to convince local slaveowners to free those they held. Through the Civil War, the Nine Partners Meeting and School was known to coordinate the Underground Railroad activities in Dutchess and Columbia counties.

The log meeting house was replaced with a larger one was destroyed by fire on December 27, 1778. A committee was established in April of the following year to build a more permanent structure, measuring approximately 40 by 50 feet (12 by 15 m). It was designed collectively by the meeting members.

The large brick meeting house was built in 1780 at more than twice its originally budgeted cost, possibly due to the members' inexperience in bricklaying. The bricks were made a short distance directly south of the building on a farm known as Altamont Stock Farm which was the property of H. Howard Davison. The choice of brick was an unusual one for a Quaker meeting house, reflecting the greater prosperity of the meeting members and their location in a less remote area, along the Dutchess Turnpike that is today the route of US 44. Quakers from other meetings who visited found the Nine Partners' Friends and their meetinghouse somewhat worldly.

The success of the Nine Partners meeting helped the Society grow in the Hudson Valley. Several other meetings in the county were started within it as preparative meetings, and outside the county it led to the establishment of the Cornwall meeting in Orange County, still active today, along with meetings as far away as what is now Canada. It soon became a quarterly meeting.

Situated to the east and slightly uphill was the former store of Samuel Mabbett, a somewhat strayed Friend and known to be a Loyalist during the Revolutionary War. In 1796, the Nine Partners Meeting purchased the store and converted it to the Nine Partners Boarding School. The school enrolled up to one hundred students at a time and stayed in service until 1863, when the students transferred to the Oakwood Friends School (then known Oakwood Seminary at Union Springs,) in Poughkeepsie. Among its alumni were Lucretia Mott and Daniel Anthony, father of Daniel and Susan B. Anthony. Within a few years of closing, the former school building and land was purchased by John D. Wing, a former student of the school. The school building was moved to the top of the hill and became a part of his estate house.

In 1826, the Meeting split into Hicksite and Orthodox Quakers.The Hicksite branch retained use of the brick meeting house and cemetery, while the Orthodox Quakers retained the school and built their own smaller meeting house between the school and the brick meeting house. This structure remained in place until 1882, when it was removed to the Village of Millbrook. In 1897, the brick meeting house and cemetery were turned over to the Nine Partners Burial Ground Association, ending Quaker ownership of the site. The Nine Partners School would eventually change location and become what is now Oakwood Friends School

The Nine Partners Monthly Meeting continues as a part of the New York Yearly Meeting. The meeting house is used during the summer months. During the winter, the meeting is held at the Lyall Memorial Federated Church in Millbrook.

== See also ==
- National Register of Historic Places listings in Dutchess County, New York
