= Panther Valley, New Jersey =

Populated place in Warren County, New Jersey, US

- Census-designated place
- Location of Panther Valley in Warren County Location in New Jersey Location in the United States
- Coordinates: 40.911287°N 74.840643°W
- Country: United States
- State: New Jersey
- County: Warren
- Township: Allamuchy

Area
  - Total: 2.99 sq mi (7.74 km^{2})
  - Land: 2.98 sq mi (7.73 km^{2})
  - Water: 0.0077 sq mi (0.02 km^{2}) 0.48%
- Elevation: 590 ft (180 m)

Population (2020)
  - Total: 4,391
  - Density: 1,472.0/sq mi (568.36/km^{2})
- Time zone: UTC−05:00 (Eastern (EST))
  - Summer (DST): UTC−04:00 (EDT)
- Area code: 908
- FIPS code: 34-55895
- GNIS feature ID: 02584015

Panther Valley is an unincorporated community and census-designated place (CDP) located within Allamuchy Township, in Warren County, in the U.S. state of New Jersey. As of the 2020 census, Panther Valley had a population of 4,391.

Panther Valley was part of the Allamuchy-Panther Valley CDP at the 2000 United States census. As of the 2010 Census, the CDP was split into Allamuchy CDP and Panther Valley.

== Geography ==
According to the U.S. Census Bureau, Panther Valley had a total area of 2.978 square miles (7.713 km^{2}), including 2.964 square miles (7.676 km^{2}) of land and 0.014 square miles (0.037 km^{2}) of water (0.48%).

== Demographics ==
Historical population
Census	Pop.	Note	%±
2010	3,327		—
2020	4,391		32.0%
U.S. Decennial Census; 2010 2020

Panther Valley first appeared as a census designated place in the 2010 U.S. census formed from part of the deleted Allamuchy-Panther Valley CDP.

=== Racial and ethnic composition ===
Panther Valley CDP, New Jersey – Racial and ethnic composition Note: the US Census treats Hispanic/Latino as an ethnic category. This table excludes Latinos from the racial categories and assigns them to a separate category. Hispanics/Latinos may be of any race.
Race / Ethnicity (NH = Non-Hispanic)	Pop 2010	Pop 2020	% 2010	% 2020
White alone (NH)	2,964	3,486	89.09%	79.39%
Black or African American alone (NH)	65	221	1.95%	5.03%
Native American or Alaska Native alone (NH)	2	3	0.06%	0.07%
Asian alone (NH)	103	156	3.10%	3.55%
Native Hawaiian or Pacific Islander alone (NH)	0	0	0.00%	0.00%
Other race alone (NH)	4	25	0.12%	0.57%
Mixed race or Multiracial (NH)	42	126	1.26%	2.87%
Hispanic or Latino (any race)	147	374	4.42%	8.52%
Total	3,327	4,391	100.00%	100.00%

=== 2020 census ===
As of the 2020 census, Panther Valley had a population of 4,391. The median age was 49.6 years. 16.3% of residents were under the age of 18 and 24.2% of residents were 65 years of age or older. For every 100 females there were 83.3 males, and for every 100 females age 18 and over there were 76.8 males age 18 and over.

97.4% of residents lived in urban areas, while 2.6% lived in rural areas.

There were 2,034 households in Panther Valley, of which 22.0% had children under the age of 18 living in them. Of all households, 47.3% were married-couple households, 12.8% were households with a male householder and no spouse or partner present, and 34.5% were households with a female householder and no spouse or partner present. About 34.7% of all households were made up of individuals and 14.2% had someone living alone who was 65 years of age or older.

There were 2,117 housing units, of which 3.9% were vacant. The homeowner vacancy rate was 1.2% and the rental vacancy rate was 1.0%.

=== 2010 census ===
The 2010 United States census counted 3,327 people, 1,604 households, and 934 families in the CDP. The population density was 1,122.6 per square mile (433.4/km^{2}). There were 1,710 housing units at an average density of 577.0 per square mile (222.8/km^{2}). The racial makeup was 92.64% (3,082) White, 1.98% (66) Black or African American, 0.09% (3) Native American, 3.10% (103) Asian, 0.00% (0) Pacific Islander, 0.48% (16) from other races, and 1.71% (57) from two or more races. Hispanic or Latino of any race were 4.42% (147) of the population.

Of the 1,604 households, 20.0% had children under the age of 18; 46.7% were married couples living together; 8.5% had a female householder with no husband present and 41.8% were non-families. Of all households, 34.9% were made up of individuals and 12.2% had someone living alone who was 65 years of age or older. The average household size was 2.07 and the average family size was 2.69.

16.7% of the population were under the age of 18, 4.5% from 18 to 24, 26.7% from 25 to 44, 32.9% from 45 to 64, and 19.3% who were 65 years of age or older. The median age was 46.8 years. For every 100 females, the population had 86.9 males. For every 100 females ages 18 and older there were 81.7 males.

== Notable people ==
People who were born in, residents of, or otherwise closely associated with Panther Valley include:

- Ada Lunardoni (1911–2003), artistic gymnast who competed in the gymnastics competition at the 1936 Summer Olympics
