= Ada Lunardoni =

American gymnast

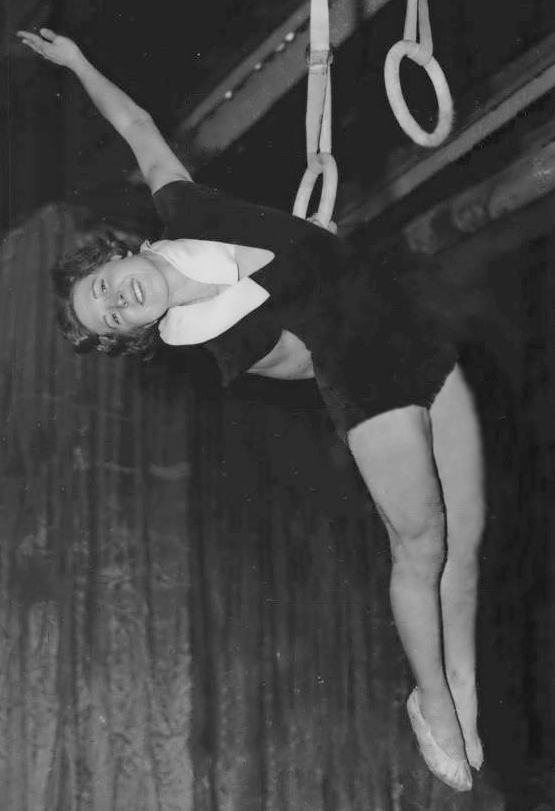
- Lunardoni in 1936

Personal information
- Born: March 8, 1911 West Hoboken, New Jersey, U.S.
- Died: January 11, 2003 (aged 91) Hackettstown, New Jersey, U.S.

Sport
- Sport: Artistic gymnastics

Ada Lunardoni (later Cumiskey, then Hutcheon; March 8, 1911 – January 11, 2003) was an American artistic gymnast. She competed in the gymnastics competition at the 1936 Summer Olympics, the first time American women competed in the sport, and placed fifth with the team.

She was born in 1911 in West Hoboken, New Jersey, which is now part of Union City. Lunardoni married fellow gymnast Frank Cumiskey after the 1936 Summer Olympics and had three children with him while living in Rockleigh, New Jersey, but the marriage did not last. She then remarried and lived the rest of her life in New Jersey.

She married Gordon Hutcheon and was a resident of the Panther Valley section of Allamuchy Township, New Jersey.

A play called Turning about Lunardoni and other members of the 1936 women's team was performed in 2018.
