= Smith Clove Meetinghouse =

Historic meetinghouse in New York, United States

- U.S. National Register of Historic Places
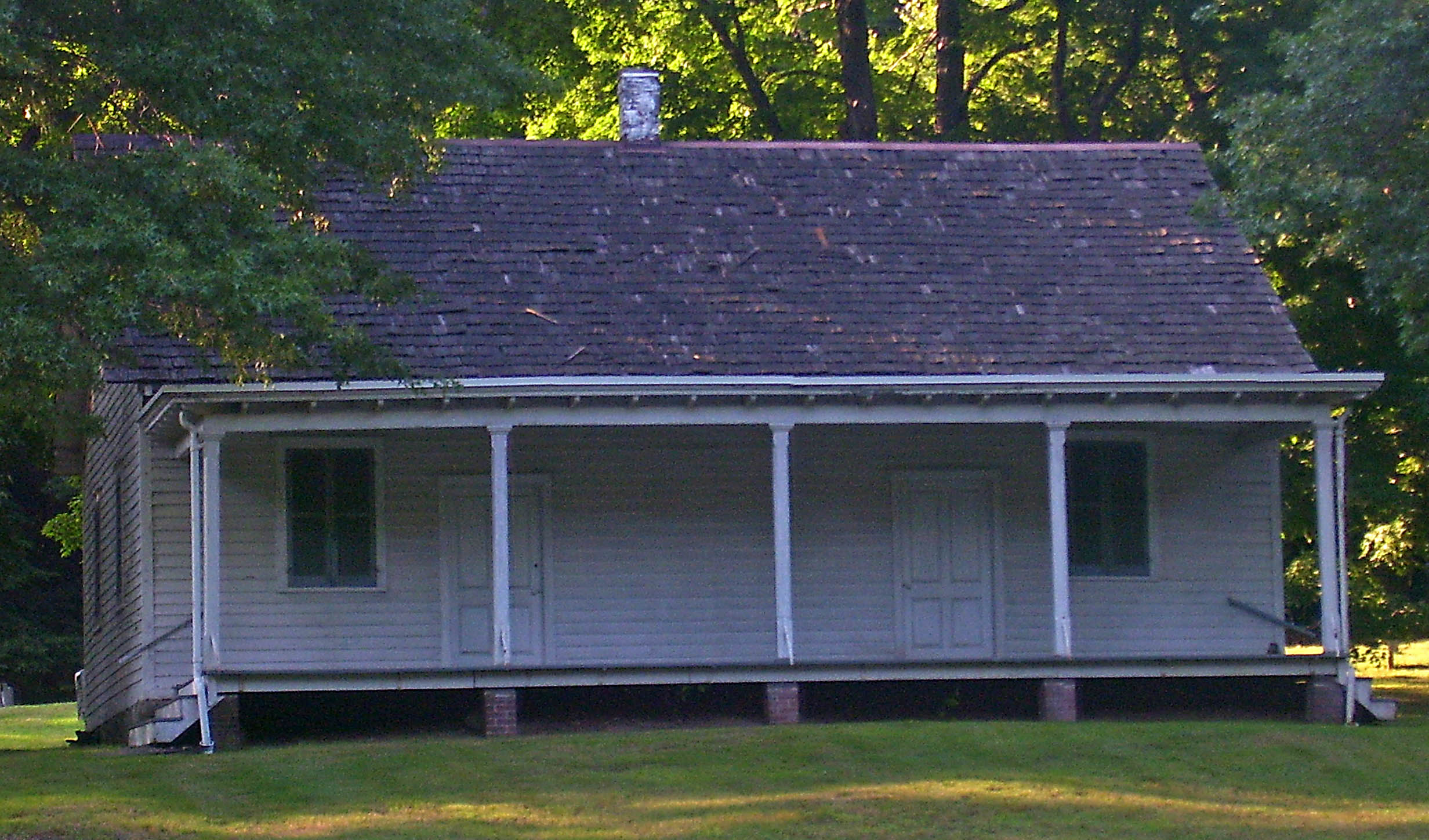
- Front (south) elevation in 2007
- Location: Highland Mills, New York
- Nearest city: Newburgh
- Coordinates: 41°21′40″N 74°06′41″W
- Area: 2 acres (8,100 m^{2})
- Built: 1803
- NRHP reference No.: 74001290
- Added to NRHP: 1974

The Smith Clove Meeting House is a Quaker place of worship in Highland Mills, New York, United States, a short distance from NY 32 on Smith Clove Road. It is the oldest religious building in the town and village of Woodbury, dating to the beginning of the 19th century, and is still used by the nearby Cornwall Quakers for meetings at least once a year.

While modified and renovated in the mid-19th century, its design still reflects its era of Quaker practice. It was added to the National Register of Historic Places in 1974.

== Building ==
The meetinghouse sits in the middle of a two-acre (8,100 m^{2}) lot, gently sloping uphill westward. The land is mostly open with several large trees, and some smaller ones that shade the meeting house. A small burial ground for early members of the meeting is located just to the north.

It is a one-and-a-half-story four-by-two-bay clapboard-sided frame house supported by a fieldstone foundation. The gabled, wood-shingled roof is pierced by a central chimney.

A porch runs the length of the south-facing front facade. The entrances are on either end, with an accompanying window, reflecting a contemporary Quaker practice of holding separate meetings for men and women. There are two other windows on the east and west elevations. A small privy is attached to the rear elevation.

The interior consists of a sparely finished meeting room, with removable wooden partition. The walls are painted plaster, the flooring is wide wooden planks. The furniture consists of simple wooden benches and two wood-burning stoves.

== History ==
The Smith Clove meeting began in 1790 as a preparative meeting under the Cornwall meeting, a few miles to the north. They met in a member's home until the need for a separate meeting house became apparent after a decade, and the land for the current meeting house was purchased in 1801. The name Smith Clove came from the original landowner of the area from the Cheesecocks Patent, William Smith, and the Dutch term kloof, for a steep, narrow valley such as the one in which Highland Mills is located, between Schunemunk Mountain and the Hudson Highlands, where Woodbury Creek flows.

The members built the house themselves, it is believed, and it was complete and in use by 1803. To avoid the possible confiscation of the land, which had happened to some Quaker meetings in the area before the Revolution, several of the member families held title to the land rather than the meeting itself.

In the middle of the 19th century, the meeting house was renovated. Most of the building and the original interior were kept. The clapboard siding matches the wide planks used in other Quaker meeting houses ca. 1800, but may have been replaced at this time as well. In 1886, with confiscation no longer a threat, title was passed to the meeting proper. Over time the Highland Mills meeting dwindled to the point that it merged back into the Cornwall meeting, which still meets in Smith Clove once a year.
