= Allamuchy Township, New Jersey =

Township in Warren County, New Jersey, US

- Township
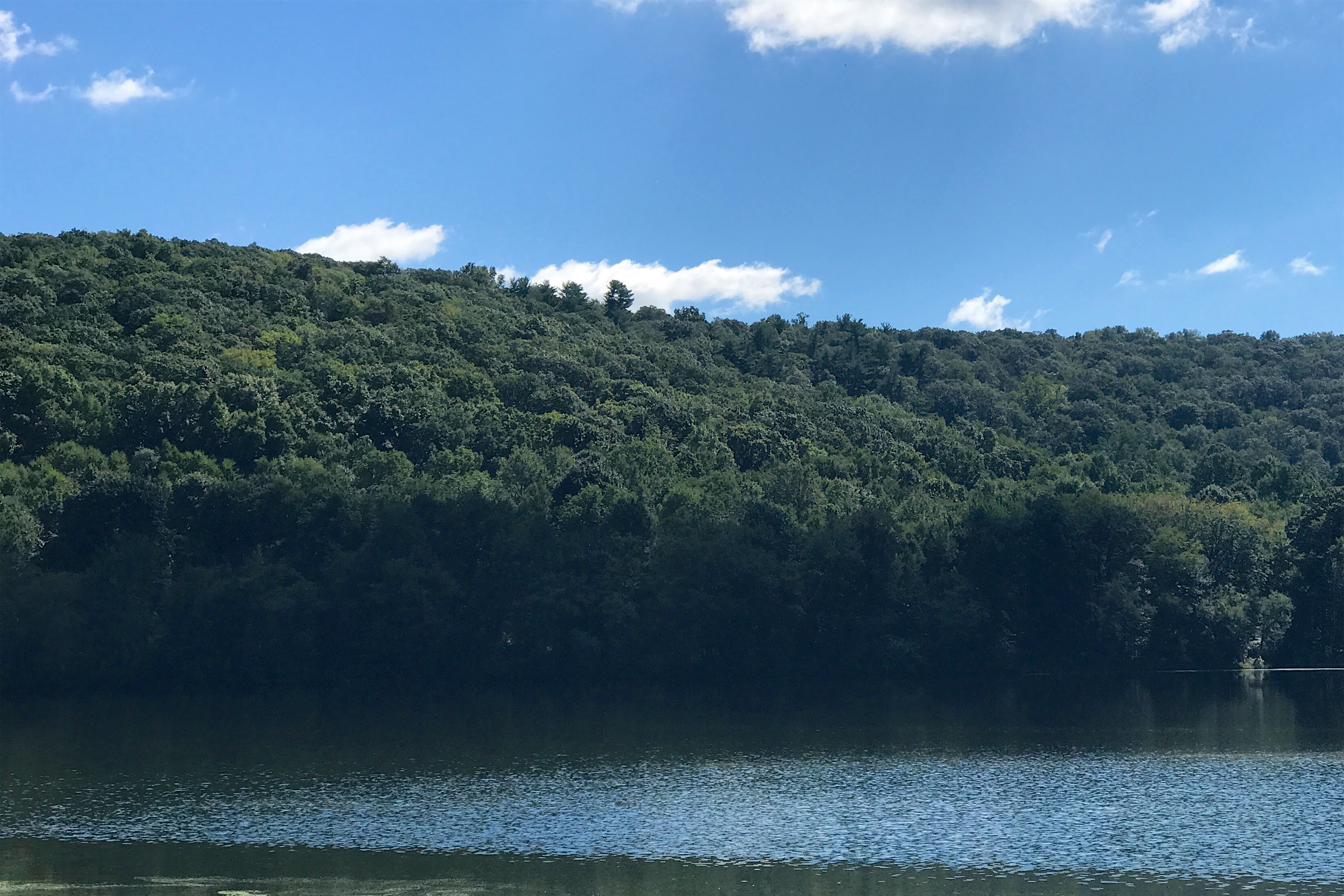
- View of Allamuchy Mountain and Allamuchy Pond from Rutherfurd Hall

- Logo

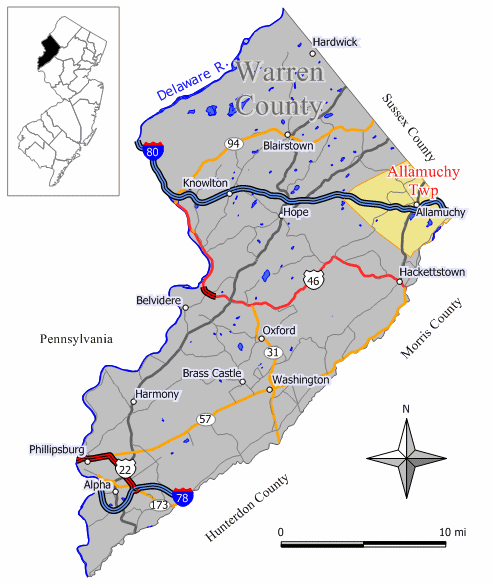
- Location of Allamuchy Township in Warren County highlighted in yellow (right). Inset map: Location of Warren County in New Jersey highlighted in black (left).

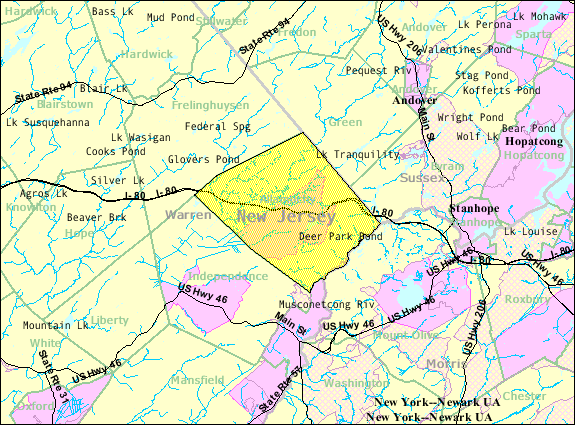
- Census Bureau map of Allamuchy Township, New Jersey

- Location in Warren County Location in New Jersey Location in the United States
- Coordinates: 40.918679°N 74.828973°W
- Country: United States
- State: New Jersey
- County: Warren
- Incorporated: April 4, 1873
- Named after: Native American word "Allamachetey" ("place within the hills")

Government
  - Type: Faulkner Act (small municipality)
  - Body: Township Committee
  - Mayor: Rosemary Tuohy (R, term ends December 31, 2028)
  - Municipal Clerk: Anne Marie Tracy

Area
  - Total: 20.27 sq mi (52.51 km^{2})
  - Land: 19.99 sq mi (51.78 km^{2})
  - Water: 0.28 sq mi (0.73 km^{2}) 1.39%
  - Rank: 142nd of 565 in state 9th of 22 in county
- Elevation: 623 ft (190 m)

Population (2020)
  - Total: 5,335
  - Estimate (2023): 5,446
  - Rank: 368th of 565 in state 10th of 22 in county
  - Density: 266.9/sq mi (103.1/km^{2})
  - Rank: 485th of 565 in state 11th of 22 in county
- Time zone: UTC−05:00 (Eastern (EST))
  - Summer (DST): UTC−04:00 (Eastern (EDT))
- ZIP Code: 07820
- Area codes: 908 exchanges: 813, 852
- FIPS code: 3404100670
- GNIS feature ID: 0882243
- Website: allamuchynj.org

Allamuchy Township is a township in Warren County, in the U.S. state of New Jersey. As of the 2020 United States census, the township's population was 5,335, an increase of 1,012 (+23.4%) from the 2010 census count of 4,323, which in turn reflected an increase of 446 (+11.5%) from the 3,877 counted in the 2000 census.

Allamuchy Township was incorporated as a township by an act of the New Jersey Legislature on April 4, 1873, from portions of Independence Township. The township's name comes from the Native American word "Allamachetey", meaning "place within the hills".

== Geography ==
According to the U.S. Census Bureau, the township had a total area of 20.27 square miles (52.51 km^{2}), including 19.99 square miles (51.78 km^{2}) of land and 0.28 square miles (0.73 km^{2}) of water (1.39%). The townships southeastern border is formed by the Musconetcong River.

Allamuchy CDP (with a 2010 Census population of 78) and Panther Valley (2010 population of 3,327) are census-designated places and unincorporated communities located within the township. As of the 2000 United States census, the two CDPs were consolidated as Allamuchy-Panther Valley, which had a 2000 Census population of 3,125.

Other unincorporated communities, localities and place names located partially or completely within the township include Alphano, Long Bridge, Quaker Church, Saxton Falls and Warrenville.

Allamuchy Township borders the municipalities of Frelinghuysen Township, Hackettstown and Independence Township in Warren County; Mount Olive Township in Morris County; and both Byram Township and Green Township in Sussex County.

== History ==
Prior to European settlement, what is now Allamuchy Township was inhabited for centuries by the Lenape Native Americans, until they were forced west by 1742. The Bird House Archaeological Site is located within the Township.

=== Quaker settlement ===
Acting as a surveyor, John Reading laid out a tract of land for William Penn in 1715 that became the Quaker Settlement, the first non-Native Americans to live in Allamuchy. By 1752, the Society of Friends, or Quakers, established a community in the northeast corner of what is now Allamuchy Township. The settlement was chartered in Kingwood, NJ, and the first Quakers to arrive in Allamuchy brought with them the materials to build their homes. The land controlled by the Quaker Settlement spanned an area not just in Allamuchy, but what is now considered Green Township, NJ as well. This settlement was known as the "Hardwick Friends," because what is now Allamuchy Township was then a part of Hardwick Township.

In 1735, Quakers selected a plot of land for use as a burying ground with accompanying stone wall and first constructed a wood meeting house in 1752, replacing it in 1764 with a stone building. The Hardwick Meeting sided with a branch of the Society of Friends known as the Hicksites in 1827, an event that compelled many of the Settlement's residents to leave for other Quaker communities. On February 2, 1854, the last Quaker meeting took place in the Settlement; it was formally dissolved in 1855. The Friends' Burying Ground was used until 1918, when its stone wall was repaired and a small monument installed; it was later restored in 1940.

The location of the Quaker meeting house was later used as a public school. There, in Fall 1921, the Quaker Grove School served as an experimental research station for rural education by researchers Fannie W. Dunn and Maria A. Everett from Teachers College, Columbia University. The result of their fieldwork was the book, Four Years in a County School, which detailed their findings with regards to the single-teacher model, curriculum, and observations about rural education in general. In 1940, the Township consolidated its four public schools into a single location, the present-day Allamuchy Township School, and the Quaker Grove school reverted to private ownership.

=== Grand estates ===
In the late 1700s, John Rutherfurd began construction of his vast home in Allamuchy. Lewis Morris Rutherfurd later occupied the estate, where he took the first telescopic photographs of the Moon from his home at Tranquility Farms in 1865. His son, Rutherfurd Stuyvesant, raised Holstein cattle, Dorset sheep, English pheasants and hunting dogs on the estate, which included a 1,000-acre (400 ha) deer preserve. Under Rutherfurd Stuyvesant, the 47-room house was known as the Stuyvesant Mansion, and was decorated with imported and Duncan Phyfe furniture, Ming Dynasty pottery, and 15th and 16th century suits of armor. The Stuyvesant Mansion was last occupied in 1947 and its contents sold in 1951 and 1955. The Mansion was destroyed by fire in September 1959.

Winthrop Rutherfurd commissioned Whitney Warren, architect of Grand Central Terminal, in 1902 to design Rutherfurd Hall. Completed in 1906, the Hall served as a hunting lodge family residence where prominent guests could be entertained, most famously U.S. president Franklin D. Roosevelt who was a close friend of Winthrop's second wife Lucy.

The eponymous family later gave Rutherfurd Hall to the Catholic Church in 1959 after the completion of Interstate 80 brought more traffic and noise to the area. The Church changed the Hall's name to Villa Madonna and used it as a convent for an order of nuns for five decades before selling it the town to be used as a museum and community education facility. Now listed on the National Historic Register, Rutherfurd Hall first opened to the public in 2012.

The Panther Ledge Farms estate was owned by Clendenin J. Ryan, former secretary to New York Mayor Fiorello La Guardia and politician who later ran an unsuccessful campaign for New Jersey Governor in the 1953 election. Ryan's estate acquired this name due to a rock bluff on the property, where local legend holds as the location the last mountain lion was hunted in the state. Panther Ledge Farms featured a private zoo, pheasant hatchery, helicopter, greenhouse, bloodhound kennel, and a collection of paintings Ryan bought from William Randolph Hearst.

In 1972, a left-wing group called the Allamuchy Tribe, led by activists Rennie Davis and Jerry Rubin and funded by ex-Beatle John Lennon, met at the Peter Stuyvesant Farm in Allamuchy to organize protests against the 1972 Republican National Convention. FBI surveillance of the Allamuchy Tribe led to the bureau putting pressure on Lennon to divest from political activity by threatening to deport him.

== Demographics ==
Historical population
Census	Pop.	Note	%±
1880	648		—
1890	759		17.1%
1900	588		−22.5%
1910	642		9.2%
1920	556		−13.4%
1930	684		23.0%
1940	686		0.3%
1950	736		7.3%
1960	973		32.2%
1970	1,138		17.0%
1980	2,560		125.0%
1990	3,484		36.1%
2000	3,877		11.3%
2010	4,323		11.5%
2020	5,335		23.4%
2023 (est.)	5,446	▲	2.1%
Population sources: 1880–1920 1880–1890; 1890–1910 1910–1930; 1940–2000 2000; 2010 2020

The township, and all of Warren County, is part of the Allentown-Bethlehem-Easton, PA-NJ Metropolitan Statistical Area.

=== 2010 census ===
The 2010 United States census counted 4,323 people, 1,953 households, and 1,213 families in the township. The population density was 211.3 per square mile (81.6/km^{2}). There were 2,096 housing units at an average density of 102.5 per square mile (39.6/km^{2}). The racial makeup was 93.45% (4,040) White, 1.78% (77) Black or African American, 0.14% (6) Native American, 2.73% (118) Asian, 0.02% (1) Pacific Islander, 0.39% (17) from other races, and 1.48% (64) from two or more races. Hispanic or Latino of any race were 4.49% (194) of the population.

Of the 1,953 households, 22.9% had children under the age of 18; 50.7% were married couples living together; 8.0% had a female householder with no husband present and 37.9% were non-families. Of all households, 31.4% were made up of individuals and 11.2% had someone living alone who was 65 years of age or older. The average household size was 2.21 and the average family size was 2.80.

18.5% of the population were under the age of 18, 5.0% from 18 to 24, 25.4% from 25 to 44, 33.6% from 45 to 64, and 17.5% who were 65 years of age or older. The median age was 45.8 years. For every 100 females, the population had 90.9 males. For every 100 females ages 18 and older there were 85.5 males.

The Census Bureau's 2006-2010 American Community Survey showed that (in 2010 inflation-adjusted dollars) median household income was $82,781 (with a margin of error of +/- $5,051) and the median family income was $104,601 (+/- $18,824). Males had a median income of $76,467 (+/- $14,328) versus $55,625 (+/- $6,142) for females. The per capita income for the borough was $49,834 (+/- $4,833). About 0.9% of families and 2.6% of the population were below the poverty line, including 4.8% of those under age 18 and 4.6% of those age 65 or over.

=== 2000 census ===
As of the 2000 United States census there were 3,877 people, 1,692 households, and 1,133 families residing in the township. The population density was 188.8 inhabitants per square mile (72.9/km^{2}). There were 1,774 housing units at an average density of 86.4 per square mile (33.4/km^{2}). The racial makeup of the township was 95.49% White, 0.93% African American, 0.05% Native American, 1.86% Asian, 0.70% from other races, and 0.98% from two or more races. Hispanic or Latino of any race were 2.68% of the population.

There were 1,692 households out of which 23.4% had children under the age of 18 living with them, 57.7% were married couples living together, 7.2% had a female householder with no husband present, and 33.0% were non-families. 28.5% of all households were made up of individuals and 9.2% had someone living alone who was 65 years of age or older. The average household size was 2.28 and the average family size was 2.80.

In the township the population was spread out with 19.0% under the age of 18, 4.4% from 18 to 24, 28.4% from 25 to 44, 31.9% from 45 to 64, and 16.4% who were 65 years of age or older. The median age was 44 years. For every 100 females there were 86.7 males. For every 100 females age 18 and over, there were 85.6 males.

The median income for a household in the township was $70,107, and the median income for a family was $89,653. Males had a median income of $54,743 versus $41,782 for females. The per capita income for the township was $43,552. About 0.3% of families and 1.8% of the population were below the poverty line, including 0.6% of those under age 18 and 3.2% of those age 65 or over.

== Culture and tourism ==
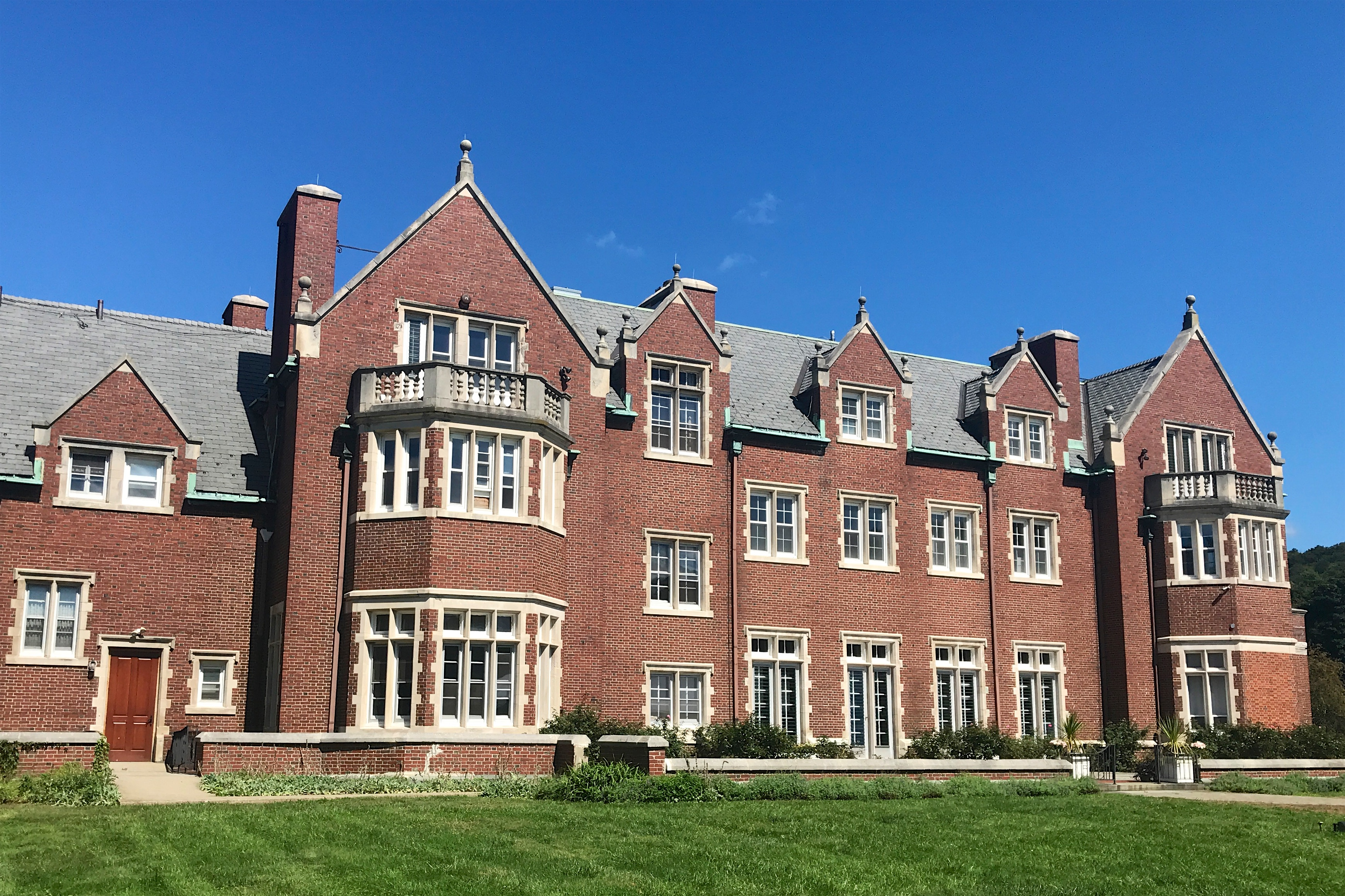
Rutherfurd Hall

Rutherfurd Hall is a cultural center and museum that provides educational and enrichment opportunities for the residents of Allamuchy, the surrounding communities, and the greater New York – New Jersey Highlands region at large. It conducts and hosts public programs including: 4th of July Fireworks, Hall of Haunts, Scouting, Teas & Talks, etiquette courses, lectures, concerts, specialty summer camps and weddings. A family seat for the decedents of Walter Rutherfurd and Senator John Rutherfurd, Rutherfurd Hall was designed by Whitney Warren and the Olmsted Brothers and was added to the National Register of Historic Places in 2013.

The north end of Shades of Death Road, a dark tourism "haunted highway" known by readers of Weird NJ magazine for the legends and folklore inspired by its macabre name, runs through Allamuchy.

== Government ==
=== Local government ===
Allamuchy Township is governed under the Small Municipality form of government. The Faulkner Act, formally known as the Optional Municipal Charter Law, allows municipalities to adopt a Small Municipality form of government only for municipalities with a population of under 12,000 at the time of adoption. The township is one of 18 municipalities (of the 564) statewide that use this form of government. The governing body is comprised of the Mayor and the four-member Township Council, with all positions elected at-large on a partisan basis as part of the November general election. The Mayor is elected directly by the voters to a three-year term of office. Council members serve a term of three years, which are staggered so that two seats come up for election in the first two years of a three-year cycle and the mayoral seat is up for direct vote in the third year.

As of 2026, the Mayor of Allamuchy Township is Republican Rosemary Tuohy, whose term of office ends December 31, 2028. Members of the Allamuchy Township Committee are Council President Deborah Bonanno (R, 2026), Suzanne Chamberlin (R, 2026), Ed Fabula (R, 2028) and Manuel P. "Manny" Quinoa (R, 2028).

In January 2022, Deborah Bonano was appointed from a list of three names nominated by the Republican municipal committee to fill the seat expiring in December 2023 that became vacant when Rosemary Tuohy stepped down to take office as mayor.

The seat expiring in December 2022 that had been held by Douglas A. Ochwat was filled by Ed Fabula.

In January 2016, the Township Committee selected former mayor Betty Schultheis from three candidates nominated by the Republican municipal committee to fill the seat expiring in December 2017 that had been held by Keith DeTombeur until he stepped down to take office as mayor; Schultheis will serve on an interim basis until the November 2016 election, when voters will select a candidate to serve the balance of the term of office.

=== Federal, state, and county representation ===
Allamuchy Township is located in the 7th congressional district and is part of New Jersey's 24th state legislative district.

For the 119th United States Congress, New Jersey's 7th congressional district is represented by Thomas Kean Jr. (R, Westfield). New Jersey is represented in the United States Senate by Democrats Cory Booker (Newark, term ends 2027) and Andy Kim (Moorestown, term ends 2031).

For the 2026–2027 session, the 24th legislative district of the New Jersey Legislature is represented in the State Senate by Parker Space (R, Wantage Township) and in the General Assembly by Dawn Fantasia (R, Franklin) and Mike Inganamort (R, Chester Township).

Warren County is governed by a three-member Board of County Commissioners, who are chosen at-large on a staggered basis in partisan elections with one seat coming up for election each year as part of the November general election. At an annual reorganization meeting held in the beginning of January, the board selects one of its members to serve as Commissioner Director and other as Deputy Director. As of 2025, Warren County's Commissioners are:

Deputy Director Jason J. Sarnoski (R, Lopatcong Township; 2025), Lori Ciesla (R, Lopatcong Township; 2026), and Director James R. Kern III (R, Pohatcong Township; 2027).

Constitutional officers of Warren County are: Clerk Holly Mackey (R, Alpha; 2027), Sheriff James McDonald Sr. (R, Phillipsburg; 2025) and Surrogate Michael J. Doherty (R, Washington; 2025).

=== Politics ===
As of March 2011, there was a total of 3,197 registered voters in Allamuchy Township, of whom 529 (16.5% vs. 21.5% countywide) were registered as Democrats, 1,253 (39.2% vs. 35.3%) were registered as Republicans, and 1,413 (44.2% vs. 43.1%) were registered as Unaffiliated. There were two voters registered as either Libertarians or Greens. Among the township's 2010 Census population, 74.0% (vs. 62.3% in Warren County) were registered to vote, including 90.7% of those ages 18 and over (vs. 81.5% countywide).

Gubernatorial election results for Allamuchy Township
Year	Republican		Democratic		Third party(ies)	
Year	No.	%	No.	%	No.	%
2025	1,500	56.52%	1,140	42.95%	14	0.53%
2021	1,425	63.31%	811	36.03%	15	0.67%
2017	937	61.00%	555	36.13%	44	2.86%
2013	1,045	74.27%	342	24.31%	20	1.42%
2009	1,111	66.41%	406	24.27%	156	9.32%
2005	865	63.46%	458	33.60%	40	2.93%

In the 2012 presidential election, Republican Mitt Romney received 62.2% of the vote (1,489 cast), ahead of Democrat Barack Obama with 36.3% (868 votes), and other candidates with 1.5% (35 votes), among the 2,431 ballots cast by the township's 3,328 registered voters (39 ballots were spoiled), for a turnout of 73.0%.

United States presidential election results for Allamuchy Township
Year	Republican		Democratic		Third party(ies)	
Year	No.	%	No.	%	No.	%
2024	1,956	57.46%	1,390	40.83%	58	1.70%
2020	1,933	56.06%	1,470	42.63%	45	1.31%
2016	1,550	60.88%	917	36.02%	79	3.10%
2012	1,489	62.25%	868	36.29%	35	1.46%
2008	1,445	60.69%	911	38.26%	25	1.05%
2004	1,442	65.25%	746	33.76%	22	1.00%

In the 2013 gubernatorial election, Republican Chris Christie received 74.3% of the vote (1,045 cast), ahead of Democrat Barbara Buono with 24.3% (342 votes), and other candidates with 1.4% (20 votes), among the 1,433 ballots cast by the township's 3,426 registered voters (26 ballots were spoiled), for a turnout of 41.8%.

United States Senate election results for Allamuchy Township1
Year	Republican		Democratic		Third party(ies)	
Year	No.	%	No.	%	No.	%
2024	1,902	57.22%	1,364	41.03%	58	1.74%
2018	1,361	60.09%	823	36.34%	81	3.58%
2012	1,419	62.07%	836	36.57%	31	1.36%
2006	874	62.88%	482	34.68%	34	2.45%

United States Senate election results for Allamuchy Township2
Year	Republican		Democratic		Third party(ies)	
Year	No.	%	No.	%	No.	%
2020	1,943	57.25%	1,395	41.10%	56	1.65%
2014	778	61.50%	456	36.05%	31	2.45%
2013	619	64.35%	338	35.14%	5	0.52%
2008	1,446	63.84%	793	35.01%	26	1.15%

== Education ==
Public school students in pre-kindergarten through eighth grade are served by the Allamuchy Township School District. As of the 2020–21 school year, the district, comprised of two schools, had an enrollment of 421 students and 32.8 classroom teachers (on an FTE basis), for a student–teacher ratio of 12.8:1. Schools in the district (with 2020–21 enrollment data from the National Center for Education Statistics) are Mountain Villa School with 134 students in pre-Kindergarten through second grade and Allamuchy Township School with 287 students in third through eighth grade.

Students in public school for ninth through twelfth grades attend Hackettstown High School which serves students from Hackettstown, as well as students from the townships of Allamuchy, Independence and Liberty, as part of sending/receiving relationships with the Hackettstown School District. As of the 2020–21 school year, the high school had an enrollment of 864 students and 69.5 classroom teachers (on an FTE basis), for a student–teacher ratio of 12.4:1.

Students from the township and from all of Warren County are eligible to attend Ridge and Valley Charter School in Blairstown (for grades K–8) or Warren County Technical School in Washington borough (for 9–12), with special education services provided by local districts supplemented throughout the county by the Warren County Special Services School District in Oxford Township (for Pre-K–12).

== Transportation ==
=== Roads and highways ===
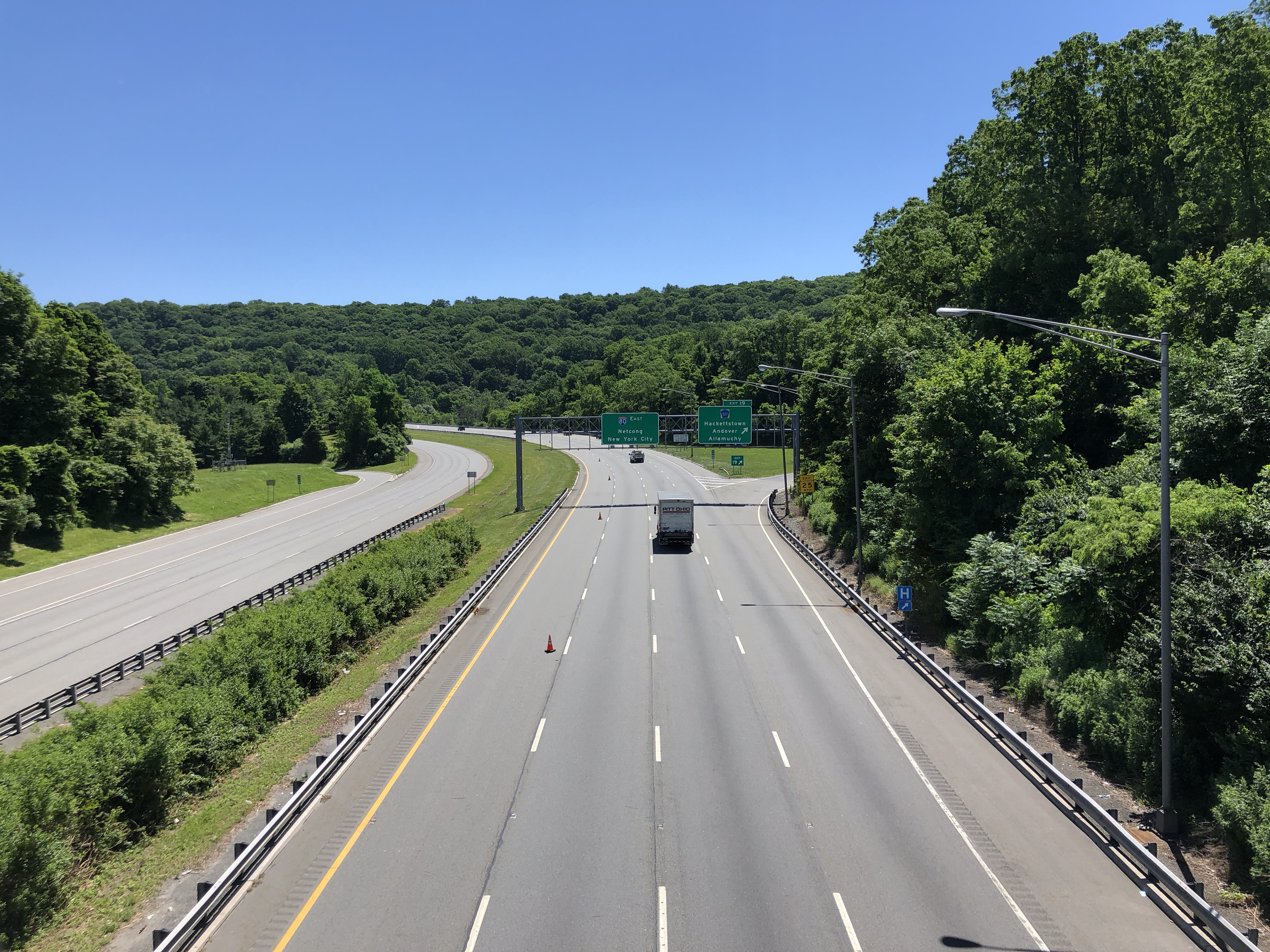
View east along Interstate 80 in Allamuchy Township

As of May 2010, the township had a total of 36.90 miles (59.38 km) of roadways, of which 10.59 miles (17.04 km) were maintained by the municipality, 19.49 miles (31.37 km) by Warren County and 6.82 miles (10.98 km) by the New Jersey Department of Transportation.

Interstate 80 crosses Allamuchy Township, and is accessible at Exit 19, County Route 517.

=== Public transportation ===
Allamuchy Township was formerly served by the Allamuchy Train Station and Allamuchy Freight House until passenger service on the Lehigh and Hudson River Railway was ended in 1933. The Allamuchy Freight House is listed on the National Historic Register of Historic Places.

=== Morris Canal ===
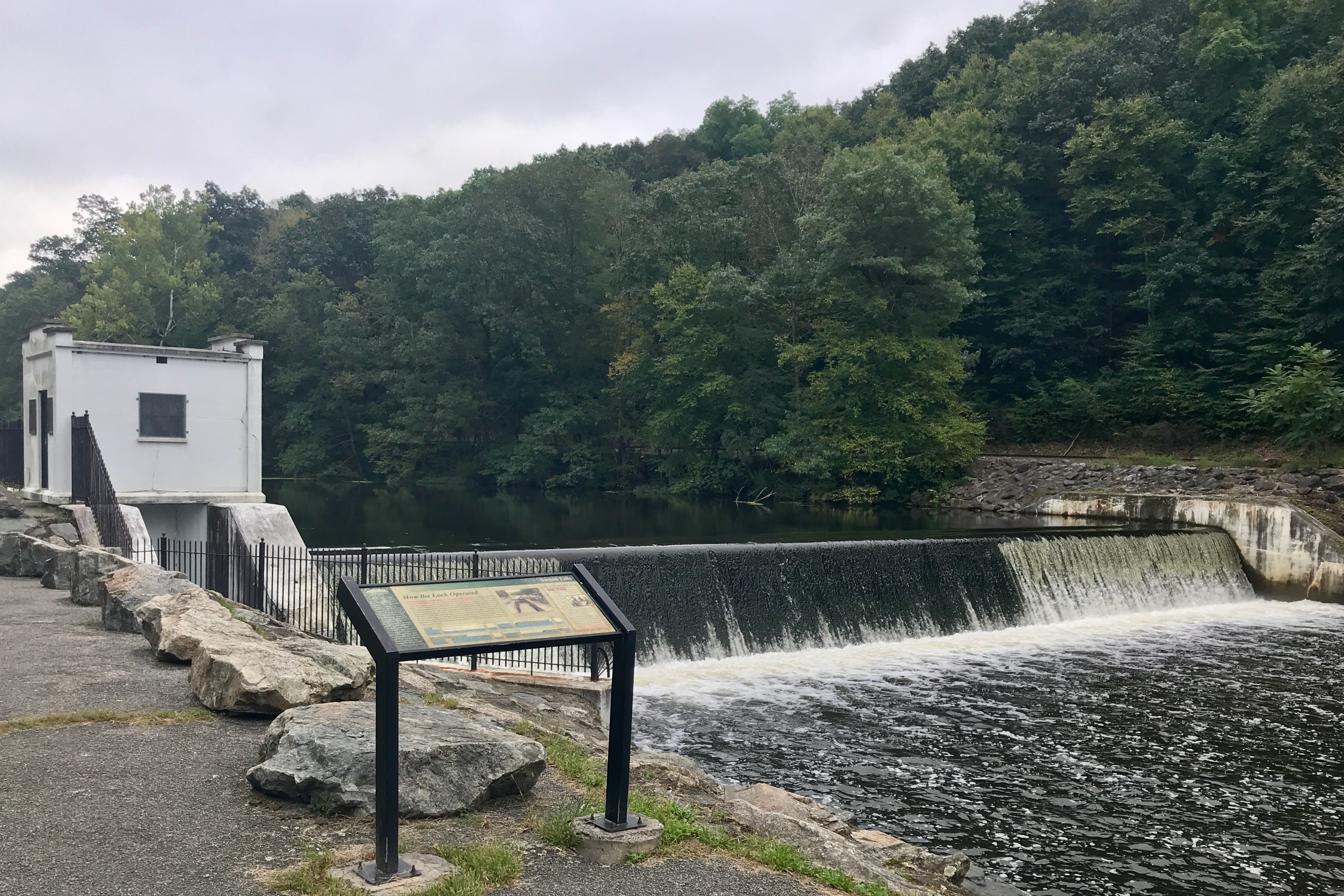
Saxton Falls Dam on the Musconetcong River, built for the Morris Canal

Between 1831 and 1924, the Morris Canal connected the coal industry of the Lehigh Valley at Phillipsburg to New York Harbor via Newark and Jersey City. The Saxton Falls Dam Complex in Allamuchy along the Musconetcong River was selected for eligibility to the New Jersey Register of Historic Places in 1993.

== Notable people ==
People who were born in, residents of, or otherwise closely associated with Allamuchy Township include:

- Alison Becker (born 1977), actress
- Stephen Bienko (born 1979), entrepreneur behind the College Hunks Hauling Junk brand
- Ada Lunardoni (1911–2003), artistic gymnast who competed in the gymnastics competition at the 1936 Summer Olympics
- Lucy Mercer Rutherfurd (1891–1948), lived in what is now Rutherfurd Hall where President Franklin D. Roosevelt paid at least one call on her "as a friend" before the existence of their lifelong romantic affair was publicly revealed
- Winthrop Rutherfurd (1862–1944), socialite and husband of Lucy Mercer Rutherfurd
