= Allamuchy-Panther Valley, New Jersey =

Populated place in Warren County, New Jersey, US

- Former census-designated place
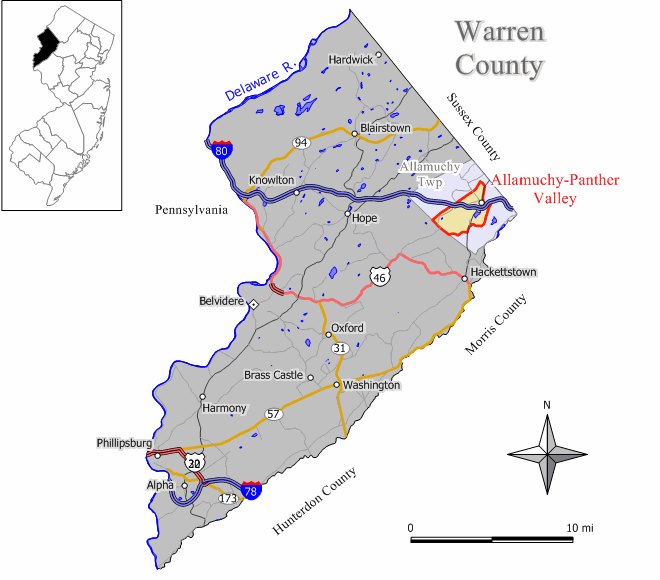
- Map of Allamuchy-Panther Valley CDP in Warren County. Inset: Location of Warren County in New Jersey.
- Coordinates: 40°54′42″N 74°49′36″W
- Country: United States
- State: New Jersey
- County: Warren

Area
  - Total: 5.8 sq mi (15.0 km^{2})
  - Land: 5.7 sq mi (14.8 km^{2})
  - Water: 0.077 sq mi (0.2 km^{2})

Population (2000 census)
  - Total: 3,125
  - Density: 547/sq mi (211.1/km^{2})
- Time zone: UTC−05:00 (Eastern (EST))
  - Summer (DST): UTC−04:00 (Eastern (EDT))
- FIPS code: 34-00675

Allamuchy-Panther Valley is an unincorporated community and former census-designated place located within Allamuchy Township, in Warren County, in the U.S. state of New Jersey. As of the 2000 United States census, the CDP's population was 3,125.

The combined CDP existed through the 2000 Census. Effective with the 2010 United States census, the CDP was split into its components, Allamuchy CDP (with a 2010 Census population of 78) and Panther Valley (2010 population of 3,327).

== Geography ==
According to the United States Census Bureau, the CDP had a total area of 15.0 km^{2} (5.8 sq mi). 14.8 km^{2} (5.7 sq mi) of land and 0.2 km^{2} (0.077 sq mi) of water (1.55%).

== Demographics ==
Historical population
Census	Pop.	Note	%±
1990	2,764		—
2000	3,125		13.1%
source: 2000

As of the 2000 United States census, there were 3,125 people, 1,430 households, and 922 families residing in the CDP. The population density was 210.9 people/km^{2} (546 people/mi^{2}). There were 1,497 housing units at an average density of 101.0 units/km^{2} (262 units/mi^{2}). The racial makeup of the CDP was 95.90% White, 0.96% African American, 0.03% Native American, 2.08% Asian, 0.51% from other races, and 0.51% from two or more races. Hispanic or Latino of any race were 2.37% of the population.

There were 1,430 households, out of which 20.8% had children under the age of 18 living with them, 55.1% were married couples living together, 7.3% had a female householder with no husband present, and 35.5% were non-families. 30.8% of all households were made up of individuals, and 9.4% had someone living alone who was 65 years of age or older. The average household size was 2.17 and the average family size was 2.70.

In the CDP the population was spread out, with 17.2% under the age of 18, 3.8% from 18 to 24, 28.1% from 25 to 44, 33.3% from 45 to 64, and 17.6% who were 65 years of age or older. The median age was 45 years. For every 100 females, there were 85.8 males. For every 100 females age 18 and over, there were 84.7 males.

The median income for a household in the CDP was $67,301, and the median income for a family was $89,303. Males had a median income of $54,732 versus $41,782 for females. The per capita income for the CDP was $45,829. About 0.3% of families and 1.6% of the population were below the poverty line, including 0.8% of those under age 18 and 2.3% of those age 65 or over.
