= Allamuchy Freight House =

- U.S. National Register of Historic Places
- New Jersey Register of Historic Places
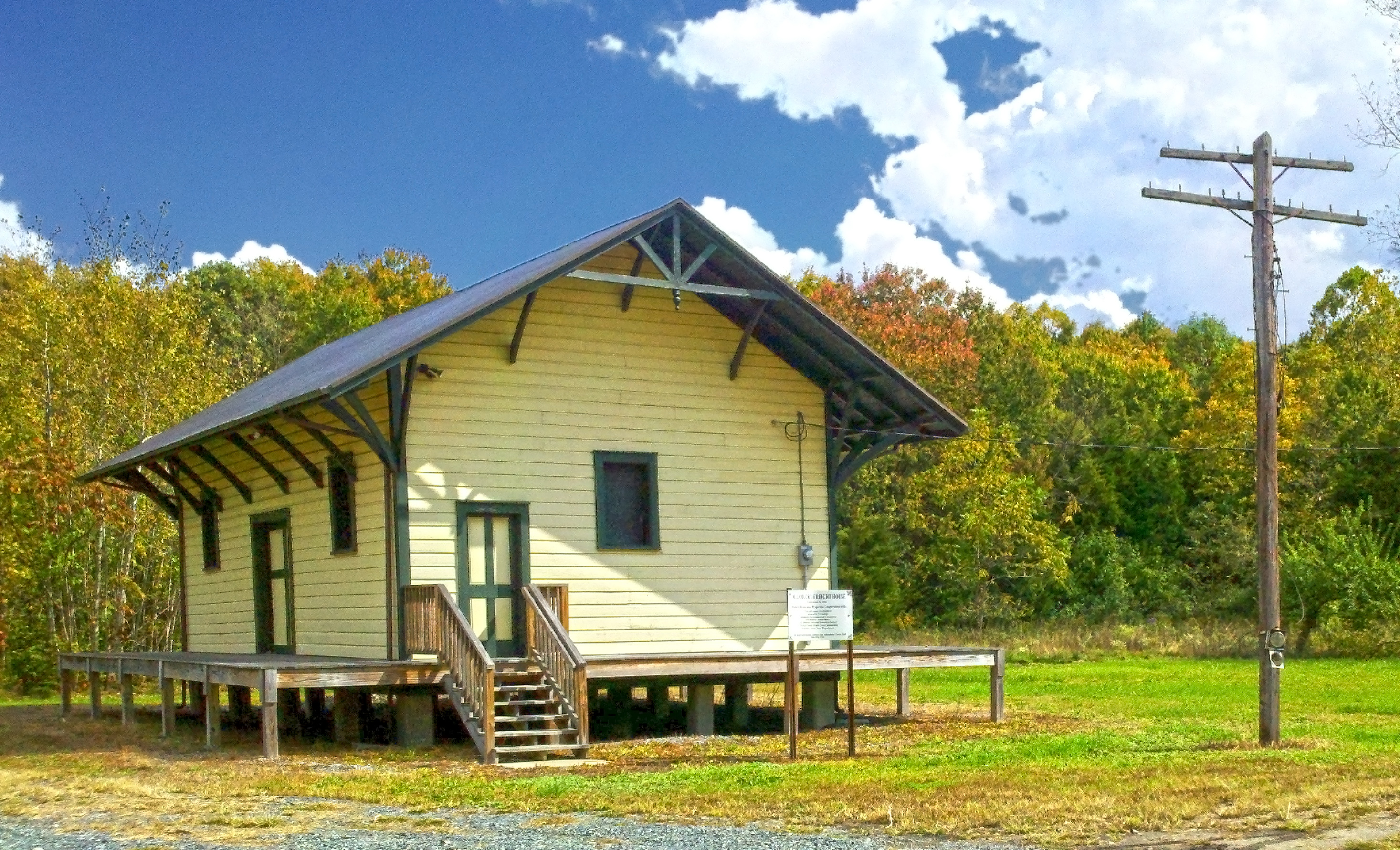

- Location within Warren County, New Jersey Location within New Jersey Location within the United States
- Location: County Route 612, Allamuchy Township, New Jersey
- Coordinates: 40.932057°N 74.820204°W
- Area: 1.3 acres (0.53 ha)
- Built: 1906
- NRHP reference No.: 02001056
- NJRHP No.: 3940

Significant dates
- Added to NRHP: September 23, 2002
- Designated NJRHP: July 22, 2002

The Allamuchy Freight House is located in Allamuchy Township of Warren County, New Jersey. This freight house was built in 1906 and was added to the National Register of Historic Places on September 23, 2002, for its significance in transportation. It was built by the Lehigh and Hudson River Railway and is the only freight house on the line still extant.

The structure is located approximately 3000 feet north of the County Route 612 (Johnsonburg Road) intersection at Alphano Road. It is roughly four miles south of the intersection of County Road 519 and County Road 617. There is a historic highway marker at the entrance to the site.

== History ==
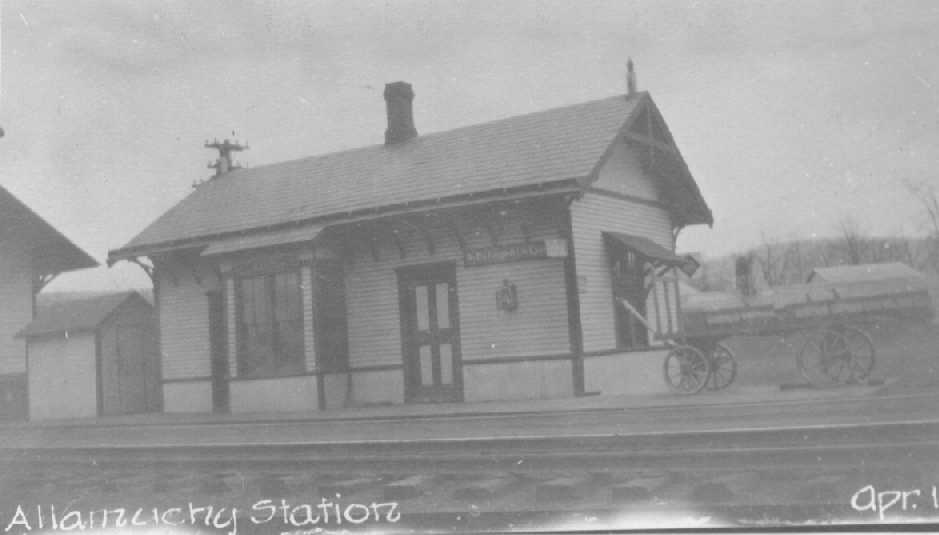
Allamuchy Station in 1918

The Lehigh and Hudson River Railway built a rail line through Allamuchy in 1882. A passenger station for Allamuchy was built in 1885 and the freight house was built in 1906. Passenger service on the rail line ended in 1933, and the passenger station was removed in 1934. Thus, the freight house became the primary railroad structure serving Allamuchy. President Franklin D. Roosevelt visited Allamuchy in 1944 via his private railway car, the Ferdinand Magellan. The Lehigh & Hudson River Railway was merged into Conrail in 1976, and the freight house was abandoned. The freight house was in severe disrepair when it was added to the National Register of Historic Places in 2002, and a project to restore the building was begun in 2004 by the New Jersey Midland Railroad Historical Society and the Allamuchy Township Environmental Committee. The project is now part of the Save America's Treasures partnership. There are also plans to rebuild the demolished passenger station building.

== See also ==
- National Register of Historic Places listings in Warren County, New Jersey
