= Allamuchy Township School District =

School district in Warren County, New Jersey, US

Address
- 20 Johnsonburg Road Allamuchy Township, Warren County, New Jersey, 07820; United States
- Coordinates: 40°55′23″N 74°48′42″W

District information
- Grades: PreK-8
- Superintendent: Melissa Sabol
- Business administrator: Danielle Tarvin
- Schools: 2

Students and staff
- Enrollment: 421 (as of 2020–21)
- Faculty: 32.8 FTEs
- Student–teacher ratio: 12.8:1

Other information
- District Factor Group: I
- Website: www.aes.k12.nj.us
Ind.	Per pupil	District spending	Rank (*)	K-8 average	%± vs. average
1A	Total Spending	$17,143	20	$18,891	−9.3%
1	Budgetary Cost	13,761	27	14,159	−2.8%
2	Classroom Instruction	7,528	9	8,659	−13.1%
6	Support Services	2,080	25	2,167	−4.0%
8	Administrative Cost	1,582	23	1,547	2.3%
10	Operations & Maintenance	2,112	58	1,612	31.0%
13	Extracurricular Activities	224	56	104	115.4%
16	Median Teacher Salary	52,530	7	61,136
Data from NJDoE 2014 Taxpayers' Guide to Education Spending. *Of K-8 districts with 401-750 students. Lowest spending=1; Highest=64

The Allamuchy Township School District is a comprehensive community public school district that serves students in pre-kindergarten through eighth grade from Allamuchy Township, in Warren County, in the U.S. state of New Jersey.

As of the 2020–21 school year, the district, comprising two schools, had an enrollment of 421 students and 32.8 classroom teachers (on an FTE basis), for a student–teacher ratio of 12.8:1.

The district is classified by the New Jersey Department of Education as being in District Factor Group "I", the second-highest of eight groupings. District Factor Groups organize districts statewide to allow comparison by common socioeconomic characteristics of the local districts. From lowest socioeconomic status to highest, the categories are A, B, CD, DE, FG, GH, I and J.

Students in public school for ninth through twelfth grades attend Hackettstown High School which serves students from Hackettstown, as well as students from the townships of Allamuchy, Independence and Liberty, as part of sending/receiving relationships with the Hackettstown School District. As of the 2020–21 school year, the high school had an enrollment of 864 students and 69.5 classroom teachers (on an FTE basis), for a student–teacher ratio of 12.4:1.

== Schools ==
Schools in the district (with 2020–21 enrollment data from the National Center for Education Statistics) are:

- Mountain Villa School with 134 students in pre-Kindergarten through second grade
  - Melissa Sabol, principal
- Allamuchy Township School with 287 students in third through eighth grade
  - Jennifer A. Gallegly, principal

== Administration ==
Core members of the districts' administration are:

- Melissa Sabol, superintendent
- Danielle Tarvin, business administrator and board secretary

== Board of education ==
The district's board of education is comprised of nine members who set policy and oversee the fiscal and educational operation of the district through its administration. As a Type II school district, the board's trustees are elected directly by voters to serve three-year terms of office on a staggered basis, with three seats up for election each year held (since 2014) as part of the November general election. The board appoints a superintendent to oversee the district's day-to-day operations and a business administrator to supervise the business functions of the district.
