= Allamuchy (CDP), New Jersey =

Populated place in Warren County, New Jersey, US

Allamuchy, New Jersey
- Census-designated place
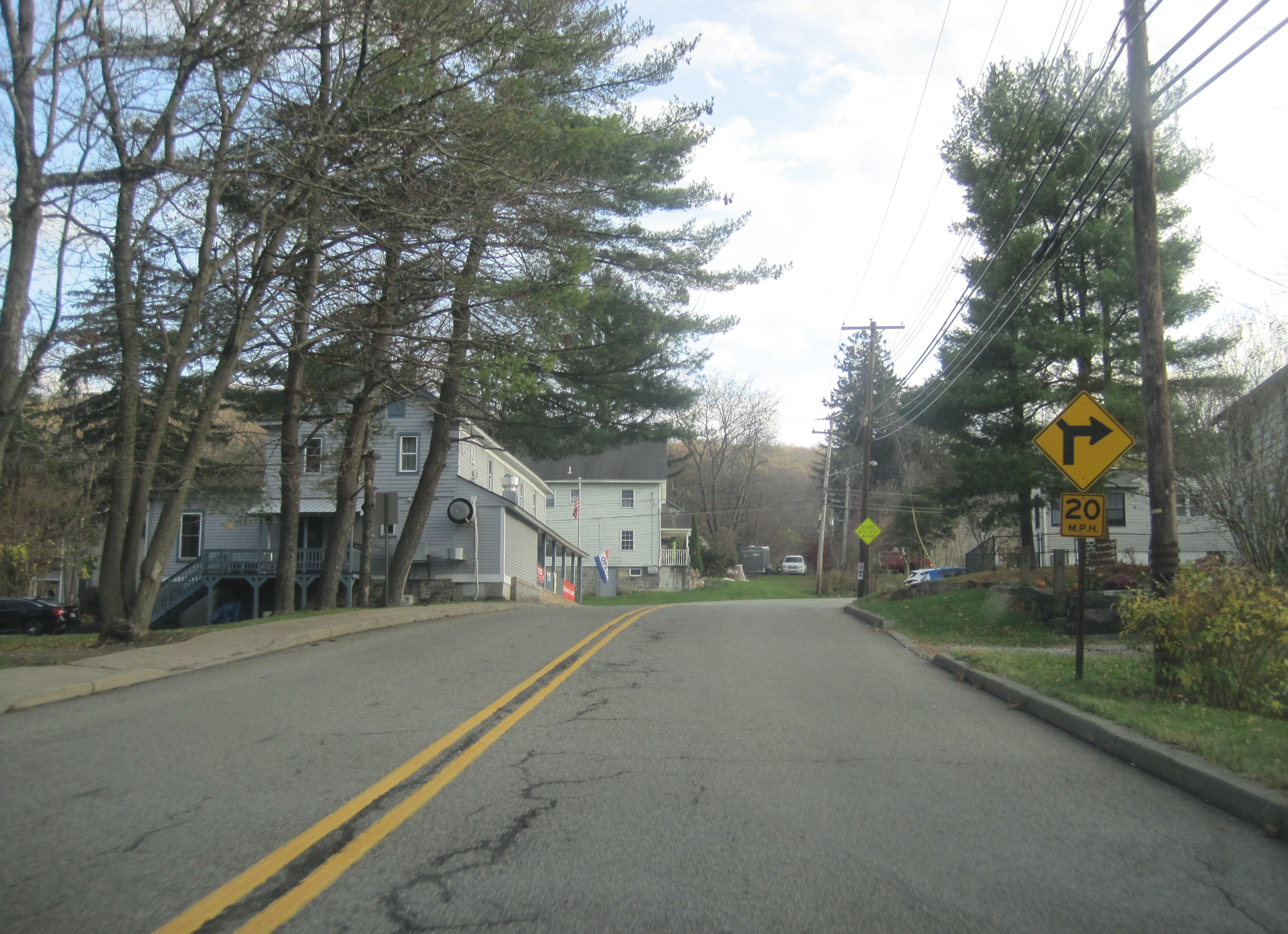
- Johnsonburg Road in Allamuchy

- Location in Warren County Location in New Jersey Location in the United States
- Coordinates: 40.922363°N 74.81256°W
- Country: United States
- State: New Jersey
- County: Warren
- Township: Allamuchy

Area
  - Total: 2.58 sq mi (6.69 km^{2})
  - Land: 2.58 sq mi (6.67 km^{2})
  - Water: 0.0039 sq mi (0.01 km^{2}) 0.68%
- Elevation: 541 ft (165 m)

Population (2020)
  - Total: 156
  - Density: 60.5/sq mi (23.37/km^{2})
- Time zone: UTC−05:00 (Eastern (EST))
  - Summer (DST): UTC−04:00 (EDT)
- ZIP Code: 07820
- Area code: 908
- FIPS code: 34-00640
- GNIS feature ID: 2583964

Allamuchy is an unincorporated community and census-designated place (CDP) located within Allamuchy Township, in Warren County, in the U.S. state of New Jersey. As of the 2020 United States census, its population was 208, an increase from the 74 counted in the 2010 census.

As of the 2000 United States census, the area of the current CDP was part of the Allamuchy-Panther Valley CDP, which had a 2000 Census population of 3,125. As of the 2010 Census, the CDP was split into Allamuchy CDP and Panther Valley (2010 population of 3,327).

== Geography ==
According to the United States Census Bureau, Allamuchy CDP had a total area of 0.082 square miles (0.211 km^{2}), including 0.081 square miles (0.209 km^{2}) of land and 0.001 square miles (0.001 km^{2}) of water (0.68%).

== Demographics ==
Historical population
Census	Pop.	Note	%±
2010	78		—
2020	156		100.0%
U.S. Decennial Census

Allamuchy first appeared as a census designated place in the 2010 U.S. census formed from part of the deleted Allamuchy-Panther Valley CDP.

=== 2020 census ===
Allamuchy CDP, New Jersey – Racial and ethnic composition Note: the US Census treats Hispanic/Latino as an ethnic category. This table excludes Latinos from the racial categories and assigns them to a separate category. Hispanics/Latinos may be of any race.
Race / Ethnicity (NH = Non-Hispanic)	Pop 2010	Pop 2020	% 2010	% 2020
White alone (NH)	67	120	85.90%	76.92%
Black or African American alone (NH)	0	2	0.00%	1.28%
Native American or Alaska Native alone (NH)	0	0	0.00%	0.00%
Asian alone (NH)	0	6	0.00%	3.85%
Native Hawaiian or Pacific Islander alone (NH)	1	0	1.28%	0.00%
Other race alone (NH)	0	0	0.00%	0.00%
Mixed race or Multiracial (NH)	0	6	0.00%	3.85%
Hispanic or Latino (any race)	10	22	12.82%	14.10%
Total	78	156	100.00%	100.00%

=== 2010 Census ===
The 2010 United States census counted 78 people, 33 households, and 24 families in the CDP. The population density was 964.4 per square mile (372.4/km^{2}). There were 35 housing units at an average density of 432.7 per square mile (167.1/km^{2}). The racial makeup was 97.44% (76) White, 0.00% (0) Black or African American, 0.00% (0) Native American, 0.00% (0) Asian, 1.28% (1) Pacific Islander, 0.00% (0) from other races, and 1.28% (1) from two or more races. Hispanic or Latino of any race were 12.82% (10) of the population.

Of the 33 households, 36.4% had children under the age of 18; 51.5% were married couples living together; 15.2% had a female householder with no husband present and 27.3% were non-families. Of all households, 27.3% were made up of individuals and 15.2% had someone living alone who was 65 years of age or older. The average household size was 2.36 and the average family size was 2.71.

25.6% of the population were under the age of 18, 2.6% from 18 to 24, 28.2% from 25 to 44, 29.5% from 45 to 64, and 14.1% who were 65 years of age or older. The median age was 39.5 years. For every 100 females, the population had 100.0 males. For every 100 females ages 18 and older there were 87.1 males.
