= Elias Hicks =

American Quaker preacher (1748–1830)

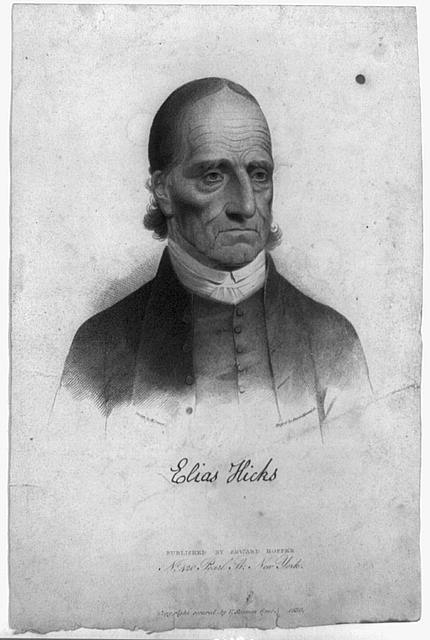
- Engraving after Henry Inman, c. 1830
- Born: March 19, 1748; Hempstead, New York
- Died: February 27, 1830 (aged 81); Jericho, New York, US
- Occupations: Carpenter, farmer
- Known for: Traveling Quaker minister Hicksite Quakerism
- Spouse: Jemima Seaman (married January 2, 1771)
- Children: 11
- Relatives: Edward Hicks (cousin)

Elias Hicks (March 19, 1748 – February 27, 1830) was a traveling Quaker minister from Long Island, New York. In his ministry he promoted doctrines deemed unorthodox by many which led to lasting controversy, and caused the second major schism within the Religious Society of Friends (the first caused by George Keith in 1691).

== Early life ==
Elias Hicks was born in Hempstead, New York, in 1748, the son of John Hicks (1711–1789) and Martha Hicks (née Smith; 1709–1759), who were farmers. He was a carpenter by trade and in his early twenties he became a Quaker like his father.

On January 2, 1771, Hicks married a fellow Quaker, Jemima Seaman, at the Westbury Meeting House and they had eleven children, only five of whom reached adulthood. Hicks eventually became a farmer, settling on his wife's parents' farm in Jericho, New York, in what is now known as the Elias Hicks House. There he and his wife provided, as did other Jericho Quakers, free board and lodging to any traveler on the Jericho Turnpike rather than have them seek accommodation in taverns for the night.

In 1778, Hicks helped to build the Friends meeting house in Jericho, which remains a place of Quaker worship. Hicks preached actively in Quaker meeting, and by 1778 he was acknowledged as a recorded minister. Hicks was regarded as a gifted speaker with a strong voice and dramatic flair. He drew large crowds when he was said to be attending meetings, sometimes in the thousands. In November 1829, the young Walt Whitman heard Hicks preach at Morrison's Hotel in Brooklyn, and later said, "Always Elias Hicks gives the service of pointing to the fountain of all naked theology, all religion, all worship, all the truth to which you are possibly eligible—namely in yourself and your inherent relations. Others talk of Bibles, saints, churches, exhortations, vicarious atonements—the canons outside of yourself and apart from man—Elias Hicks points to the religion inside of man's very own nature. This he incessantly labors to kindle, nourish, educate, bring forward and strengthen."

== Anti-slavery activism ==
Elias Hicks was one of the early Quaker abolitionists. In 1778 on Long Island, he joined with fellow Quakers who had begun manumitting their slaves as early as March 1776 (James Titus and Phebe Willets Mott Dodge). The Quakers at Westbury Meeting were amongst the first in New York to do so and, gradually following their example, all Westbury Quaker slaves were freed by 1799.

In 1794, Hicks was a founder of the Charity Society of Jericho and Westbury Meetings, established to give aid to local poor African Americans and provide their children with education.

In 1811, Hicks wrote Observations on the Slavery of Africans and Their Descendants and in it he linked the moral issue of emancipation to the Quaker Peace Testimony, by stating that slavery was the product of war. He identified economic reasons for the perpetuation of slavery:

Q. 10. By what class of the people is the slavery of the Africans and their descendants supported and encouraged? A. Principally by the purchasers and consumers of the produce of the slaves' labour; as the profits arising from the produce of their labour, is the only stimulus or inducement for making slaves.

and he advocated a consumer boycott of slave-produced goods to remove the economic reasons for their existence:

Q. 11. What effect would it have on the slave holders and their slaves, should the people of the United States of America and the inhabitants of Great Britain, refuse to purchase or make use of any goods that are the product of Slavery? A. It would doubtless have a particular effect on the slave holders, by circumscribing their avarice, and preventing their heaping up riches, and living in a state of luxury and excess on the gain of oppression …

Observations on the Slavery of Africans and Their Descendents gave the free produce movement its central argument. This movement promoted an embargo of all goods produced by slave labor, which were mainly cotton cloth and cane sugar, in favor of produce from the paid labor of free people. Though the free produce movement was not intended to be a religious response to slavery, most of the free produce stores were Quaker in origin, as with the first such store, that of Benjamin Lundy in Baltimore in 1826.

Hicks supported Lundy's scheme to assist the emigration of freed slaves to Haiti and in 1824, he hosted a meeting on how to facilitate this at his home in Jericho. In the late 1820s, he argued in favor of raising funds to buy slaves and settle them as free people in the American Southwest.

Hicks influenced the abolition of slavery in his home state, from the partial abolition of the 1799 Gradual Abolition Act to the 1817 Gradual Manumission in New York State Act which led to the final emancipation of all remaining slaves within the state on July 4, 1827.

== Doctrinal views ==
Hicks ministry would be part of the first schism within Quakerism, the 1827–1828 Hicksite–Orthodox split.

The central doctrinal focus of the Hicksite–Orthodox split was the role of the Bible and Jesus Christ. Both Hicksites and Orthodox Quakers viewed their positions as continuations of the original Quakers views. On the other hand, historians such as Glen Crothers argue that the schism resulted from the Second Great Awakening in the United States leading to Orthodox Quakers adopting more Biblical views as influenced by American Evangelicals.

Elias Hicks argued that Inward Light in each individual is the primary focus of an individual's faith over creed or doctrine, which follows George Fox and early Quaker concepts of inward light as "the presence of Christ in the heart", God's presence in each person, and the Holy Spirit speaking through each person. (The interchangeable use of Jesus, God, and the Holy Spirit is due to his and early Quaker rejection of the Trinity.)

As a consequence, the Bible was to Hicks a secondary source of faith and understanding of God, as it is written entirely and divinely inspired by the Holy Spirit. He wrote

I confirm my doctrine abundantly from their testimony: and I have always endeavored sincerely to place them [the scriptures] in their true place and station, but never dare exalt them above what they themselves declare; and as no spring can rise higher than its fountain, so likewise the Scriptures can only direct to the fountain from whence they originated – the spirit of truth: as saith the apostle, 'The things of God knoweth no man, but the Spirit of God'; therefore when the Scriptures have directed and pointed us to this light within, or Spirit of Truth, there they must stop – it is their ultimatum – the top stone of what they can do And no other external testimony of men or books can do any more.

Hicks sparked great controversy for writing in letters to his friends that the scriptures created more harm than good, because different factions of Christians held the Bible in too high a regard and without using the inward light as the primary source of understanding with which to interpret the Bible. In a personal letter he wrote

For it is my candid belief, that those that hold and believe the Scriptures to be the only rule of faith and practice, to these it does much more hurt than good. And has anything tended more to divide Christendom into sects and parties than the Scriptures? and by which so many cruel and bloody wars have been promulgated [promoted]. And yet at the same time, may it not be one of the best books, if rightly used under the guidance of the Holy Spirit? But, if abused, like every other blessing, it becomes a curse. Therefore to these it always does more hurt than good; and thou knowest that these comprehend far the greatest part of Christendom!

Regarding Jesus Christ, Hicks wrote that the miracles Jesus performed were meant to prove the existence of God. He argued that Jesus was the savior of the Jewish people by replacing the law put forth by Moses. He also argued that Jesus provided the path to salvation for all people exemplified by his life, which was perfectly and entirely guided and united with the Holy Spirit through his inward light. To Hicks, Jesus divinity by being united with God and the Holy Spirit occurred at two points of Jesus' life, his divine conception and his baptism by John the Baptist.

Regarding salvation, Hicks firstly rejected the concept of original sin. Because of this, he did not argue that the sacrifice of Jesus' body or his blood provided salvation, nor that faith in him does so. Rather that salvation came through living as Jesus exemplified, that is, in accordance and unity with the Holy Spirit/Inward Light. Consequently Hicks implicitly refutes doctrines of salvation such as penal substitution, or predestination.

In the year 1829, "Six Queries" were proposed by Thomas Leggett, Jr., of New York, and answered by Elias Hicks. The last was as follows:

Sixth Query. What relation has the body of Jesus to the Saviour of man? Dost thou believe that the crucifixion of the outward body of Jesus Christ was an atonement for our sins?

Hicks Answered. "In reply to the first part of this query, I answer, I believe, in unison with our ancient Friends, that it was the garment in which he performed all his mighty works, or as Paul expressed it, 'Know ye not that your body is the temple of the Holy Ghost, which is in you', therefore he charged them not to defile those temples. What is attributed to that body, I acknowledge and give to that body, in its place, according as the Scripture attributeth it, which is through and because of that which dwelt and acted in it.

"But that which sanctified and kept the body pure (and made all acceptable in him) was the life, holiness, and righteousness of the Spirit. And the same thing that kept his vessel pure, it is the same thing that cleanseth us."

"In reply to the second part of this query, I would remark that I see no need of directing men to the type for the antitype, neither to the outward temple, nor yet to Jerusalem, neither to Jesus Christ or his blood [outwardly], knowing that neither the righteousness of faith, nor the word of it doth so direct."

"The new and second covenant is dedicated with the blood, the life of Christ Jesus, which is the alone atonement unto God, by which all his people are washed, sanctified, cleansed, and redeemed to God."

Hicks rejected the existence of an external Devil. He never spoke of eternal Hell but he expressed the importance of the soul's union "now" in preparation for the "realms of eternity" and how the soul's condemnation is elected through our free agency, not by God's foreordination.

Hicks rejected of the notion of an outward Devil as the source of evil, but rather emphasized that it was the human 'passions' or 'propensities'. Hicks stressed that basic urges, including all sexual passions, were neither implanted by an external evil, but all were aspects of human nature as created by God. Hicks claimed, in his sermon Let Brotherly Love Continue at the Byberry Friends Meeting in 1824 that:

He gave us passions—if we may call them passions—in order that we might seek after those things which we need, and which we had a right to experience and know.

Hicks taught that all wrongdoing and suffering occurred in the world as the consequence of "an excess in the indulgence of propensities. Independent of the regulating influence of God's light."

== Hicksite–Orthodox split ==
This first split in Quakerism was not entirely due to Hicks' ministry and internal divisions. It was, in part, also a response within Quakerism to the influences of the Second Great Awakening, the revival of Protestant evangelism that began in the 1790s as a reaction to religious skepticism, deism, and the liberal theology of Rational Christianity.

However, doctrinal tensions among Friends due to Hicks' teachings had emerged as early as 1808 and as Hicks' influence grew, prominent visiting English evangelical public Friends, including William Forster and Anna Braithwaite, were prompted to travel to New York State in the period from 1821 to 1827 to denounce his views.

Their presence severely exacerbated the differences among American Quakers, differences that had been underscored by the 1819 split between the American Unitarians and Congregationalists. The influence of Anna Braithwaite was especially strong. She visited the United States between 1823 and 1827 and published her Letters and observations relating to the controversy respecting the doctrines of Elias Hicks in 1824 in which she depicted Hicks as a radical eccentric. Hicks felt obliged to respond and in the same year published a letter to his ally in Philadelphia Meeting, Dr. Edwin Atlee, in The Misrepresentations of Anna Braithwaite. This in turn was replied to by Braithwaite in A Letter from Anna Braithwaite to Elias Hicks, On the Nature of his Doctrines in 1825. Neither party was persuaded by this exchange.

In 1819, Hicks had devoted much energy into influencing the meeting houses in Philadelphia and this was followed by years of intense organizational turmoil. Eventually, due to both external influences and constant internal strife, matters came to a head there in 1826.

After the 1826 Philadelphia Yearly Meeting, at which Hicks' sermon had stressed the importance of the Inner Light before Scripture, Quaker elders decided to visit each meeting house in the city to examine the doctrinal soundness of all ministers and elders. This caused great resentment that culminated at the following Philadelphia Yearly Meeting in 1827. Hicks was not present when the differences between the meeting houses ended in acrimony and division, precipitated by the inability of the Meeting to reach consensus on the appointment of a new clerk required to record its discernment.

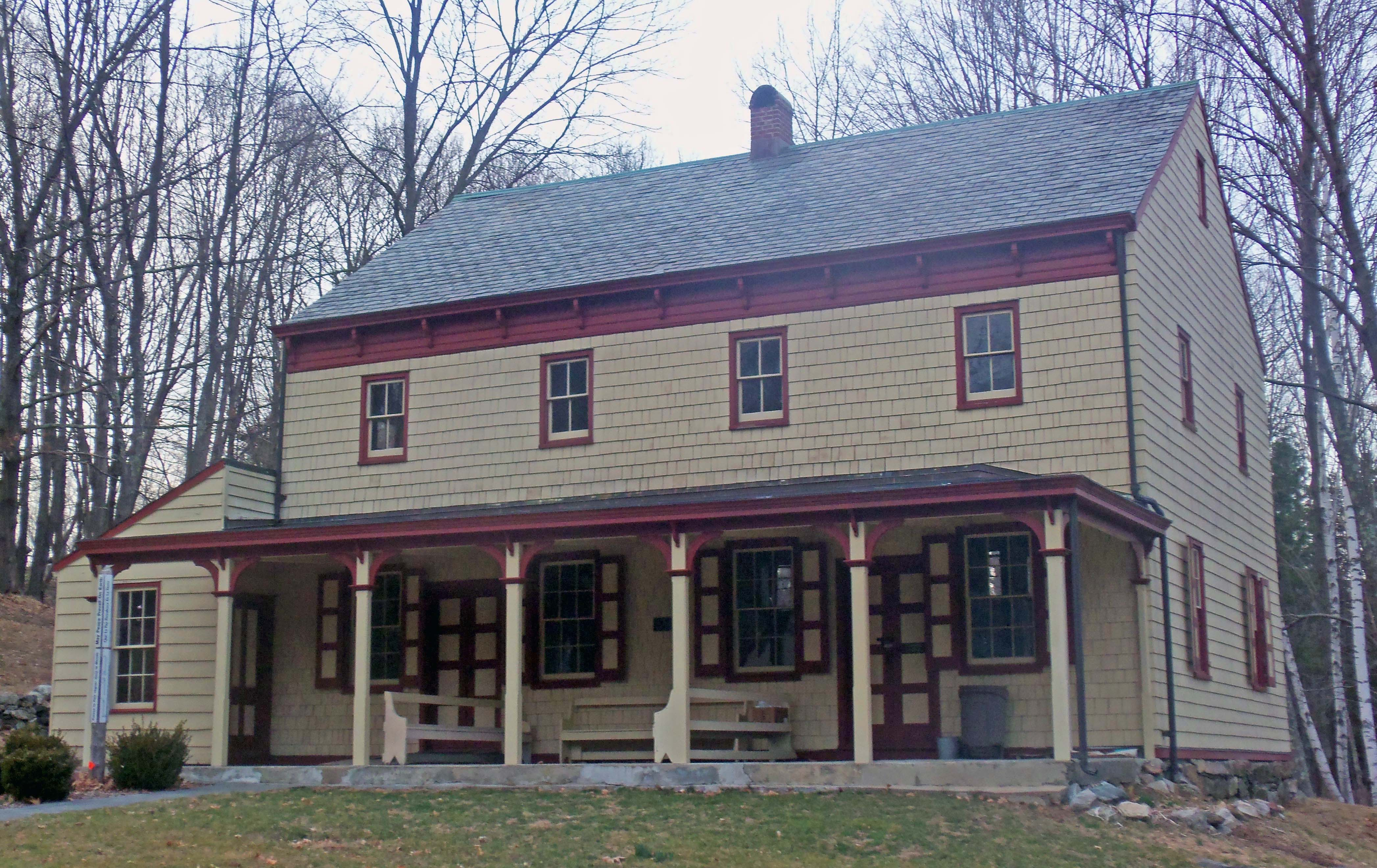
Amawalk Friends Meeting House in Yorktown Heights, New York, one of the few built by a Hicksite meeting

Though the initial separation was intended to be temporary, by 1828, there were two independent Quaker groupings in the city, both claiming to be the Philadelphia Yearly Meeting. Other yearly meetings split along similar lines during subsequent years, including those in New York, Baltimore, Ohio, and Indiana. Those who followed Hicks became termed Hicksites and his critics termed Orthodox Friends, each faction considering itself to be the true expression of the legacy of the founder of the Friends, George Fox.

The split was also based on marked socioeconomic factors with Hicksite Friends being mostly poor and rural and with Orthodox Friends being mostly urban and middle-class. Many of the rural country Friends kept to Quaker traditions of "plain speech" and "plain dress", both long-abandoned by Quakers in the towns and cities.

Both Orthodox and Hicksite factions were active in the formation of educational institutions. To wit, Orthodox Quakers founded Haverford College and Hicksites Swarthmore College.

Both the Orthodox and Hicksite Friends experienced further schisms. The main following of the Orthodox Friends followed the practices of the English Quaker Joseph John Gurney who possessed an evangelical position. As time went on, a majority of the meetings endorsed forms of worship much like those of a traditional Protestant church. Friends in line with Gurney became known as Gurneyites. Those Orthodox Friends who did not agree with the practices of the Gurneyites, led by John Wilbur of Rhode Island, branched off to form the Wilburite branch of Conservative, Primitive and Independent yearly meetings. Those Hicksite Friends who did not agree with the lessened discipline within the Hicksite yearly meetings founded Congregational, or Progressive groups.

In 1828, the split in American Quakerism also spread to the Quaker community in Canada that had immigrated there from New York, the New England states and Pennsylvania in the 1790s. This resulted in a parallel system of Yearly Meetings in Upper Canada, as in the United States.

The eventual division between Hicksites and the evangelical Orthodox Friends in the US was both deep and long-lasting. Full reconciliation between them took decades to achieve, from the first reunified Monthly Meetings in the 1920s until finally resolved with the reunification of Baltimore Yearly Meeting in 1968.

== Later life ==
On June 24, 1829, at the age of 81, Elias Hicks went on his final traveling ministry to western and central New York State, arriving home in Jericho on November 11, 1829. There, in January 1830, he suffered a stroke that left him partially paralyzed and on February 14, 1830, he suffered an incapacitating secondary stroke. He died some two weeks later on February 27, 1830, his dying concern being that no cotton blanket, a product of slavery, should cover him on his deathbed. Elias Hicks was interred in the Jericho Friends' Burial Ground as was earlier his wife, Jemima, who predeceased him on March 17, 1829. Samuel E. Clements, an editor of the newspaper the Patriot, aroused controversy when he and two friends attempted to dig up the corpse of Elias Hicks to create a plaster mold of his head.
