= Katherine M. Cook =

- Cook in 1934
- Born: Katherine Margaret O'Brien; May 15, 1876; Lanesboro, Minnesota, U.S.
- Died: June 5, 1962 (aged 86); Silver Spring, Maryland, U.S.
- Resting place: Denver, Colorado, U.S.
- Education: State Teachers College; Teachers College, Columbia University
- Occupations: educator; writer; government official
- Organizations: Chief, Division of Rural Education, U.S. Bureau of Education; Chief, Division of Special Problems, Office of Education, U.S. Department of Health, Education, and Welfare
- Movement: Rural education in country life
- Spouse: Charles K. Cook (m. 1896)
- Children: 1

Katherine M. Cook (1876–1962) was an American educator and government official who specialized in rural education. After serving as Colorado state superintendent of public instruction, she moved to Washington, D.C., where she served as Chief, Division of Rural Education, at the U.S. Bureau of Education, and Chief, Division of Special Problems, Office of Education, in the U.S. Department of Health, Education, and Welfare (HEW).

== Early life and education ==
Katherine Margaret O'Brien was born in Lanesboro, Minnesota, on May 15, 1876. Her parents were Daniel and Elizabeth (Monahan) O'Brien.

She was educated at West High School Denver, Colorado; State Teachers College, Greeley, Colorado (A.B. degree, 1910); Teachers College, Columbia University, New York City (A.M. degree, 1912).

== Career ==
Cook taught at rural schools in Colorado, and elementary schools in Denver. She served as county superintendent of schools, Adams County, Colorado (1905-09); Colorado state superintendent of public instruction (1909-10); principal of the Nevada County Normal School in Panaca, Nevada, and principal of the County High School (1912-15).

On February 1, 1915, in Washington, D.C., she joined the Division of Rural Education at the U.S. Bureau of Education, serving as secretary before becoming the division chief in 1922. In 1946, she retired from her government position of chief, Division of Special Problems, Office of Education, at HEW.

"She traveled all over the United States and its territories, studying and evaluating rural school conditions, once hopping from school to school in Alaska in a small plane." (Evening Star, June 9, 1962)

She was the author of numerous bulletins and leaflets of the Bureau of Education. She was also a contributor to educational magazines such as Journal of Rural Education, School and Society, and School Board Journal on various educational subjects. Cook was the co-author of The Consolidation of Rural schools and a contributor to Book of Rural Life.

Cook was a member of National Education Association, American Association of University Women, and American Country Life Association.

== Personal life ==
In June 1896, she married Charles K. Cook, of Denver. They had one son who died young.

In politics, she was a Democrat. In religion, she was Catholic.

In February 1915, she left Denver and became a resident of Washington, D.C.

Katherine Cook died Silver Spring, Maryland, June 5, 1962; interment was in Denver.

== Selected works ==
School laws of the state of Colorado

- School laws of the state of Colorado. U.S.A. (1909)
- Educational survey of Wyoming (1917)
- Report of an inquiry into the administration and support of the Colorado school system (1917), with A. C. Monahan
- Feasibility of consolidating the schools of Mount Joy Township, Adams County, Pa. (1920)
- Suggestions for consolidating the rural schools of Beaufort County, North Carolina : a digest of the report (1923), with E. E. Windes
- Constructive tendencies in rural education (1925)
- The house of the people; an account of Mexico's new schools of action (1932)
- Public education in Puerto Rico (1934)
- Public education in the Virgin Islands (1934)
- Public education in the Philippine islands ... (1935)
- Public education in Hawaii (1936)
- Native and minority groups (1937)
- Public education in the Panama Canal zone (1939)
- Opportunities for the preparation of teachers in conservation education (1940), with Florence Evan Reynolds
- Opportunities for the preparation of teachers in the use of visual aids in instruction (1940), with Florence Evan Reynolds
- State postwar planning in education : some results (1946)
