= Rutherford College =

Rutherford College may refer to:

- Rutherford College, North Carolina, Burke County, North Carolina, United States
- Rutherford College of Technology, predecessor of Northumbria University, Newcastle upon Tyne, United Kingdom
- Rutherford College, Auckland, New Zealand
- Rutherford College, Kent, University of Kent, United Kingdom
- Rutherford College (North Carolina), former Christian college

== See also ==
- Rutherford (disambiguation)
- Rutherford High School (disambiguation)
- Rutherford School (disambiguation)
