= Rutherfurd =

Rutherfurd may refer to:

== People ==
- Andrew Rutherfurd, Lord Rutherfurd (1791–1854), Scottish judge
- Andrew Rutherfurd-Clark, Lord Rutherfurd-Clark (1828–1899), Scottish judge
- Edward Rutherfurd (born 1948), author of historical fiction (pen name)
- Emily Rutherfurd (born 1974), American actress
- Helena Rutherfurd Ely (1858-1920), American author, amateur gardener and founding member of the Garden Club of America
- Janet Auchincloss Rutherfurd (1945–1985), American socialite and half-sister to Jacqueline Kennedy Onassis
- John Rutherfurd (1760–1840), American politician and land surveyor
- John Rutherfurd (soldier) (1712–1758), Scottish soldier and politician.
- Lewis Morris Rutherfurd (1816–1892), American lawyer, astronomer, astrophotographer
- Lucy Page Mercer Rutherfurd (1891–1948), mistress and long-time friend of United States President Franklin Delano Roosevelt
- Mary Rutherfurd Jay (1872–1953), great, great granddaughter of Founding Father John Jay, one of America's earliest landscape architects
- Walter Rutherfurd (1723–1804), Scottish-American soldier and merchant
- William Gordon Rutherfurd (1765–1818), Royal Navy officer
- Taylor Gayle Rutherfurd (born 2004), American singer

== Other ==
- Rutherfurd Hall a cultural center and museum located in Allamuchy, NJ
- Rutherfurd (crater), lunar impact crater
- Rutherfurd Observatory, astronomical facility maintained by Columbia University
- Rutherford (disambiguation)
