= Rural American history =

Evolution of American rural life and agriculture over centuries

A lineworker installing power lines in Alabama, 1935. Rural electrification, as part of Franklin D. Roosevelt's New Deal, gave many rural American homes electricity for the first time.

Rural American history is the history from colonial times to the present of rural American society, economy, and politics. According to Robert P. Swierenga, "Rural history centers on the lifestyle and activities of farmers and their family patterns, farming practices, social structures, political ties, and community institutions."

== Long-term trends ==
A main theme in rural history is the development of agriculture and its local support network. For example in his history of agriculture in Wisconsin, Jerry Apps includes a wide range of topics:

Environmental preconditions; the Native American experience, the original Yankee settlers; lead mining; the rise and fall of wheat; the role of steamboats and railroads; relation of rural and urban trends; lumbering; early mechanization; German, Swiss and Scandinavian immigration; the growth of cities; farmers in local and state government and politics; rural schools; transition to crop agriculture; the cheese and dairy industry; farming as a business; the Wisconsin idea; the College of Agriculture outreach programs; automobiles and good roads; tractors replace horses; arrival of rural free delivery, electricity and telephone; livestock raising; cranberry growing; federal controls and subsidies; truck farming; irrigation; consolidation into mega farms; the farm crisis of the 1980s; environmental degradation and recovery; and the impact of high tech.

=== Rural and farm population totals ===
The rural population is defined by size of place under 2,500 and includes non-farmers living in villages and the open countryside. At the first census in 1790, the rural population was 3.7 million and urban only 202,000. The nation was 95% rural, and the great majority of rural residents were subsistence farmers. By 1860 the rural population had exploded to 25 million but urban had grown faster to 6 million, or 20% urban. Many non-farmers lived in villages and small towns classified as "rural." The population in 1890 reached 63 million people, thanks to high birth rates and high immigration from Europe. The urban proportion was 35%, comprising 22 million living in 2,700 cities of 2,500 or more people. In 1890 65% of the national population, or 36 million people, lived in rural areas. Of these 2.7 million lived in 13,000 towns of less than 2,500 people, and 36 million—mostly farmers—lived in open country. In 1920 the urban population reached 54 million, or 51% while rural America had 52 million or 49%. In 2020, the rural population of the United States was approximately 66 million people, accounting for 20% of the U.S. population. In 2020 there were just over 2 million farms in the U.S., averaging 444 acres and occupying 897 million acres in total. About 90% are small farms, but 78% of the output is produced by the large farms with $350,000 or more revenue.

The economy has shifted, first from agriculture to industry in cities and more recently to a service economy with a large suburban base. Farming was the primary occupation of 72% of the national labor force in 1820, 60% in 1860, 37% in 1900, and 26% in 1920. The 50% level came in 1877.

In 1900 29.1 million Americans were gainfully employed, of whom 10.4 million were on farms. In all rural America comprised about 2,500 counties, with an average of 2,300 farms each, or 5.7 million farms in all. To help with the daily grind the farms hired 4.4 million laborers.

=== Mechanization ===
Mechanization and new technologies transformed farming practices over time. By the late 19th century the U.S. had the largest and most productive system of commercial agriculture in the world. Rural towns competed for access to the railroad system. Towns that had a station sharply cut the cost of travel and shipping farm products out and consumer products in. Towns with a station attracted families that had the money to get established in farming.

Regarding the labor needed to produce one bushel of wheat, the U.S. Department of Agriculture states:

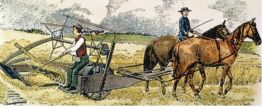
McCormick 1847 reaper handles wheat crop

1894 being compared with 1830, the required human labor declined from three hours and three minutes to ten minutes. The heavy, clumsy plow of 1830 had given way to the disk plow that both plowed and pulverized the soil in the same operation; hand sowing had been displaced by the mechanical seeder drawn by horses; the cradling and thrashing with flails and hand winnowing had given way to reaping, thrashing, and sacking with the combined reaper and thrasher drawn by horses.

The time decline of 95% for wheat was followed by an 85% decline in the time for corn:

From 1855 to 1894 the time of human labor required to produce one bushel of corn on an average declined from four hours and thirty four minutes to forty-one minutes. This was because inventors had given to the farmers of 1894 the gang plow, the disk harrow, the corn planter drawn by horses, and the four-section harrow for pulverizing the top soil; because they had given to the farmer the self-binder drawn by horses to cut the stalks and bind them; a machine for removing the husks from the ears and in the same operation for cutting the husks, stalks, and blades for feeding, the power being supplied by a steam engine; because they had given to the farmer a marvelous corn sheller, operated by steam and shelling one bushel of corn per minute instead of the old way of corn shelling in which the labor of one man was required for one hundred minutes to do the same work.

=== Identity and political culture ===
Joshua Shaw's 1823 painting View in the Pennsylvania Countryside. The U.S. state of Pennsylvania is known for its history of rural communities along the Susquehanna River, including those of Quakers and Amish.

Rural versus urban remains a factor in American politics. Hal S. Baron argues farmers often were at odds with the dominant worldview. Their localism was rooted in Jeffersonian democracy and its republican ideals. They feared concentrated economic and political power, and distrusted urban ostentation. These looked like potential threats to their own freedom and to the overall American well-being. Such views permeated the Grangers and Populists, as they challenged the dominance of railroads and merchants. Rural America was skeptical of the Country Life Movement when metropolitan do-gooders came in and tried to upgrade them. They warned against the outside experts, who wanted to consolidate schools and replace local control with rule by the elites in the county seat. The Social Gospel did not echo the true Gospel they knew so well. The mixed reception of popular culture and consumerism in rural America further illustrates this tension between rural traditions and modernizing forces. Ever since the battles between Jeffersonians and Federalists, the conflict between localism and cosmopolitanism has provided clues to understand the defensiveness of rural America.

Baron argues that better communication between countryside and city has eased the conflict. Nevertheless rural identity, deeply rooted in the land, has profoundly shaped American identity. There is a strong sense of community in rural areas, with residents working to find solutions to problems rather than abandoning their communities. Intellectuals often present rural areas as repositories of traditional American values and ways of life.

In recent national politics, rural voters have steadily become more Republican. According to Pew Research Center data, Republican Donald Trump won 59% of the rural voters in 2016, and 65% in 2020. He carried rural white voters with 62% in 2016 and 71% in 2020. Exit polls in the 2024 election show that Trump carried 63% of the vote in rural areas, 50% in suburbs, and 37% in cities.

=== Economics of land and agriculture ===
The nation had an abundance of high quality farm land and a severe shortage of laborers. Farm work became family work. After the federal government bought out the Indian tribes (which moved further west), pioneers rushed in to establish farms. The Ohio experience is representative, according to Kevin F. Kern and Gregory S. Wilson. A high priority was to eliminate both the dense forests and the abundant wildlife. The nearest trees were chopped down and the logs used to build the log cabin to live in, along with stacks of firewood. Year by year the other trees were cut down to make fences or burned to produce ash that increased soil fertility. Ohio from 1800 to 1900 went from 95% forest to 10%. At the same time farmers eradicated varmints that posed threats to their own safety, or to livestock, or to crops. Rattlesnakes were an immediate danger to the family. Bears, wolves, and wildcats threatened the cattle, hogs and chickens. Deer, raccoons, and squirrels devoured young crops. Traps and shotguns led to the rapid decline or complete elimination of many species from the landscape. The last wild black bear in Ohio was killed in 1881.

Farm families produced almost all their food and clothing and traded surplus items with neighbors. Typically they exchanged their small surpluses of food, tobacco, rice, or lumber for imported items with the country merchant at a nearby crossroads. Or they sold grain to the miller, or sold some cattle or sheep to an itinerant buyer. A long-term priority was clearing the land, expanding the farm, and making plans for the sons to inherit land and the daughters to have a dowry.

Land ownership has been central to rural American life, linked to ideals of independence and political influence. Family farms were a dominant feature of rural life for much of American history. Down to the early 20th century, farmers had a priority of establishing their children in farming. After 1920 technology caused revolution, as horses and mules and hired hands were replaced by powerful machines. Farms were consolidated: a few giant operations replaced dozens of small ones. The family farm was replaced by a locally owned business enterprise. The great majority of children left farming and moved to nearby towns.

In the 20th century rural residents advocated for federal and state help to obtain modern conveniences including rural free mail delivery (1906); paved roads (1920s); electricity (1930s); telephones (1930s); interstate highways (1950s); and internet access (21st century). Agriculture remains important in the 21st century, with rural America still being the primary source for the nation's food, fuel, and fiber.

=== Environmental impact ===
The changing rural economy had an impact on the environment. The first stage of industrialization came in rural towns in New England in the early 19th century when they started to use water power from its rivers to run the machinery in mills that turned wool and cotton into thread and cloth. The result was a pollution of the communal water supply that angered farmers. Likewise coal and lead mines in rural areas produced waste that polluted the water supply.

In the colonial era, access to natural resources was allocated by individual towns, and disputes over fisheries or land use were resolved at the local level. Changing technologies, however, strained traditional ways of resolving disputes of resource use, and local governments had limited control over powerful special interests. For example, the damming of rivers for mills cut off upriver towns from fisheries; and logging and clearing of forest in watersheds harmed local fisheries downstream. In New England, many farmers became uneasy as they noticed clearing of the forest changed stream flows and decreased bird populations which had helped control insects and other pests. These concerns become widely known with the publication of Man and Nature (1864) by George Perkins Marsh. In the South, the emphasis on tobacco in Virginia and Maryland exhausted the nutrients in the soil, forcing farmers to abandon the old farm and repeat the process on new lands, and repeat every 15 or 20 years.

=== Country life ===
In the 21st century issues like limited broadband access, strained educational systems, and economic distress continue to be serious. However, rural areas have also shown resilience and found creative solutions to their problems.

==== General stores ====
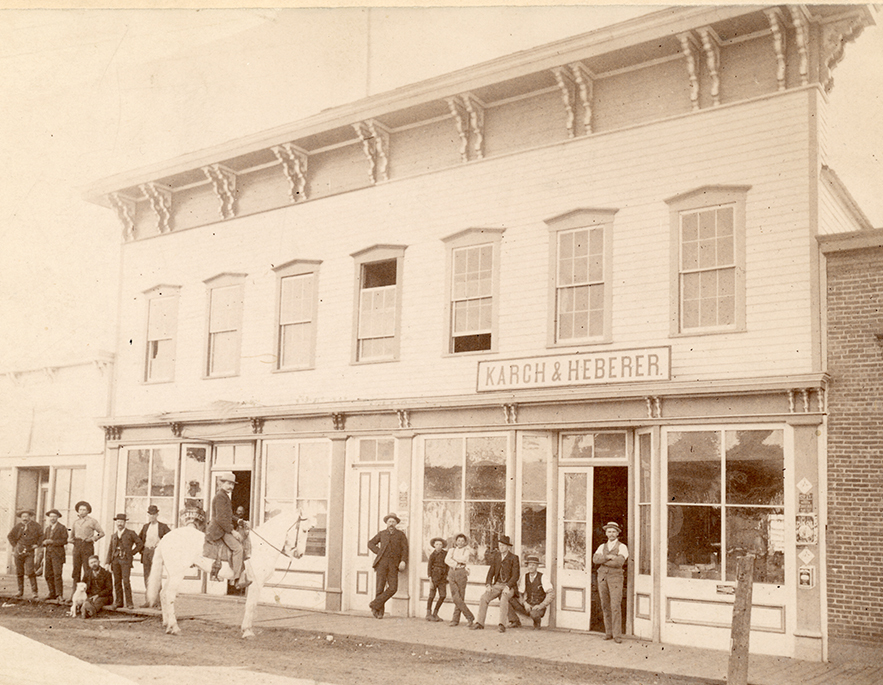
Karch & Heberer General Store in Fairplay, Colorado, late 19th century

General stores and itinerant peddlers dominated in rural America until the arrival of the automobile after 1910. Most of the early peddlers were Yankees; after 1859 most were Jewish immigrants. Farmers and ranchers depended on general stores that had a limited stock and slow turnover; they made enough profit to stay in operation by selling at high prices. Often farmers would barter butter, cheese, eggs, vegetables or meat which the merchant would resell. Prices were not marked on each item; instead the customer negotiated a price. Men did most of the shopping, since the main criterion was credit rather than quality of goods. Indeed, most customers shopped on credit, paying later when crops or cattle were sold; the owner's ability to judge credit worthiness was vital to his success. The store was often a gathering point for local men to chat, pass around the weekly newspaper, and talk politics.

==== Southern country store ====
Outside the South, there were plenty of small towns where merchants and storekeepers could prosper. In the antebellum South there was no counterpart. The American Civil War devastated the rural economy as cotton prices fell and the vast sums invested in slaves disappeared overnight. Before the Civil War plantation owners handled the cotton or tobacco matters and met consumer needs of their family and slaves. They dealt directly with wholesalers (called "factors") in distant Southern cities like Richmond, Baltimore, Mobile, Louisville, and St Louis. In poor white areas there were occasional merchants. When slavery was abolished the people urgently needed merchants. Ambitious men suddenly appeared after 1865 and played a leading role in refashioning the economic and social fabric of the South. By 1878, for example, there were 1,468 local merchants in Alabama, or 12 for every 10,000 people. These merchants were diverse in their backgrounds and operations, serving as crucial intermediaries between rural communities and larger markets. Many if not most were Jewish peddlers and merchants from the North. They had a better rapport with Black customers.

Merchants used the newly built railroads to link the rural cotton or tobacco economy to the national economy. They worked with wholesalers in the handful of Southern cities to bring in northern consumer products. Legally they depended on new state laws creating the "crop-lien system". The merchant legally owned the entire commercial crop (usually cotton) from planting to harvest. He sold supplies on credit. When the crop was harvested the farmer brought it all to the merchant who then sold it, paid what the farmer owed the owner of the land, cleared the farmer's debt to the store, and returned any surplus. By providing credit to the poor white and black farmers, they exerted more influence every week than the white land owners.

The role of the country store extended beyond simple trade. It was a general store that provided a wide range of goods: pills, petticoats and plows and a hundred other items. The local federal post office was inside, and there were benches outside for the bystanders. The farmers produced most of their own food, but they did buy necessities. In one Florida store with a largely Black clientele, the items most often purchased were corn, salt pork, sugar, lard, coffee, syrup, rice, flour, cloth, shoes, shotguns, shells, and patent medicines. Everything had a price except the one item in greatest demand: gossip was free.

Merchants were the liaison between rural areas and the few cities in the postwar South. They handled the flow of goods, information, and credit. Merchants depended on credit from urban wholesalers, and like the sharecroppers they paid off their own debts with proceeds from the cotton or tobacco harvests.

In the paternalistic mill villages that opened in the South in the late 19th century, the textile mills provided jobs for all family members, rented them cheap housing and paid in scrip that they used to buy food and supplies in company stores. Independent merchants were few.

==== Weekly newspapers ====
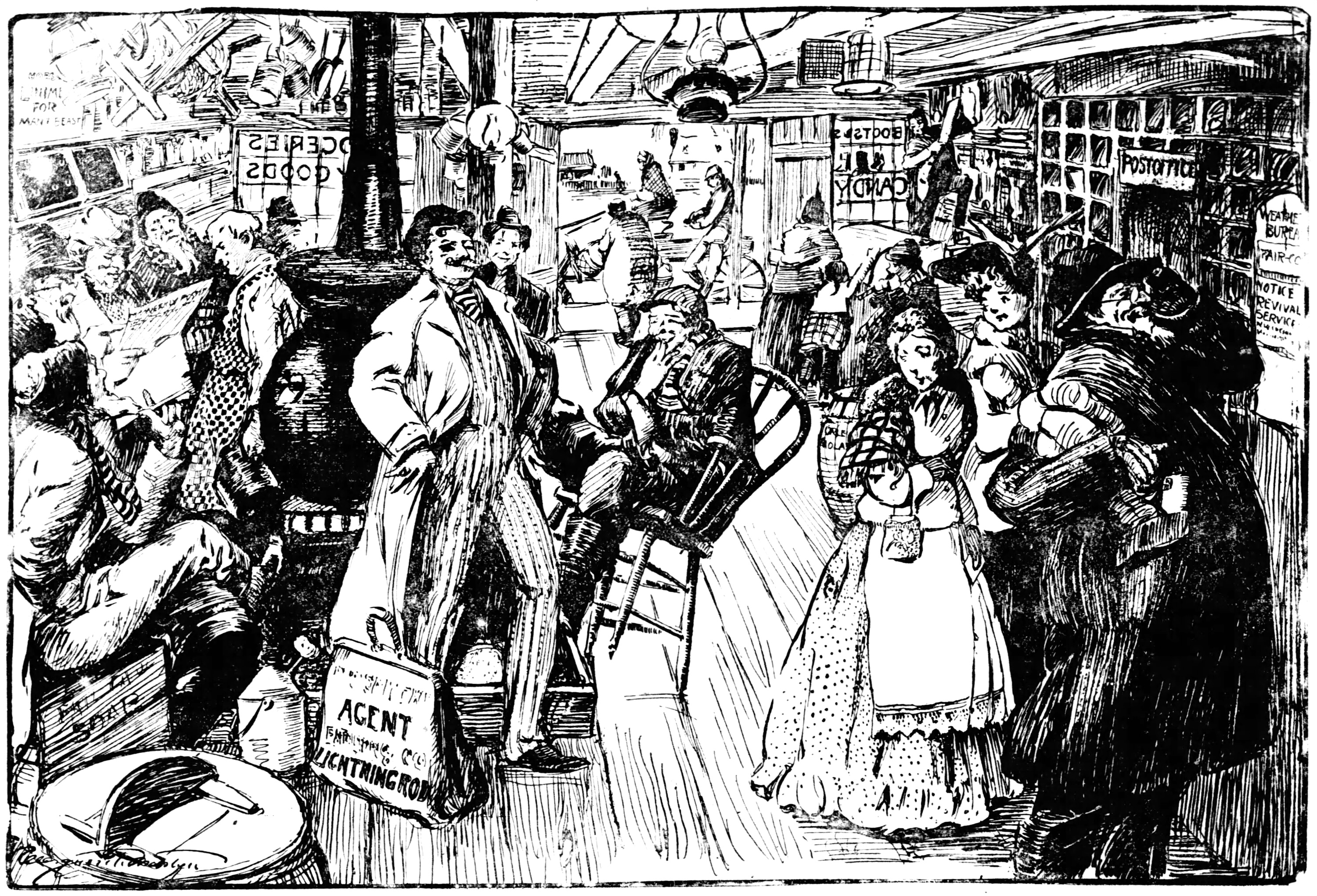
Fanciful drawing of a rural general store in 1906. On the far left, a group of men listen to a reading the weekly newspaper.

Across the nation in the late 19th century nearly every county seat and most towns of more than 1,000 population sponsored one or more weekly newspapers. They were printed locally and sent out by mail (postage rates were very low for newspapers). Politics was of major interest, with the editor-owner typically deeply involved in local party organizations. However, the paper also contained local news and presented literary columns and book excerpts that catered to an emerging middle class literate audience. A typical rural newspaper provided its readers with a substantial source of national and international news and political commentary, typically reprinted from metropolitan newspapers. The wealthy top fourth of the population purchased subscriptions; the rest listened to readings at a nearby store or tavern.

Generic advertising of medical nostrums and other products typical of that appearing on a preprinted "patent inside" sheet. From Ashtabula Weekly Telegraph Sept. 10, 1880, pg. 7.

Rural weekly papers often used patent insides. Instead of printing four pages on the front and back of a large blank sheet of paper, they printed only pages 1 and 4. Pages 2 and 4 arrived already printed and filled with advertising, essays, fiction, and illustrations. The newsprint was very cheap, and the content proved attractive to women who were not interested in the heavy dose of politics on page 1.

The major metropolitan daily newspapers prepared weekly editions for circulation to the countryside. Most famously the Weekly New York Tribune was jammed with political, economic and cultural news and features, and was a major resource for the local Whig and Republican press. It was a window on the international world and the New York and European cultural scenes.

The expansion of Rural Free Delivery by the U.S. Post Office allowed easier access to daily newspapers to rural areas in the early 20th century and increased support for populist parties and positions.

==== Religion ====
Historian Wayne Flynt notes that rural evangelists in the 19th century significantly supported various political movements challenging the established powers. Starting with the Primitive Baptists who aligned with Jacksonian democracy, rural evangelicals provided critical support to several large-scale uprisings towards the end of the 19th century, such as the Greenback Party, the Grangers, Farmers Alliances, and most notably the Populists of the 1890s. Due to this close relationship, the campaigning technique, the thrilling rhetoric, the mode of organization of mass gatherings, and the psychological techniques of these insurgent movements were heavily influenced by the rural evangelical style and its enormous energy. Southern rural evangelists by the hundreds of thousands could serve as a powerful catalyst for both progressive change and rustic radicalism, for social justice, as well as for racism and traditionalism.

In the 20th century Protestant churches remained a strong force, especially in the rural South where evangelical Baptists and fundamentalists dominated. In each locality the leading families controlled the church and selected the pastor. They gave strong support for prohibition.

==== Farmers organize: Grange and Populism ====
By the late 19th century, farmer movements emerged, typified by the National Grange. They also created new economic roles, especially in forming cooperatives. In the wheat belts and cotton belts they played the central role the 1890s in the Populist Party. They also tried to use politics to gain advantages regarding their grievances with grain elevators and railroad rates.

The merchants in town and the farmers depended upon each other economically, but there remained a we-versus-them tension. When some issues came up, such as taxes or schools, the merchants sided with the town faction. On the railroad question they were on the same side: both complained that rates they paid for manufactured products coming in and for farm products going out were too high. On the issue of grain elevators, the merchants sided with their fellow businessmen.

=== 1890s: Crisis and recovery ===
Prosperity collapsed nationwide in 1893-96, with ruinously low prices for all major farm products. Unemployment soared in the cities. Banks across the land closed down and bankruptcies wiped out assets. Rural America mobilized behind William Jennings Bryan who echoed revivalist religious themes with his powerful denunciation of big business and big banking. He called for "free silver", a device to pump cash into the rural economy to raise prices regardless of its negative impact on urban wages. Bryan defeated the urban conservatives in the Democratic Party for the nomination and also picked up the nomination of the faltering Populist Party based among wheat and cotton farmers. He was decisively defeated by the urban vote for William McKinley, who promised that the gold standard and high tariffs would restore prosperity. In Iowa the incoming Republican Governor L. M. Shaw proclaimed in 1898: "Our industrial and financial skies are brightening [after] the experience of unrest, distrust, doubt, fear, disaster, and much of ruin, through which we have passed."

An important demographic pattern emerged in the 1890s and was repeated in the 1930s. In times of nationwide prosperity there was a steady movement from rural to urban America. During economic depressions the flow reversed, as disappointed and unemployed people left the cities and returned to the family farm.

=== Communal societies ===
Utopian dreamers were active from time to time in American history. One goal was to create communal societies with strictly enforced rules that would lead each member to perfection. They typically chose rural locales. Early 19th century movements included the Oneida Community in upstate New York and Brook Farm in Massachusetts. Most collapsed after a year or two. There was a surprise renewal in the Counterculture of the 1960s.

The Shakers originated in England and relocated to the United States in the 1780s. Because they practiced celibacy, their communities grew primarily through the admission of converts and the adoption of children, including orphans. Between the 1780s and 1850s, they established numerous communal settlements. The Shakers also developed and adopted agricultural technologies intended to improve farm productivity. Among their commercial activities was the production and sale of packaged garden seeds, which were marketed to customer outside their communities and contributed to the development of a wider seed industry.

In the early 20th century a few urban communes were established. Almost all these efforts typically collapsed in a year or two as the members quit. Great success came to the Mormons, but unlike the other utopians they built new cities. The rural utopians chose rural locales to isolate themselves from traditional society and provide subsistence agriculture.

== 20th century ==
=== 1900-1920: The Golden Age of agriculture ===
By 1900 prosperity had indeed returned, and a smashing victory against Spain in a short, popular war guaranteed McKinley's landslide reelection against Bryan. The following years to 1919 were unusually prosperous for rural America: prices were high, and the value of each acre soared. 1900-1914 was a golden age that rural spokesmen used as the ideal standard for the "doctrine of parity" that shaped federal policy for the rest of the 20th century. After taking inflation into account, the gross farm income doubled from 1900 to 1920, and average annual income (after inflation) rose 40%.

=== Roads: Farm to town and town to city ===
In the 19th century rural America made do with poorly maintained muddy dirt roads. According to David R. Wrone, Midwestern roads were as bad in 1910 as they were a century before. They created swirls of dust in the summer, froze into hard grooves in the winter, and transformed into swamps each spring and fall, ensnaring even the strongest horses and the mighty Ford Model T. Agricultural goods could only be sold profitably if they were close to railroad or water transport hubs; carts and wagons could not withstand the relentless pressure of the bumpy roads. Farm horses were unable to handle the continuous effort of trudging through mud, and farmers could not afford the time to make long journeys.

Farmers did not like taxes so there was a system in which local farmers handled the maintenance of their nearby roads. From 1890 to 1930 there was a major effort to upgrade the rural road system, with local, state and national funding. Starting in 1908 farmers took the lead in buying Model T automobiles, making it much easier to bring in supplies and haul out items to sell. It could pull a plow or connect its powerful motor to mechanical devices in the barn, and it was easy to repair. By 1924, there were 6,500,000 farms nationwide, on which farmers operated 4,200,000 Fords and other brands, as well as 370,000 trucks and 450,000 tractors.

Even more important was the commitment to intercity roads, which the merchants wanted. The Post Office entered the fray with Rural Free Delivery in 1906, which enabled farmers to order cheap consumer items from fat catalogs sent out by Montgomery Ward and Sears. In 1908 Sears distributed 3.8 million new catalogs across the country. Rural families relocated outdated catalogs to the outhouse.

=== Consolidation of neighboring farms ===
After 1940 the great majority of small farms were bought out and consolidated in large family-owned corporations. There were family values that played a central role in differentiating those families that managed to stay in farming versus those that were forced to sell and move to town. Key values were family solidarity, fiscal conservatism, diversification of output, careful innovation, and hard work. German and Scandinavian immigrants, having sold their European farms for cash, were eager to invest and expand their family holdings in America. Conversely old stock Yankees were eager to sell and enjoy the cultural advantages of urban living.

In the far suburbs of most major cities, farming activity sharply declined after 1945. Farms were bought up for suburban development and shopping malls, or purchased to become recreational facilities.

=== Rural telephone service ===
AT&T as an urban monopoly usually ignored high-cost, low-profit telephone service to farmers. Many independents operated decentralized, locally owned and locally oriented telephone networks that offered cheaper but mediocre quality service to a small towns and rural areas and did not provide long distance. By 1912 there were 3,200 rural telephone systems, doubling by 1927. Most were not-for-profit cooperatives that were owned by the users who leased the telephones. When the Great Depression hit after 1929 rural farmers were especially likely to discontinue the telephone. In 1949 most farms in the North but few in the South had electricity. Nationally only one in three had a telephone. Starting that year, the Rural Electrification Administration gave out grants and low-interest loans to help local independents to expand the telephone service in rural areas.

=== Southern religion ===
The South has had a majority of its population adhering to evangelical Protestantism ever since the early 19th century as a result of the Second Great Awakening, The upper classes often stayed Episcopalian or Presbyterian. The First Great Awakening starting in the 1740s and the Second Great Awakening ending in the 1850s generated large numbers of Methodist and Baptist converts. These denominations remain the two main Christian confessions in the South. By 1900, the Southern Baptist Convention had become the largest Protestant denomination in the United States with its membership concentrated in rural areas of the South. Baptists are the most common religious group, followed by Methodists, Pentecostals and other denominations. Roman Catholics historically were concentrated in Maryland, Louisiana, and Hispanic areas such as South Texas and South Florida and along the Gulf Coast. The great majority of black Southerners are either Baptist or Methodist. Statistics show that Southern states have the highest religious attendance figures of any region in the United States, constituting the so-called Bible Belt. Pentecostalism has been strong across the South since the late 19th century.

By contrast in the late 20th century urban and suburban South, very large evangelical megachurches emerged. They included tens of thousands of members and numerous clergymen and staffers.

=== Education ===
==== Public schooling 1870s-1940s ====
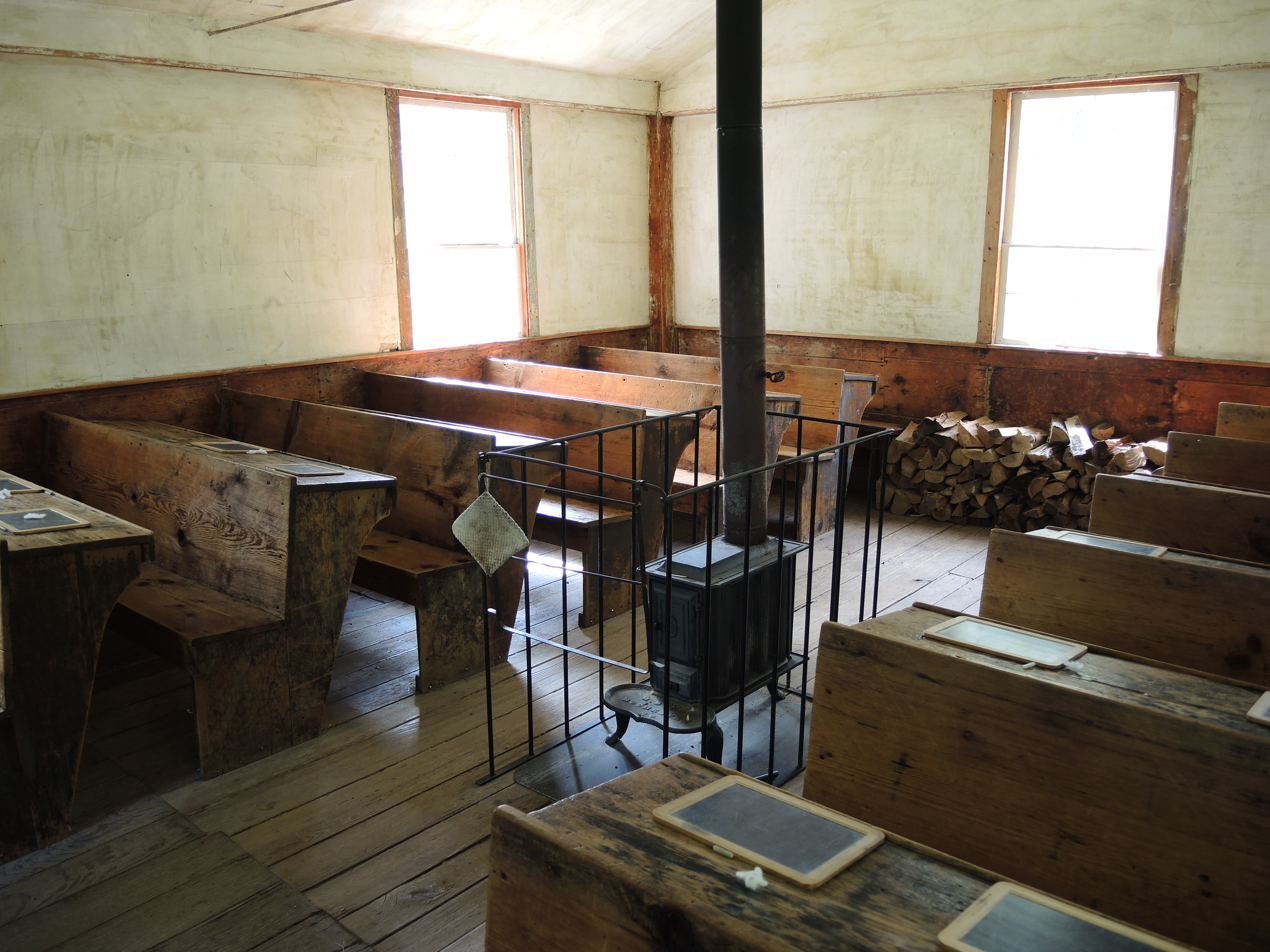
A reconstructed one-room 19th century schoolhouse in rural New York State

In 1930, the nation had 238,000 elementary schools, of which 149,000 were one-room schools wherein one teacher simultaneously handled all students, aged 6 to 16. The teacher was typically the daughter of a local farm family. She averaged four years of training in a nearby high school or normal school. On average, she had two and a half years of teaching experience and planned to continue for another two or three years until she married. She had 22 students enrolled, but on average day only 15 were in attendance. She taught 152 days per year and was paid $874. The students were not divided into grades 1 to 8 but grouped loosely by age. The teacher spent the day moving from group to group, giving them texts to memorize and then listening to their recitations. They did not have homework or tests. The condition of the school buildings ranged from poor to mediocre; they were lucky to have an outhouse. Andrew Gulliford says, "Rural schools were frequently overcrowded, materials were hard to obtain, and repairs and improvements were subject to the financial whims of parsimonious school boards hesitant even to replace dogeared textbooks."

Sharp debates took place in most of the local districts about merging into a consolidated district. Farmers feared loss of control to the experts in towns, and loss of opportunity for their teenage daughters to recoup the family's tax dollars by teaching before getting married.

Iowa lost ground in educational attainment compared to more industrial states, as rural education showed little improvement. Jensen and Friedberger (1976) have examined the impact of education on various socioeconomic factors in Iowa from 1870 to 1930, using individual data from state and federal census manuscripts. Old-stock Protestant populations showed more interest in education than new Catholic or Lutheran immigrants. Household heads were generally less educated than their wives due to demand for women teachers. Family background significantly influenced school attendance and dropout rates. For farmers, education had minimal impact on intergenerational mobility, with inheritance of the family farm being the primary determinant of economic status. In urban areas, education had a more positive effect on economic achievement. Despite the emergence of modern educational mobility channels, traditional opportunities through property accumulation remained more attractive to the average Iowan during this period.

== Country life movement ==
The country life movement was an early 20th century American social movement which sought to improve the living conditions of America's rural residents. It was sponsored by President Theodore Roosevelt and led by Professor Liberty Hyde Bailey. The movement focused on preserving traditional rural lifestyles while addressing poor living conditions and social problems within rural communities. Despite the rural focus, many of its adherents were urbanites who sought to bring progressive changes and technological improvements to rural areas. The main goal was to improve education, with the professionally-run consolidated school replacing the many family-run one-room schools. The movement had little success in changing rural ways of life; its principal successes were the promotion of agricultural extension programs and the development of national organizations to improve rural living.

== Medical issues ==
=== Malaria and hookworm ===
The urban-rural dichotomy has a medical dimension. Two major diseases, malaria and hookworm, historically were largely rural phenomena. They were stamped out by large-scale efforts to clean up the environment. Malaria is spread by the bite of a particular species of mosquito and is eradicated by draining stagnant water.

The Rockefeller Sanitary Commission in 1910 discovered that nearly half the rural people in the poorest parts of the warmer parts of the South were infected with hookworms. The worms live in the small intestine, eat the best food, and leave the victim weak and listless. It was called the "germ of laziness." People were infected by walking barefoot in grassy areas where people defecate. In the long run, outhouses and shoes solved the problem. The commission developed an easy cure: the person took a special medicine, then a strong laxative. The commission helped state health departments set up eradication crusades that treated 440,000 people in 578 counties in all 121 Southern states and ended the epidemic.

=== Medical care ===
The Flexner Report of 1910 made for a radical change in medical education. It emphasized the importance of high quality. university-based, research oriented medical education. It had the result of closing down most of the small proprietary local schools that produced doctors for rural America. In 1938, rural counties without a city of 2,500 people had 69 doctors per 100,000 population, while urban counties with cities of 50,000 or more population had 174. The growing shortage of physicians in rural areas, especially in the South, led to significantly inferior medical care for the populace. Hospital care is still largely based in cities. In 1997, rural areas included 20% of the nation’s population, but fewer than 11% of its physicians.

There was a shortage of Black doctors, almost all of whom before the 1960s were produced by two small programs at Howard University and Meharry Medical College.

== Historiography ==
In historiography, rural history is a field of study focusing on the history of societies in rural areas. It is based in academic history departments, state historical societies, and local museums. At its inception, the field was based on the economic history of agriculture. Since the 1980s it has become increasingly influenced by social history and has diverged from the economic and technological focuses of "agricultural history". It can be considered a counterpart to urban history. Several academic journals and learned societies exist to promote rural history. H-RURAL is a daily discussion group.

As Morton White demonstrates in The Intellectual versus the City: from Thomas Jefferson to Frank Lloyd Wright (1962), the overwhelming consensus of American intellectuals has been hostile to the city. The main idea is the Romantic view that the unspoiled nature of rural America is morally superior to the over civilized cities, which are the natural homes of sharpsters and criminals. American poets did not rhapsodize over the cities. On the contrary they portrayed the metropolis as the ugly scene of economic inequality, crime, drunkenness, prostitution and every variety of immorality. Urbanites were set to rhyme as crafty, overly competitive, artificial, and as having lost too much naturalness and goodness.

== See also ==
- American urban history
- Environmental history of the United States
- History of agriculture in the United States

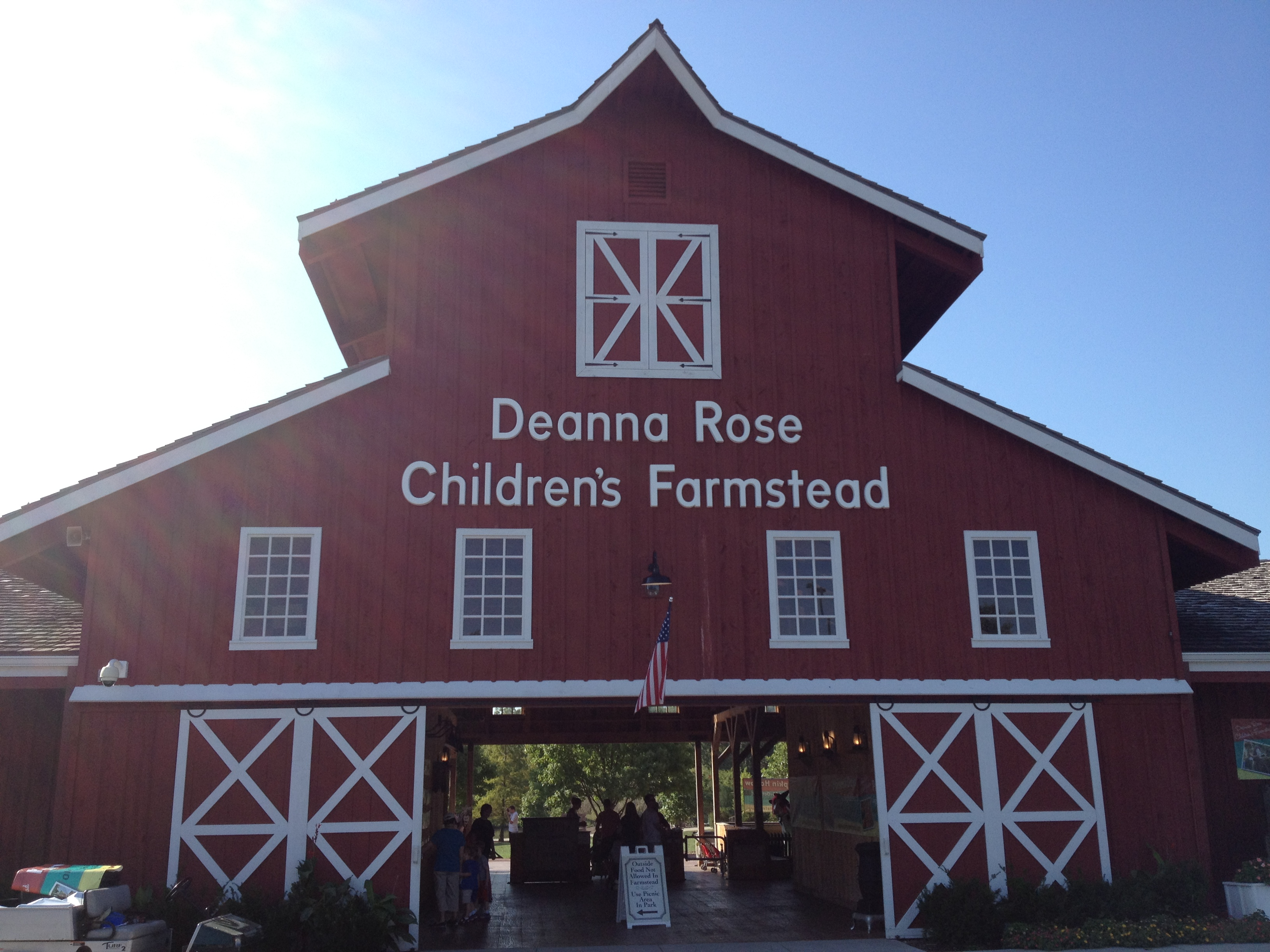
Deanna Rose Children's Farmstead museum in Kansas

- History of the Jews in the Southern United States
- Public health in American history
- Rural areas in the United States
- Rural electrification#United States
- Rural health
- Rural history, research methods done by historians
- Urban–rural political divide, worldwide patterns
- Tennessee Valley Authority, transformation of rural South after 1930s
- Farm museum
  - Deanna Rose Children's Farmstead
  - LSU Rural Life Museum, in Louisiana
  - New Hampshire Farm Museum
  - New Mexico Farm and Ranch Heritage Museum
  - Old World Wisconsin, museum near Milwaukee
  - Rural African American Museum, in Louisiana
