= Rutherford =

Rutherford may refer to:

== Places ==
=== Australia ===
- Rutherford, New South Wales, a suburb of Maitland
- Rutherford (Parish), New South Wales, a civil parish of Yungnulgra County

=== Canada ===
- Mount Rutherford, Jasper National Park
- Rutherford, Edmonton, neighbourhood
- Rutherford House, in Edmonton, Alberta
- Rutherford Library, University of Alberta

=== United Kingdom ===
- Rutherford Appleton Laboratory, Oxfordshire

=== United States ===
- Rutherford, California, in Napa County
- East Rutherford, New Jersey
- Rutherford, New Jersey
- Rutherford, Pennsylvania
- Rutherford, West Virginia
- Rutherford County, North Carolina
- Rutherford County, Tennessee

== People ==
- Rutherford (name), people with the surname or given name

== Fiction ==
- Rutherford the Brave, a character from Gamehendge, the fictional setting for a number of songs by the rock band Phish
- Rutherford, Ohio, fictional setting of the television series 3rd Rock from the Sun
- Cullen Stanton Rutherford, a character from the Dragon Age franchise
- Ensign Sam Rutherford, a major character in Star Trek: Lower Decks
- Rutherford Hall, fictional setting in the detective novel 4:50 from Paddington

== Transportation ==
- Rutherford GO Station, a station in the GO Transit network located in the community of Maple, Ontario, Canada
- Rutherford Intermodal Yard, a large rail yard located in Swatara Township, Dauphin County, just east of Harrisburg, Pennsylvania
- Rutherford (NJT station), a train station on New Jersey Transit's Bergen County Line
- HMS Rutherford (K558), a British frigate in commission in the Royal Navy from 1943 to 1945

== Science ==
- Rutherford (unit), a unit of radioactivity
- Rutherford scattering, a phenomenon in physics which led to the development of the Rutherford model (or planetary model) of the atom and eventually to the Bohr model
- Rutherford (lunar crater), a small impact crater on the Moon's far side
- Rutherford (Martian crater), a crater on Mars

== Economics ==
- R & I.S. Rutherford Brothers of St John's, issued the first traders' Halfpenny tokens for Newfoundland in 1841

== Education ==
- Rutherford College (disambiguation), more than one college
- Rutherford High School (disambiguation), several schools
- Rutherford School (disambiguation), several schools

== Other uses ==
- Rutherford Institute, a public interest law firm and resource center in Charlottesville, Virginia
- The Rutherford Journal, an academic journal
- Rutherford (rocket engine), a rocket engine developed by Rocket Lab
- Rutherford statistical area in Nelson, New Zealand

== See also ==
- John Rutherfoord
- Rutherfurd (disambiguation)
