= Rutterford =

Rutterford is a surname. Notable people with the surname include:

- Alex Rutterford, British director and graphic designer
- Colin Rutterford (born 1943), English cricketer
- Julie Rutterford, British screenwriter

== See also ==
- Rutherford (disambiguation)
