= Pine Grove Community Club =

- U.S. National Register of Historic Places
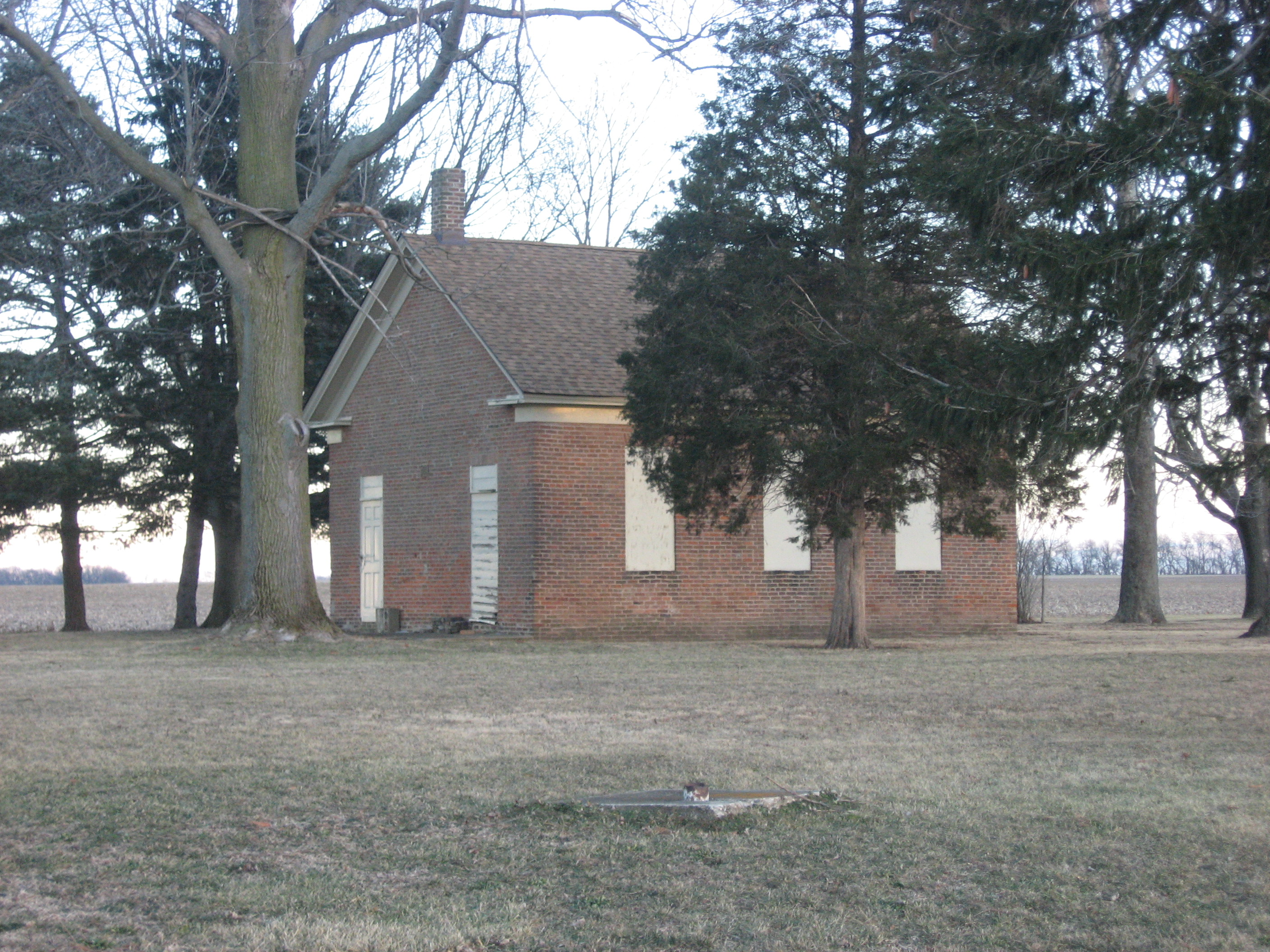
- Western side and front of the club

- Location within Illinois
- Location: Edgar County, Illinois
- Nearest city: Paris
- Coordinates: 39°36′47″N 87°41′38″W
- Area: 1.9 acres (0.77 ha)
- NRHP reference No.: 84001071
- Added to NRHP: March 30, 1984

The Pine Grove Community Club is a historic community club located at the junction of 1500N and 1300E north-northwest of Paris, Illinois. The club originally included two buildings, a brick schoolhouse and a former church; the schoolhouse is the only remaining building on the site.

The school was constructed in the late 1800s, while the church was built in 1891. The club itself was established in the early 1930s as part of a community development program in Edgar County. The program, inspired by the Country Life Movement, sought to develop rural communities such as Pine Grove and improve the quality of life of its residents. While the club initially met in the schoolhouse, it purchased the church for its meetings in 1935 after the congregation folded. The club had 40 members in 1935; the number declined to below 30 by the 1960s, though the club still met as of 1983.

The school building itself operated as District 70 in Edgar County until the county's schools were reorganized in 1948. The former Pine Grove School is now within Paris Community Unit School District No. 4.

The club buildings were added to the National Register of Historic Places on March 30, 1984.

== See also ==
- Rutherfurd Hall
- Vander Wilt Farmstead Historic District
