= Agrarian society =

Community whose economy is based on producing and maintaining crops and farmland

An agrarian society, or agricultural society, is any community whose economy is based on producing and maintaining crops and farmland. Another way to define an agrarian society is by seeing how much of a nation's total production is in agriculture. In agrarian society, cultivating the land is the primary source of wealth. Such a society may acknowledge other means of livelihood and work habits but stresses the importance of agriculture and farming. Agrarian societies have existed in various parts of the world as far back as 10,000 years ago and continue to exist today. They have been the most common form of socio-economic organization for most of recorded human history.

== History ==
Agrarian society was preceded by hunters and gatherers and horticultural societies and transitioned into industrial society. The transition to agriculture, called the Neolithic Revolution, has taken place independently multiple times. Horticulture and agriculture as types of subsistence developed among humans somewhere between 10,000 and 8,000 years ago in the Fertile Crescent region of the Middle East. The reasons for the development of agriculture are debated but may have included climate change, and the accumulation of food surplus for competitive gift-giving. Most certainly there was a gradual transition from hunter-gatherer to agricultural economies after a lengthy period when some crops were deliberately planted and other foods were gathered from the wild. An example of this transition can be found in the cultivation of wild cereals by hunter-gatherers in the Central Sahara. Between 7500 BC and 3500 BC, undomesticated central Saharan flora were farmed, stored, and cooked, while domesticated animals (e.g., Barbary sheep) were milked and managed, by hunter-gatherers near the Takarkori rockshelter, which is representative of the broader Sahara; this continued until the beginning of the Pastoral Neolithic in the Sahara. In addition to the emergence of farming in the Fertile Crescent, agriculture appeared: by at least 6,800 BC in East Asia (rice) and, later, in Central and South America (maize and squash). Small-scale agriculture also likely arose independently in early Neolithic contexts in India (rice) and Southeast Asia (taro). However, full dependency on domestic crops and animals, when wild resources contributed a nutritionally insignificant component to the diet, did not occur until the Bronze Age.

Agriculture allows a much greater density of population than can be supported by hunting and gathering and allows for the accumulation of excess product to keep for winter use or to sell for profit. The ability of farmers to feed large numbers of people whose activities have nothing to do with material production was the crucial factor in the rise of surplus, specialization, advanced technology, hierarchical social structures, inequality, and standing armies. Agrarian societies thus support the emergence of a more complex social structure.

In agrarian societies, some of the simple correlations between social complexity and environment begin to disappear. One view is that humans with this technology have moved a large step toward controlling their environments, are less dependent on them, and hence show fewer correlations between environment and technology-related traits. A rather different view is that as societies become larger and the movement of goods and people cheaper, they incorporate an increasing range of environmental variation within their borders and trade system. But environmental factors may still play a strong role as variables that affect the internal structure and history of a society in complex ways. For example, the average size of agrarian states will depend on the ease of transportation, major cities will tend to be located at trade nodes, and the demographic history of a society may depend on disease episodes.

Until recent decades, the transition to farming was seen as an inherently progressive one: people learnt that planting seeds caused crops to grow, and this new improved food source led to larger populations, sedentary farm and town life, more leisure time and so to specialization, writing, technological advances and civilization. It is now clear that agriculture was adopted despite certain disadvantages of that lifestyle. Archeological studies show that health deteriorated in populations that adopted cereal agriculture, returning to pre-agricultural levels only in modern times. This is in part attributable to the spread of infection in crowded cities, but is largely due to a decline in dietary quality that accompanied intensive cereal farming. People in many parts of the world remained hunter-gatherers until quite recently; though they were quite aware of the existence and methods of agriculture, they declined to undertake it. Many explanations have been offered, usually centered around a particular factor that forced the adoption of agriculture, such as environmental or population pressure. Main source of income was cultivation and farming.

== In the modern world ==
Agrarian societies transition into industrial societies when less than half of their population is directly engaged in agricultural production. Such societies started appearing because of the Commercial and Industrial Revolution which can be seen beginning in the Mediterranean city-states from 1000 to 1500 CE. As European societies developed during the Middle Ages, classical knowledge was reacquired from scattered sources, and a new series of maritime commercial societies developed again in Europe. The initial developments were centered in Northern Italy, in the city-states of Venice, Florence, Milan, and Genoa. By about 1500 a few of these city-states probably met the requirements of having half of their populations engaged in non-agricultural pursuits and became commercial societies. These small states were highly urbanized, imported much food, and were centers of trade and manufacture to a degree quite unlike typical agrarian societies.

The culminating development, still in progress, was the development of industrial technology, the application of mechanical sources of energy to an ever-increasing number of production problems. By about 1800, the agricultural population of Britain had sunk to about one third of the total. By mid-19th century, all the countries of Western Europe, plus the United States of America had more than half their populations in non-farm occupations. Even today, the Industrial Revolution is far from completely replacing agrarianism with industrialism. Only a minority of the world's population today live in industrialized societies although most predominantly agrarian societies have a significant industrial sector.

The use of crop breeding, better management of soil nutrients, and improved weed control have greatly increased yields per unit area. At the same time, the use of mechanization has decreased labor input. The developing world generally produces lower yields, having less of the latest science, capital, and technology base. More people in the world are involved in agriculture as their primary economic activity than in any other activity, yet it only accounts for four percent of the world's GDP. The rapid rise of mechanization in the 20th century, especially in the form of the tractor, reduced the necessity of humans performing the demanding tasks of sowing, harvesting, and threshing. With mechanization, these tasks could be performed with a speed and on a scale barely imaginable before. These advances have resulted in a substantial increase in the yield of agricultural techniques that have also translated into a decline in the percentage of populations in developed countries that are required to work in agriculture to feed the rest of the population.

== Demographics ==
The main demographic consequences of agrarian technology were simply a continuation of the trend toward higher population densities and larger settlements. The latter is probably a more secure consequence of agrarian technology than the former. In principle livestock compete with humans for food and in some environments, advanced horticultural techniques can probably support more people per square kilometer than agrarian techniques.

Aside from average density, agrarian technology permitted urbanization of population to a greater extent than was possible under horticulture for two reasons. First, settlement sizes grew with agrarian technology because more productive farmers freed more people for urban specialty occupations. Second, land and maritime transportation improvements made it possible to supply great cities of 1,000,000, plus inhabitants such as Rome, Baghdad, and the Chinese capital cities. Rome, for example, could obtain grain and other bulk raw materials from Sicily, North Africa, Egypt, and Southern France to sustain large populations, even by modern standards. This required maritime transport on the Mediterranean. It is productivity per unit of labor and transport efficiency improvements of agrarian technology that had the widest impact on the more peripheral culture core features of agrarian societies.

The populations of agrarian societies have historically fluctuated substantially around the slowly rising trend line, due to famines, disease epidemics and political disruption. At least at the high points, population densities often seem to have exceeded the level at which everyone could be productively employed at current levels of technology. Malthusian deterioration, under-employment and a decline in rural and lower-class urban standards of living, ensued.

== Social organization ==
Agrarian societies are especially noted for their extremes of social classes and rigid social mobility. As land is the major source of wealth, social hierarchy develops based on landownership and not labor in what is often characterized as feudalism. The system of stratification is characterized by three coinciding contrasts: governing class versus the masses, urban minority versus peasant majority, and literate minority versus illiterate majority. This results in two distinct subcultures; the urban elite versus the peasant masses. Moreover, this means that cultural differences within agrarian societies are greater than the differences between them.

The landowning strata typically combine government, religious, and military institutions to justify and enforce their ownership, and support elaborate patterns of consumption, slavery, serfdom, or peonage is commonly the lot of the primary producer. Rulers of agrarian societies do not manage their empire for the common good or in the name of the public interest, but as a piece of property they own and can do with as they please. Caste systems, as found in India, are much more typical of agrarian societies where lifelong agricultural routines depend upon a rigid sense of duty and discipline. The emphasis in the modern West on personal liberties and freedoms was in large part a reaction to the steep and rigid stratification of agrarian societies.

== Energy ==
Within agrarian societies, the primary source of energy is plant biomass. This means that like hunter-gatherer societies, agrarian societies are dependent on natural solar energy flows. Thus agrarian societies are characterized by their dependence on outside energy flows, low energy density, and the limited possibilities of converting one energy form into another. Energy radiating from the sun is primarily caught and chemically fixed by plant photosynthesis. Then it is secondarily converted by animals and, finally, processed for human use. Unlike hunter-gatherers, agrarianism's basic strategy is to control these flows. For this purpose, agrarian systems mainly use living organisms which serve as food, tools, building material. Mechanical devices making use of wind or running water also can be used to convert natural energy flows. The amount of energy an agrarian society can use is restricted due to the low energy density of solar radiation and the low efficiency of technology.

To increase production, an agrarian society must either increase the intensity of production or obtain more land for expansion. Expansion may take place either by claiming territories occupied by other communities, but expansion also may take place by claiming new ecological niches from other living species. Societies are limited by a diminishing margin of utility in that the best lands for farming are usually already under cultivation, forcing people to move into less and less arable lands.

== Agrarianism ==
Agrarianism most often refers to a social philosophy which values agrarian society as superior to industrial society and stresses the superiority of a simpler rural life as opposed to the complexity and chaos of urbanized, industrialized life. In this view the farmer is idealized as self-sufficient and thus independent as opposed to the paid laborer who is vulnerable and alienated in modern society. Moreover, Agrarianism usually links working the land with morality and spiritualty and links urban life, capitalism, and technology with a loss of independence and dignity while fostering vice and weakness. The agricultural community, with its fellowship of labor and cooperation, is thus the model society.

Agrarianism is similar but not identical with back-to-the-land movements. Agrarianism concentrates on the fundamental goods of the earth, communities of more limited economic and political scale than in modern society, and on simple living—even when this shift involves questioning the "progressive" character of some recent social and economic developments. Thus agrarianism is not industrial farming, with its specialization on products and industrial scale.

== See also ==
- Agrarian socialism
- Agrarian system
- Developing country
- Pre-industrial society
- Rural history
- Rural American history
- Traditional society

== Bibliography ==
- Barth, F. 2001. Features of Person and Society under Agrarianism: Collected Essays. London: Routledge & Kegan Paul.
- Brown, D.E. 1988. Hierarchy, History, and Human Nature: The Social Origins of Historical Consciousness. Tucson: University of Arizona Press.
- Cohen, M. N. 1989. Health and the Rise of Civilization. New Haven: Yale University Press.
- Johnson, A. W. 2000. The Evolution of Human Societies: from Foraging Group to Agrarian State. Stanford: Stanford University Press.
- Langlois, S. 2001. "Traditions: Social." In Neil J. Smelser and Paul B. Baltes, Editors, International Encyclopedia of the Social & Behavioral Sciences, Pergamon, Oxford, 15829–15833.
- Lenski, Gerhard. "Agrarian Societies [Parts I & II]." In Power and Privilege: A Theory of Social Stratification, 189–296. 1966. Reprinted, Chapel Hill: University of North Carolina Press, 1984.
- Nolan, Patrick, and Gerhard Lenski. 2014. "The Agricultural Economy." In Human Societies: An Introduction to Macrosociology, 156–201. 12th ed. New York: Oxford University Press.
- Pryor, F. L. 2006. "The Adoption of Agriculture: Some Theoretical and Empirical Evidence." American Anthropologist 88:879–97.
- Renfrew, C. (ed.) 1993. The Explanation of Culture Change. Pittsburgh: University of Pittsburgh Press.
- Thompson, Paul B. 2010. The Agrarian Vision: Sustainability and Environmental Ethics. Lexington: University of Kentucky Press.
