= Vander Wilt Farmstead Historic District =

Historic district in Iowa, United States

- U.S. National Register of Historic Places
- U.S. Historic district
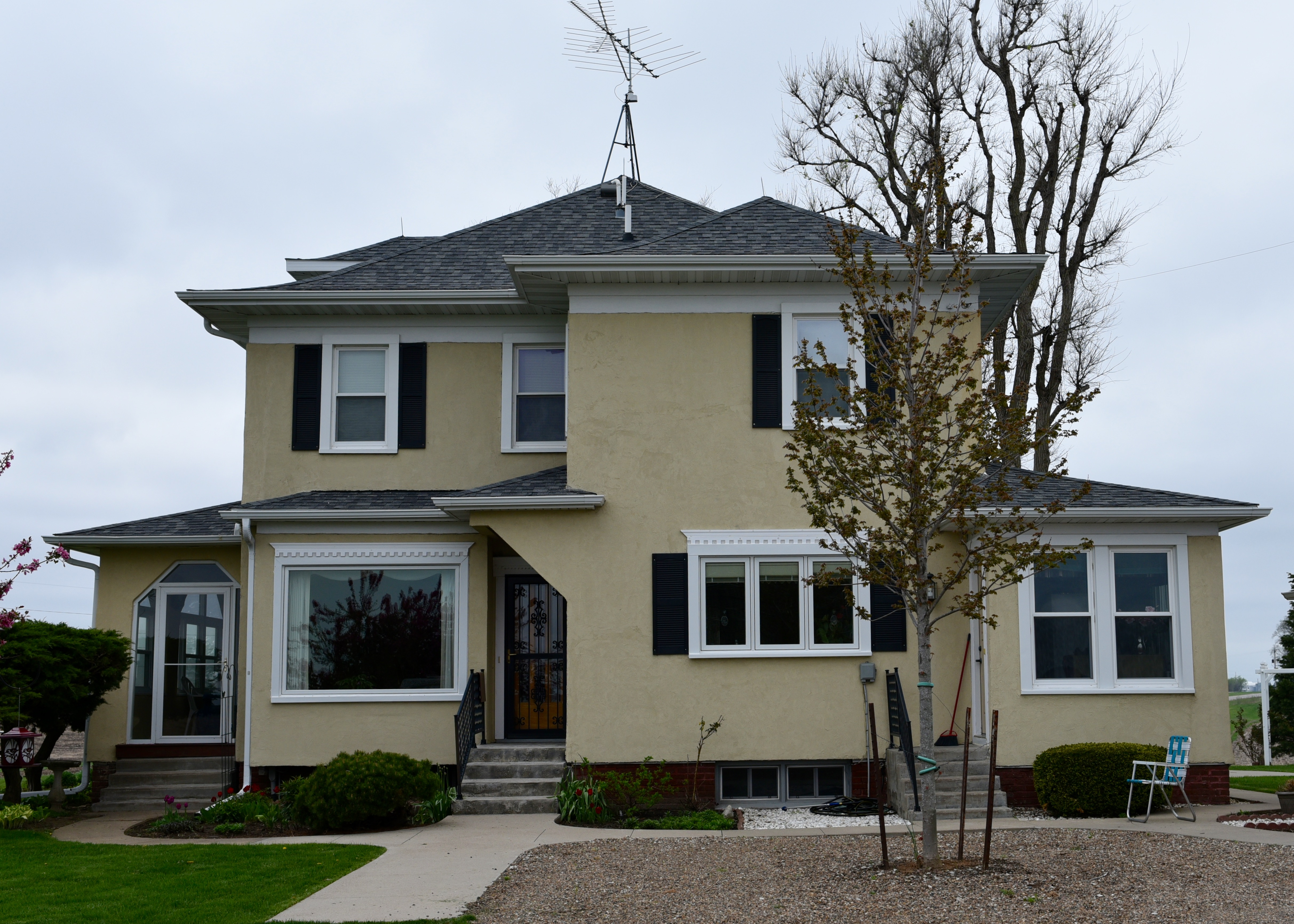
- Farmhouse

- Location within Iowa Location within the United States
- Location: 1345 Iowa Highway 163, Sec. 22, T26N, R17W, SW of NE
- Nearest city: Leighton, Iowa
- Coordinates: 41°22′22″N 92°48′11″W
- Area: 9 acres (3.6 ha)
- Built by: Douwe Sjaardema; Iowa Concrete Crib and Silo Co.
- Architectural style: Late 19th and Early 20th Century American Movements
- NRHP reference No.: 03001370
- Added to NRHP: January 8, 2004

The Vander Wilt Farmstead Historic District, also known as the Heritage House Bed and Breakfast, is an agricultural historic district located north of Leighton, Iowa, United States. At the time of its nomination it included three contributing buildings, three contributing structures, one non-contributing building, and two non-contributing structures. The significance of the district is attributed to its association with progressive farming and the Country Life Movement, which sought to improve the living conditions of rural residents. The contributing buildings include the 1904 barn, the house (1920), the corn crib (1953), dairy barn (1955) and the feed lots. The two-story house was built by Douwe Sjaardema, a contractor from Pella, Iowa. The corn crib was built by the Iowa Concrete Crib & Silo Co. of Des Moines. The farm also includes a former landing strip for airplanes. It featured a 1,500-foot (460 m) grass runway where cows grazed on certain days. At one time it had a windsock and homemade landing lights. A hangar, no longer in existence, had been built in 1955. An automobile garage and two silos are the non-contributing resources. The district was listed on the National Register of Historic Places in 2004. The 1904 barn has subsequently been torn down.

== See also ==
- Pine Grove Community Club
- Rutherfurd Hall
