= Overland Park Police Department =

Municipal police department in Kansas, U.S.

- Abbreviation: OPPD

Agency overview
- Formed: 1960; 66 years ago
- Annual budget: $52,506,089 (2024)

Jurisdictional structure
- Operations jurisdiction: Overland Park, Kansas, United States
- Legal jurisdiction: City of Overland Park
- General nature: Local civilian police

Operational structure
- Police officers: c. 300 (December 2021)
- Civilian employees: 55
- Agency executive: Doreen Jokerst, Chief of Police

The Overland Park Police Department is a local police department in Kansas and is located in Johnson County, Kansas. The department was known as Mission Township Police Department prior to 1960.

== History ==
The Overland Park Police Department (OPPD) was formed in 1960 when the Mission Township Police Department disbanded and became the Overland Park Police Department. The department was also formed when Overland Park became a "first class city".

=== Officers killed in the line of duty ===
On January 19, 1968, a Kansas Highway Patrol Sergeant, Eldon K. Miller, was shot and killed in Overland Park, marking the first law enforcement death in the city since its incorporation. The incident began when four individuals, led by Henry Floyd Brown, placed a soda can packed with five half-sticks of dynamite outside Overland Park's City Hall. Soon after being placed, the device exploded, causing $3,000 worth of damage to a brick wall and air conditioning unit. The explosion was meant to divert attention from a bank robbery they had planned nearby. After placing the explosive, the four men proceeded to the nearby Metcalf State Bank, near the intersection of 79th Street and Metcalf Avenue. The men left the bank with $13,000 in cash, and a chase by Overland Park Police ensued. An Overland Park Police motorcycle officer was wounded after being shot with a rifle during the chase, and the suspects were then found in the Heatherwood apartment complex when officers found the getaway vehicle used in the robbery. Following the discovery, officers set up a perimeter around the apartment complex, and Trooper Miller hopped in a Johnson County Sheriff's Office patrol car and used the patrol car to cover other officers from gunfire. As he was moving the vehicle, the suspects started shooting, and gunfire hit Trooper Miller in the head, killing him immediately. The suspects were arrested and sent to prison.

Three Overland Park officers have been killed in the line of duty. Officer Deanna H. Rose was killed on January 6, 1985, when she was in the process of attempting to arrest 19-year-old Kenneth Meunier for drunk driving. As she tried to arrest him, he knocked her down, got in his car, and ran her over; she died two days later. He was later arrested for the crime and went to prison, but was eventually released. She was the first female police officer killed in the state of Kansas. The Deanna Rose Children's Farmstead was renamed in her honor.

The second was on May 4, 2020, when Officer Michael Mosher was killed after he witnessed a hit and run and pursued the vehicle involved. Following a brief chase, Officer Mosher and the suspect exchanged gunfire, and both died as a result.

In 2021, Officer Freddie Castro contracted COVID-19 while on duty for the Overland Park Police Department. Officer Castro would then go on to pass away from complications due to COVID-19.

=== Killing of John Albers ===
On January 20, 2018, OPPD Officer Clayton Jenison shot and killed 17-year-old John Albers while he was investigating a call in which Albers was threatening to commit suicide. Friends of Albers, who were concerned about his health and safety, called 911 to report that John was threatening to harm himself. When the officers arrived, they waited outside of the house for a few minutes before waiting for other officers before approaching. Officer Jenison parked down the street, walked up to the house, walked in the front yard, and was approaching the garage door when it began to open. John had opened the garage and was backing out of his garage in his mom's Honda Odyssey minivan when Officer Jenison felt that his life was in danger and fired two rounds from his department-issued sidearm. However, the van then did a 180-degree turn somewhat in reverse, and then Officer Jenison fired 11 more rounds, having fired 13 rounds total. The van then rolled down the driveway and into the street before stopping across the street in another house's front yard. Officers then approached the van to give aid to John following the shooting, but the injuries would prove to be fatal. John Albers was declared dead on the scene and had been shot multiple times by Officer Jenison.

Officer Jenison would be cleared in the shooting by the Johnson County District Attorney, Steve Howe, who said the officer acted within Kansas Law when he opened fire. Officer Jenison, however, would leave the department following a buyout that was negotiated for $81,040, which included $70,000 for severance pay and an additional $11,040 for his regular salary. Following the shooting, the OPPD updated their policy in regards to firing at moving vehicles in order to hopefully prevent a similar incident from happening again. John's mother, Sheila Albers, filed a federal lawsuit following the shooting, which was settled with the city in 2019 for $2.3 million. The FBI also started an investigation into the shooting. Former OPPD Chief Frank Donchez has also been criticized by Sheila Albers due to his handling of the incident, which she claims involved him protecting "bad policing" and that he had "misled the public". However, following an investigation by the Kansas Commission on Police Officers Standards and Training (CPOST), Sheila Albers was told that no action would be taken against Chief Donchez. Sheila Albers has called it "shameful" that no action was taken against Donchez. In April 2021, the city of Overland Park released a 500-page document which showed pictures of evidence, crime scene, dashcam, and more information in regards to the shooting of John Albers.

In September 2023, Frank Donchez resigned as police chief following a confrontation with Sheila Albers. After the confrontation, Albers wrote an email to the mayor and city manager that detailed claims that Donchez had disparaged her parenting and did not refute having lied about when Officer Jenison left the department. After having received her email, the city leaders began Donchez's termination process. Deputy Chief Simon Happer was appointed as the interim police chief after Donchez's departure.

=== Overland Park Police Officers Foundation controversy ===
The Overland Park Police Officers Foundation was formed in 2016 to help the families of the department's officers in their times of crisis. In January 2022, the Overland Park Fraternal Order of Police requested a forensic audit of the foundation, leading to an investigation that revealed three sergeants and an officer (who served in roles as president, treasurer, secretary, and director) had violated the bylaws and misdirected approximately $27,000 in charitable funds for their personal use, including family scholarships, travel, and veterinary bills. In May 2022, the officers were placed on paid administrative leave for roughly a year and a half before they resigned from the department in December 2023. The Johnson County District Attorney investigated and called the officers actions "shadowy", but ultimately declined to pursue charges against the four, stating that the bylaws could be casually changed and were so broadly written that the actions of the former board members were not criminal. The Kansas Attorney General's Office secured civil consent judgments against all four former board members in 2025. These judgments resulted in court orders to repay damages, investigative costs, and civil penalties, alongside permanent bans from participating in Kansas charitable governance or fundraising.

=== Department's first female chief ===
On October 14, 2024, Doreen Jokerst was sworn in as the department's first female police chief.

== Divisions ==
- Communications
- Crisis Action Team (CAT)
- Investigations
- Traffic Unit
- Tactical Response (SWAT)
- School resource officers
- Diving Unit
- Records and Fingerprinting
- Community Policing
- Explorers Program
- Citizen's Police Academy

== Current duty equipment ==
- Glock Model 17 Gen 5 9mm
- Glock Model 19 9mm (preferred by detectives and command staff. Some officers can carry it if they prefer the more compact pistol over the full size Model 17)
- Taser
- Pepper Spray
- ASP, Inc. Baton
- Daniel Defense CQBR 5.56x45mm - Replaced CZ Scorpion Evo in service with SWAT
- Benelli M1 12 Gauge- replaced Remington 870
- Daniel Defense AR-15 5.56×45mm NATO Patrol Rifle - replaced the Rock River Arms AR-15 previously in use.

== Previous duty equipment ==
- Glock Model 22 .40 S&W- was replaced in 2020 by the Glock Model 17 as the standard sidearm for patrol officers. The Glock Model 22 had been in service since the early 2000s (approx. 2001–2002). The agency used the Gen 3 model up until around 2011 before going to the Gen 4 model.
- Glock Model 23 .40 S&W- was replaced in 2020 by the Glock Model 19 as the weapon for command staff, detectives and officers who prefer the more compact size pistol rather than carry the full size Glock. Like the Glock Model 22 it was in service since the early 2000s. The agency used the Gen 3 model up until around 2011 before going to the Gen 4 model.
- Beretta 92 9mm- was replaced by the Glock Model 22 as the standard sidearm in the early 2000s. It had been in service for about 8–10 years and was issued out with 2 spare 15 round magazines.
- Heckler & Koch MP5 9mm- was used by the SWAT unit for over 20 years before being replaced a few years ago by the CZ Scorpion Evo 3.
- Remington 870 12 Gauge- was used as a patrol shotgun before being replaced by the newer Benelli M3 shotguns. It was also used by SWAT in the 1980s and 1990s with a top folding stock to be more versatile for the needs of the SWAT unit.
- Taser Model X26- was used but was replaced by a newer model of Taser.

== Vehicles ==
- Ford Explorer (current)- The agency also has a few 2020 Explorer's purchased in addition to the 2014-2019 model years also in use.
- Dodge Durango (current)- Purchased in 2019 as an alternative to the Ford Explorer.
- Ford Taurus - Being phased out; was used but officers preferred the more space in the Explorer.
- Lenco BearCat (Tactics Team)
- Farber Specialty Vehicles - Custom Mobile Command Post. Additional information the vehicle is equipped with dispatch capabilities, a 42- foot mast with a camera, and eight workstations, including one for a Public Information Officer.
- Ford F-150 - Use within the traffic unit for commercial vehicle inspections and motorist assistance.
- Ford Crown Victoria - No longer in service.
