= Rutherfurd Hall =

Historic house in New Jersey, United States

- U.S. National Register of Historic Places
- U.S. Historic district
- New Jersey Register of Historic Places
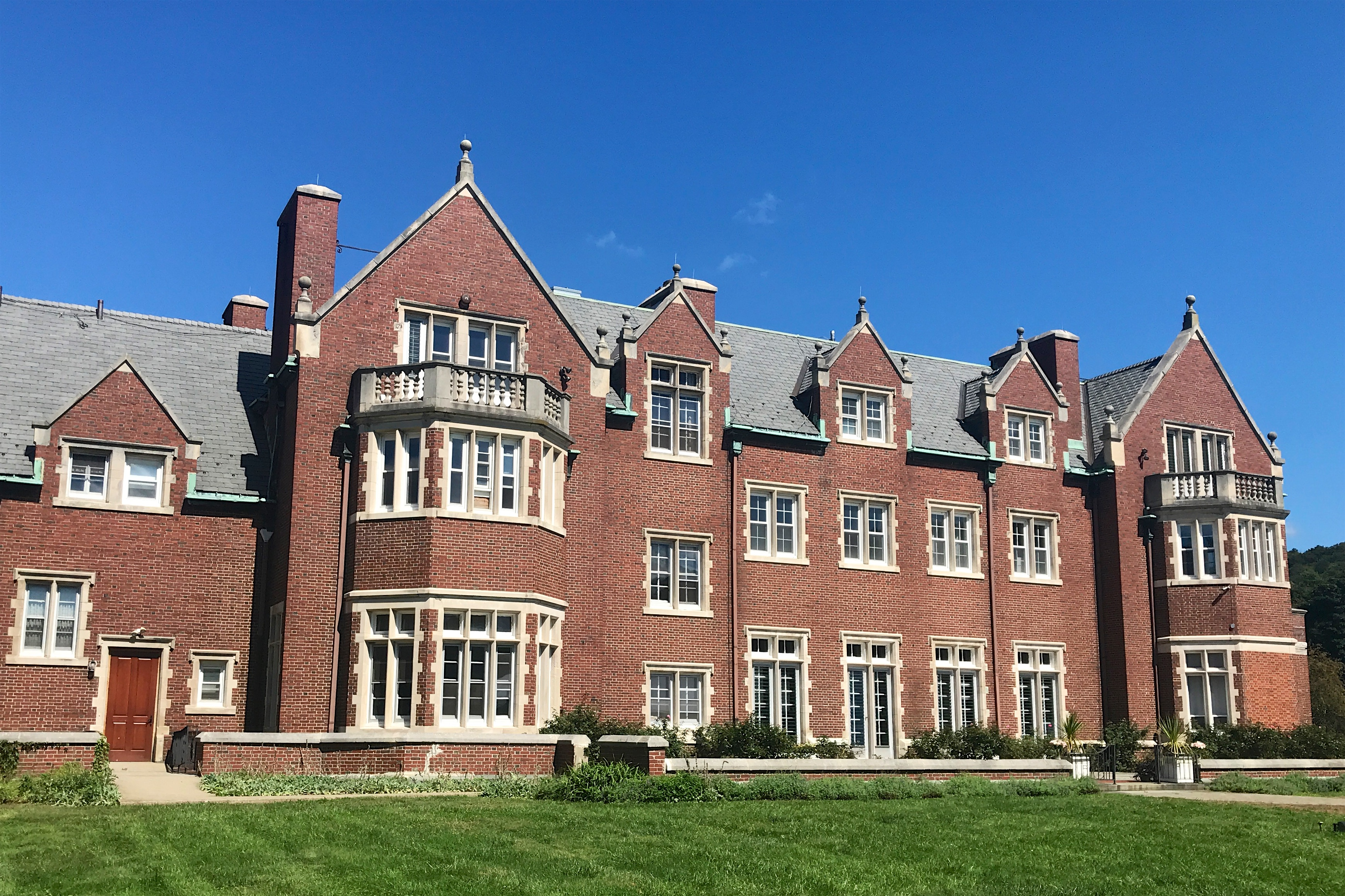

- Location within Warren County, New Jersey Location within New Jersey Location within the United States
- Location: 1686 Route 517, Allamuchy Township, New Jersey
- Coordinates: 40°54′52″N 74°48′48″W
- Area: 34.4 acres (13.9 ha)
- Built: 1902
- Architect: Whitney Warren
- Architectural style: Tudor Revival
- NRHP reference No.: 11000592
- NJRHP No.: 4562

Significant dates
- Added to NRHP: April 24, 2013
- Designated NJRHP: June 2, 2011

Rutherfurd Hall is a historic house located in Allamuchy Township, Warren County, New Jersey, US.

The property was added as a historic district to the National Register of Historic Places on April 24, 2013, for its significance in architecture and social history.

== History ==
Rutherfurd Hall was the estate of husband and wife Winthrop Chanler Rutherfurd and Alice Morton Rutherfurd. After Alice's death from appendicitis, Rutherfurd married his second wife Lucy Mercer Rutherfurd. Construction began in 1902 and included a mansion, gardens, boathouse, swimming beach, hydroelectric powerhouse, 9-hole golf course, and kennels.

Rutherfurd Hall is one of the last extant large country estates in New Jersey constructed at the turn of the 20th century, and represents the country life movement which began in America following the Civil War, when the wealthy constructed large estates in rustic settings near major cities. President Franklin Delano Roosevelt visited the estate in the 1940s to meet with Lucy Rutherfurd.

In 1948, the property was donated to the Congregation of the Daughters of Divine Charity, who used it initially as a retreat and training center. Known as "Villa Madonna" during this time, the Daughters later used the building as a rest home for retired nuns. An additional wing was added to the mansion in 1959.

The passage of the 2004 Highlands Water Protection and Planning Act, which placed the property in the highly development-restricted Preservation Area, dashed hopes by the religious order to sell the property to speculative development interests and they brought suit against the State of New Jersey. The Highlands Act was upheld in court, yet this contentious action eventually yielded to the more appropriate land use that exists today in which the historic character of the former estate and the integrity of the Highlands natural resources are maintained under the current ownership and the adaptive reuse of the property.

The property was sold to the State of New Jersey and the Allamuchy Township School District in 2007.

In 2013, the State of New Jersey awarded $50,000 to the school district for a preservation project at Rutherfurd Hall.

== Design ==
The mansion was designed by Whitney Warren, and is a Tudor Revival brick and stone structure occupying three floors, with approximately 38 rooms. It has been expanded to an additional 50 rooms. The grounds were designed by the Olmsted Brothers, with the intent of creating a picturesque landscape of "well-kept, simple neatness."

== Current use ==
Rutherfurd Hall is owned and managed by the Allamuchy Township School District, and is used as a community education and cultural facility. The general information phone number is (908) 852–1894. It is also rented for private functions. The Rutherfurd Hall Foundation supports projects at the site.

The property is located next to Allamuchy Mountain State Park.

== See also ==
- Pine Grove Community Club
- Vander Wilt Farmstead Historic District
- National Register of Historic Places listings in Warren County, New Jersey
