= Rural areas in the United States =

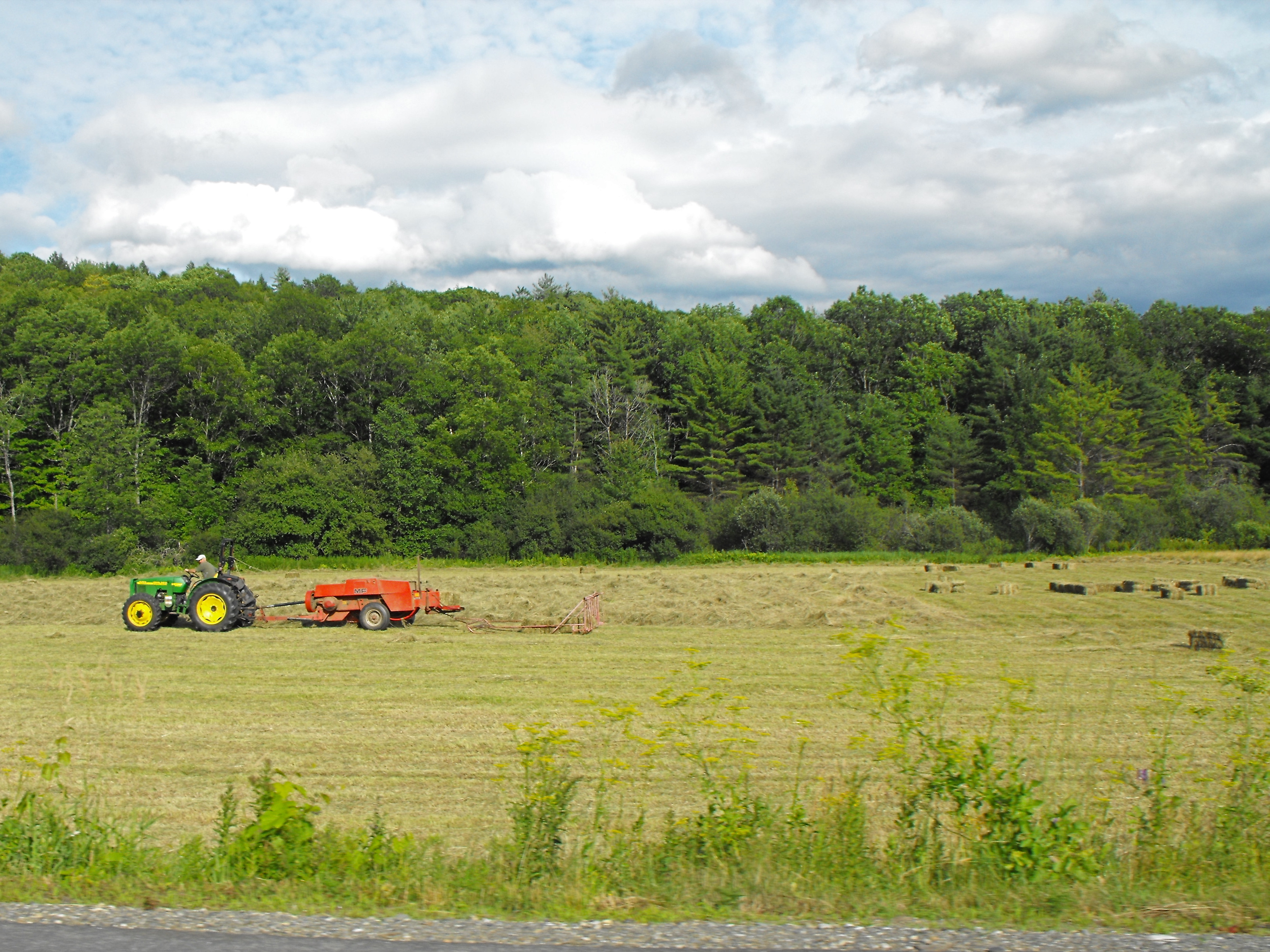
Westminster, Vermont

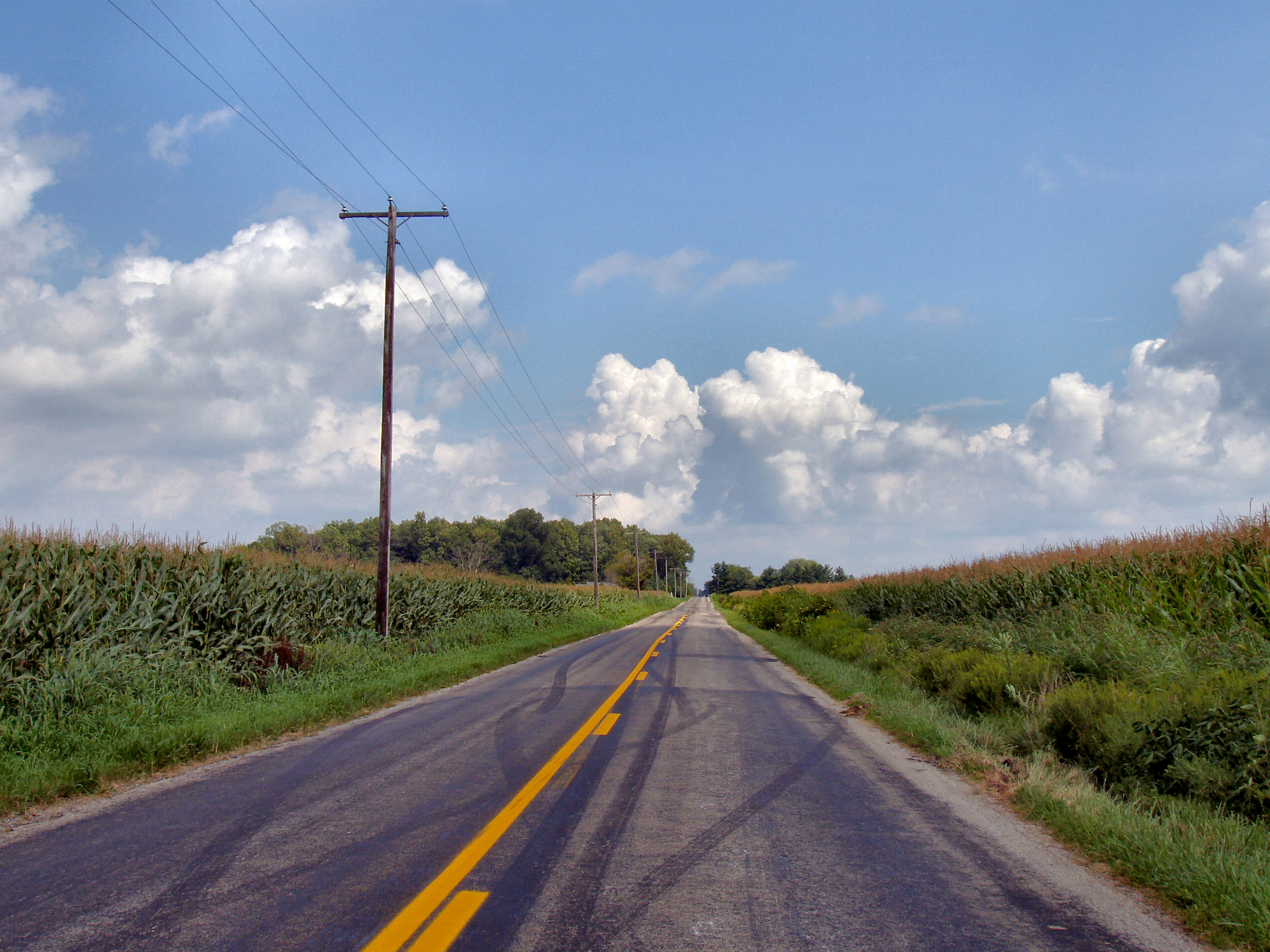
A rural country road in Marshall County, Indiana

Rural areas in the United States, often referred to as rural America, consist of approximately 97% of the United States' land area. An estimated 60 million people, or one in five residents (17.9% of the U.S. population), live in rural America. Definitions vary from different parts of the United States government as to what constitutes those areas.

Rural areas tend to be poorer and their populations older than in other parts of the United States because of rural flight, declining infrastructure, and fewer economic prospects. The declining population also results in less access to services, such as high-quality medical and education systems.

== Definitions ==
The United States Census Bureau defines rural areas as sparsely populated and far from urban centers, which make up an estimated 3% of the land area but are home to more than 80% of the population. The United States Office of Management and Budget defines rural areas by county; some rural areas are classified into metropolitan counties, and others are spread throughout the numerous micropolitan statistical areas. The Census Bureau updates their definition following each decennial census.

The U.S. Department of Agriculture has four different systems for defining rural areas: Frontier and Remote (FAR) area codes, which define rural areas in four levels of increasing remoteness by ZIP code, Rural–Urban Commuting Areas (RUCA), Urban Influence Codes (UICs), and Rural-Urban Continuum Codes (RUCC).

The United States Department of Health and Human Services has two agencies that define rural areas. The Health Resources and Services Administration addresses the shortcomings of the U.S. Census Bureau, the U.S. Office of Management and Budget, and RUCA definitions to produce a definition that is balanced between them. The Centers for Medicare & Medicaid Services uses its own definition for setting Medicare payment rates. CityLab defines rural areas by congressional district, based on census tracts and a machine-learning algorithm.

== History ==
Rural America was the center of the Populist movement in the 1880s and 1890s. Farmers tried to address their issues using co-ops and the National Grange movement. They failed to achieve national success, and the movement came to an end following the two defeats of William Jennings Bryan, in 1896 and 1900.

Since the 1940s and 1950s, the rural districts of the northern United States have largely been a stronghold for the Republican Party. The rural South turned Republican in the 1990s. A notable exception in recent years is Vermont. Despite being one of the most rural states in the country, Vermont has been a Democratic Party stronghold since the 1960s. It was Joe Biden's strongest state in the 2020 United States presidential election and Kamala Harris' strongest in the 2024 United States presidential election.

== Demographics ==
Most rural counties are experiencing persistent population decline. Compared with households in urban areas, rural households had lower median household income ($52,386 compared with $54,296), lower median home values ($151,300 compared with $190,900), and lower monthly housing costs for households paying a mortgage ($1,271 compared with $1,561). A higher percentage owned their housing units "free and clear," with no mortgage or loan (44.0 percent compared with 32.3 percent).

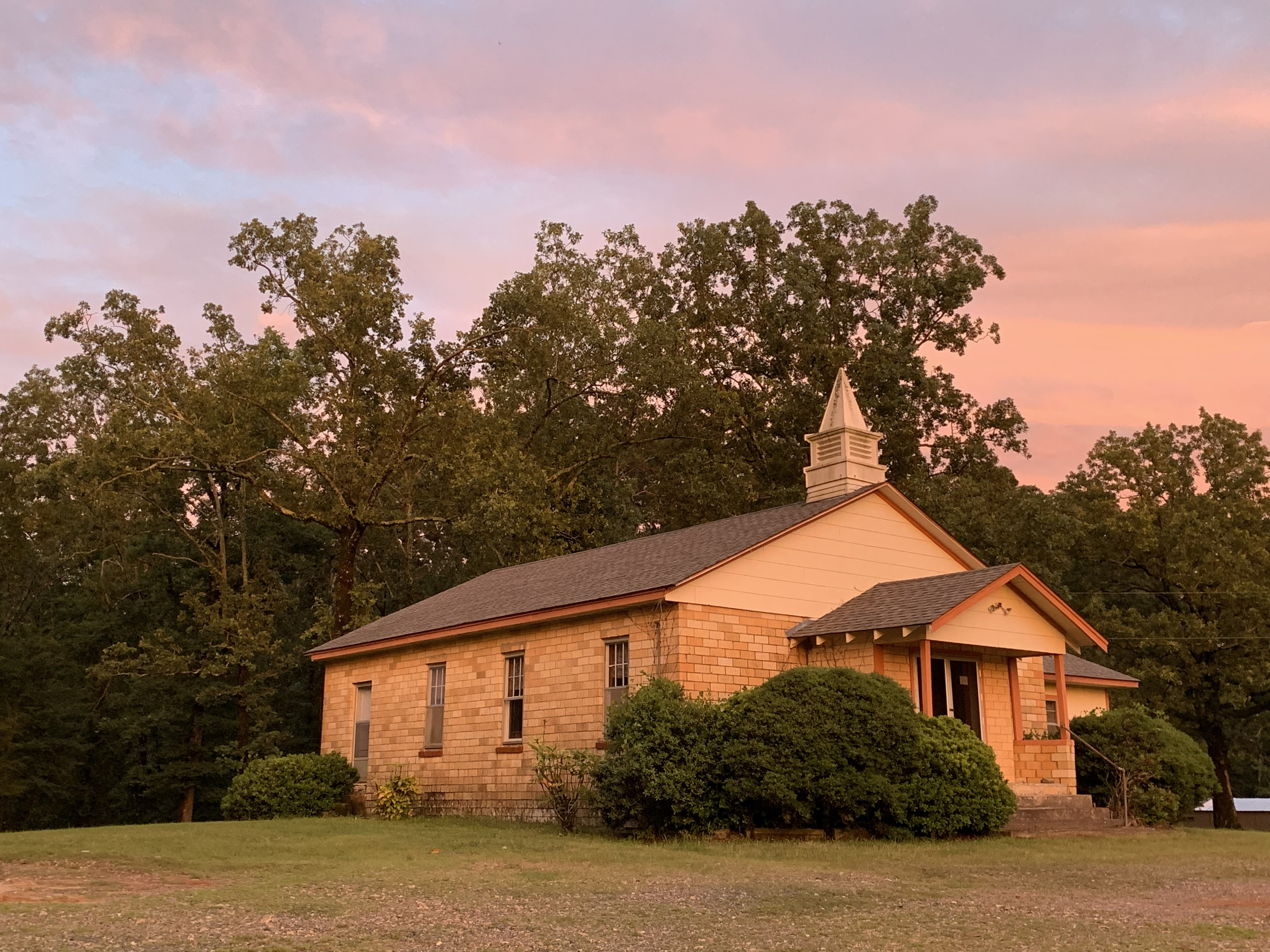
Grants Chapel, Bonnerdale, Arkansas

States with the highest median household incomes in rural areas were Connecticut ($93,382) and New Jersey ($92,972) (not statistically different from each other). The state with the lowest rural median household income was Mississippi ($40,200). Among rural areas, poverty rates varied from a low in Connecticut (4.6 percent) to a high in New Mexico (21.9 percent).

About 13.4 million children under the age of 18 live in rural areas of the nation. Children in rural areas had lower rates of poverty than those in urban areas (18.9 percent compared with 22.3 percent), but more of them were uninsured (7.3 percent compared with 6.3 percent). A higher percentage of "own children" in rural areas lived in married-couple households (76.3 percent compared with 67.4 percent). ("Own children" includes never-married biological, step and adopted children of the couple).

As of 2016, about 7 percent of homeless people in the United States live in rural areas, although some believe that this is an underestimate.

== Health ==
There are significant health disparities between urban and rural areas. The per capita rate of primary care physicians is lower in rural areas (65 primary care physicians per 100,000 rural Americans, compared to 105 primary care physicians for urban and suburban Americans). Rural Americans are more likely than other Americans to suffer from chronic health conditions such as diabetes, heart disease, and cancer.

A study published in the journal JAMA Pediatrics in 2015 analyzed data on U.S. youth suicide rates from 1996 to 2010. It found that the rates of suicides for rural Americans aged 10 to 24 was almost double the rate among their urban counterparts. This was attributed to social isolation, greater availability of guns, and difficulty accessing healthcare.

Notwithstanding the economic and health challenges, a 2018 survey of rural adults found a majority felt they were better off financially than their parents at the same age. They thought their children would also experience such improvement. Forty percent said their lives came out better than they expected.

== See also ==
- Agriculture in the United States
- American frontier
- Rural American history
- Rural Electrification Act
- Rural internet
- Rural letter carrier
- List of U.S. states by population density
- Rural health
- Urban–rural political divide#United States
