= American Country Life Association =

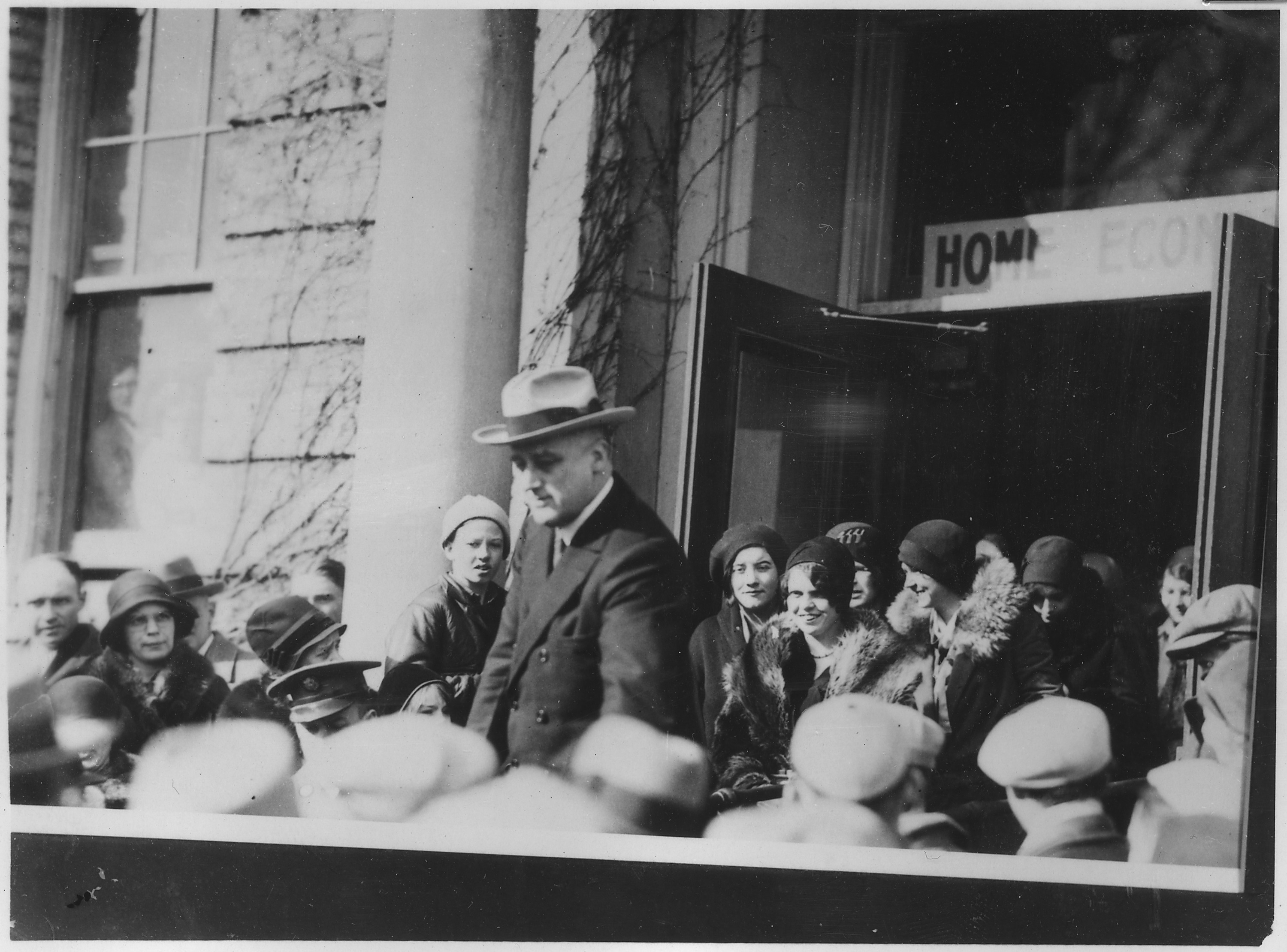
Governor Franklin D. Roosevelt at the 1931 ACLA conference (Cornell University, Ithaca, New York, August 19, 1931)

American Country Life Association (ACLA; originally, National Country Life Association; est. 1919) was a national agency of the United States devoted to rural progress. It was the only organization of its kind of national scope, emphasizing the human factor in agriculture. The ACLA maintained administrative offices and staff at 1849 Grand Central Terminal Building in New York City.

The purpose of the ACLA was to encourage discussion of problems in country life and in order to meet them, to secure cooperation of persons and institutions engaged in the service of country life. It included in the sphere of "country life" home making, means of education both for children and adults, health and sanitation, recreation, local government, country planning, morals, and religion. It believed that wealth and welfare interests were interwoven and that the success of agriculture depended upon the development of people on the land. It was formed by volunteer workers, who financed the work from voluntary contributions of from US$3 to US$100.

== History ==
President Theodore Roosevelt appointed the Commission on Country Life in 1908 to address concerns raised by the country life movement. One of the commission's objectives for the improvement of rural life was accomplished in 1919 through the creation of the ACLA.

The First National Country Life Conference was held at Baltimore in January 1918. It was attended by 175 persons from 30 states, who represented 25 national organizations and five federal bureaus engaged in country life work. The conference was such a distinct success that the National Country Life Association was formed and a committee on a permanent constitution was authorized to report at the next conference. By 1919, the association had nearly 500 members. The work already accomplished by the association, demonstrated its usefulness for bringing together the various national and state organizations and agencies engaged in the improvement of country life. World War I and the social situation ensuing gave a new vision of the importance and needs of country life. Many organizations and agencies were extending their work to rural communities. At such a time, the conference of all these forces to consider their common problems and responsibilities was valuable. The National Country Life Association had no administrative program of work. It aimed "to facilitate discussion of the problems and objectives of country life and the means of their solution and attainment; to further the efforts and increase the efficiency of agencies and institutions engaged in this field; to disseminate information calculated to promote a better understanding of country life, and to aid in rural improvement."

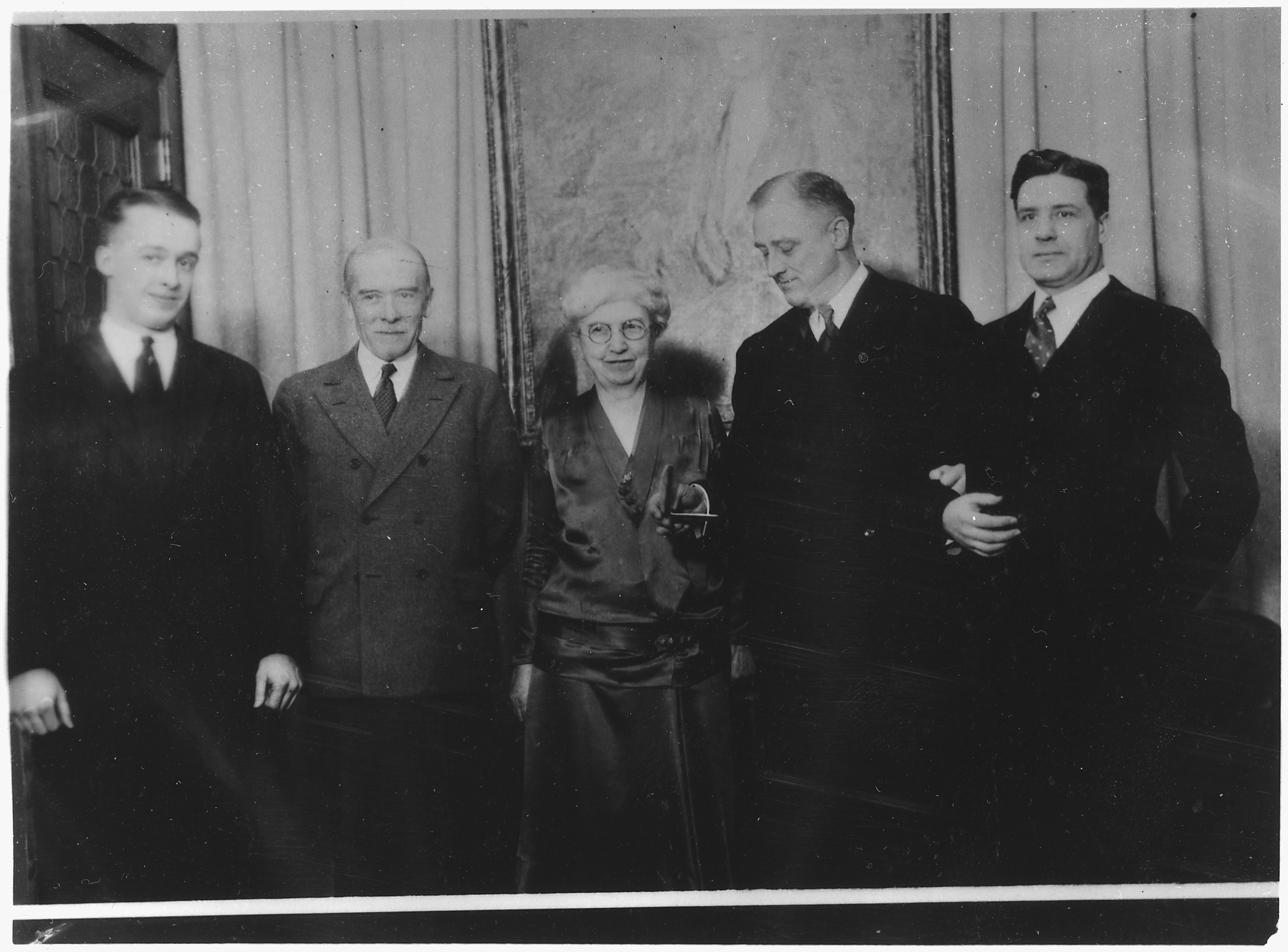
ACLA conference, 1931

It was reported in 1920 that the ACLA was represented on the programs of national conferences of several organizations, including, the National Conference of Social Work; National Association for Public-Health Nursing; the Lane Conference on Community Organization; the National Emergency Educational Conference; the National Information Bureau; and the National Conference of Social Work: Committee on Co-ordination of Social Agencies.

In 1923, after four years of preliminary work, it was prepared for much larger service. It had for the first time a full-time secretary. It was about to issue the first of a series of monthly bulletins to members. It sought to give wide publicity to the newer movements in the country life field. It was in constant consultation with members of the U.S. Department of Agriculture in Washington, D.C. The association, while American in origin and in its main line of work, had an international point of view and was in communication with similar movements all over the world.

By 1963, the ACLA's primary concern became the establishment of a Presidential commission that would study the entire area of country life.

== Preamble ==
The American Country Life Association is maintained to facilitate discussion of the problems and objectives in country life and the means of their solution and attainment; to further the efforts and increase the efficiency of persons, agencies, and institutions engaged in this field; and to disseminate information calculated to promote a better understanding of country life and to aid in rural improvement.

== Activities ==
Its field was broadly that of rural social improvement, embracing among others the following country life interests: the rural home, rural education, morals and religion, rural government, and rural recreation. It published several volumes, averaging 225 pages each, on the country life movement.

The functions of the association were to:

- Emphasize the importance of the country life problem;
- Help to formulate an all-round program of life on the land according to American ideals;
- Help to coordinate country life agencies;
- Cooperate with country life clubs, state-wide and local;
- Conduct an annual country life conference;
- Publish proceedings of its conferences and Rural America, a monthly periodical;
- Promote the training of rural leaders;
- Retain the cooperation and support of a substantial number of members and affiliated organizations;
- Maintain the National Council of Agencies Engaged in Rural Social Work;
- Serve as a national information bureau on country life affairs

== Administration ==
The association existed to assemble and integrate the active workers and forces in the country life field for the accomplishment of the purposes stated in the preamble. It invited executives and other representatives of national, state and local organizations working in any part of its field. Any person interested in its program could become a member on the payment of the membership fee. National, state, district and local associations or conferences could become affiliated with the association by vote of the association on the recommendation of its executive committee.

The organization had many standing committees, including: Rural Home, Rural Education, Morals and Religion, Rural Government, Communication, Rural Health and Sanitation, Rural Recreation, Rural Charities and Corrections, Country Planning, Teaching of Rural Sociology in Schools and Colleges, Investigation of Rural School Problems, Enlistment and Training of Country Life Leaders, Public Information, Country Life Organization, International Relations of the Country Life Movement, and Committee on Economic Relations of Country Life Affairs.

== Partnerships ==
The ACLA had no economic program and no educational program of its own. It merely arranged to spread out at a convening at least annual the country life programs of many organizations with a view of securing closer cooperation between them. These organizations included the following:

- States Relation Service,
- U.S. Dept. of Agriculture
- U.S. Public Health Service
- National Child Labor Committee
- Rural Education Department of the NEA
- Children's Bureau of the U.S. Dept. of Labor
- National Catholic Welfare Council
- American Farm Bureau Federation
- American Red Cross
- Community Service, Inc.
- Playground and Recreation Association of America
- Young Women's Christian Association
- Young Men's Christian Association,
- Child Health Organization of America
- National Girl Scouts
- Federal Council of Churches and Home Missions Council
- National Child Health Council
- National Organization for Public Health Nursing
- American Library Association
- Russell Sage Foundation
- American Home Economics Association
- National Grange
- U.S. Bureau of Education

== Notable people ==
- Roy C. Buck, president, ACLA
- Kenyon L. Butterfield, president, ACLA
- Frank O. Lowden, president, ACLA

== Selected works ==
- Objectives in Country Life
- Rural Health
- Rural Organization
- Town and Country Relations
- Educating the Country Community
- The Rural Home
- Religion in Country Life
- Needed Readjustments in Rural Life Today
- Farm Youth
- A Decade of Rural Progress
