= Kenyon L. Butterfield =

American agricultural scientist

Kenyon Leech Butterfield
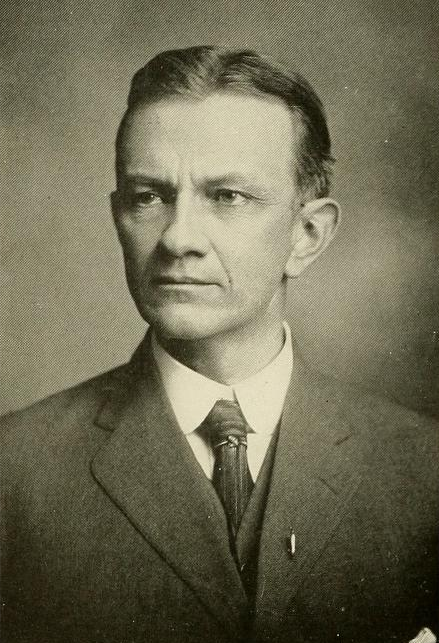
- Kenyon L. Butterfield c. 1922

President of the Rhode Island College of Agriculture and the Mechanic Arts (now the University of Rhode Island)
- In office 1903–1906

President of the Massachusetts Agricultural College (now the University of Massachusetts Amherst)
- In office 1906–1924

President of Michigan Agricultural College, (now Michigan State University)
- In office 1924–1928

Personal details
- Born: June 11, 1868 Lapeer, Michigan, U.S.
- Died: November 26, 1935 (aged 67) Amherst, Massachusetts, U.S.

Kenyon Leech Butterfield (June 11, 1868 – November 25, 1936) was an American agricultural scientist and college administrator known for developing the Cooperative Extension Service at the land-grant universities. He was president of the Rhode Island College of Agriculture and Mechanic Arts (1903–1906); the Massachusetts Agricultural College (1906–1924), and the Michigan Agricultural College (later Michigan State College of Agriculture and Applied Science, which is now Michigan State University) from 1924 to 1928. He also served as president of the American Country Life Association.

== Biography ==
Kenyon Leech Butterfield was born June 11, 1868, in Lapeer, Michigan, to Ira H. and Olive F. (Davison) Butterfield.

He married Harriet E. Millard of Lapeer on November 28, 1895.

He attended public schools in Lapeer and earned a bachelor's degree in 1891 and master's degree in 1902 at Michigan Agricultural College.

Butterfield began his academic career as an instructor of rural sociology at Michigan Agricultural College in 1902, and became president and professor of political economy and rural sociology at the Rhode Island College of Agriculture and Mechanic Arts, serving until June, 1906. On July 1, 1906, he assumed the presidency of Massachusetts Agricultural College in Amherst, Massachusetts. He eventually returned to his alma mater Michigan Agricultural College as president from 1924 to 1928.

Butterfield was an early proponent of extension education programming at the Land Grant Colleges rather than extension activities being a direct responsibility of the U.S Department of Agriculture, an idea championed by fellow Extension pioneer Seaman A. Knapp. Using state funds in April 1904, Butterfield created an Agricultural Extension Department at the Rhode Island College of Agriculture and Mechanic Arts, and in 1906 did the same at Massachusetts Agricultural College. The organizational structure of these two colleges formed the basis of the Smith-Lever Act of 1914, which authorized federal funding of comprehensive Cooperative Extension programming by Land Grant Colleges and Universities nationwide.

He died from a heart attack at his home in Amherst on November 26, 1935.

== Legacy ==
Butterfield Hall at the University of Rhode Island, Butterfield House at the University of Massachusetts Amherst and Butterfield Hall of the Brody Complex at Michigan State University are all dedicated in his name.

== Selected works ==
- "The Social Phase of Agricultural Education", Popular Science Monthly (1905)
- Inaugural Address, Massachusetts Agricultural College (1906)
- "Federation of Rural Social Forces", The Making of America Vol. V (1907)
- Dedication Address of the Petersham Agricultural High School (1908)
- "Chapters in Rural Progress" (1908)
- "Rural Life and the Family", Proceedings of the third annual meeting of the American Sociological Society (1908)
- "The Country and the Rural Problem" (1909)
- "The Call of the Country Parish" (1914)
- "A State System of Agricultural Education" (1916)
- "The Farmer and the New Day" (1919)
- "Education and Chinese Agriculture" (1922)
- "The Christian Mission in Rural India" (1930)
- "The Training of Missionaries for Rural Service" (1933)

Academic offices
Preceded by John Hosea Washburn	President of Rhode Island College of Agriculture and Mechanic Arts; 1903-1906	Succeeded by Howard Edwards
Preceded by William P. Brooks	President of Massachusetts Agricultural College; 1906–1924	Succeeded by Edward M. Lewis
Preceded by David Friday	President of Michigan Agricultural College; 1924–1925	Succeeded by Himself
Preceded by Himself	President of Michigan State College of Agriculture and Applied Science; 1925–1928	Succeeded by Robert S. Shaw
