= Rural Electrification Act =

1936 United States federal law

- Other short titles: Rural Electrification and Telephone Service Act of 1936
- Long title: An Act to provide for rural electrification, and for other purposes.
- Nicknames: Rural Electrification Act of 1936
- Enacted by: the 74th United States Congress
- Effective: May 20, 1936

Citations
- Public law: Pub. L. 74–605
- Statutes at Large: 49 Stat. 1363

Codification
- Titles amended: 7 U.S.C.: Agriculture
- U.S.C. sections created: 7 U.S.C. ch. 31 § 901 et seq.

Legislative history
- Introduced in the Senate as S. 3483 by George W. Norris (I–NE) on February 17, 1936; Committee consideration by Senate Agriculture and Forestry, House Interstate and Foreign Commerce; Passed the Senate on March 5, 1936 (Passed); Passed the House on April 9, 1936 (Passed); Reported by the joint conference committee on April 13, 1936; agreed to by the House on May 14, 1936 (Agreed) and by the Senate on May 15, 1936 (Agreed); Signed into law by President Franklin D. Roosevelt on May 20, 1936

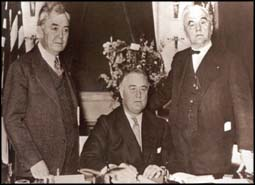
Franklin Delano Roosevelt (center) signs the Rural Electrification Act with Representative John Rankin (left) and Senator George William Norris (right)

The Rural Electrification Act of 1936 (REA), enacted on May 20, 1936, provided federal loans for the installation of electrical distribution systems to serve isolated rural areas of the United States.

The funding was channeled through cooperative electric power companies, hundreds of which still exist today. These member-owned cooperatives purchased power on a wholesale basis and distributed it using their own network of transmission and distribution lines. The Rural Electrification Act was one of many New Deal proposals by President Franklin D. Roosevelt to remedy high unemployment during the Great Depression.

== History ==
On May 11, 1935, President Roosevelt issued Executive Order 7037, which created the Rural Electrification Administration. In 1936, the Congress endorsed Roosevelt's action by passing the Rural Electrification Act. At the time the Rural Electrification Act was passed, electricity was commonplace in cities but largely unavailable in farms, ranches, and other rural places. Representative John E. Rankin and Senator George William Norris were supporters of the Rural Electrification Act, which was signed into law by Roosevelt on May 20, 1936.

Speaker of the House Sam Rayburn was a major proponent of the REA, which he helped pass in 1936 as Chairman of the House Interstate and Foreign Commerce Committee. Rayburn stated in 1959 that ninety percent of farm homes in the U.S. were electrified, compared to three percent in the early 1930s.

== Criticism and Technical issues ==
Historians Richard F. Hirsh and David T. Beito have criticized the REA for stifling the growth of more decentralized non-governmental sources of power. According to Beito, "the REA, and the TVA before it, reduced incentives for consumers to “stay off the grid.” At the time those agencies came on the scene, more than half of all electrified farm homes had individual generators. Manufactured by commercial companies and sold directly to consumers, these so-called “individual lighting plants” used such diverse power sources as wind, water, gasoline, or kerosene."

Supporters of the REA argued that the provision of power to remote areas was not economically feasible. A 2300-volt distribution system was then used in cities. This relatively low voltage could be carried only about 4 miles (6.4 km) before the voltage drop became unacceptable. REA cooperatives used a 6900-volt distribution network (soon changed to the present-day 12,470/7200V 4-wire Y system), which could support much longer runs (up to about 40 mi (64 km)). Despite requiring more expensive transformers at each home, the overall system cost was manageable.

In opposition to this view, Beito states that "Private companies had led a four-fold increase in electrification, some of which occurred during a so-called “agricultural depression” between 1924 (2.8% of rural homes) and 1932 (11.8% of rural homes). Had this original rate of increase continued (it slowed but did not decline during the early 1930s) nearly all farms would have been electrified by the 1940s."" However, an article by Tim Sablik notes that the rate of rural electrification had stalled at 11% between 1932 and 1938 — when the Rural Electrification Act went into effect — due to the economic infeasibility of extending electrification to rural regions and the inability for power utilities to leverage economies of scale over large, sparsely populated areas, and that the utility cooperatives created by the act helped bring the price of rural electrification down to a manageable level.

== Wiring homes and farms ==
REA crews traveled through the American countryside, bringing teams of electricians along with them. The electricians added wiring to houses and barns to utilize the newly available power provided by the line crews. A standard REA installation in a house (post-World War II) consisted of:

- A 60-amp, 230-volt fuse panel, with:
1. A 60-amp range circuit
2. A 20-amp kitchen circuit
3. Two or three 15-amp lighting circuits

A ceiling-mounted light fixture was installed in each room, usually controlled by a single switch mounted near a door. At most, one outlet was installed per room, since plug-connected appliances were expensive and uncommon. Wiring was performed using type NM (nonmetallic sheathed cable), insulated with asbestos-reinforced rubber covered with jute and tar.

Many of these original installations still exist today, though most have been augmented to support a greater number and variety of appliances.

== Later amendments ==
Some amendments to the Rural Electrification Act include:

- 1944: loan terms increased to 35 years; the act is made permanent
- 1949: extended the act to allow loans to telephone companies wishing to extend their connections to unconnected rural areas
- 1993: provisions to restructure the direct loan programs for rural electricity, telephone cooperatives, and energy conservation market
- December 8, 1993: North American Free Trade Agreement Implementation Act—The "Buy American" provision to now include Mexico and Canada.
- 2008: provisions for access to rural broadband telecommunications network and rural internet
- 2014: pilot program for rural gigabit broadband network

Date of enactment	Public law number	U.S. statute citation	U.S. legislative bill	U.S. Presidential administration
September 21, 1944	P.L. 78-425	58 Stat. 734	H.R. 4278	Franklin D. Roosevelt
October 28, 1949	P.L. 81-423	63 Stat. 948	H.R. 2960	Harry S. Truman
June 15, 1955	P.L. 84–70	69 Stat. 131	S. 153	Dwight D. Eisenhower
October 23, 1962	P.L. 87-862	76 Stat. 1140	H.R. 10708	John F. Kennedy
May 7, 1971	P.L. 92–12	85 Stat. 29	S. 70	Richard M. Nixon
June 30, 1972	P.L. 92-324	86 Stat. 390	H.R. 14423	Richard M. Nixon
May 11, 1973	P.L. 93–32	87 Stat. 65	S. 394	Richard M. Nixon
November 4, 1975	P.L. 94–124	89 Stat. 677	H.R. 4799	Gerald R. Ford
October 20, 1976	P.L. 94-570	90 Stat. 2701	H.R. 12207	Gerald R. Ford
May 25, 1984	P.L. 98-300	98 Stat. 215	H.R. 2211	Ronald W. Reagan
October 21, 1992	P.L. 102–428	106 Stat. 2183	H.R. 5237	George H.W. Bush
November 1, 1993	P.L. 103–129	107 Stat. 1356	H.R. 3123	William J. Clinton
December 17, 1993	P.L. 103–201	107 Stat. 2342	H.R. 3514	William J. Clinton
June 18, 2008	P.L. 110–246	122 Stat. 1651	H.R. 6124	George W. Bush
February 7, 2014	P.L. 113–79	128 Stat. 649	H.R. 2642	Barack H. Obama II

== See also ==
- Great Depression
- Rural Utilities Service
