= Deanna Rose Children's Farmstead =

Attraction in Overland Park, Kansas, US

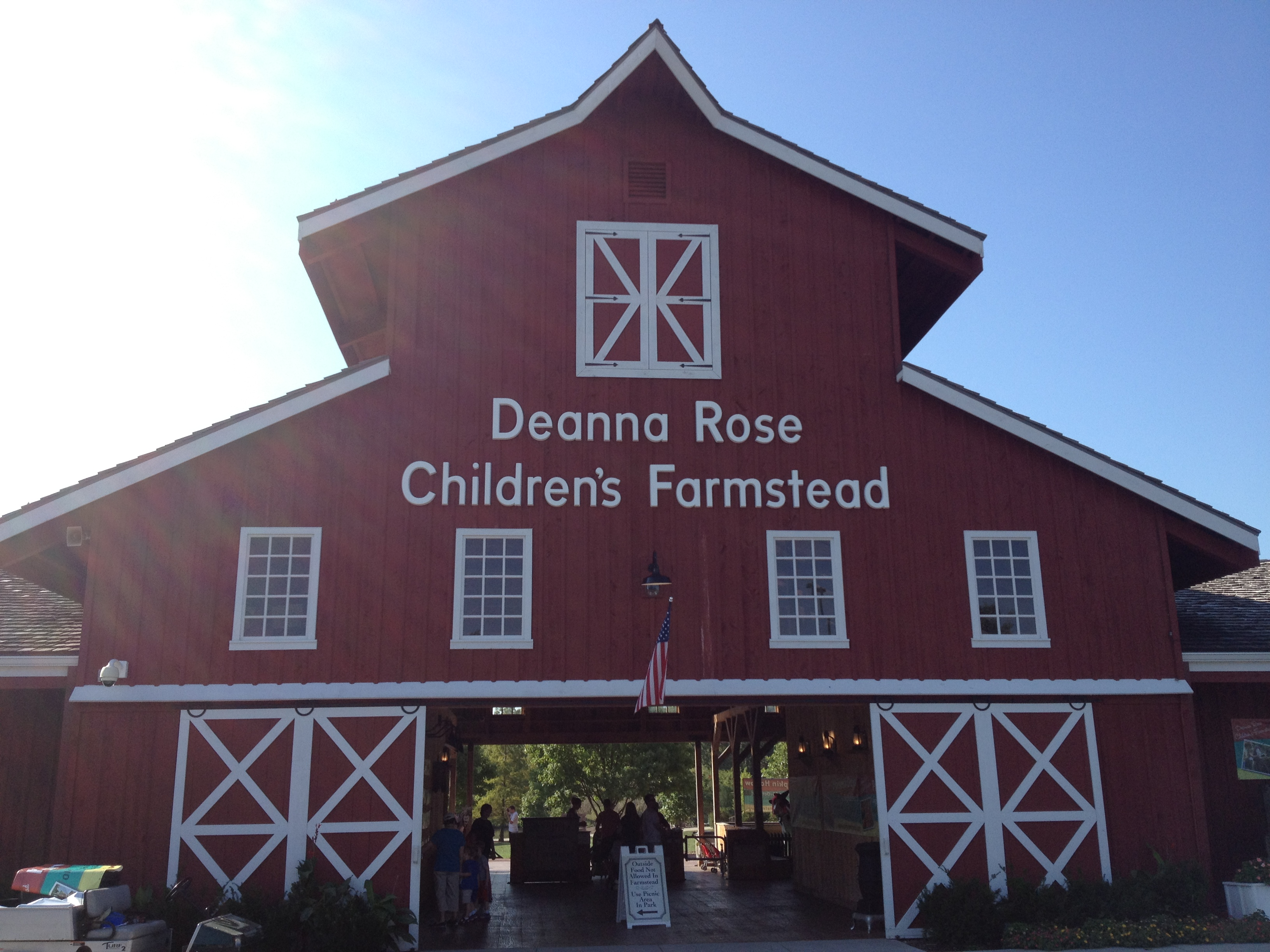
- Deanna Rose Children's Farmstead entrance
- Interactive map of Deanna Rose Children's Farmstead
- Location: Overland Park, Kansas
- Coordinates: 38.877°N 94.703°W
- Area: 12 acres (4.86 ha)
- Created: 1978
- Operator: City of Overland Park

The Deanna Rose Children's Farmstead is an educational family attraction that focuses on agriculture and local history in Overland Park, Kansas. The facility shows farm animals, birds of prey, show gardens, butterfly gardens, a nature trail, a Kanza Native American display, and a full-scale one-room schoolhouse. The facility also provides playgrounds, a fishing pond, and horse-drawn wagon rides.

== Attractions ==
Deanna Rose Children's Farmstead provides visitors with opportunities to engage in various activities, including animal feeding, with feed available for purchase at the General Store and through coin-operated machines. Notable activities include bottle feeding of baby goats, cow milking demonstrations in the dairy barn, fishing at a pond, and goat yoga on select dates.

The Farmstead features multiple playgrounds, such as Morgan's Playground, the Prairie Playground, and a pedal tractor track. The Play Barn, designed to resemble a 19th-century barn, includes slides and climbing structures. Visitors can also take wagon rides pulled by Belgian draft horses. Additional attractions include a mining shack for gem sifting and a nature trail.

Animal exhibits at the Farmstead include birds of prey, bison, bobcats, prairie dogs, rabbits, ducks, geese, cattle, goats, pigs, turkeys, chickens, and peafowl. Educational components include a general store, Ben's Bank, Helen's one-room schoolhouse, a Kanza Indian encampment, and John's blacksmith shop, which hosts blacksmithing demonstrations. The Cinemoo Moovie Theater, located in the dairy barn, presents information about the history of dairy in Kansas.

The facility also offers several outdoor picnic areas and gardens, including the 50th Anniversary Garden, a butterfly garden, and an apple orchard.

The farmstead hosts several annual events in the Fall. Pumpkin Hollow provides daytime, family-oriented activities like hayrides, a corn maze, and a pumpkin patch, available on select dates in October. Night of the Living Farm is an evening Halloween event held on specific Fridays and Saturdays in late October, featuring both scary and non-scary attractions and live entertainment.

== History ==
The Deanna Rose Children's Farmstead traces back to 1971, when Overland Park purchased the land for what was originally planned as a community park. The farmstead officially opened over Memorial Day weekend in 1978. It featured a petting zoo with a small group of animals (including miniature horses, Shetland ponies, goats, sheep, calves, and chickens) alongside a vegetable garden and a silo slide. In its inaugural year, the facility attracted approximately 11,000 visitors.

On May 27, 1985, the Farmstead was renamed to honor Deanna Rose, an officer with the Overland Park Police Department, who was the department's first officer to die in the line of duty in January of that year.

In 1996, the farmstead established Friends of the Farmstead as a non-profit organization to help raise funds for future projects and programs. A significant expansion project began in 2000, resulting in the addition of several new attractions, including the fishing shack and Grandpa Bob’s fishing pond. Over the following years, other features were introduced, such as the one-room schoolhouse, Kanza Indian encampment, Prairie Playground, tractor track, dairy barn, and Main Street.

In 2009, a new, larger entrance building was opened to expand visitor access. The Ben Craig administration building was completed in 2018 to provide additional space for staff, a new concession area, and family restrooms.

In 2010, the farmstead began charging admission fees for certain dates and times.

In 2014, the site began hosting an elaborate Christmas light display around the Christmas Holiday Season.

In 2021, Mackenzie’s Island was opened, featuring a water wheel and gazebo overlooking the fishing pond, and a new mining shack was introduced in 2023.
