= Rutherford High School =

Rutherford High School may refer to:

- Rutherford High School (New Jersey), Rutherford, New Jersey, United States
- Rutherford High School (Florida), Springfield, Florida, United States
- Rutherford Technology High School, Maitland, New South Wales, Australia
- The former name of Rutherford College, Auckland, New Zealand

== See also ==
- Rutherford School (disambiguation)
