= Rutherford School (disambiguation) =

Rutherford School is an independent special school for pupils with profound and multiple learning difficulties in Croydon, London, England.

Rutherford School may also refer to:

- Rutherford School, Paddington, London, England, a secondary modern/comprehensive school which existed from 1960 to 1981
- Mark Rutherford School, a secondary school in Bedford, England
- Rutherford High School (disambiguation)
- Rutherford School District, Bergen County, New Jersey, United States
