= Country life movement =

20th-century American social movement

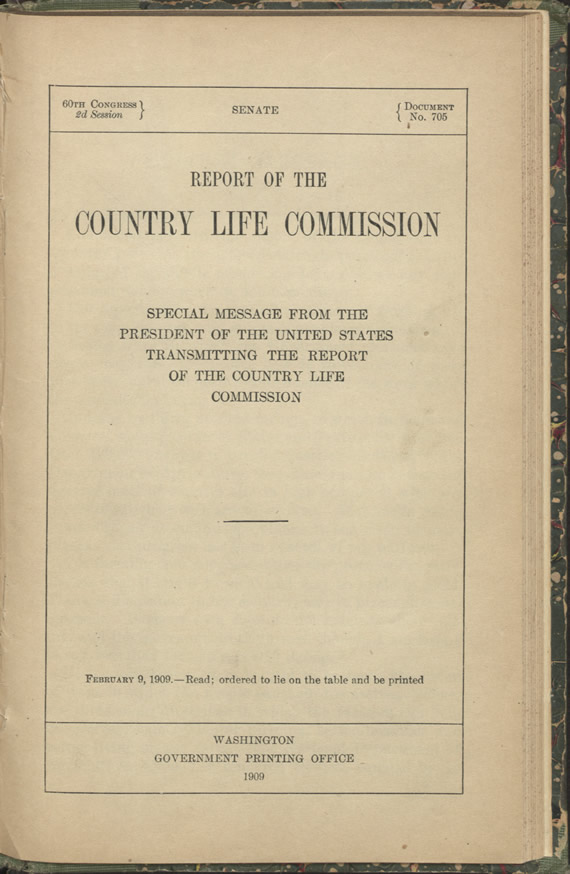
Country Life Commission Report

The country life movement was an early 20th century American social movement which sought to improve the living conditions of America's rural residents. It was sponsored by President Theodore Roosevelt and led by Professor Liberty Hyde Bailey. The movement focused on preserving traditional rural lifestyles while addressing poor living conditions and social problems within rural communities. Despite the movement's rural focus, many of its adherents were urbanites who sought to bring progressive changes and technological improvements to rural areas. The main goal was to improve education, with the professionally-run consolidated school replacing the many family-run one-room schools. The movement had little success in changing rural ways of life; its principal successes were the promotion of agricultural extension programs and the development of national organizations to improve rural living.

== Philosophy ==
The country life movement's adherents largely fell into three schools of thought. The first group was mainly composed of urban agrarians who wished to improve rural living conditions in order to prevent farmers from flocking to cities and abandoning rural lifestyles. This philosophy held that rural lifestyles espoused certain moral values which were a positive influence on urbanites. Historian William Bowers has described this philosophy as contradictory, as these reformers sought to preserve a rural past while adding elements of urban life to rural lifestyles.

A second segment of country-lifers sought to improve what they saw as declining rural living conditions by introducing progressive ideals to rural life. This group attempted to institute successful urban social reforms in rural areas. These reforms were partially designed to improve the efficiency of American agriculture; the reformers feared that a degenerate rural population would not provide sufficient food for urbanites. The main two goals of this segment of reformers involved reforming rural schools and rural churches, which they saw as lagging behind their urban counterparts.

The third group affiliated with the movement consisted of farmers who sought to bring technological progress to their profession. This group promoted agricultural extension and attempted to bring industrial reforms to American farms. In addition, they promoted the idea that farmers should adopt business practices in their profession.

== Goals ==
President Theodore Roosevelt appointed the Commission on Country Life in 1908 to address concerns raised by the country life movement. Cornell University professor Liberty Hyde Bailey was appointed chairman of the commission. Other members of the commission included agricultural scientist and sociologist Kenyon L. Butterfield, forester Gifford Pinchot, and "Uncle" Henry Wallace (1836-1916), co-founder and editor of the nationally influential magazine Wallaces' Farmer. ("Uncle" Henry Wallace is often confused with his eldest son, Henry Cantwell Wallace (1866-1924), who was U.S. Secretary of Agriculture from 1921 to 1924.) The commission proposed three objectives for the improvement of rural life: a national agricultural extension program, scientific surveys of rural life, and the establishment of a national agency devoted to rural progress. The Smith-Lever Act of 1914 accomplished the first objective by allowing rural counties to establish advisors through land-grant universities who would help spread technology to rural living. The third goal was accomplished in 1919 through the creation of the American Country Life Association.

== Projects ==
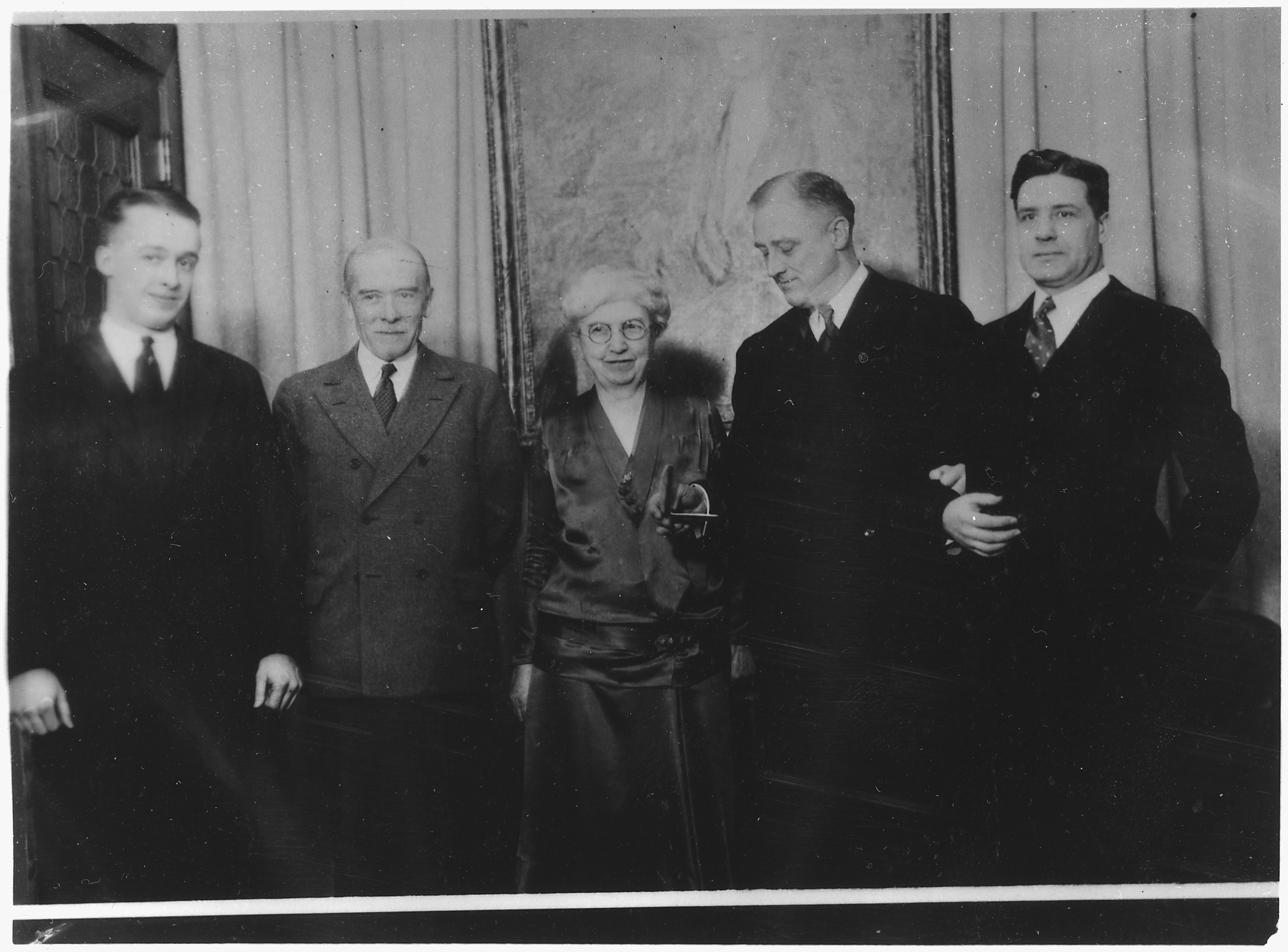
New York Governor Franklin D. Roosevelt (second from right) attends the 1931 American Country Life Association Conference at Cornell University

The 1920 Census was the first to report that half the population lived in rural areas. They experienced their own progressive reforms, typically with the explicit goal of upgrading country life. Special efforts were made to reach the rural South and remote areas, such as the mountains of Appalachia and the Ozarks.

The most urgent need was better transportation to get out of the mud. The railroad system was virtually complete; the need was for much better roads. The traditional method of placing the burden for maintaining roads on local landowners was increasingly inadequate. New York State took the lead in 1898, and by 1916 the old system had been discarded everywhere. Demands grew for local and state government to take charge.

With the coming of the automobile after 1910, urgent efforts were made to upgrade and modernize dirt roads designed for horse-drawn wagon traffic. The American Association for Highway Improvement was organized in 1910. Funding came from automobile registration, and taxes on motor fuels, as well as state aid. In 1916, federal-aid was first made available to improve post-roads, and promote general commerce. Congress appropriated $75 million over a five-year period, with the Secretary of Agriculture in charge through the Bureau of Public Roads, in cooperation with the state highway departments. There were 2.4 million miles of rural dirt roads in 1914; 100,000 miles had been improved with grading and gravel, and 3000 miles were given high quality surfacing.

The rapidly increasing speed of automobiles, and especially trucks, made maintenance and repair a high-priority item. Concrete was first used in 1909, and expanded until it became the dominant surfacing material in the 1930s.

Rural schools were often poorly funded, one room operations taught by young local women before they married, with occasional supervision by county superintendents. The progressive solution was modernization through consolidation, so the children could be attend modern Schools taught by full-time professional teachers who had graduated from the college programs and were certified and monitored by the county superintendent. Farmers complained at the expense, and also at the loss of control over local affairs, but in state after state the consolidation process went forward.

Numerous other programs were aimed at rural youth, including 4-H clubs, Boy Scouts and Girl Scouts. County fairs not only gave prizes for the most productive agricultural practices, they also demonstrated those practices to an attentive rural audience. Programs for new mothers included maternity care and training in baby care.

== Resistance ==
The movement's attempts at introducing urban reforms to rural America often met resistance from traditionalists who saw the country-lifers as aggressive modernizers who were condescending and out of touch with rural life. The traditionalists said many of their reforms were unnecessary and not worth the trouble of implementing. Rural residents also disagreed with the notion that farms needed to improve their efficiency, as they saw this goal as serving urban interests more than rural ones. The social conservatism of many rural residents also led them to resist attempts for change led by outsiders. Most important, the traditionalists did not want to become modern, and did not want their children inculcated with alien modern values through comprehensive schools that were remote from local control. The most successful reforms came from the farmers who pursued agricultural extension, as their proposed changes were consistent with existing trends in agriculture at the time.

== See also ==
- American Country Life Association
- Back-to-the-land movement
- Commission on Country Life of 1908
- Rural development
- Smith–Hughes Act of 1917
- Vander Wilt Farmstead Historic District
