= Maxwell (given name) =

Masculine given name

- Gender: Male
- Language: English and Scottish Gaelic

Origin
- Meaning: "From Mack's Spring"
- Region of origin: River Tweed, England and Scotland

Other names
- Nickname: Max

Maxwell is a masculine given name. It is of English and Scottish origin, meaning "From Mack's Spring". The name originates as a place name from a location on the River Tweed in Scotland and first recorded in 1144 CE, spelled Mackeswell.

== People with this given name ==
=== A ===
- Maxwell Acosty, Ghanaian footballer
- Maxwell Aitken (disambiguation)
- Maxwell Akora, Ugandan politician
- Maxwell Amponsah, Ghanaian boxer
- Maxwell Anderson, American playwright and writer
- Maxwell L. Anderson, American art historian and museum director
- Maxwell Anikwenwa, Nigerian Anglican bishop
- Maxwell Ariston Burgess, Bermudian politician
- Maxwell Armfield, English painter
- Maxwell Arnow, American film producer
- Maxwell Arthur, Ghanaian footballer
- Maxwell Atoms, American animator, screenwriter, storyboard artist, and voice actor
- Maxwell Ayrton, British architect

=== B ===
- Maxwell Baakoh, Ivorian footballer
- Maxwell Bates, Canadian architect and artist
- Maxwell Becton, American industrialist and businessman
- Maxwell Blacker, English cricketer and clergyman
- Maxwell Bodenheim, American poet and novelist
- Maxwell Bolus, South African cricketer
- Maxwell Brander, British Army general
- Maxwell Struthers Burt, American novelist, poet, and writer
- Maxwell Bury, British architect
- Maxwell Button, Canadian civil servant and politician

=== C ===
- Maxwell Carpendale, Irish Rugby Union player
- Maxwell Caulfield, British actor
- Maxwell Charles, American actor
- Maxwell Close, Irish politician
- Maxwell Combes, Australian cricketeer
- Maxwell Confait, Seychellois-English murder victim
- Maxwell Frederic Coplan, American photographer
- Maxwell Perry Cotton, American actor
- Maxwell Craig, minister of the Church of Scotland
- Maxwell Cummings, Canadian real estate builder and philanthropist

=== D ===
- Maxwell Dal Santo, Australian weightlifter
- Maxwell Dane, American executive and co-founder of Doyle Dane Bernbach
- Maxwell Davis, American saxophonist, bandleader, and record producer
- Maxwell Street Jimmy Davis, American singer-songwriter and guitarist
- Maxwell Deacon, Canadian ice hockey player
- Maxwell Dent, American online streamer, record producer, and rapper
- Maxwell DeMay, author
- Maxwell Dlamini, Swazi activist
- Maxwell Dube, Zimbabwean footballer
- Maxwell Dunn, Australian writer and radio producer

=== E ===
- Maxwell Chimezie Egwuatu, Nigerian footballer
- Maxwell Eley, British rower
- Maxwell Evarts, American lawyer and politician
- Maxwell Exsted, American tennis player

=== F ===
- Maxwell Fernie, New Zealand musician
- Maxwell Findlay, Scottish WWI flying ace
- Maxwell Finland, American scientist and medical researcher
- Maxwell Jacob Friedman, American wrestler
- Maxwell Frost, American activist and politician
- Maxwell Fry, English architect, writer and painter
- Maxwell J. Fry, expert in development finance

=== G ===
- Maxwell Gamble, Australian rower
- Maxwell Garnett, English educationist, barrister, peace campaigner and physicist
- Maxwell Garthshore, Scottish physician
- Maxwell Garvie, Scottish murder victim
- Maxwell M. Geffen, American publisher
- Maxwell Geismar, American writer
- Maxwell Henry Gluck, American diplomat and businessman
- Maxwell K. Goldstein, American scientist
- Maxwell Gray, English novelist and poet
- Maxwell Griffin, American soccer player
- Maxwell Gregory, Archdeacon of Singapore
- Maxwell Gruver, American who died from hazing
- Maxwell Gyamfi, German footballer

=== H ===
- Maxwell Hairston (born 2003), American football player
- Maxwell Hall, British colonial administrator, judge and author
- Maxwell S. Harris, American lawyer and politician
- Maxwell Hendler, American painter
- Maxwell Holt, American volleyball player
- Maxwell Hunter, American aerospace engineer
- Maxwell Hutchinson, English architect, broadcaster, and Anglican deacon

=== I ===
- Maxwell Irvine, British theoretical physicist and university administrator
- Maxwell Itoya, Nigerian immigrant killed

=== J ===
- Maxwell Ralph Jacobs, Australian forester
- Maxwell Jenkins, American actor
- Maxwell Joseph, British founder of Grand Metropolitan plc
- Maxwell Kofi Jumah, Ghanaian politician

=== K ===
- Maxwell Karger, American producer
- Maxwell Khobr, Nigerian general
- Maxwell Knight, British spymaster, naturalist and broadcaster
- Maxwell Konadu, Ghanaian association football player and manager

=== L ===
- Maxwell G. Lee, English educator and activist
- Maxwell Gordon Lightfoot, English painter
- Maxwell McCabe-Lokos, Canadian actor and musician
- Maxwell Kwame Lukutor, Ghanaian politician

=== M ===
- Maxwell, American singer
- Maxwell, Brazilian footballer
- Maxwell (born 1989), Brazilian footballer
- Maxwell Hendry Maxwell-Anderson, British naval officer, barrister and judge
- Maxwell Maltz, American cosmetic surgeon
- Maxwell Mavhunga, Zimbabwean politician
- Maxwell Mays, American painter
- Maxwell McCombs, American journalism scholar
- Maxwell Meighen, Canadian financier
- Maxwell Mensah, Ghanaian footballer
- Maxwell Miller, Australian politician
- Maxwell Mittelman, American voice actor
- Maxwell Mlilo, South African actor
- Maxwell Moss, South African politician
- Maxwell Murray, United States Army general
- Maxwell Mutanda, Zimbabwean artist and designer

=== N ===
- Maxwell Nagai, Ghanaian air force officer
- Maxwell Newton, Australian media publisher
- Maxwell Valentine Noronha, Indian Roman Catholic bishop
- Maxwell Nyamupanedengu, Zimbabwean footballer

=== O ===
- Maxwell Opoku-Afari, Ghanaian economist

=== P ===
- Maxwell Perkins, American book editor
- Maxwell Powers, American voice actor

=== Q ===
- Maxwell Abbey Quaye, Ghanaian footballer

=== R ===
- Maxwell Rayson, Australian cricketeer
- Maxwell Reed, Northern Irish actor
- Maxwell Rich, United States Army general
- Maxwell Richmond, New Zealand officer in the Royal Navy
- Maxwell Rosenlicht, American mathematician
- Maxwell C. Reece, micro-preemie born January 2015, at the University of Tennessee Medical Center in Knoxville, TN. At birth Maxwell weighed 1lb 5oz and was 21” long. Despite the low odds of 12% survival and 6-8% of walking and talking, Maxwell has defied the odds and has grown to be a very active, normal acting young man.

=== S ===
- Maxwell E. Seidman, American politician
- Maxwell Setton, British film producer
- Maxwell Shane, American film director
- Maxwell Shaw, British actor
- Maxwell Zeb Shumba, founding president of the Zimbabwe First Party
- Maxwell Sibiya, South African politician
- Maxwell Silva, Sri Lankan bishop
- Maxwell Simpson, Irish chemist
- Maxwell Stevens, American painter
- Maxwell Sudholz, Australian para-cyclist

=== T ===
- Maxwell D. Taylor, United States Army general
- Maxwell R. Thurman, United States Army general
- Maxwell Thurmond, American football coach

=== U ===
- Maxwell Upson, American educationalist

=== W ===
- Maxwell Walters, Australian cricketeer and business executive
- Maxwell Ward, Australian cricketeer
- Maxwell Ward, housemate on Big Brother (British TV series) series 6
- Maxwell Ward, 6th Viscount Bangor, Irish peer and politician
- Maxwell Wintrobe, Austrian-American physician

== Fictional characters ==
- Maxwell Edison, in the Beatles song Maxwell's Silver Hammer
- Maxwell Smart, title character of the Get Smart comedy spy media franchise
- Maxwell Sheffield, character in American sitcom The Nanny
- Maxwell Lord, supervillain appearing in American comic books published by DC Comics
- Maxwell Greevey, character from American television police procedural and legal drama Law & Order
- Maxwell Dillon, one of two collective supervillains in American comic books published by Marvel Comics
- Maxwell Nerdstrom, character in the American television sitcom Saved by the Bell
- Maxwell Klinger, character from the American media franchise M*A*S*H

== See also ==
- Max (given name)
- Maxwell (surname)
