= Dan Doyle (basketball) =

American basketball coach

Daniel E. Doyle, Jr. is the founder and Executive Director of the now-defunct Institute for International Sport. In 2016, Doyle was convicted of embezzling funds from the institute, and he is currently serving a seven-year prison sentence.

== Education ==
A 1972 graduate of Bates College, Doyle also served as a trustee at Bates. Doyle received his master's degree in international relations from The Fletcher School of Law and Diplomacy at Tufts University. He holds honorary doctorates from Bridgewater State College and the University of Rhode Island.

== Coaching history ==
Doyle was an assistant men's basketball coach at Brown University, and head men's basketball coach at both Kingswood-Oxford School in Connecticut, and at Trinity College (Connecticut). He compiled an overall coaching record of 142–45, and in his last year at Trinity, where his team ended the season ranked 13th in the country, he was named New England College Coach of the Year. Doyle's skills development basketball clinic is now in its 20th year of operation. Doyle has received numerous awards, including the Terrance Cardinal Cooke Humanitarian Award and induction into the Rhode Island Heritage Hall of Fame.

== Writing career ==
Doyle is the author of the novels, "An African Rebound" and Are You Watching, Adolph Rupp?. With Deborah Doermann Burch, he also co-authored a non-fiction book,The Encyclopedia of Sports Parenting.

== Public speaking roles ==
Doyle has been the principal speaker at over 450 functions, including major addresses at a White House conference on ethics, the Friendly Sons of St. Patrick's dinner in Scranton, Pennsylvania (where past speakers have included two U.S. Presidents, two Irish Prime Ministers and many U.S. Senators), and the keynote speaker at over 125 American colleges and universities, delivered on behalf of the NCAA Foundation.

== Institute for International Sport Investigation ==
A March 4, 2012 article, "Shadowed by Debt" by Katherine Gregg of the Providence Journal provided a detailed look at the unconventional relationship Dan Doyle had formed with the University of Rhode Island with the blessing of many top officials. The article cited numerous internal memos and documents obtained by the Journal showing a history back to the mid 1980s when the Institute first appeared at the University.

The Providence Journal reported Doyle had been acquiring properties on Bald Head Island, NC. Reporter Tom Mooney travelled to the island where Doyle's nonprofit Institute for International Sport had acquired two vacation homes and four house lots for $2.95 million. Doyle also bought a house lot on his own and four more through a partnership with his Bates College classmate, Deborah Burch, who records show, lives about three hours away in Durham, NC. The purchases totaled $1.39 million.

On March 14, 2012 the Providence Journal reported ex-staffers of the Institute for International Sport said Dan Doyle had used Institute funds to pay for his daughters college tuition at Oberlin College another other personal expenses including credit card bills.

On April 21, 2012 University of Rhode Island President David M. Dooley told the Providence Journal the University will hire a consultant to conduct a “comprehensive review” of relationships the university has with outside organizations and a lawyer to help URI deal with the probe of the Institute for International Sport. Dooley said he still wants the “independent examination of the university’s relationship and transactions with the Institute for International Sport,” which he announced in February and then put on hold at the urging of the state police. But that, he said, will come later. “As I have stated previously, we will not compromise the ongoing investigation by the state police. Our own important review will proceed once the work of law enforcement is complete,” he said Friday. “It has been my experience over the past three years that occurrences such as those associated with the Institute for International Sport are the exception at URI,” Dooley said in his statement. On June 1, 2012 the Associated Press reported URI had hired Providence attorney John "Terry" MacFadyen to assist URI's own lawyer with any legal issues pertaining to the Institute for International Sport. URI said through a spokeswoman MacFadyen would be paid $200/hr.

February 12, 2013 a year after the scandal first broke, the Providence Journal reported the University of Rhode Island hasn't begun their promised probes of the Institute for International Sport. A year after the state police began investigating Daniel Doyle and his Institute for International Sport, the University of Rhode Island has not yet launched either of the in-depth probes its president promised in the early days of the scandal. One was canceled; the other has yet to get off the ground. URI President David M. Dooley promised in February 2012 to bring in an outsider to conduct an “independent, impartial examination” of the school's relationship with the Institute. But days later, Dooley reversed course, saying it would hold off on its inquiry until “the work of law enforcement is complete.”

WPRI 12 reported on February 26, 2014 the Sports Institute lost its Tax Exempt status last year according to IRS however a website for the Institute indicates the organization is still accepting donations. WPRI also reported URI has leased the land the Institute buildings sit on to the Institute until 2017 for $1. The Institute owns the buildings. "We wanted to ask Doyle about whether the Institute was still receiving donations. The vehicle he was seen driving was parked in a handicapped spot in front of the Institute’s office in Kingston, indicating he was in the building. No one answered the door, but Doyle did acknowledge us from the second floor. He then closed the window with a chuckle."

== Arrest ==
Dan Doyle was arrested and indicted on May 3, 2013, in Rhode Island by the Rhode Island State Police, and accused by the Rhode Island Attorney General's office of embezzling more than $1 million from his foundation, the Institute for International Sport. An article in the Hartford Courant by Matthew Kauffman reports on claims by the prosecutors that Doyle is responsible for massive embezzlement at the Institute for International Sport and claiming ties to various figures including the Irish government which do not actually exist. Doyle is fighting the charges at this time.

Doyle was indicted on 18 counts.

February 22, 2014 Providence Journal reports more than 90 potential witnesses may be called at the trial including many prominent political figures, businessmen and university officials. The list includes former URI president Robert Carothers, current state Director of Administration Richard Licht, former House speaker William Murphy, former attorney general Patrick Lynch, former congressman and URI administrator Robert Weygand and philanthropist Alan Hassenfeld, the former CEO of toy maker Hasbro who was once the Institute's biggest supporter.

The list also includes former state senator John Revens, former Senate president now Judge Joseph Montabano, former Democratic Party chairman William J. Lynch, who did legal work for the Institute, dozens of URI finance and administration officials, and a host of former Institute employees.

The article says former University of Rhode Island President Robert Carothers seemed surprised the case was going to trial. "I would have thought there would be a plea deal.”

Doyle was found guilty on all 18 charges of fraud and embezzlement on Monday, December 5, 2016
