= Maxwell J. Fry =

Maxwell J. Fry (1944–2000) was a noted expert in development finance. Much of his writing is in favour of financial liberalisation and against financial repression. He gained a PhD in Economics at the LSE in 1970, and went on to lecture at the City University of London for four years. before leaving for post in the US first (1974) at the University of Hawaii and then (1980) at University of California-Irvine. He returned to the UK as an endowed (Tokai Bank) professorship in International Finance at the University of Birmingham. He served the Bank of England as a director their Center for Control Banking Studies

== Selected publications ==
- Fry, M. J. (1980). Saving, investment, growth and the cost of financial repression. World development, 8(4), 317-327.
- Fry, M. J. (1982). Models of financially repressed developing economies. World development, 10(9), 731-750.
- Fry, M. J. (1988/1995). Money, interest, and banking in economic development. Johns Hopkins University Press.
- Fry, M. J. (1997). In favour of financial liberalisation. The economic journal, 107(442), 754-770.
- Fry, M. J. (1993). Foreign direct investment in a macroeconomic framework: finance, efficiency, incentives and distortions (Vol. 1141). World Bank Publications.
