= Brown–Rhode Island football rivalry =

American college football rivalry

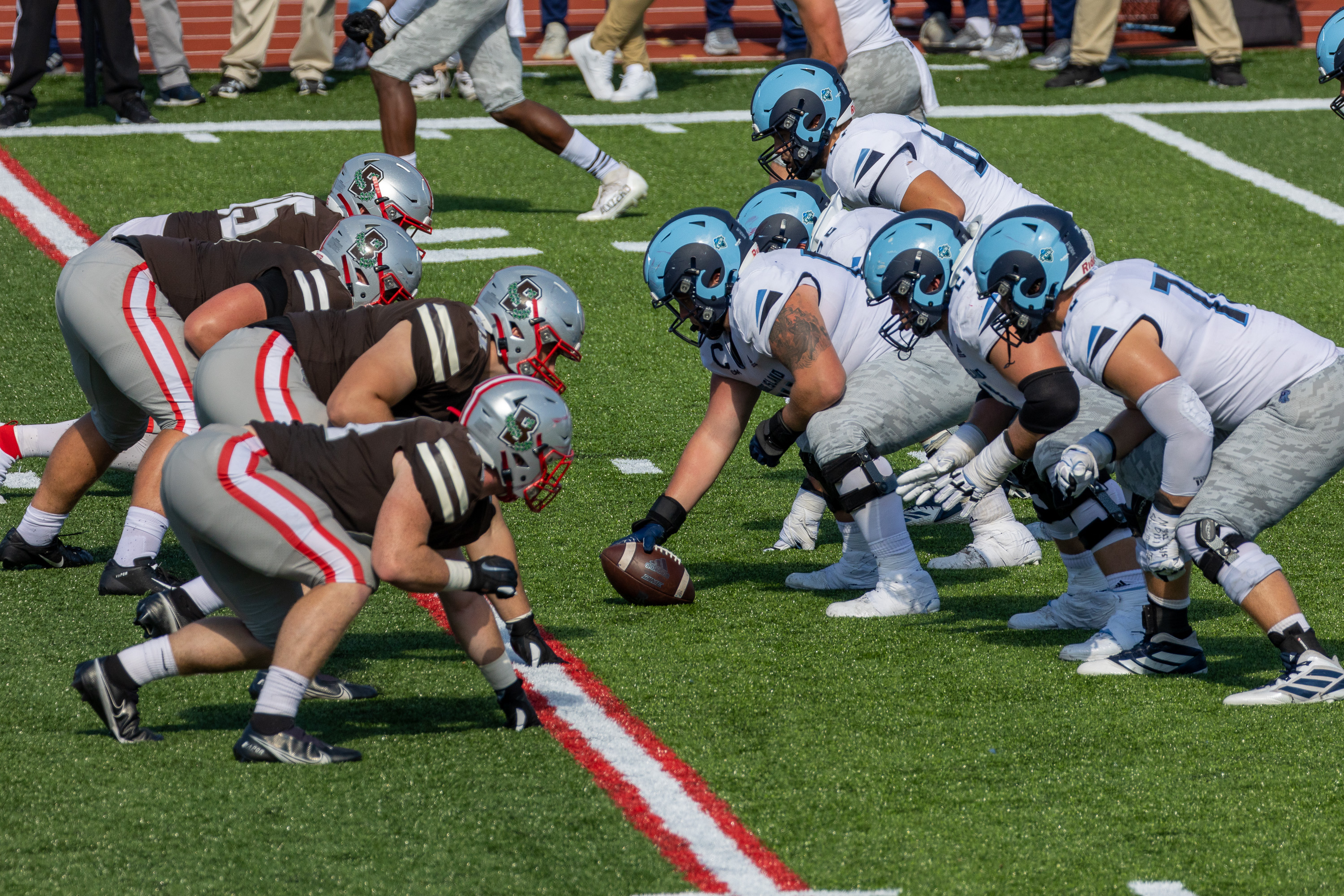

- Brown Bears Rhode Island Rams
- First meeting: September 29, 1909; Brown, 6–0
- Latest meeting: October 3, 2026; Rhode Island, 13–10
- Next meeting: October 9, 2027
- Trophy: Governor's Cup

Statistics
- Total meetings: 110
- All-time series: Brown leads, 74–34–2
- Trophy series: Rhode Island leads, 24–20
- Largest victory: Brown, 55–6 (1947)
- Longest win streak: Brown, 23 (1909–1934)
- Current win streak: Rhode Island, 1 (2026–present)

Locations of Brown and Rhode Island
2021 Governor's Cup, September 18

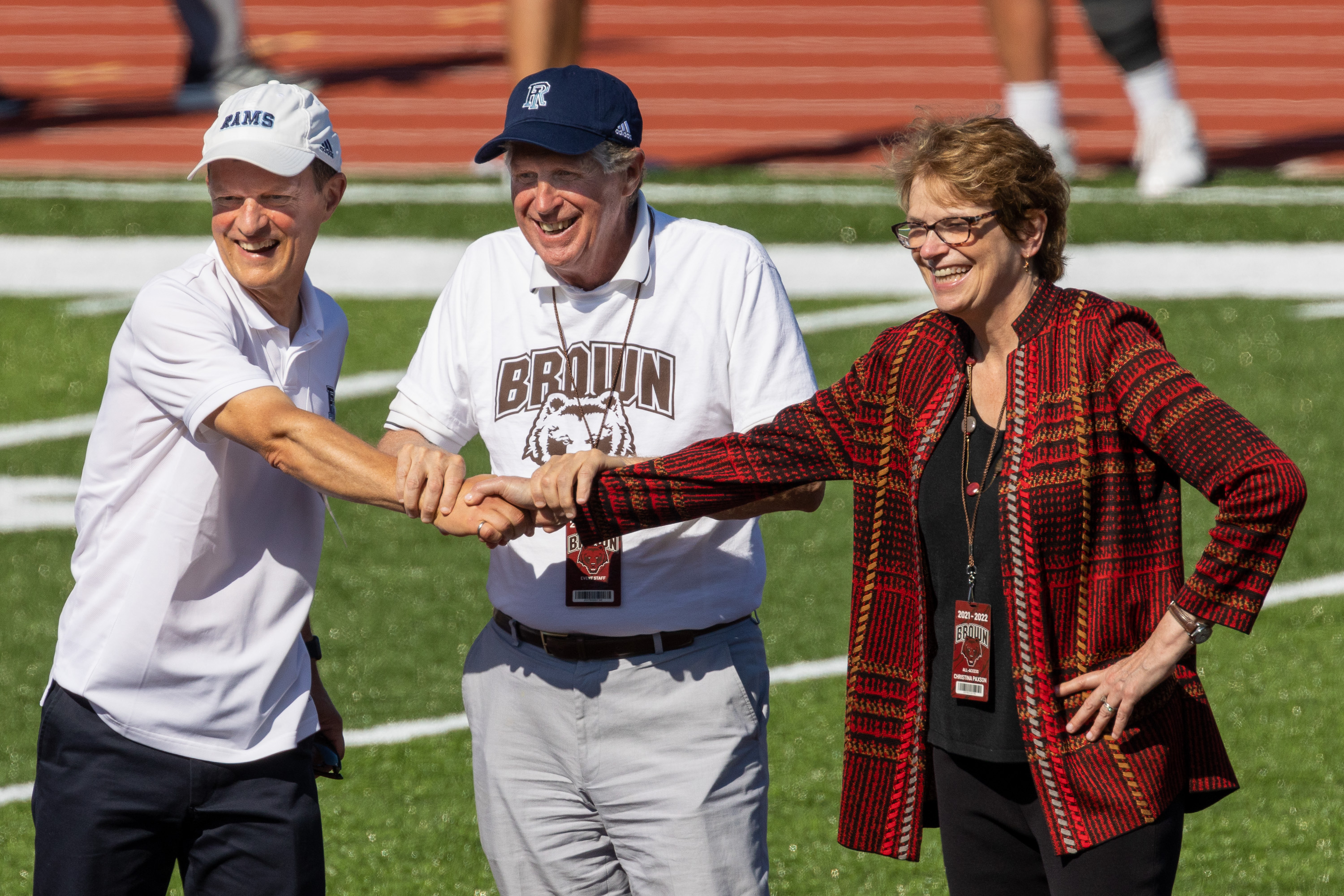
Governor Daniel McKee with URI president Marc Parlange and Brown president Christina Paxson

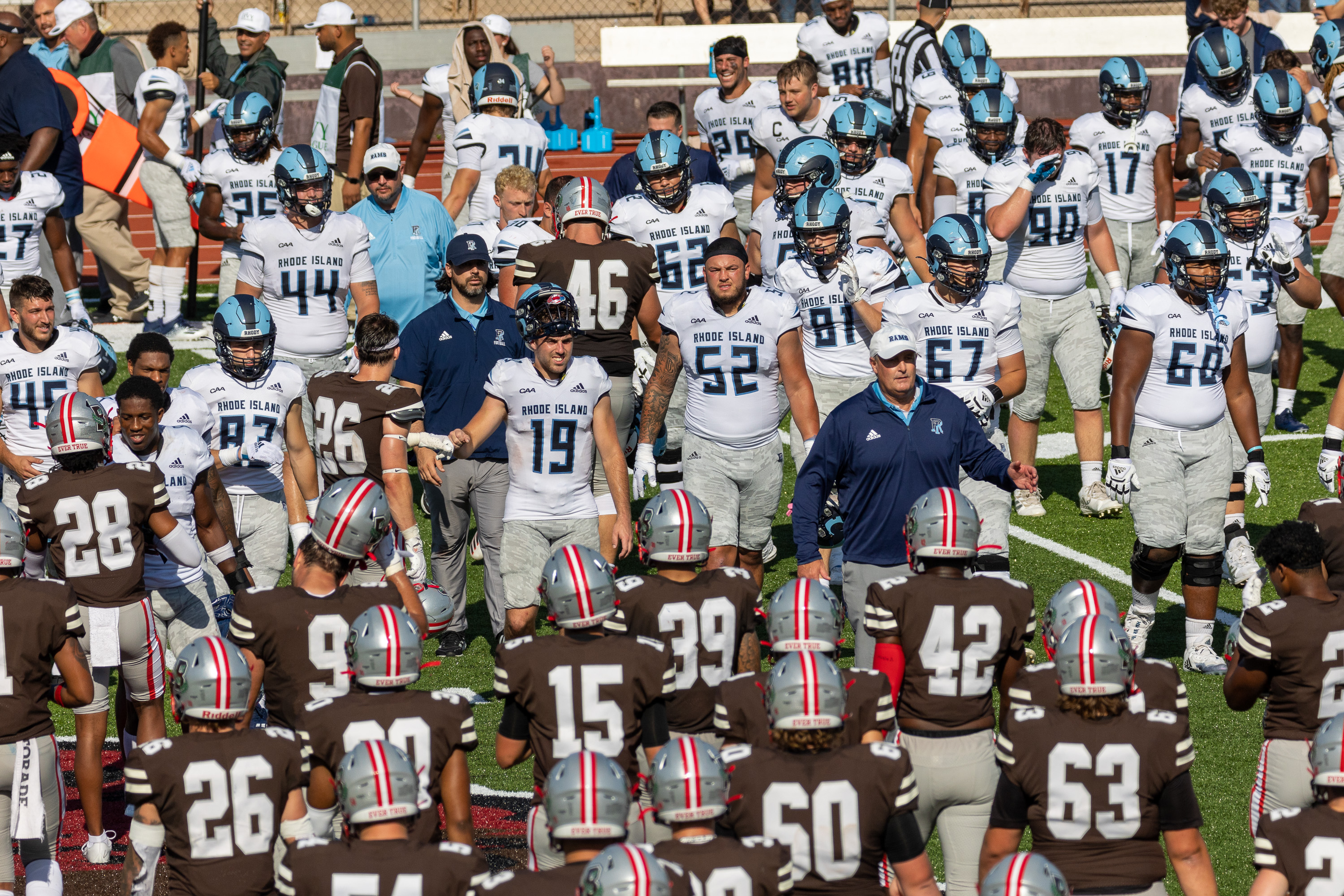
The teams meet after the game

The Brown–Rhode Island football rivalry is an American college football rivalry between the Brown Bears and Rhode Island Rams.

== History ==
The Bears and Rams have met 109 times. They have played annually since 1909, except for 1918, 1923–24, 1943–45, 1992, and 2020. Since 1981, the Governor's Cup has been given to the winner of the game. The Brown–Rhode Island game is played in late September or early October, and the venue alternates between Brown Stadium and Meade Stadium. Brown leads the series 74–34–2, but since the introduction of the Governor's Cup, the series is much closer, with Rhode Island leading 24–20.

== Game results ==
Brown victories	Rhode Island victories	Tie games

No.	Date	Location	Winner	Score
1	September 29, 1909	Providence	Brown	6–0
2	October 1, 1910	Providence	Brown	5–0
3	September 30, 1911	Providence	Brown	12–0
4	October 5, 1912	Providence	Brown	14–0
5	October 4, 1913	Providence	Brown	19–0
6	October 3, 1914	Providence	Brown	20–0
7	September 25, 1915	Providence	Brown	38–0
8	September 30, 1916	Providence	Brown	18–0
9	September 29, 1917	Providence	Brown	27–0
10	September 27, 1919	Providence	Brown	27–0
11	September 25, 1920	Providence	Brown	25–0
12	September 24, 1921	Providence	Brown	6–0
13	September 30, 1922	Providence	Brown	27–0
14	September 26, 1925	Providence	Brown	33–0
15	September 25, 1926	Providence	Brown	14–0
16	September 24, 1927	Providence	Brown	27–0
17	November 24, 1928	Providence	Brown	33–7
18	October 5, 1929	Providence	Brown	14–6
19	September 27, 1930	Providence	Brown	7–0
20	October 3, 1931	Providence	Brown	18–0
21	October 1, 1932	Providence	Brown	19–0
22	October 7, 1933	Providence	Brown	26–0
23	October 6, 1934	Providence	Brown	13–0
24	October 5, 1935	Providence	Rhode Island	13–7
25	October 3, 1936	Providence	Brown	7–6
26	October 2, 1937	Providence	Brown	13–6
27	October 22, 1938	Providence	Brown	40–21
28	September 30, 1939	Providence	Brown	34–0
29	October 5, 1940	Providence	Brown	20–17
30	October 11, 1941	Providence	Brown	14–7
31	October 3, 1942	Providence	Brown	28–0
32	October 12, 1946	Providence	Brown	29–0
33	October 11, 1947	Providence	Brown	55–6
34	October 9, 1948	Providence	Brown	33–0
35	October 8, 1949	Providence	Brown	46–0
36	October 14, 1950	Providence	Brown	55–13
37	October 13, 1951	Providence	Brown	20–13
38	October 11, 1952	Providence	Rhode Island	7–6
39	October 10, 1953	Providence	Rhode Island	19–13
40	October 9, 1954	Providence	Brown	35–0
41	October 22, 1955	Providence	Rhode Island	19–7
42	October 27, 1956	Providence	Brown	27–7
43	October 26, 1957	Providence	Brown	21–7
44	October 25, 1958	Providence	Brown	47–6
45	October 24, 1959	Providence	Brown	6–0
46	October 22, 1960	Providence	Brown	36–14
47	October 28, 1961	Providence	Rhode Island	12–9
48	October 27, 1962	Providence	Tie	12–12
49	October 26, 1963	Providence	Brown	33–7
50	October 24, 1964	Providence	Brown	30–14
51	September 25, 1965	Providence	Rhode Island	14–6
52	September 24, 1966	Providence	Brown	40–14
53	September 30, 1967	Providence	Rhode Island	12–8
54	September 28, 1968	Providence	Brown	10–9
55	September 27, 1969	Providence	Brown	21–0
56	September 26, 1970	Providence	Brown	21–14

No.	Date	Location	Winner	Score
57	September 25, 1971	Providence	Rhode Island	34–21
58	September 30, 1972	Providence	Rhode Island	21–17
59	September 29, 1973	Providence	Tie	20–20
60	September 28, 1974	Providence	Brown	45–15
61	September 27, 1975	Providence	Brown	41–20
62	September 25, 1976	Providence	Brown	3–0
63	September 24, 1977	Providence	Brown	28–10
64	September 30, 1978	Providence	Rhode Island	17–3
65	September 29, 1979	Providence	Brown	31–13
66	November 27, 1980	Providence	Brown	9–3
67	November 7, 1981	Kingston	Brown	10–8
68	September 25, 1982	Providence	Brown	24–20
69	September 24, 1983	Providence	Rhode Island	30–16
70	September 29, 1984	Providence	Rhode Island	34–13
71	September 28, 1985	Providence	Brown	32–27
72	September 27, 1986	Kingston	Brown	27–7
73	September 26, 1987	Providence	Brown	17–15
74	September 24, 1988	Kingston	Rhode Island	17–10
75	September 30, 1989	Providence	Rhode Island	18–13
76	September 22, 1990	Kingston	Rhode Island	23–3
77	October 5, 1991	Providence	Rhode Island	38–36
78	October 2, 1993	Providence	Rhode Island	30–7
79	September 24, 1994	Kingston	Brown	32–29
80	September 23, 1995	Providence	Brown	31–28
81	September 28, 1996	Kingston	Rhode Island	28–13
82	October 18, 1997	Providence	Brown	23–15
83	October 3, 1998	Kingston	Rhode Island	44–16
84	October 16, 1999	Providence	Brown	27–25
85	September 30, 2000	Kingston	Brown	29–19
86	September 29, 2001	Providence	Rhode Island	42–38
87	October 5, 2002	Kingston	Rhode Island	38–28
88	October 4, 2003	Providence	Rhode Island	27–9
89	October 2, 2004	Kingston	Brown	20–13
90	October 1, 2005	Providence	Brown	45–35
91	September 30, 2006	Kingston	Rhode Island	28–21
92	September 29, 2007	Providence	Rhode Island	49–42
93	October 4, 2008	Kingston	Rhode Island	37–13
94	October 3, 2009	Providence	Brown	28–20
95	October 2, 2010	Kingston	Rhode Island	27–24
96	October 1, 2011	Providence	Brown	35–21
97	October 6, 2012	Kingston	Brown	17–7
98	October 5, 2013	Providence	Brown	31–14
99	October 4, 2014	Kingston	Brown	20–13
100	October 3, 2015	Providence	Brown	41–31
101	October 1, 2016	Kingston	Rhode Island	28–13
102	September 30, 2017	Providence	Brown	24–21
103	October 6, 2018	Kingston	Rhode Island	48–0
104	October 5, 2019	Providence	Rhode Island	31–28
105	September 18, 2021	Providence	Rhode Island	45–24
106	October 1, 2022	Kingston	Rhode Island	38–10
107	October 7, 2023	Providence	Rhode Island	34–30
108	October 12, 2024	Kingston	Rhode Island	31–21
109	October 3, 2025	Pawtucket	Brown	28–21
110	October 3, 2026	Pawtucket	Rhode Island	13–10
Series: Brown leads 74–34–2

== See also ==
- List of NCAA college football rivalry games
- List of most-played college football series in NCAA Division I
