= Robert Carothers =

American writer, poet, and academic

Robert Lee Carothers
- Born: September 3, 1942; Sewickley, Pennsylvania
- Known for: presidency of two universities and chancellorship the Minnesota State College System
- Spouse(s): Mary Patricia Ruane (m. 1974); Jayne Richmond
- Children: 3

Academic background
- Education: Edinboro University (B.A. 1965, English); Kent State University (Ph.D. 1969, English Literature); McDowell School of Law, University of Akron (J.D. 1980)

Robert Lee Carothers (born September 3, 1942), a writer and poet, served as chancellor of the Minnesota State University System and the tenth president of the University of Rhode Island from 1991 to 2009.

== Early life and education ==
Robert Carothers was born on September 3, 1942, in Sewickley, Pennsylvania to Robert Fleming Carothers and Mary (Skinner) Carothers. He attended public schools in the Quaker Valley. Carothers received his B.A. degree from Edinboro University in Pennsylvania in 1965. He joined Delta Sigma Phi fraternity Delta Nu Chapter in 1962 and was elected the President of the Fraternity twice. From 1960 to 1968, Carothers served in the United States Army, and availed of military scholarships for his studies. On November 2, 1974, he married Mary Patricia "Pattie" Ruane (1948–2022).

Carothers earned a Ph.D. degree at Kent State University in 1969 and a J.D. degree from the McDowell School of Law, University of Akron in 1980, and he was admitted into the Pennsylvania Bar Association in 1981.

== Academic career ==
Robert Carothers began his academic career in 1969 at his alma mater Edinboro University as a professor and dean, eventually becoming its vice president. He went on to serve as president of Southwest Minnesota State University from 1983 to 1986, and chancellor of the Minnesota State University System from 1986 to 1991 before being selected as the tenth president of the University of Rhode Island. Early in his presidential tenure at URI, Carothers was faced with the takeover of Taft Hall, the oldest academic building on campus, by 200 mostly African-American students protesting racial discrimination on campus. Carothers was able to diffuse the tensions by advocating for a Multicultural Center at the heart of the campus. Throughout his tenure at URI, he was known for changing the student culture of the university from a 'party school' to an outward looking 'college with a conscience.'

He was a member of National Institute Alcohol Abuse and Alcoholism (Committee on Campus Drinking 1999 to 2002). Also during his presidential tenure, Carothers and his second wife Jayne Richmond, dean of URI's University College, were active in URI campus philanthropic projects. During his administration, there was a strengthening of anti-discrimination toward LGBTQ members of the campus community. He retired from academia in May 2009 and David M. Dooley, former Provost at Montana State University, took over as the URI's 11th President.

== Retirement and honors ==
In their retirement from URI, Carothers and Jayne Richmond have been engaged in academic consulting. Carothers has been honored recipient of several awards, including the Humanitarian Award, from the Urban League of Rhode Island, 2000; the Jean Hicks Award, Rhode Island Conference for Community and Justice, 2000; History Makers Salute from Rhode Island Historical Society 2001; the Silver Anniversary Honor Roll Award, American Cancer Society, and the Council Fellows Mentor Award, from the American Council of Education in 2005. The main library at the URI campus has been named the Robert L. Carothers Library and Learning Commons. Carothers was also honored in 2017 by the University with an honorary doctorate for his services to the University and the State of Rhode Island.

== Selected publications ==
- Carothers, R.L. (1966). Muskrat. Kent Quarterly 10(3):1-18.
- Carothers, R.L., and J.L. Marsh.(1971). The Whale and the Panorama. Nineteenth-Century Fiction 26(3):319-328. DOI:10.2307/2933209.
- Carothers, R.L. (1992). Recreating the research university: Cutting the Gordian Knot. Speech at the URI Centennial. 14pp.
- Carothers, R.L. and M.L. Sevigny (1993). Classism and quality. pp. 13–15 in New Directions for Institutional Research. San Francisco: Wiley Subscription Services, Inc., A Wiley Company DOI:10.1002/ir.37019937804
- Carothers, R.L. (2004). Declaring Independence: A New Model for Public Presidents. Connection, New England's Journal of Higher Education. 19(2):17-18.
- Carothers, R.L., M.D. Wood, and F. Cohen. (2006). Common ground on curbing campus drinking. Trusteeship 14(6):19-23.

Academic offices
Preceded by Edward D. Eddy	President of the University of Rhode Island; 1991 – 2006	Succeeded by David M. Dooley
