= David M. Dooley =

American chemist (born 1952)

David Marlin Dooley

11th President of the University of Rhode Island
- In office July 2009 – July 31, 2021
- Preceded by: Robert Carothers
- Succeeded by: Marc Parlange

Personal details
- Born: May 13, 1952 (age 74) Tulare County, California, U.S.
- Spouse: Rev. Lynn Erville Baker
- Scientific career
- Education: University of California, San Diego (BS); California Institute of Technology (PhD)
- Known for: Characterization of organometallic compounds
- Fields: Bioinorganic chemistry
- Workplaces: Amherst College; University of Massachusetts, Amherst; Montana State University (provost); University of Rhode Island (president)
- Thesis: Spectroscopic and magnetic studies of the coordination environment and electronic structure of copper sites in blue copper oxidases (1979)
- Doctoral advisor: Harry B. Gray

David Marlin Dooley (born 13 May 1952) is an American chemist with expertise in organometallic compounds, and university administrator who has served as Provost of Montana State University and the eleventh president of the University of Rhode Island.

== Early life and education ==
Dooley was born May 13, 1952, in Tulare County, California, to Walter Marvin Dooley and Mary Frances (Leonard) Dooley. He attended Foothill Aurora High School in Bakersfield, California, and he married Lynn Erville Baker, an ordained Baptist Minister, on Nov. 24, 1978 in Nobles County, Minnesota. He earned his bachelor's degree in 1974 at the University of California, San Diego and his Ph.D. degree in 1979 at California Institute of Technology in Pasadena, California.

== Academic career ==
Dooley's first academic appointment was as an instructor of chemistry at Amherst College in 1978, where he remained until 1993 when he assumed his position as head of the department of chemistry and biochemistry at Montana State University. Between 1984 and 1993, Dooley held a joint appointment as a chemistry professor at the University of Massachusetts, Amherst, where he conducted much of his research into organometallic chemistry. In 1993, he joined the faculty of Montana State University as the chairperson of the department of chemistry and biochemistry. In 1999, he was appointed as interim provost, and in 2001, he was named as the permanent provost. In 2009, he joined the University of Rhode Island as its eleventh president and primarily focused on enhancing the global reach of the university and its research programs. Throughout his career as an administrator at both MSU and URI, he maintained his research program as an active scientist.

== Legacy ==
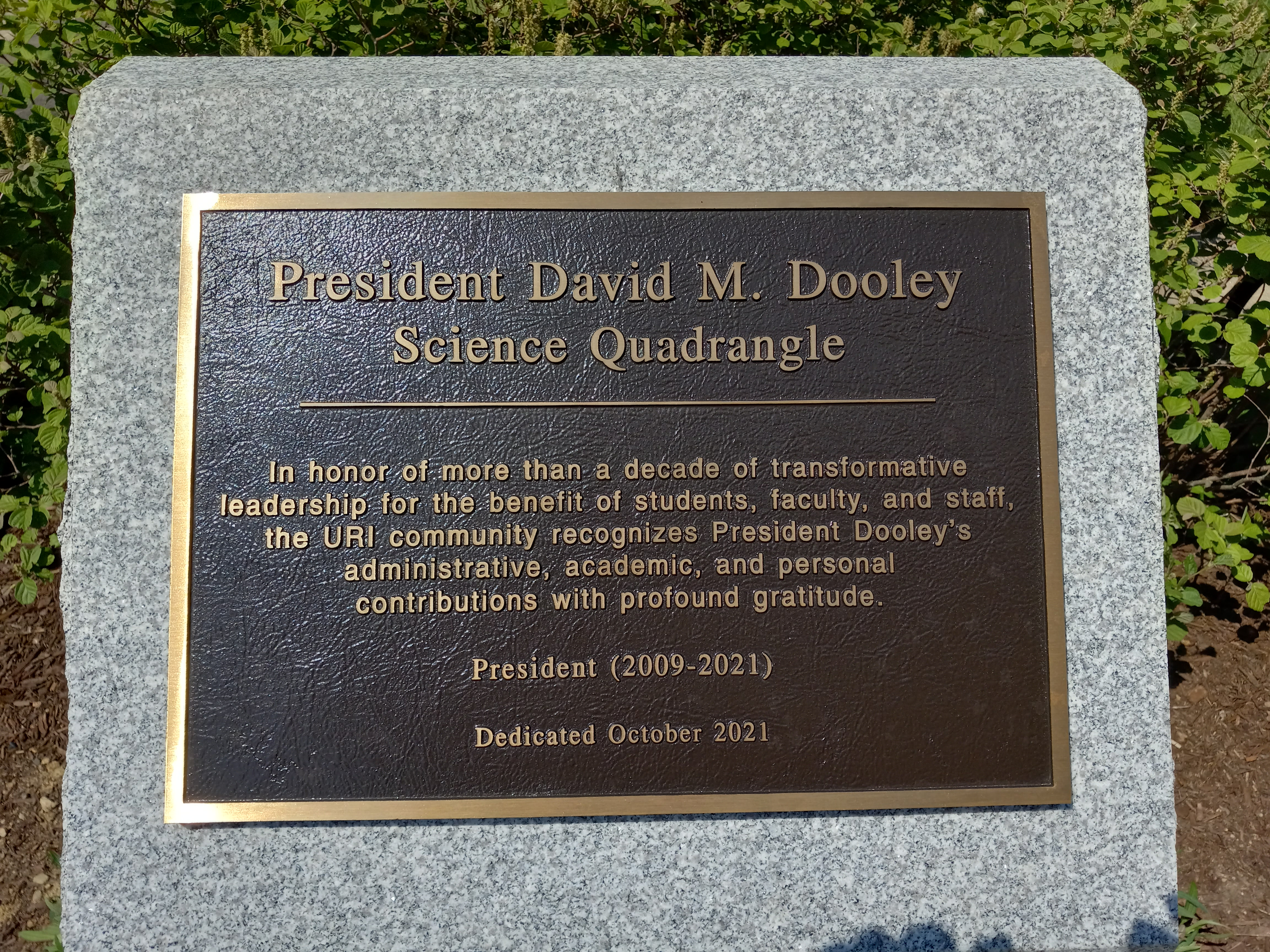
David M. Dooley Science Quadrangle Marker at the University of Rhode Island

Upon the Dooley's retirement from the University of Rhode Island, the University of Rhode Island Board of Trustees approved naming of the President David M. Dooley Science Quadrangle in his honor.

== Selected works ==
- Solomon, Edward I.; Hare, Jeffrey W.; Dooley, David M.; Dawson, John H.; Stephens, Philip J.; Gray, Harry B. (January 1980). "Spectroscopic studies of stellacyanin, plastocyanin, and azurin. Electronic structure of the blue copper sites". Journal of the American Chemical Society. 102 (1): 168–178. Bibcode:1980JAChS.102..168S. doi:10.1021/ja00521a029.
- Dooley, David M.; McGuirl, Michele A.; Brown, Doreen E.; Turowski, Petra N.; Mclntire, William S.; Knowles, Peter F. (January 1991). "A Cu(I)-semiquinone state in substrate-reduced amine oxidases". Nature. 349 (6306): 262–264. Bibcode:1991Natur.349..262D. doi:10.1038/349262a0. PMID 1846226. S2CID 4306816.
- Kumar, Vinay; Dooley, David M; Freeman, Hans C; Guss, J Mitchell; Harvey, Ian; McGuirl, Michele A; Wilce, Matthew CJ; Zubak, Vilma M (August 1996). "Crystal structure of a eukaryotic (pea seedling) copper-containing amine oxidase at 2.2 å resolution". Structure. 4 (8): 943–955. doi:10.1016/S0969-2126(96)00101-3. PMID 8805580.
- Wilce, Matthew C. J.; Dooley, David M.; Freeman, Hans C.; Guss, J. Mitchell; Matsunami, Hideyuki; McIntire, William S.; Ruggiero, Christy E.; Tanizawa, Katsuyuki; Yamaguchi, Hiroshi (December 1997). "Crystal Structures of the Copper-Containing Amine Oxidase from Arthrobacter globiformis in the Holo and Apo Forms: Implications for the Biogenesis of Topaquinone". Biochemistry. 36 (51): 16116–16133. doi:10.1021/bi971797i. PMID 9405045.
- Rasmussen, Tim; Berks, Ben C.; Sanders-Loehr, Joann; Dooley, David M.; Zumft, Walter G.; Thomson, Andrew J. (October 2000). "The Catalytic Center in Nitrous Oxide Reductase, Cu_{Z}, Is a Copper−Sulfide Cluster". Biochemistry. 39 (42): 12753–12756. doi:10.1021/bi001811i. PMID 11041839.
- Zhu, Hui; Xie, Gang; Liu, Mengyao; Olson, John S.; Fabian, Marian; Dooley, David M.; Lei, Benfang (June 2008). "Pathway for Heme Uptake from Human Methemoglobin by the Iron-regulated Surface Determinants System of Staphylococcus aureus". Journal of Biological Chemistry. 283 (26): 18450–18460. doi:10.1074/jbc.M801466200. PMC 2440603. PMID 18467329.
- Adelson, Charles N.; Johnston, Esther M.; Hilmer, Kimberly M.; Watts, Hope; Dey, Somdatta Ghosh; Brown, Doreen E.; Broderick, Joan B.; Shepard, Eric M.; Dooley, David M.; Solomon, Edward I. (5 June 2019). "Characterization of the Preprocessed Copper Site Equilibrium in Amine Oxidase and Assignment of the Reactive Copper Site in Topaquinone Biogenesis". Journal of the American Chemical Society. 141 (22): 8877–8890. Bibcode:2019JAChS.141.8877A. doi:10.1021/jacs.9b01922. PMC 6568004. PMID 31060358.
- Lim, Hyeongtaek; Baker, Michael L.; Cowley, Ryan E.; Kim, Sunghee; Bhadra, Mayukh; Siegler, Maxime A.; Kroll, Thomas; Sokaras, Dimosthenis; Weng, Tsu-Chien; Biswas, Dalia R.; Dooley, David M.; Karlin, Kenneth D.; Hedman, Britt; Hodgson, Keith O.; Solomon, Edward I. (16 November 2020). "Kβ X-ray Emission Spectroscopy as a Probe of Cu(I) Sites: Application to the Cu(I) Site in Preprocessed Galactose Oxidase". Inorganic Chemistry. 59 (22): 16567–16581. doi:10.1021/acs.inorgchem.0c02495. PMC 7799175. PMID 33136386.

Academic offices
| Preceded by Robert Carothers | 11th President of University of Rhode Island; 1991–2009 | Succeeded by Marc Parlange |
