= Maxwell Aitken =

Maxwell or Max Aitken may refer to:

- Max Aitken, 1st Baron Beaverbrook (William Maxwell Aitken, 1879–1964)
- Sir Max Aitken, 2nd Baronet (John William Maxwell Aitken, 1910–1985), briefly 2nd Baron Beaverbrook
- Maxwell Aitken, 3rd Baron Beaverbrook (Maxwell William Humphrey Aitken, born 1951)
  - his son Maxwell Francis Aitken (born 1977), and his son Maxwell Alfonso Aitken (2014)

== See also ==
- Baron Beaverbrook
