= Maxwell Gregory =

Maxwell Gregory was Archdeacon of Singapore from 1945 until 1947.

Gregory was educated at St John's College, Durham; and ordained in 1938. After a curacy at St Margaret, Leicester he was a Chaplain to the Forces (mentioned in despatches, 1945). He was Vicar of Hungarton before his time as Archdeacon; and of Isel, Cumbria afterwards.
