= Zimbabwe First Party =

Political party in Zimbabwe

- President: Maxwell Zeb Shumba
- Founded: 10 April 2015

Website
- www.zimfirst.org

Zimbabwe First Party (ZimFirst) is a political party in Zimbabwe which was founded on 10 April 2015. The party was founded by its current President Maxwell Zeb Shumba, who once served as the Chief Political Strategist for the other opposition political party's leader Morgan Tsvangirai. According to the official statement posted on the party's website, ZimFirst 's main objective is to form the next government through the electoral process, National elections in Zimbabwe are slated for 2018 and the party states that it will contest the presidential and parliamentary election. According to the party's manifesto primary focus of its government would be to re build the economy from an alleged US$4 billion to a "near US$1,5 trillion robust economy". At the time, Morgan Tsvangirai's spokesperson said he was unmoved by Shumba’s departure to form a new party. The Party slogan is Nyika Vanhu, Vanhu Ndiyo Nyika (Shona language version), Abantu Ilizwe, Yilizwe Ngabantu (Ndebele language version). Its ideology is enshrined in the three key principles of Honesty, Accountability, and Unity.
