= Maxwell Zeb Shumba =

Maxwell Shumba is the founding president of the Zimbabwe First Party. He is a former chemistry educator and researcher and a global regulatory chemical compliance expert. He has publications in reputable journals . Shumba taught at Nyatsime College in Mashonaland West, Zimbabwe, where he was Acting Vice Principal, Prince Edward School in Harare and Caprivi Senior Secondary School in Namibia.

== Political background ==
Maxwell Shumba is a former member of National Constitutional Assembly (NCA) in Zimbabwe; when he attended the 28–29 February 1999 People's Working Convention as a delegate at Chitungwiza's Aquatic Center. Dr. Shumba served in MDC-T as Vice Chairman MDC Ohio Branch (USA), Chairman MDC Greater Cincinnati Branch (USA), Chairman of MDC North America Province (NAP) and Chairman of MDC USA Province when NAP changed structure. He also served as Political Strategist to the MDC T President Morgan Tsvangirai.

Shumba has appeared on various radio and print media platforms as a political analyst and critic of Robert Mugabe's government.

He left MDC-T to found the Zimbabwe First Party also known as (ZimFirst).
