= Maxwell Mays =

American painter (1918–2009)

- Born: Harry Maxwell Mays; August 13, 1918; Providence, Rhode Island
- Died: November 16, 2009 (aged 91); Coventry, Rhode Island
- Education: Rhode Island School of Design
- Known for: Painting

Maxwell Mays (August 13, 1918 – November 16, 2009) was an American painter known for his whimsical depictions of Rhode Island.

== Early life and education ==
Harry Maxwell Mays was born August 13, 1918, in Providence, Rhode Island to W. Clarke S. Mays Sr and Alice Hill Mays. He was one of three children; he had a brother, W. Clarke S. Mays, Jr., and a sister, Alice Mays Gray. The family was well-to-do, as his father had invented the metal pen clip that was the mainstay of the family business, the Mays Manufacturing Co. As a child, Mays attended Saturday morning art classes at the Rhode Island School of Design. Later, he attended RISD, graduating in 1941.

== Career ==
After serving in a map-making unit in Brazil during World War II, Mays returned to Providence, where he began exhibiting his work at local galleries. His first one-man commercial show was at the Ferargil Gallery in New York in 1948. In the ensuing years he became notable for a number of highly successful art shows and magazine covers, including Yankee Magazine, featuring traditional New England scenes, and was a highly sought-after speaker and storyteller. As a successful businessman, he was treasurer of Mays Manufacturing Company, a family business until its sale in the mid-1980s. He was Past President and Director Emeritus of the Providence Art Club where the main gallery is named in his honor. He led the drive for a major restoration of the historic property in the late 1970s.

== Death and afterward ==
Maxwell Mays died at his home in the Greene section of Coventry, Rhode Island on November 16, 2009.

== Awards and honors ==
Mays received honorary doctorates from Rhode Island College and Johnson & Wales University. He was named an Honorary Rhode Island Commodore in 1986 by governor Edward D. DiPrete. The Rhode Island Audubon Society serve as caretakers of the Maxwell Mays Wildlife Refuge on his farm estate in Coventry, Rhode Island.
