= Maxwell Ariston Burgess =

Bermudian politician

Maxwell Ariston Burgess was a member of the parliament of Bermuda for the United Bermuda Party for the constituency of Hamilton West. He was minister of youth, sport and recreation.
