= Development finance =

Development finance is a branch of development studies that deals with financing of economic and social development. It typically involves both the mobilisation and dispersion of domestic and international sources of finance. At the international level Foreign Aid, in particular Official Development Assistance (ODA), Development aid and charitable and philanthropic contributions, and Foreign Direct Investment (FDI), and flows of remittances from overseas workers are looked at. Domestically both the traditional banking sector and the less formal sectors are investigated as is Microfinance. The activities and role of Development finance institutions (DFIs) both national and international ones form a large part of the subject matter analysed.

Tony Atkinson (2004), concentrating on looking for new sources of funding development, lists the following:

- Global environmental taxes
- Currency transactions tax (Tobin tax)
- Special Drawing Rights (SDRs)
- International Finance Facility (IFF)
- Private donations
- Global lotteries or premium bonds
- Remittances from emigrants

== A glossary ==
Saldinger (2017) has provided a useful glossary of development finance terminology. The terms include:

- Results-based financing, (performance-based financing or pay-for-success)
- Social impact bonds
- Development impact bonds
- Blended finance or blended capital
- Concessional loans
- Loan guarantee
- Impact investing
- Green bonds, climate bonds and more
- Domestic resource mobilization
- Venture capital
- Remittances
- Diaspora bonds

Other topics that are typically looked at include: Financial repression and financial liberalisation; The Political economy of development finance; Financial crises and development; Financing Small and medium enterprises in developing countries

== Journals ==
There are several academic journals devoted to its study. These include:

- Review of Development Finance, Sabinet African Journals
- Finance and Development, IMF
- African Development Finance Journal (ADFJ), University of Nairobi.
