= Marc Parlange =

American academic

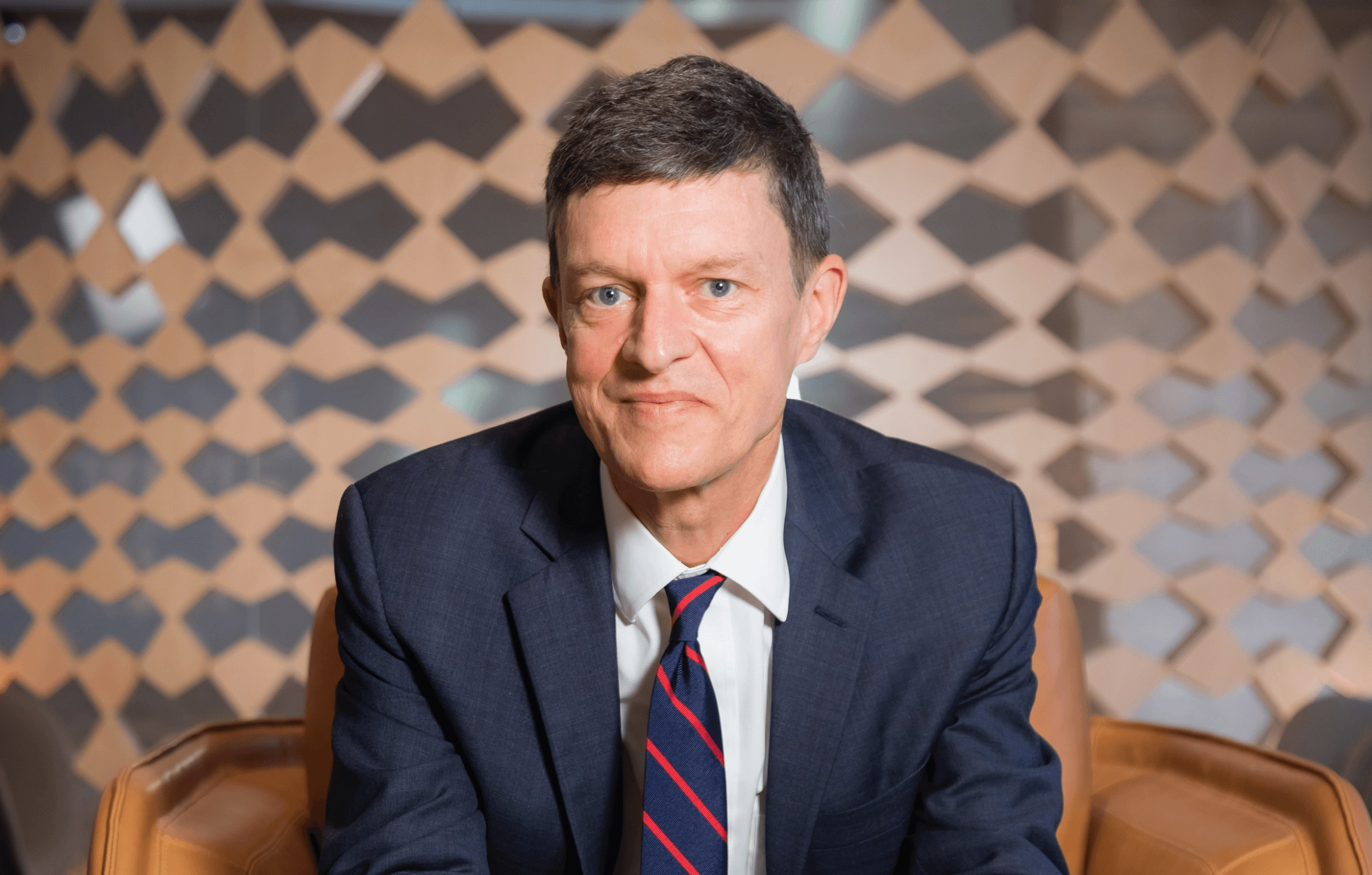
- Parlange in 2021

12th President of the University of Rhode Island
- Incumbent
- Assumed office August 1, 2021
- Preceded by: David M. Dooley

Personal details
- Born: July 5, 1962 (age 63) Providence, Rhode Island, U.S.
- Education: Griffith University (BS); Cornell University (MS, PhD)
- Scientific career
- Fields: Hydrology
- Institutions: University of California, Davis; Johns Hopkins University; Ecole Polytechnique Fédérale de Lausanne; University of British Columbia; Monash University; University of Rhode Island
- Thesis: Regional Scale Land-Atmosphere Interaction over Complex Forest Terrain (1990)
- Doctoral advisor: Wilfried Brutsaert

Marc Brendan Parlange (born 1962) is an American civil engineer who has been serving as the 12th president of the University of Rhode Island since August 2021. He previously served as provost of Monash University in Australia from 2017 to 2021. His field of study is in environmental fluid mechanics and research in hydrology and climate change.

== Career ==
- 2021–present: President, University of Rhode Island
- 2017-2021: Provost and Senior Vice-President, Monash University
- 2013-2017: Dean, Faculty of Applied Science (Engineering, Architecture, Planning, Nursing), University of British Columbia
- 2008-2013: Dean, School of Architecture, Civil and Environmental Engineering, EPFL
- 2004-2008: Professor, School of Architecture, Civil and Environmental, Ecole Polytechnique Fédérale de Lausanne (EPFL), Switzerland
- 1996-2004: Professor, Department of Geography and Environmental Engineering, School of Engineering, Johns Hopkins University
- 1990-1996: Assistant and Associate Professor, Department of Land, Air and Water Resources, and Department of Biological and Agricultural Engineering, University of California Davis

=== The Melbourne Experiment ===
In March 2020, the Victorian Government announced a shutdown of non-essential venues and services to help contain the spread of the COVID-19 virus. With the implementation of the restrictions, Parlange established the Melbourne Experiment to bring together research expertise across Monash University to monitor and analyse elements of the urban environment before, during and after the COVID-19 shutdown.

== Awards and honors ==
- 2020: Hydrologic Sciences Medal, American Meteorological Society (Centennial)
- 2020: Fellow, American Meteorological Society
- 2017: Member, U.S. National Academy of Engineering
- 2017: Fellow, Canadian Academy of Engineering

Academic offices
Preceded by David M. Dooley	12th President of University of Rhode Island; 2021 -	Incumbent
