= University of Rhode Island =

Public university in Kingston, Rhode Island, U.S.

Coordinates: 41.48071°N 71.52580°W

- Former names: Rhode Island College of Agriculture and the Mechanic Arts (1892–1909); Rhode Island State College (1909–1951)
- Motto: Hope
- Type: Public land-grant research university
- Established: May 19, 1892; 134 years ago
- Accreditation: NECHE
- Academic affiliations: Sea-grant; Space-grant
- Endowment: $278.7 million (2025)
- President: Marc Parlange
- Provost: Barbara E. Wolfe
- Academic staff: 784 full-time, 364 part-time
- Students: 17,210 (fall 2024)
- Undergraduates: 14,376 (fall 2024)
- Postgraduates: 2,834 (fall 2024)
- Location: Kingston, Rhode Island, United States
- Campus: 1,254 acres (5.07 km^{2}); Large Suburb
- Other campuses: Narragansett; Providence; West Greenwich
- Newspaper: The Good 5¢ Cigar
- Colors: Navy Blue and Keaney Blue
- Nickname: Rams
- Sporting affiliations: NCAA Division I FCS - Atlantic 10; CAA Football; NEISA
- Mascot: Rhody the Ram
- Website: uri.edu
- University of Rhode Island Historic District
- U.S. National Register of Historic Places
- U.S. Historic district
- NRHP reference No.: 100001745
- Added to NRHP: November 9, 2017

The University of Rhode Island (URI) is a public land-grant research university with its main campus in Kingston, Rhode Island, United States. It serves as the state's flagship public research institution and land-grant university of Rhode Island. The university is classified among "R1: Doctoral Universities – Very high research activity". As of 2019, URI enrolled 14,653 undergraduate students, 1,982 graduate students, and 1,339 non-degree students, making it the largest university in the state.

Its main campus is located in the village of Kingston in southern Rhode Island. Satellite campuses include the Rhode Island Nursing Education Center in Providence's Jewelry District, the Narragansett Bay Campus in Narragansett, and the W. Alton Jones Campus in West Greenwich, which closed in June of 2020 due to the coronavirus pandemic. The university offers bachelor's degrees, master's degrees, and doctoral degrees in 80 undergraduate and 49 graduate areas of study through nine academic schools and colleges. Another college, University College for Academic Success, serves primarily as an advising college for all incoming undergraduates and follows them through their first two years of enrollment at URI.

== History ==
The University of Rhode Island was first chartered as the Rhode Island State Agricultural School, associated with the state agricultural experiment station, in 1888. The site of the school was originally the Oliver Watson Farm in Kingston, whose original farmhouse is now a small museum. In 1892, the school was reorganized as the Rhode Island College of Agriculture and Mechanic Arts. That year, it extended courses of study from two years to four years; URI recognizes 1892 as its founding date. The first class had only seventeen students, each completing their course of study in two years. In 1909, the school's name was again changed to Rhode Island State College as the school's programs were expanded beyond its original agricultural education mandate.

The college graduated its first African American student, Harvey Robert Turner, in 1914. Turner majored in civil engineering, competed on the college's football and track teams, and received a Bachelor of Science degree. He went on to teach at Prairie View A&M University, where he also served as treasurer.

In 1951 the school was given its current title through an act of the General Assembly following the addition of the College of Arts and Sciences and the offering of doctoral degrees. The Board of Governors for Higher Education, appointed by the governor, became the governing body of the university in 1981 during the presidency of Frank Newman (1974–1983). The Board of Governors was replaced by the Rhode Island Board of Education in 2013, and by a 17-member Board of Trustees in 2019.

In 2013 the faculty adopted an open-access policy to make its scholarship publicly accessible online.

=== Presidents ===
Twelve individuals have served as president, and three others have served as acting president of the University of Rhode Island. Marc B. Parlange is the current president, having served since August 2021.

== Main campus ==
URI's main campus is located in northern South Kingstown, and most of the university property is in the Kingston census-designated place.

The campus is accessed via Rhode Island Route 138 from either the west (Interstate 95) or east (United States Route 1). The campus was mostly farmland when it was purchased by the state in 1888, and still includes the c. 1796 Oliver Watson Farmhouse. The early buildings of the campus are set around its main quadrangle, and were built out of locally quarried granite. The campus master plan was developed by the noted landscape architects Olmsted, Olmsted & Eliot in the 1890s. The central portion of the campus, where most of its pre-1950 buildings are located, was listed on the National Register of Historic Places in 2017.

=== Main Campus Gallery ===
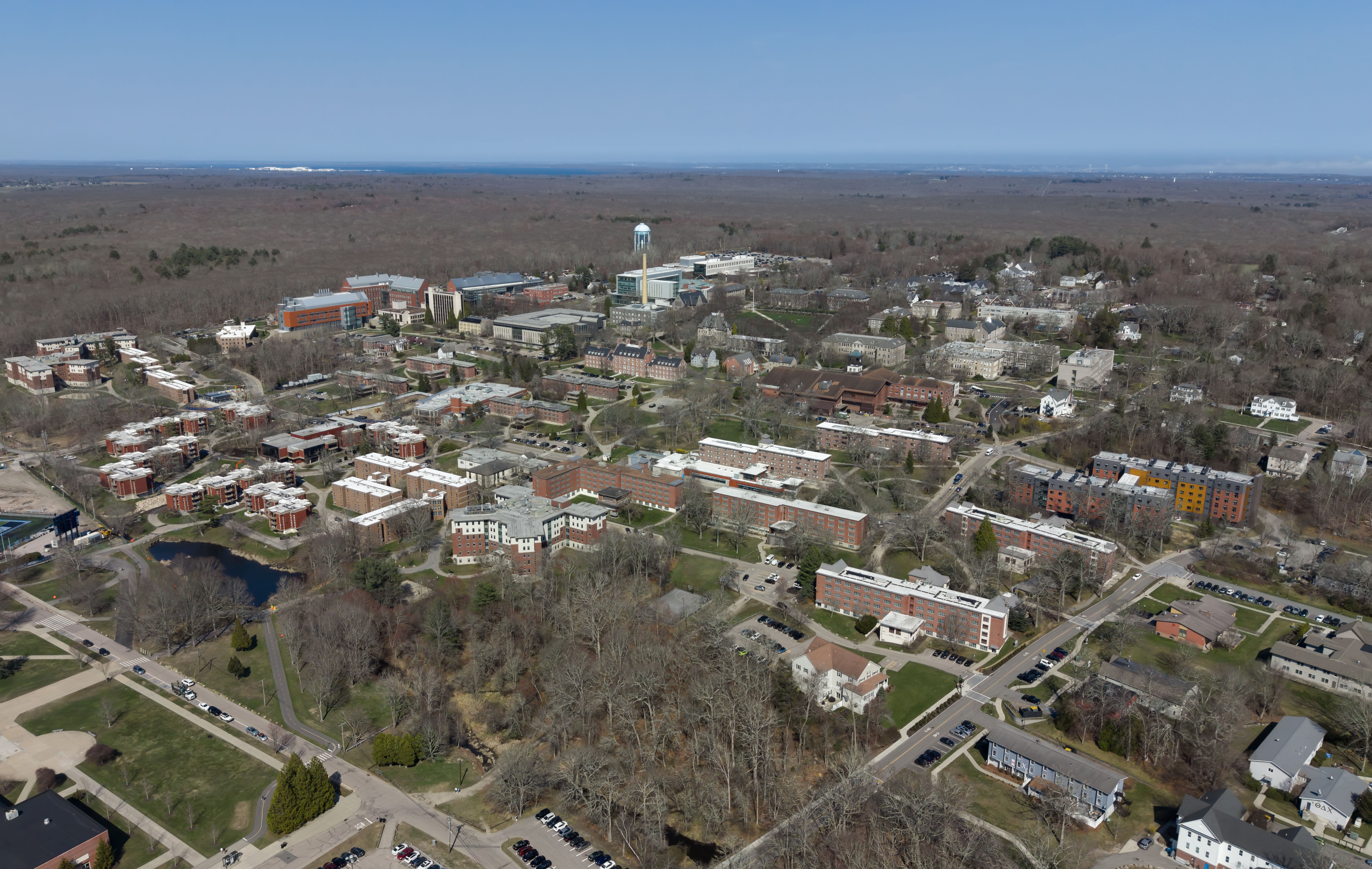
Aerial view of campus

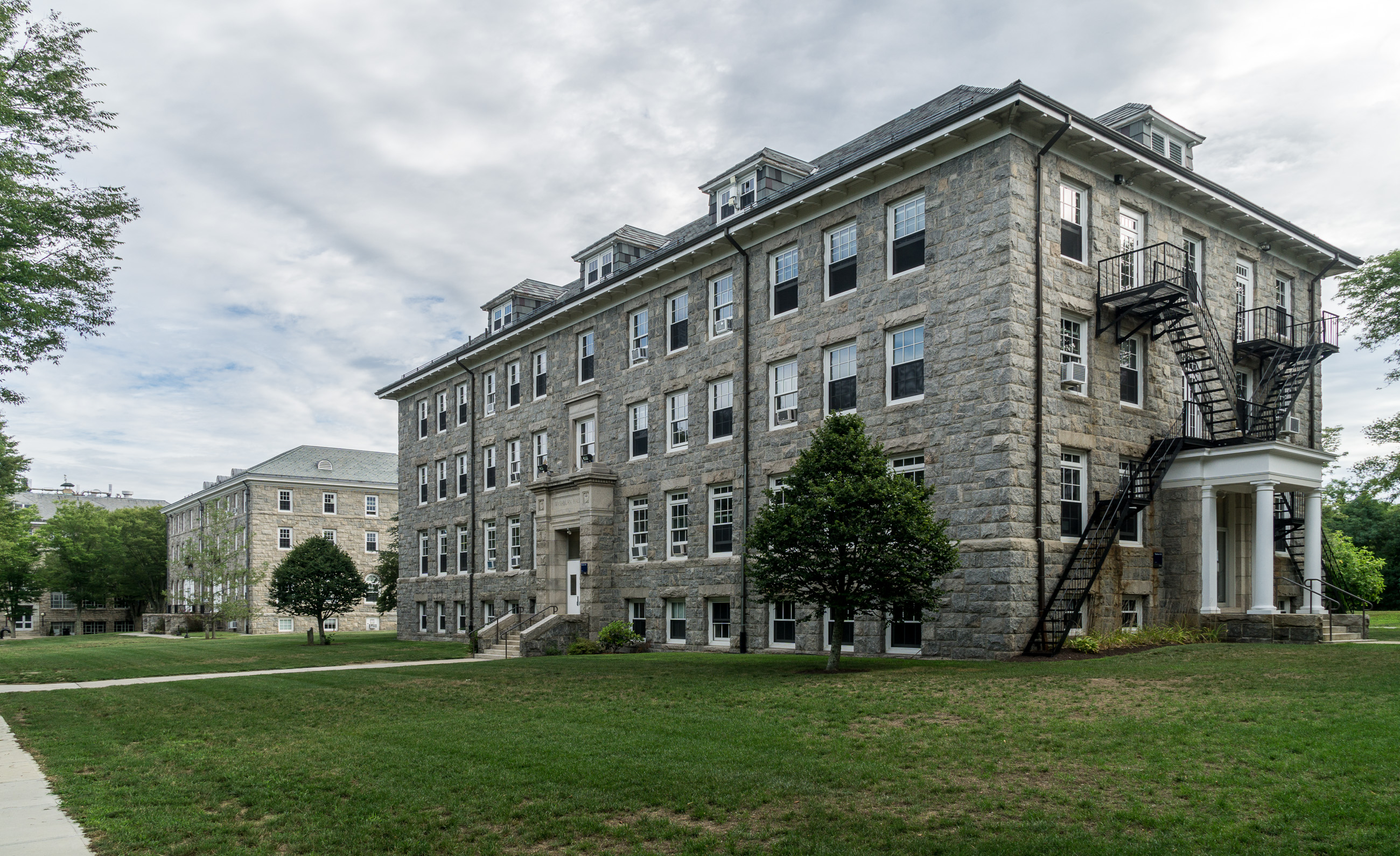
East Hall (1909) and Washburn Hall (1921)

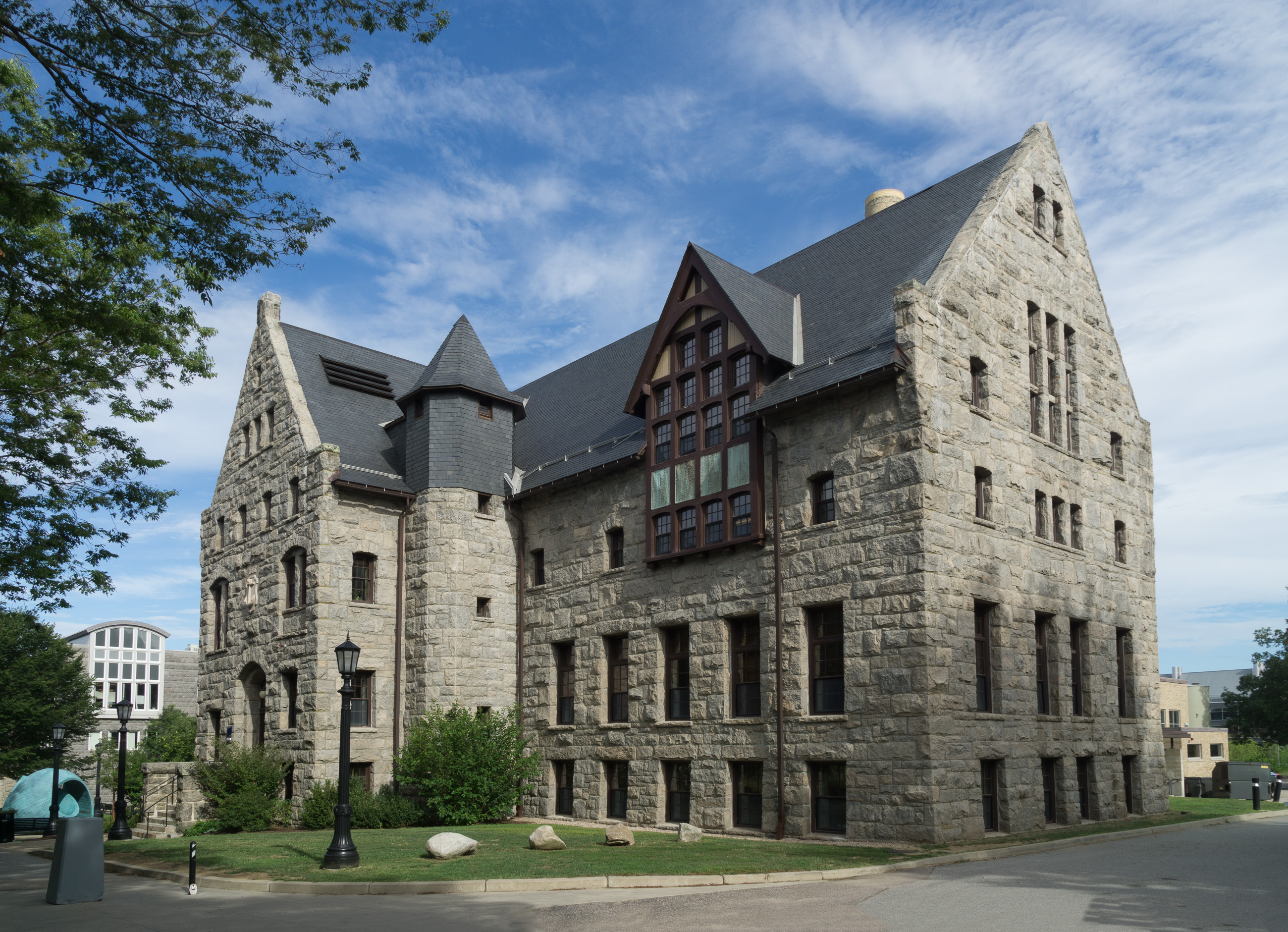
Lippitt Hall, named for Governor Charles W. Lippitt, was originally a drill hall and armory (1897)

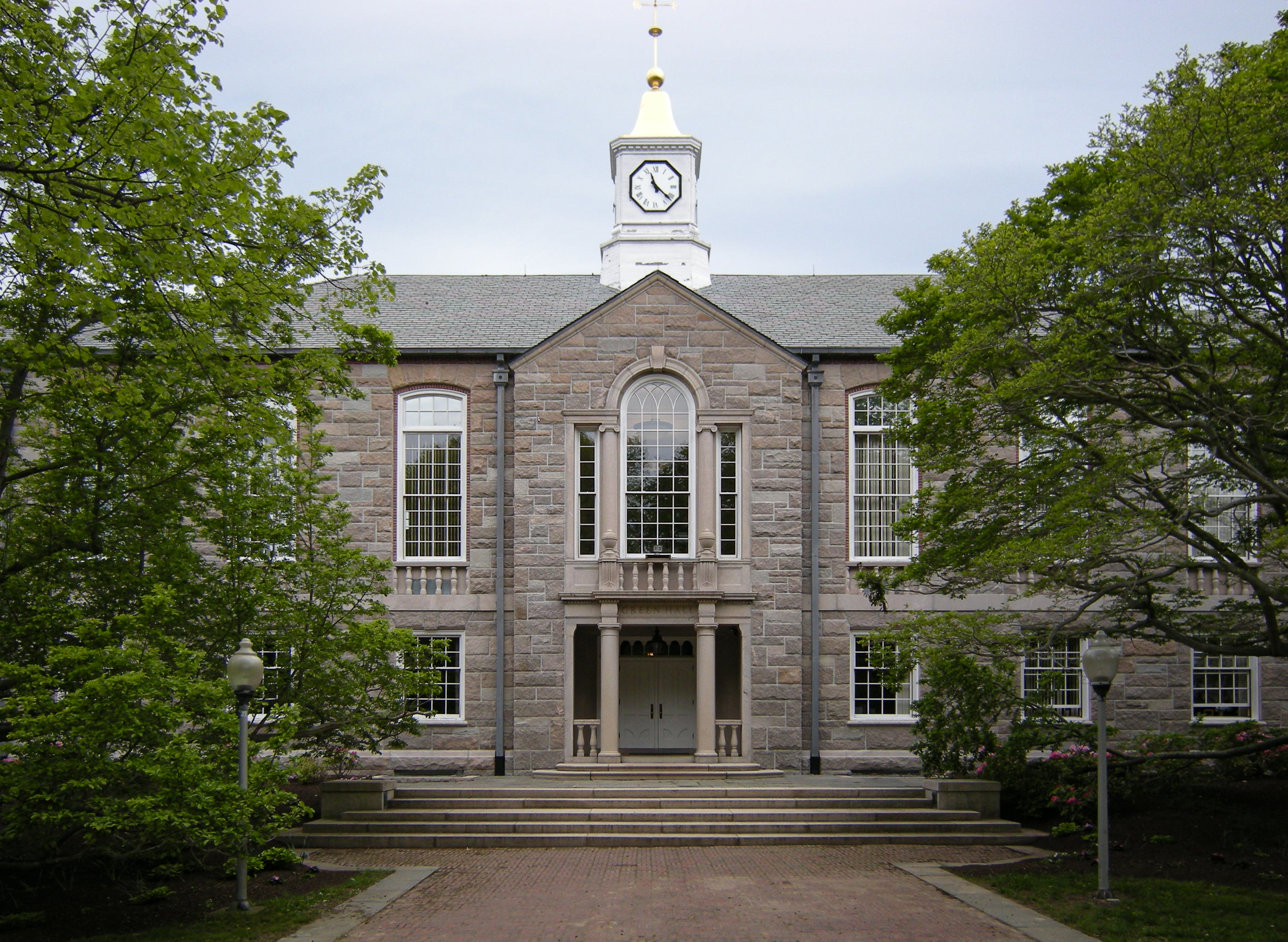
Green Hall, named for Theodore F. Green (1937)

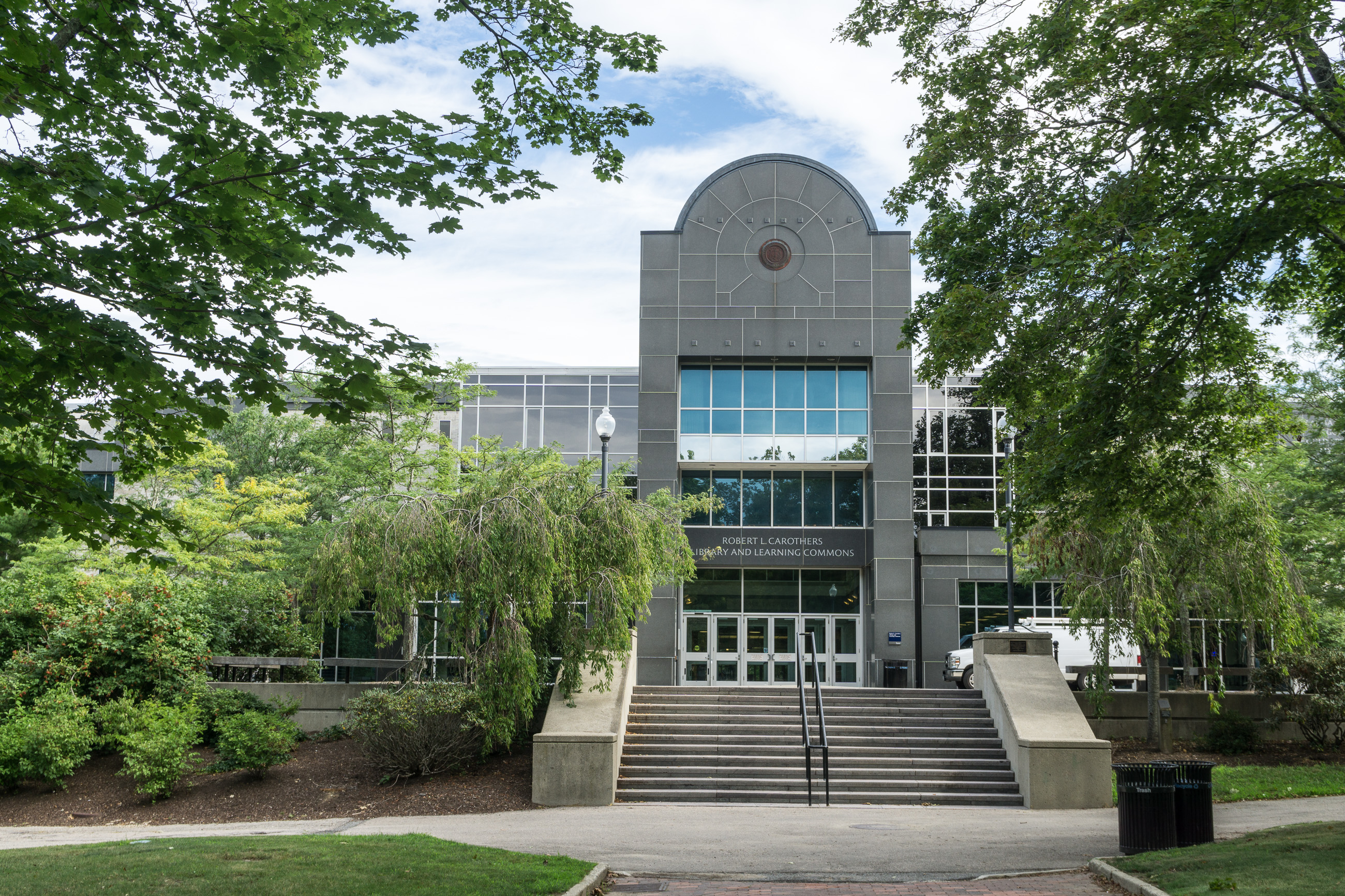
Robert L. Carothers Library and Learning Commons (built 1965, renovated 1991)

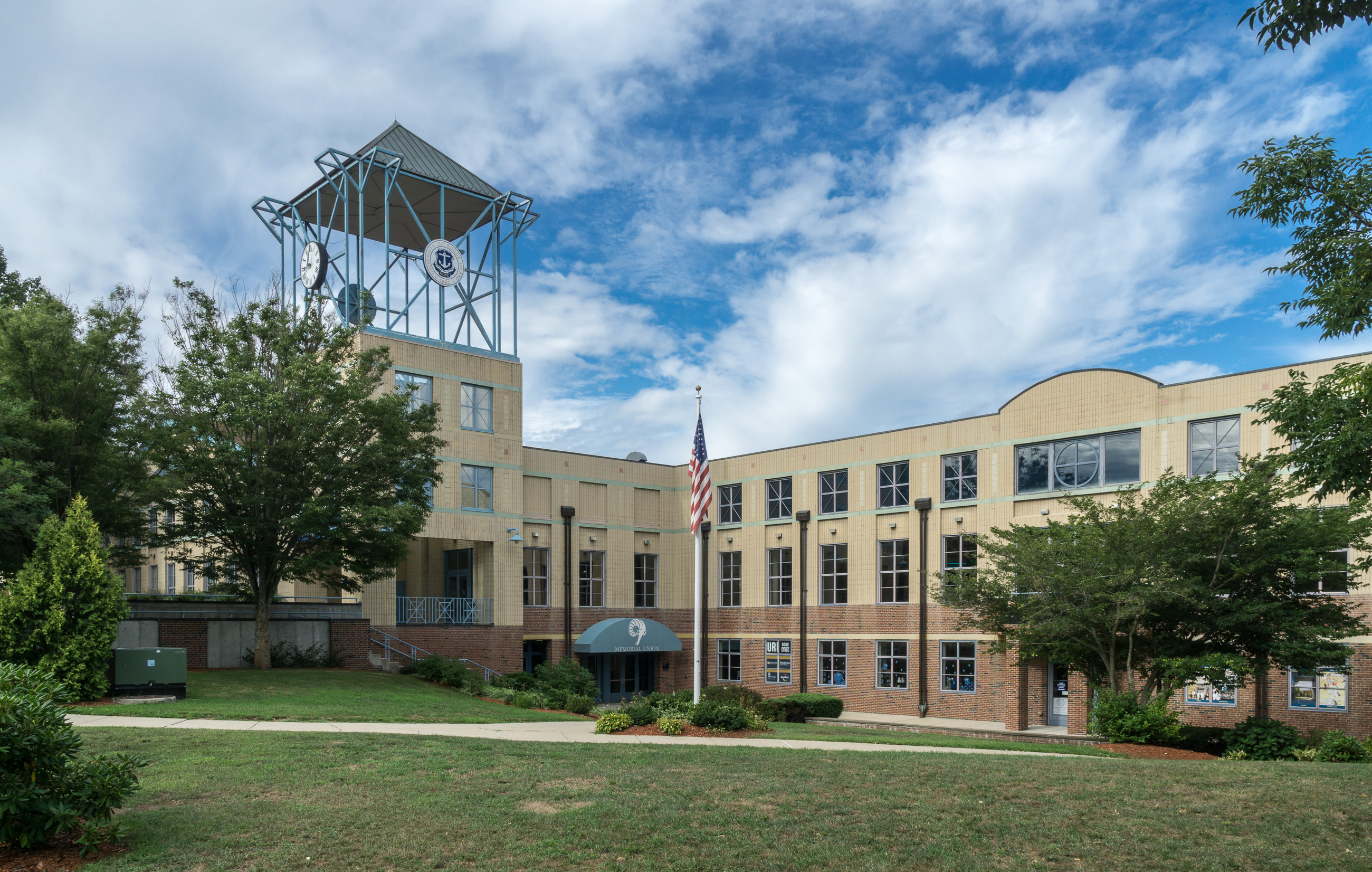
Memorial Student Union

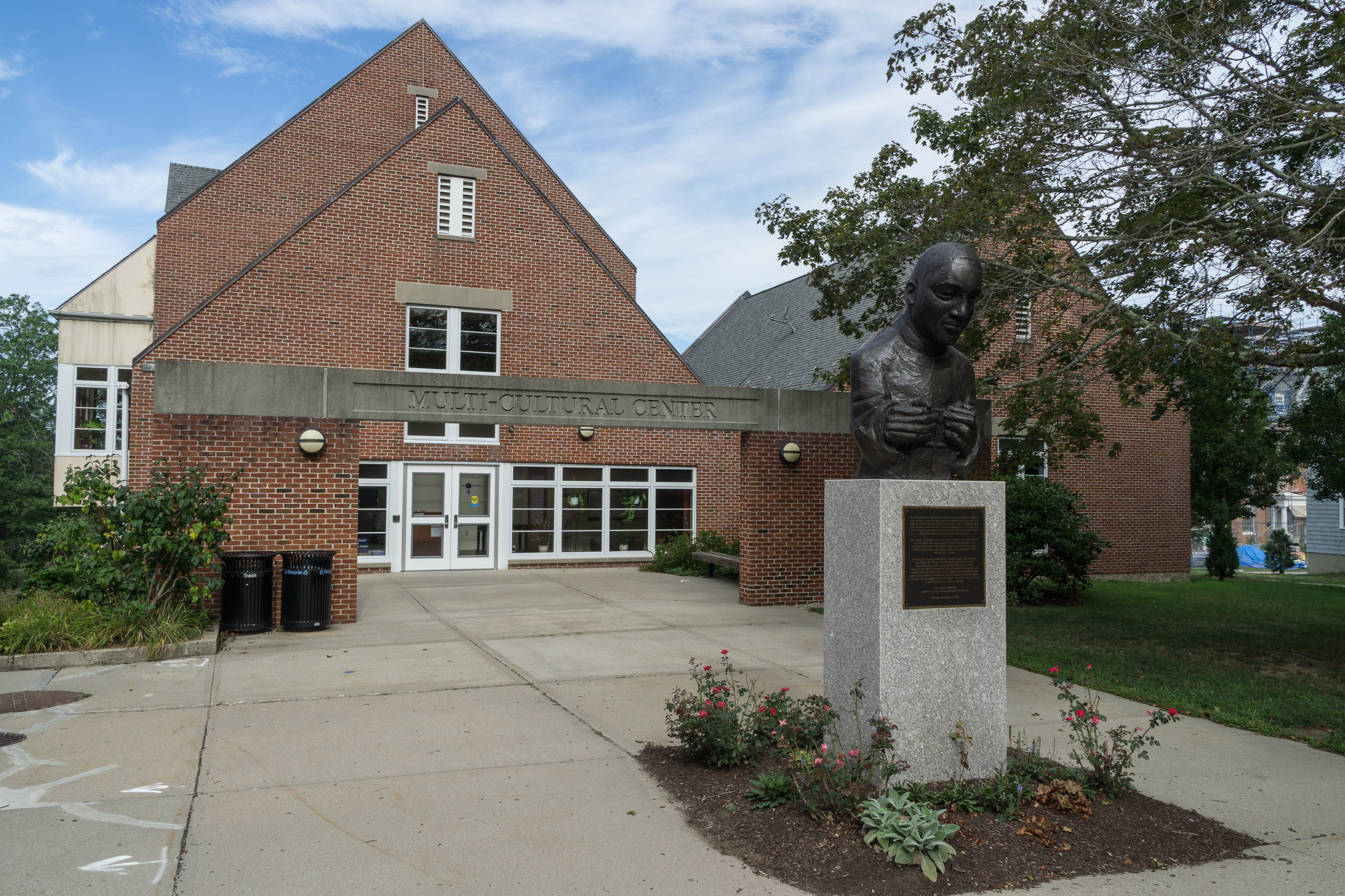
Multicultural Center (1998)

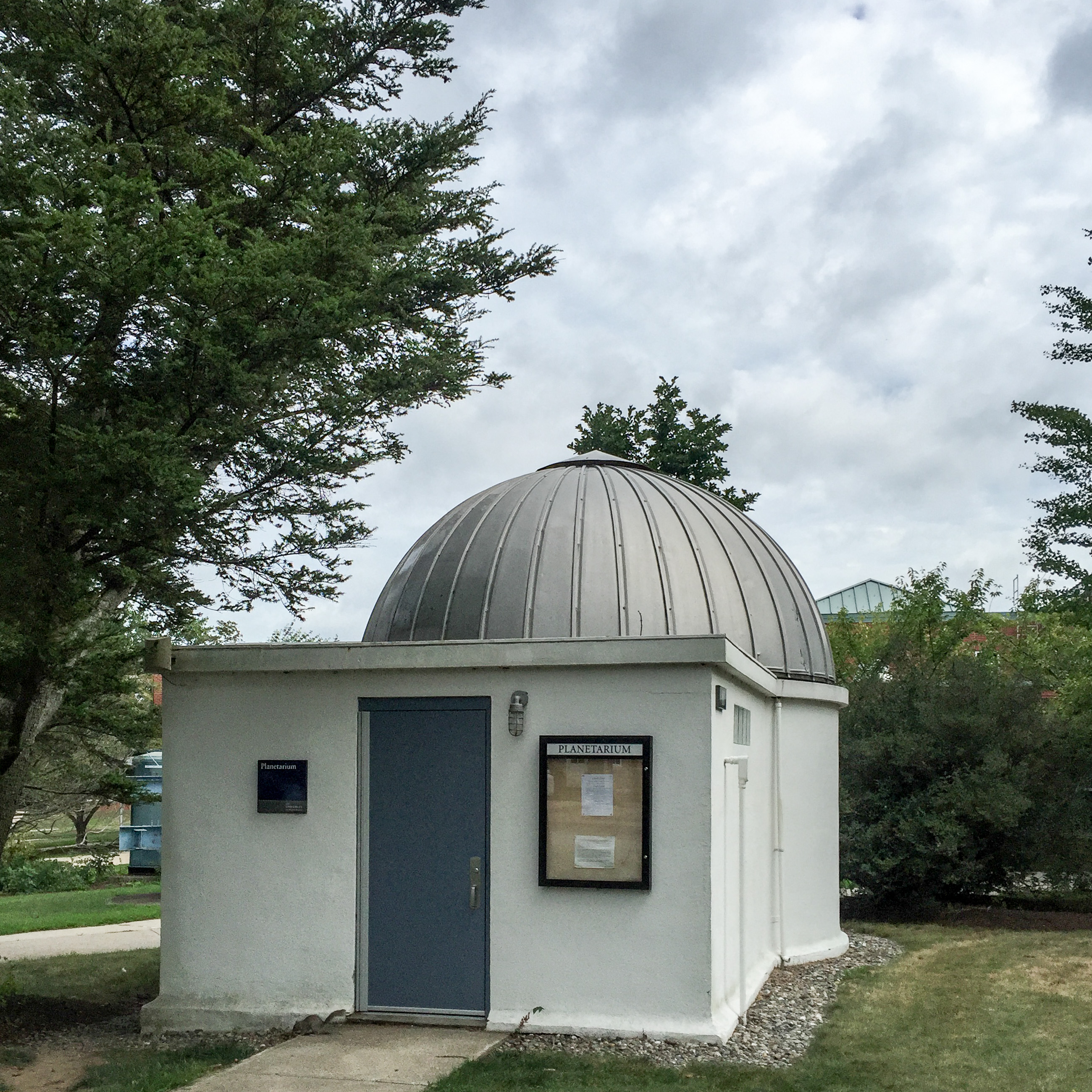
Planetarium

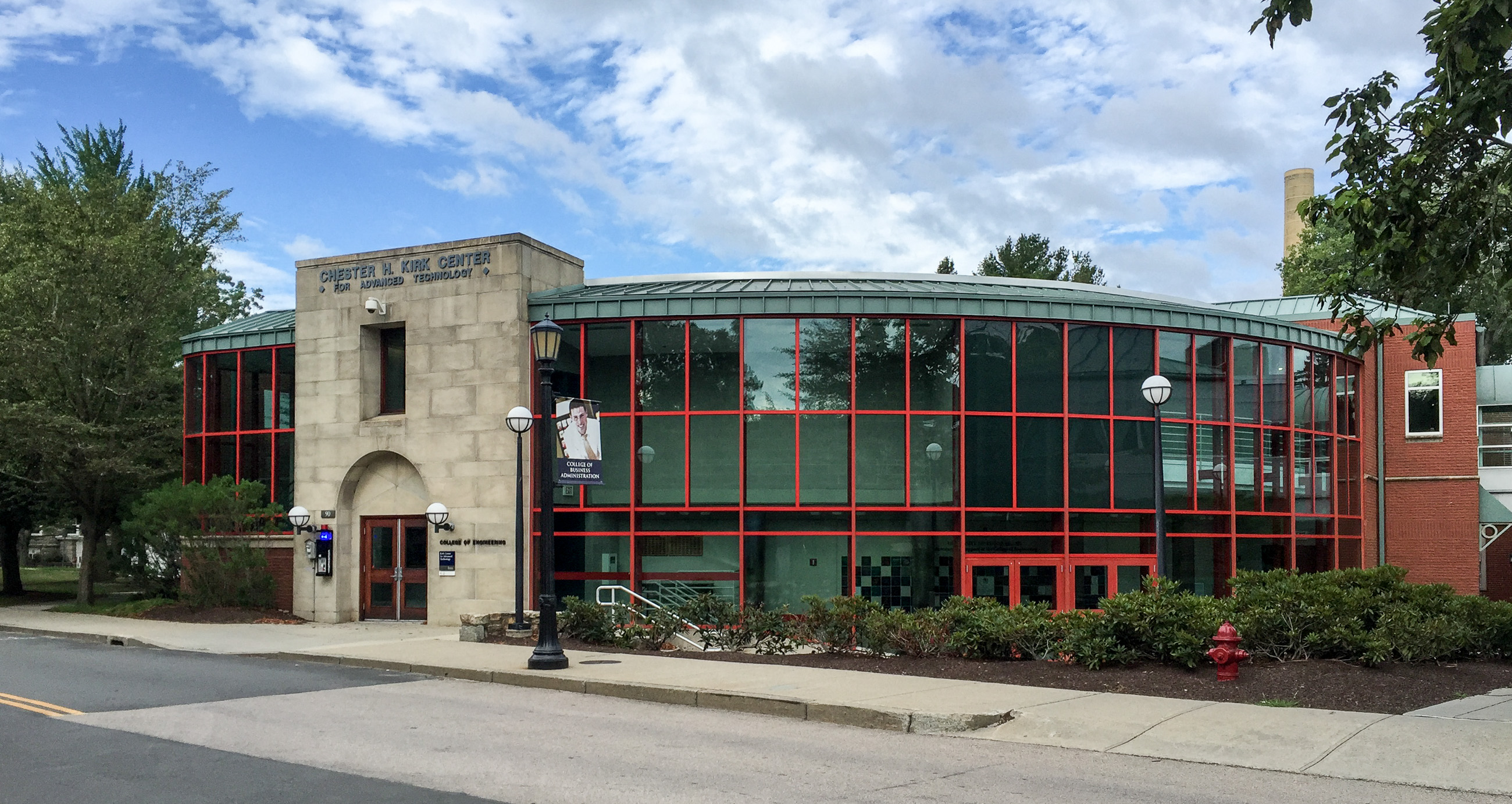
The Chester H. Kirk Center for Advanced Technology (1995)

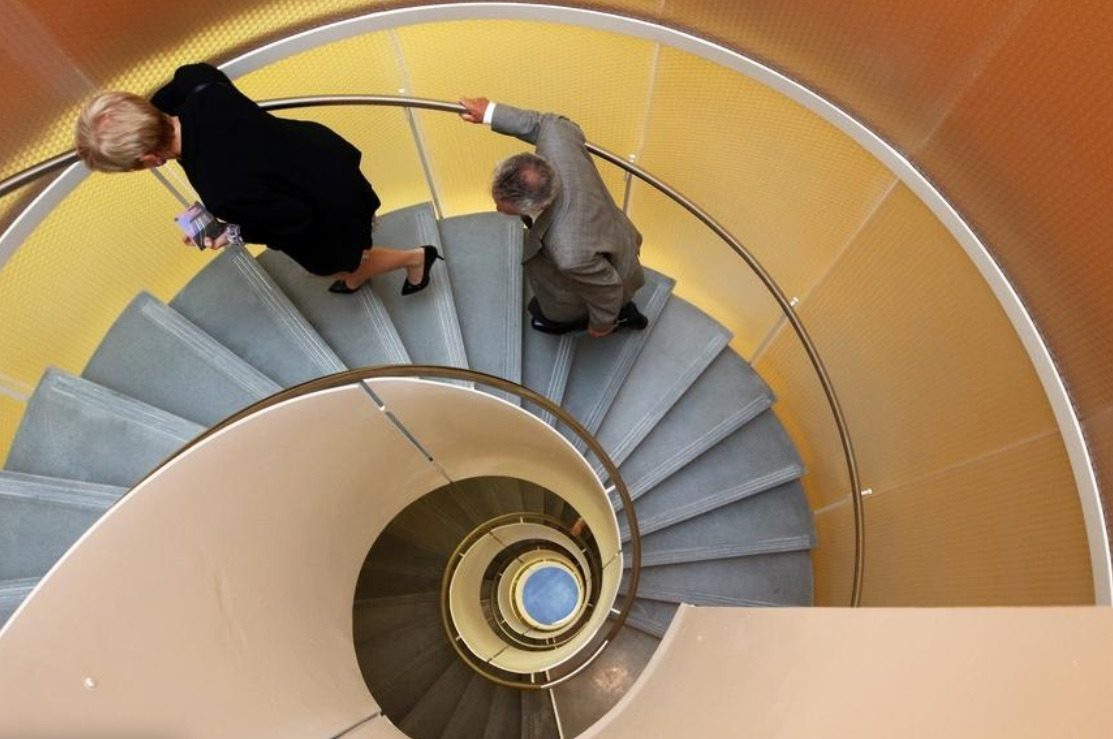
New URI Engineering Stairway to Excellence (2019)

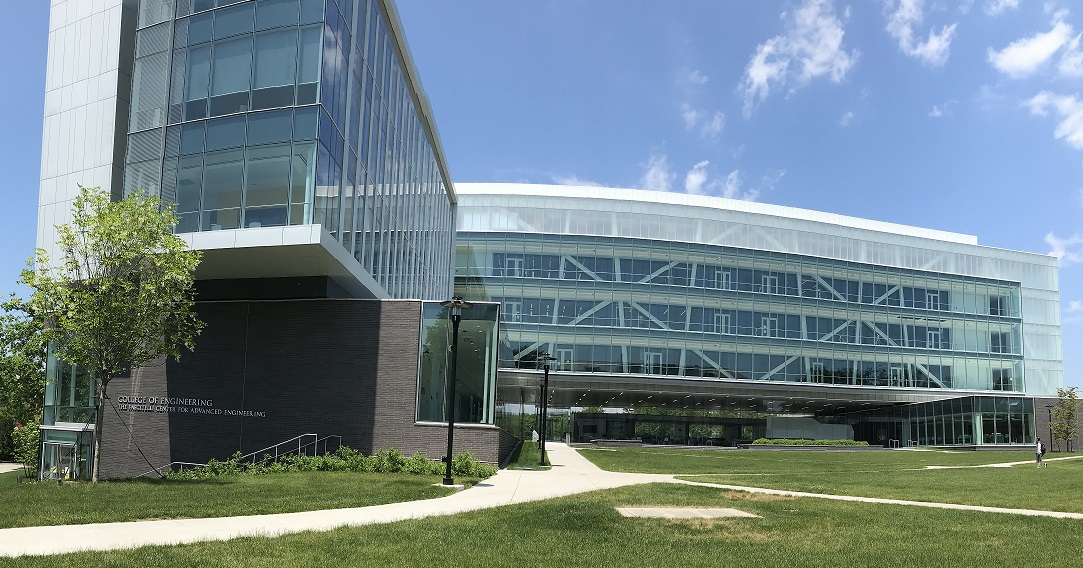
New URI Engineering Building (2021)

== Satellite Campuses ==
=== W. Alton Jones Campus ===
The W. Alton Jones Campus is one of three satellite campuses of the University of Rhode Island and is located in West Greenwich, Rhode Island. At 2309-acres (9.34 km^{2}) it is the largest satellite campus of the University of Rhode Island and consists of an Environmental Education Center, a business conference center, a working farm and the Nettie Marie Jones Nature Preserve.

The land was donated to the University of Rhode Island by Nettie Marie Jones, widow of businessman W. Alton Jones. The addition of the property tripled the size of the University's landholdings and gave it the unique position of possessing more land than any of the other New England state universities.

The property is a part of the coastal forest and wildlife corridor that spans from Washington, D.C., to Maine. The property also is a link between the 2,200-acre (8.90 km^{2}) Tillinghast Pond Management Area in West Greenwich and the 14,000-acre (56.66 km^{2}) Arcadia Management Area in West Greenwich and three other towns.

The campus closed in June, 2020 and an online petition urging former URI president Dr. David M. Dooley and former governor Gina Raimondo to reopen the camp and education programs has collected more than 6,900 signatures.

==== History ====
In 1954 W. Alton Jones, president of CITGO, bought the property for hunting and fishing vacations. He was a close friend of United States President Dwight D. Eisenhower, who visited the property four times for fishing, hunting and skeet shooting. On March 1, 1962, W. Alton Jones died in a plane crash while on his way to Los Angeles to meet Eisenhower for a fishing trip. His widow, Nettie Marie Jones, donated the property to the University of Rhode Island and included everything that remained on the property, from the buildings, to the farm animals and equipment - was included in the gift.

==== Environmental Education Center ====
In 1965 a Youth Science Center (now called the Environmental Education Center or EEC) was constructed with much of the funding provided by the W. Alton Jones Foundation. Governor John Chafee celebrated the opening of the Environmental Education Center at a dedication ceremony with a speech. 50 years later, his son Governor Lincoln Chafee celebrated the 50th anniversary of the W. Alton Jones campus at a rededication ceremony also with a speech.

The Environmental Education Center hosted an average of 1900 campers each summer and 70 different school groups from the New England region during the academic school year.

==== Whispering Pines Conference Center ====
The Whispering Pines Conference Center hosted conferences, retreats and team-building programs. It consisted of 32 guest rooms and four conference rooms.

The center’s client list ranged from small businesses, to teachers’ unions and big banks.

==== Pop Culture ====
In 2005 the W. Alton Jones campus was the base of the movie Hard Luck, featuring Wesley Snipes, Cybill Shepard, and Mario Van Peebles. The movie intertwines stories involving a drug dealer trying to go straight, and a housewife trying to hide a sadistic secret.

==== Closing ====
In June of 2020 the University of Rhode Island closed the Environmental Education Center and Whispering Pines Conference Center, citing financial hardships dating back several years.

== Academics ==
Academic rankings

National
- Forbes: 315
- U.S. News & World Report: 148
- Washington Monthly: 174
- WSJ/College Pulse: 76

Global
- THE: 601–800
- U.S. News & World Report: 749

URI is accredited by the New England Commission of Higher Education. The student-faculty ratio at University of Rhode Island is 16:1, and the school has 43.1% of its classes with fewer than 20 students. The most popular majors at University of Rhode Island include: Registered Nursing/Registered Nurse; Psychology, General; Speech Communication and Rhetoric; Kinesiology and Exercise Science; and Health-Related Knowledge and Skills, Other. The average freshman retention rate, an indicator of student satisfaction, is 84%.

=== Rankings ===
U.S. News & World Report ranks URI tied for 152nd overall among 436 "national universities" and tied for 81st out of 225 "top public schools" in 2024.

- 31st in ''Pharmacy (tie)" in 2024
- 47th in "Best Library and Information Studies Program (tie)" in 2024
- 48th in ''Best Nursing School: Master's (tie)'' in 2024
- 70th in ''Earth Sciences (tie)'' in 2024
- 66th in ''Best Nursing School: Doctor of Nursing Practice (tie)'' in 2024
- 101st in ''Clinical Psychology (tie)'' in 2024
- 106th in "Physical Therapy (tie)" in 2024
- 108th in "English (tie)" in 2024
- 78th in "Speech-Language Pathology (tie)" in 2024
- 148th in ''Computer Sciences (tie)'' in 2024
- 130th in "Best Education Schools (tie)" in 2024
- 150th in "Chemistry (tie)" in 2024
- 144th in "Mathematics (tie)" in 2024
- 111th in "Psychology (tie)" in 2024
- 139th in ''Best Undergraduate Engineering Program'' in 2024.
- 144th in ''Biological Sciences (tie)'' in 2024
- 152nd in "Physics (tie)" in 2024
- 135th in "Best Engineering Schools" in 2024

Academic Ranking of World Universities ranks URI for 51-75 globally for ''Oceanography'' in 2023.

=== Admissions ===
The average incoming freshman at the Kingston campus for 2025 had a GPA of 3.76 and an equivalent SAT score of 1265 (on a 1600 scale, with ACT scores converted accordingly).

== Student clubs ==
Undergraduate demographics as of Fall 2023
Race and ethnicity	Total
White	74%
Hispanic	11%
Black	5%
Two or more races	4%
Asian	3%
Unknown	2%
International student	1%
Economic diversity
Low-income (Note: The percentage of students who received an income-based federal Pell grant intended for low-income students.)	23%
Affluent (Note: The percentage of students who are a part of the American middle class at the bare minimum.)	77%

URI has 21 club sports teams, including crew, equestrian, field hockey, gymnastics, ice hockey, lacrosse, pickleball, badminton, rugby, sailing, soccer, swimming & diving, tennis, ultimate, volleyball, and wrestling. These teams travel and compete against other intercollegiate programs in the country. URI also has 20+ intramural sports, including volleyball, badminton, dodgeball, and soccer. The intramural sports allow students to compete in tournaments and games with other students on campus.

URI also has over 300 student organizations and clubs. The university's student newspaper, The Good Five Cent Cigar, was founded in 1971. It is also home to several Greek-lettered organizations.

== Athletics ==
URI Athletics Logo

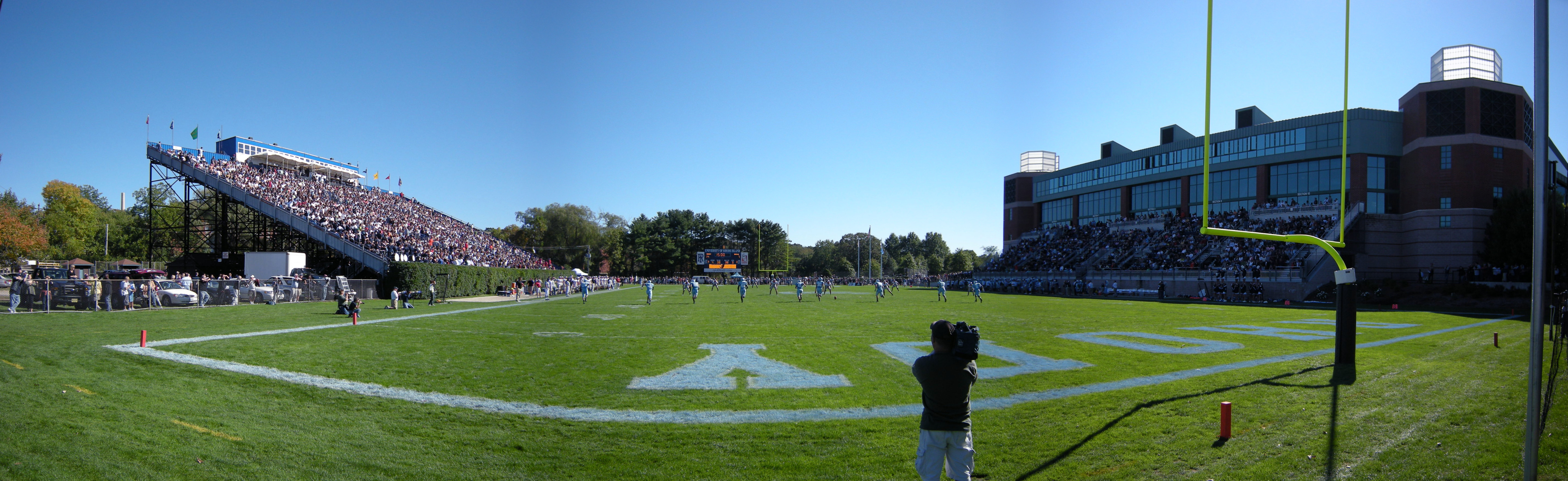
University of Rhode Island Rams Football at Meade Stadium

The University of Rhode Island competes in 16 intercollegiate sports. The university is a member of the Atlantic 10 Conference and the Coastal Athletic Association in the NCAA Division I Football Championship Subdivision.

The Rhode Island Rams men's basketball competes in the Atlantic 10 Conference, and has appeared in the NCAA "March Madness" Tournament a total of 10 times since its first appearance in 1961. Two of these ten appearances occurred during the 2017 and 2018 seasons.

Athletic facilities include the Ryan Center, Keaney Gymnasium, Meade Stadium, Mackal Field House, Tootell Aquatic Center, Bradford R. Boss Arena, URI Soccer Complex, Bill Beck Field, and URI Softball Complex.

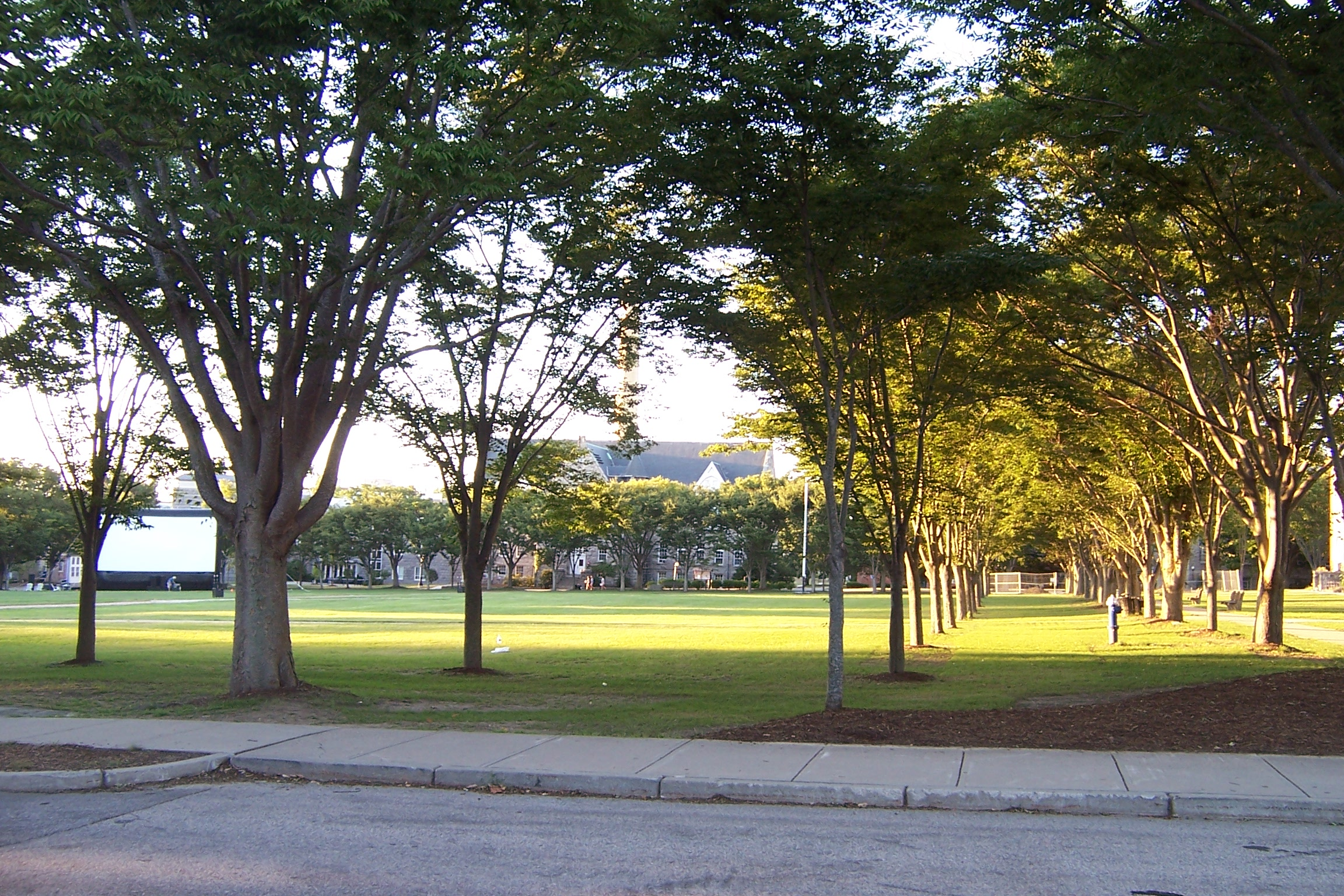
Quadrangle on an early September evening at University of Rhode Island.

== Off campus living ==
While 5600 students live in the 25 on-campus residence halls, thousands more opt to commute from the surrounding area. Narragansett, an abutting town to Kingston, is made up of hundreds of summer vacation homes which are rented to students for the academic year.

== Notable alumni ==
Notable University of Rhode Island alumni in politics and government include Lieutenant General (retired) Michael Flynn (B.Sc. 1981), 38th mayor of Providence Jorge Elorza (B.Sc. 1998), and governors of Rhode Island Lincoln Almond (B.Sc. 1959) and J. Joseph Garrahy (1953).

Notable graduates in journalism and media include CNN correspondent John King (B.A. 1985), CNN anchor Christiane Amanpour (B.A. 1983), and CBS correspondent Vladimir Duthiers (B.A. 1991).

Among URI's alumni in the arts and entertainment are actors J. T. Walsh, Peter Frechette (B.F.A.), Amanda Clayton, and Andrew Burnap (recipient of the 2020 Tony Award- Best Actor in a Play, The Inheritance.)

Notable graduates in business and finance include CEO and Founder of Beemok Capital, Ben Navarro (B.Sc. 1984); former president of American Airlines, Robert Crandall (1960); and former CEO of CVS, Thomas Ryan (1975).

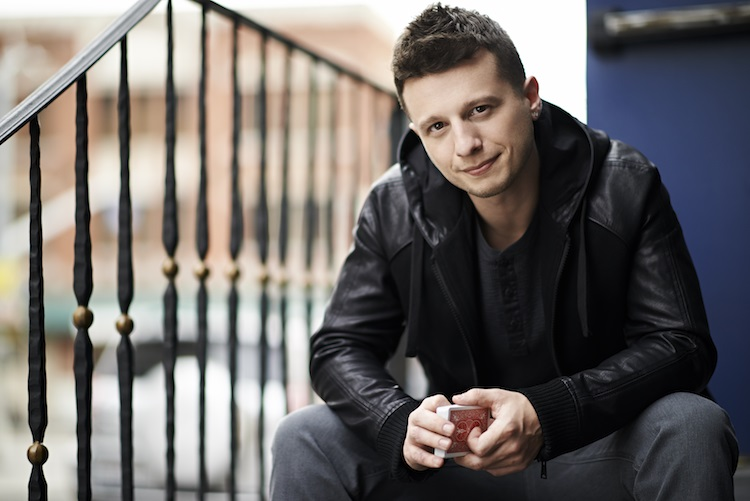
America's Got Talent winner Mat Franco '10

First magician to win America's Got Talent Mat Franco (2010).

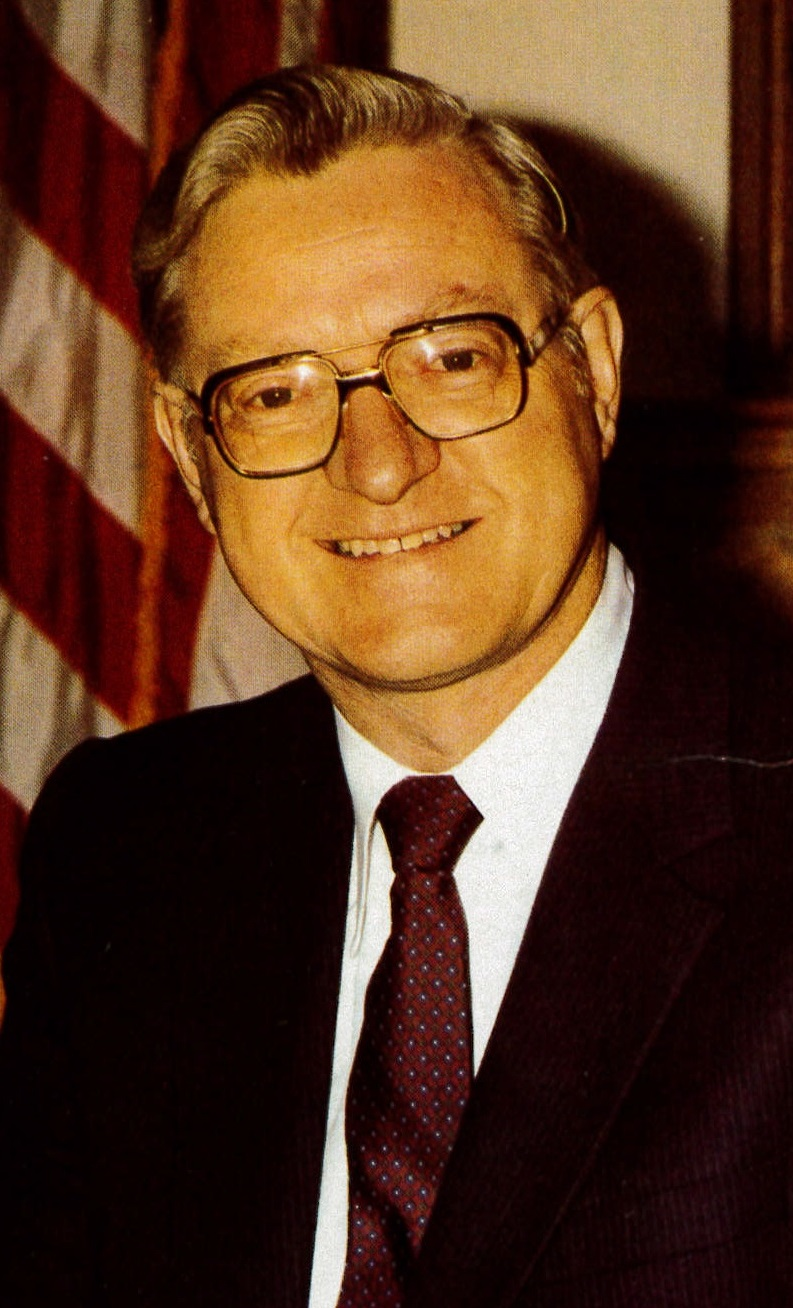
Governor of Rhode Island J. Joseph Garrahy '59

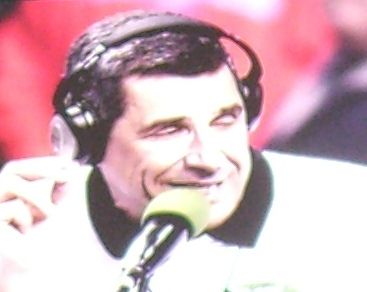
Sports radio personality Angelo Cataldi '72

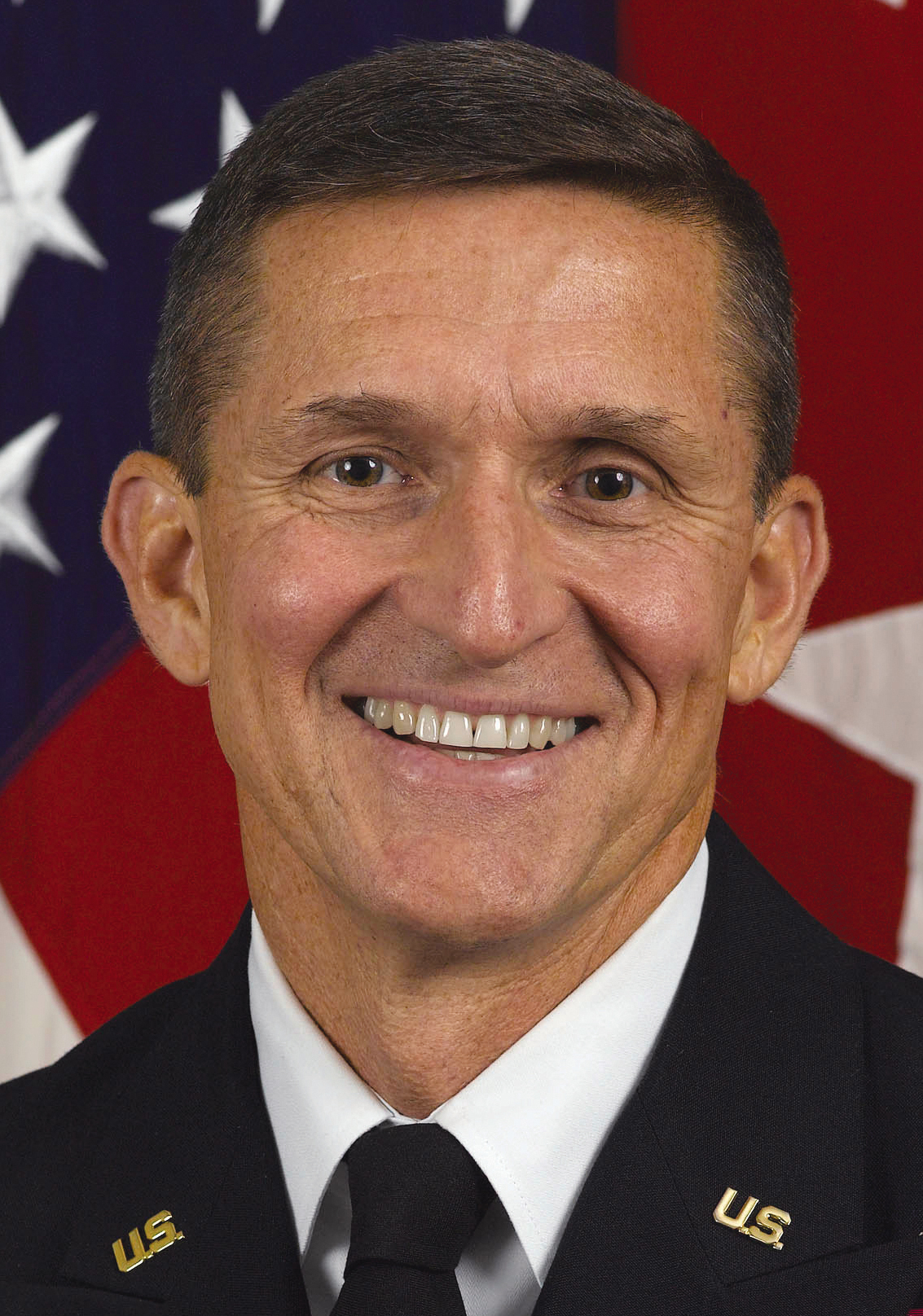
25th U.S. national security advisor Michael Flynn '81

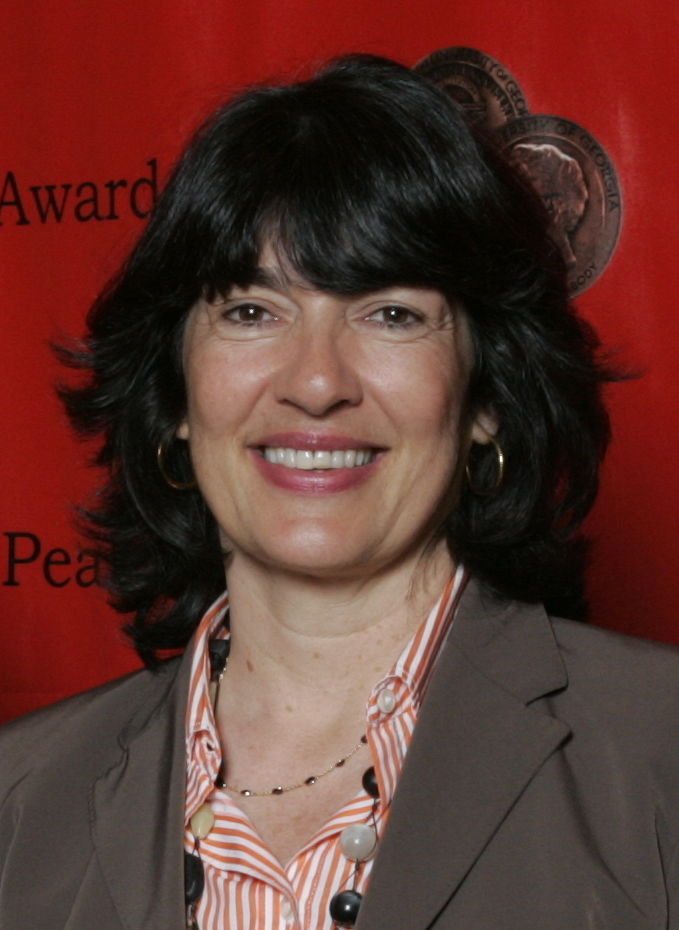
CNN anchor Christiane Amanpour '83

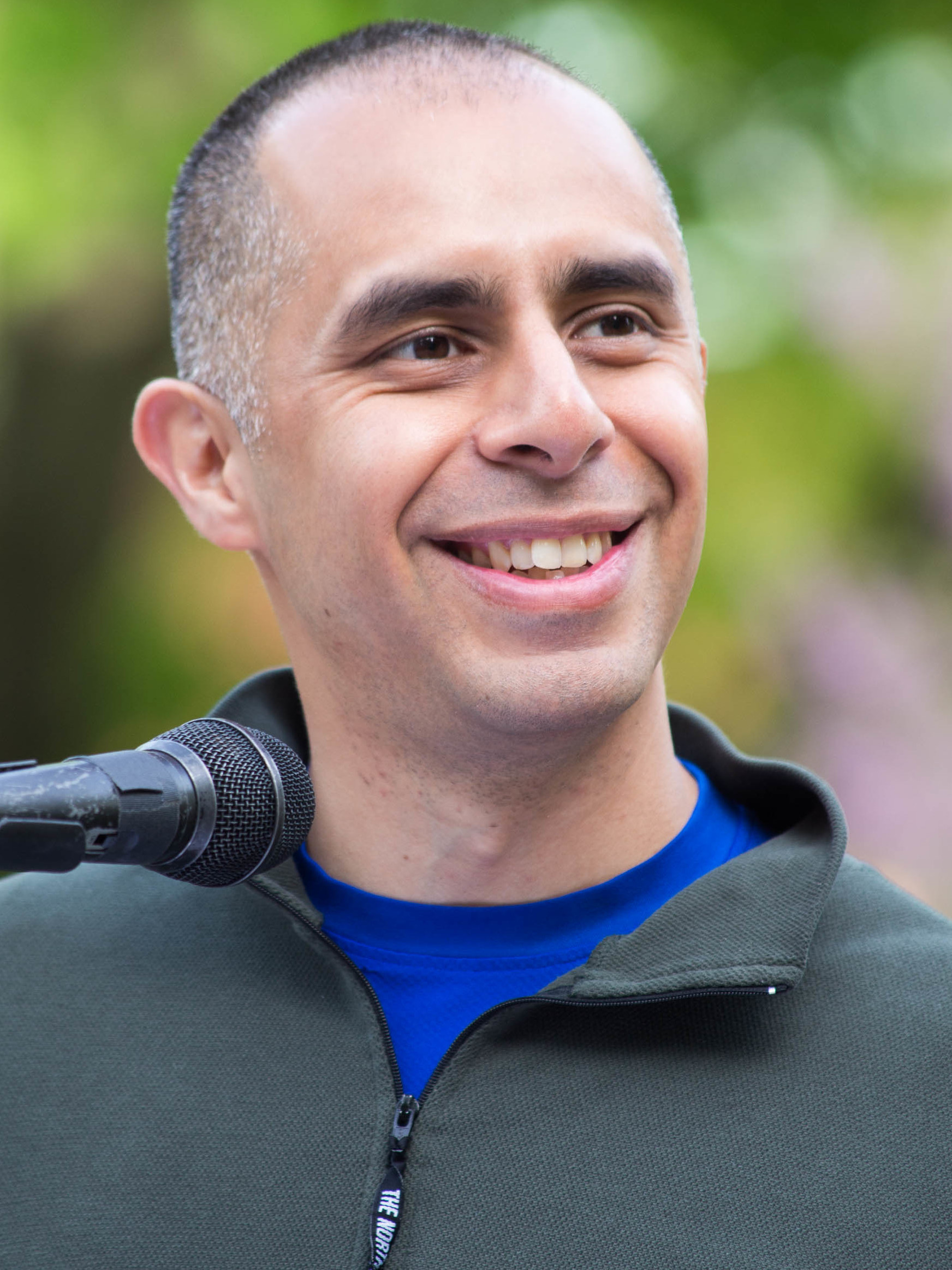
38th mayor of Providence Jorge Elorza '98

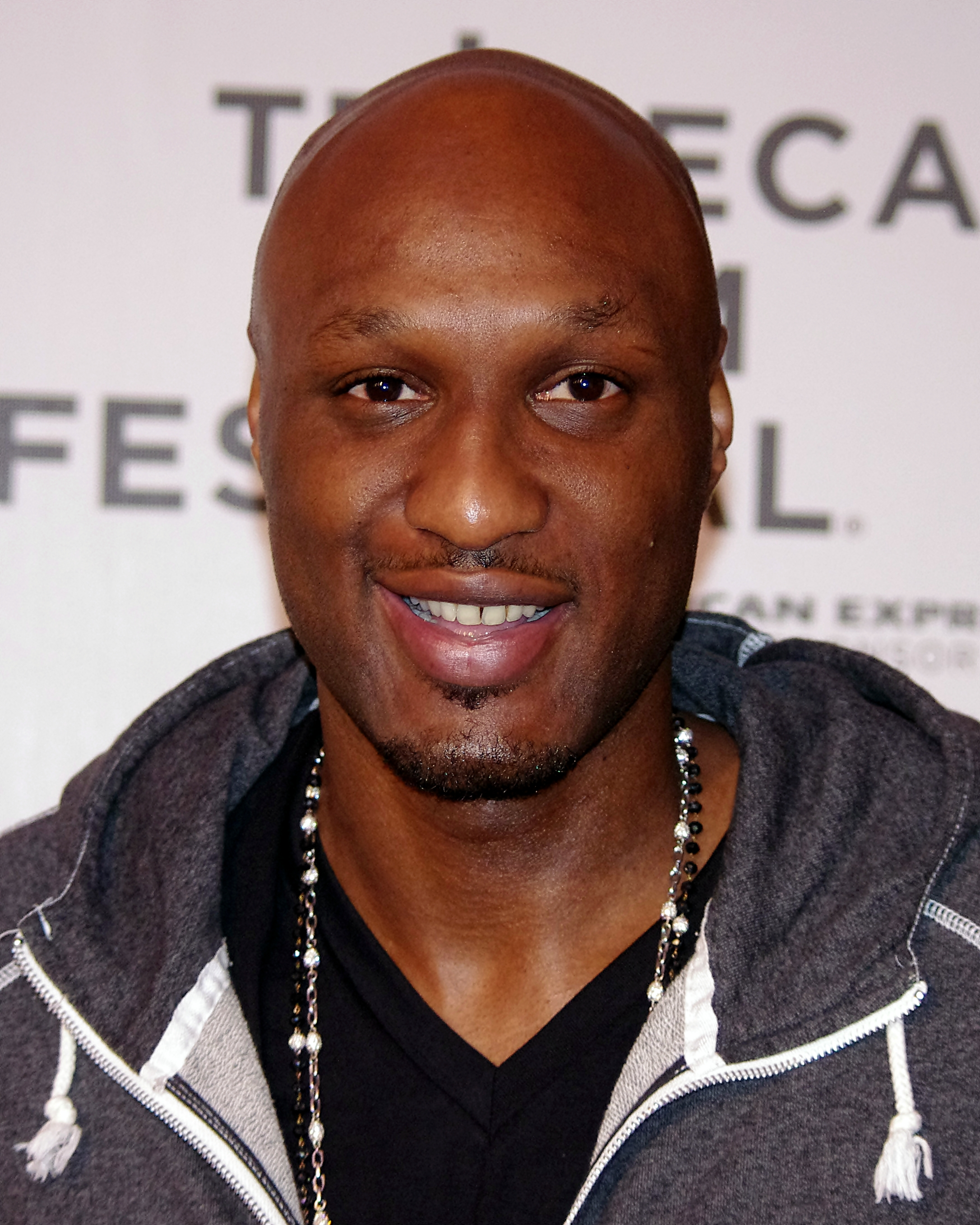
Basketball star Lamar Odom
(did not graduate)

== Notable faculty ==
- Robert Ballard, undersea archaeologist and discoverer of the wreck of the Titanic
- Yehuda Hayuth, Israeli professor of geography, and President of the University of Haifa
- Natalie Kampen
- Joëlle Rollo-Koster
- Andrea Rusnock
- Dana Shugar, first department head of Women´s studies major
- Melvin Stern
- Robert Weisbord
- Robert E. Will

== See also ==
- URI Botanical Gardens
- Joint Degrees in law at Roger Williams University School of Law
