= Financial liberalisation =

Financial Liberalisation is a term describing a series of policies that aim to remove other policies that are seen to constrain the effects of free markets in the area of finance most often in developing economies. The main types of policies discussed under this label typically involve reforming the domestic financial sector (often privatization and expansion in credit for the private sector) ; the liberalisation of stock markets (typically opening up to foreign investors); allowing domestic firms to more free access international financial markets; and the liberalisation of the capital account (typically with the relaxation of exchange controls on capital account transactions); a lowering of reserve requirements.
