= List of presidents of the University of Rhode Island =

The following is a list of presidents of the University of Rhode Island.

No.	Image	President	Term start	Term end	Ref.
Presidents of Rhode Island College of Agriculture and the Mechanic Arts (1892–1909)
1		John Hosea Washburn (Note: From 1888 to 1892, Washburn served as founding principal of the Rhode Island State Agricultural School associated with the Agricultural Experiment Station.)	1892	1902	
acting		Homer Jay Wheeler (Note: Agricultural Experiment Station Director)	1902	1903	
2		Kenyon L. Butterfield	1903	1906	
Presidents of Rhode Island State College (1909–1951)
3		Howard Edwards	1906	1930	
acting		John Barlow	1930	1931	
4		Raymond G. Bressler, Sr.	1931	1940	
acting		John Barlow	1940	1941	
Presidents of University of Rhode Island (1951–present)
5		Carl R. Woodward	1941	1958	
6		Francis H. Horn	1958	1967	
acting		F. Donald James	1967	1968	
7		Werner A. Baum	1968	1973	
acting		William R. Ferrante (Note: Provost and Vice President of Academic affairs 1972-1988)	1974	1974	
8		Frank J. Newman	1974	1983	
acting		William R. Ferrante	1983	1983	
9		Edward D. Eddy	1983	1991	
10		Robert L. Carothers	1991	June 30, 2009	
11		David M. Dooley	July 1, 2009	July 31, 2021	
12		Marc Parlange	August 1, 2021	present	

Table notes:
