= Campus Compact =

Coalition of college and university presidents

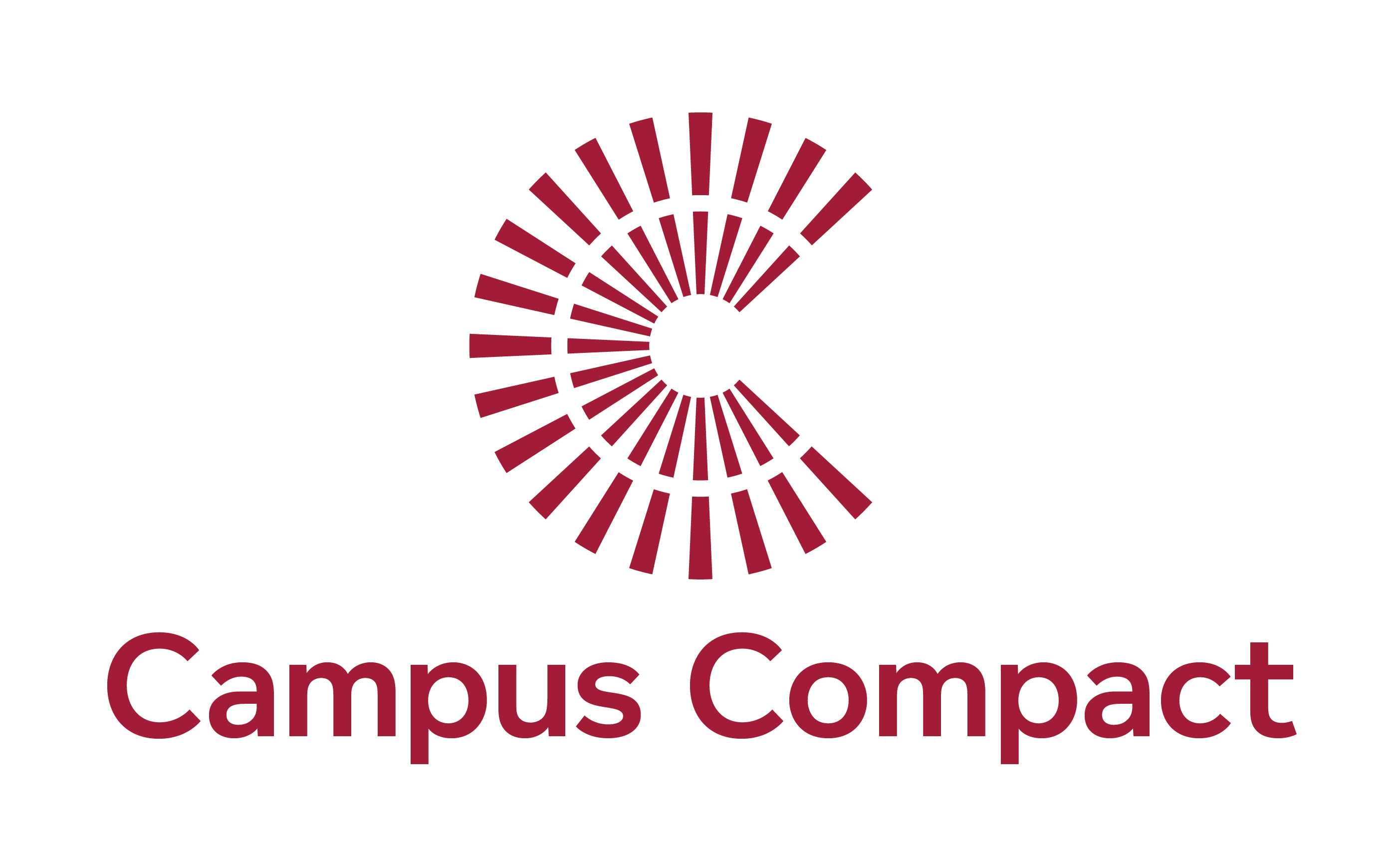
- Formation: 1985
- Type: Non-Profit
- Purpose: Higher Education, Service-Learning, Civic engagement
- Headquarters: Boston, Massachusetts
- Region served: United States
- President: Bobbie Laur
- Website: compact.org

Campus Compact is a coalition of colleges and universities committed to fulfilling the public purposes of higher education.

The non-profit comprises a national office located in Boston, MA as well as state and regional compact offices to support the work of member colleges. Campus Compact has members mostly throughout the United States, but also has members in many US Territories and countries outside of the US as well.

== History ==
The Compact was co-founded in 1985 by Howard Swearer, Timothy S. Healy, and Donald Kennedy, the presidents of Brown, Georgetown and Stanford universities, and Frank Newman, the former president of the Education Commission of the States.

Initially, the work of the Compact focused on engaging students in community service. Media coverage at the time portrayed college-age students as part of a 'me generation', more interested in increasing their wealth and status than serving their community. The founding presidents aimed to counteract this prevailing image, by showcasing the good work college students were already and providing support and encouragement for others to participate.

In 1988, the first two state Compact affiliates were formed to provide greater support to campuses and build regional and local networks.

In 1991, membership had reached 500 colleges and universities. By this time, national attention had turned to the connection between participation in community service and academic achievement. Campus Compact launched the Integrating Service with Academic Study (ISAS) initiative, which funded grants and workshops to support colleges interested in building service-learning into their institutions.

By 2000, service-learning had become an increasingly important educational movement. Campus Compact began a series of publications that documented the effects of service learning and provided resources to help faculty and departments build their own programs and curricula.

In 2002, Campus Compact launched the Raise Your Voice campaign, the Compact's first national effort to work with students themselves. Over the two years of the campaign, the participation of more than 250,000 students was documented.

In 2005, the 20th year of its existence, Campus Compact had grown to 32 state affiliates and more than 1000 member campuses.

Over time, the Compact has grown from a presidents' organization to one that supports the work of a variety of constituencies - college presidents, faculty, staff, students and community partners.

In 2009, Campus Compact moved its national office from the campus of Brown University in Providence, Rhode Island to the Downtown Crossing district of Boston, Massachusetts. They currently have an office space at the Non-Profit Center.

In 2016, Campus Compact celebrated their 30th anniversary and circulated an Action Statement. This commitment of more than 400 college and university presidents expressed shared goals and enhanced action throughout the network regarding the public purpose of higher education.

In March 2020, Campus Compact's biennial national conference was cancelled due to the continuing spread of COVID-19. Despite the cancelation, Campus Compact offered the Compact20 Virtual Gathering from May 11, 2020 - May 13, 2020, a free virtual conference that provided opportunities for learning, networking, and pursuing ongoing commitments.

In July 2020, Due to multiple institutions rapidly changed from in-person to online learning. The Fusion Course created by Campus Compact aimed to provide critical training and support for faculty as they adapt to online teaching. It also offered instruction on integrating community engagement methodologies into existing curricula to improve the quality of course delivery and foster student engagement. Through this faculty development course, individuals learned how to infuse community-based learning into online classes to give students hands-on experiences that will strengthen understanding, create connections to the larger community, and improve student retention rates.

In January 2022, Campus Compact's Board of Directors announced that Bobbie Laur had been appointed the organization's next president, effective February 15, 2022. Laur previously served as associate vice president for outreach at Towson University and simultaneously served as executive director of the Coalition of Urban and Metropolitan Universities (CUMU).

In March 2022, Campus Compact, a national coalition of colleges and universities working to advance the public purposes of higher education, has named 173 student civic leaders from 38 states to the 2022 cohort of Newman Civic Fellows.

In 2022, one of the constituent bodies (Campus Compact Midatlantic - previously the Maryland-District of Columbia Campus Compact left Campus Compact and now operates independently as Transform Midatlantic.

== Further information ==
- National Campus Compact website
- https://www.bemidjistate.edu/community/engagement/what-is-campus-compact/
- http://mainecompact.org/
- https://www.youtube.com/channel/UCQiy6Yotj6pdC6ekOTrD0Qw
