= Homer Jay Wheeler =

American scientist and professor

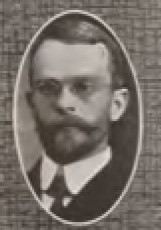
- Homer Jay Wheeler (1861-1945). Yearbook photo from the Rhode Island State College "Grist" Yearbook of 1904.
- Born: December 2, 1861; Bolton, Massachusetts, US
- Died: November 18, 1945 (aged 83); Montclair, New Jersey, US
- Education: Massachusetts Agricultural College(BS), University of Göttingen (PhD)
- Known for: Extraction of xylose from wood; Pioneer in science of agricultural fertilizers
- Spouse: Frieda Hedwig Franziska Ruprecht (m. 15 May 1891)
- Children: 3
- Scientific career
- Fields: Agricultural chemistry, Geology
- Workplaces: Massachusetts Agricultural College; Rhode Island College of Agriculture and Mechanic Arts; Agricultural Service Bureau of the American Agricultural Chemical Company
- Thesis: Untersuchungen uber die Xylose oder den Holzzucker, die Pentaglycose aus Buchen- und Tannenholzgummi sowie aus Jute: Universität Göttingen (1889)
- Doctoral advisor: Bernhard Tollens

Homer Jay Wheeler (September 2, 1861 – November 18, 1945) was an American agricultural chemist and college administrator. He was the director of the Rhode Island Agricultural Experiment Station at the Rhode Island State College and was interim president of the college between 1902 and 1903. After 1912 until his retirement he was employed by Agricultural Service Bureau of the American Agricultural Chemical Company in Boston and New York City.

== Early life and education ==
Homer Wheeler was born in Bolton, Massachusetts, on September 2, 1861, to Quakers Jesse Brown Wheeler and Martha Aann (Sykes) Wheeler. He studied agriculture at Massachusetts Agricultural College, earning a B.S. degree in 1883, after which he worked for four years as assistant to the Dr. Goessmann, the director of the newly established Massachusetts Agricultural Experiment Station. In 1887 with his colleague John Hosea Washburn traveled to Germany for graduate studies at University of Göttingen. He earned both his M.A. and Ph.D. in 1889, with his dissertation focusing on the isolation and characterization of xylose in wood. He returned to the United States and became chief chemist of the newly established Rhode Island Agricultural Experiment Station at Kingston, Rhode Island. On 15 May 1891 he was married in Brooklyn, New York, to Frieda H. F. Ruprecht of Göttingen, Germany.

== Professional career ==
Not long after Wheeler's arrival at the agricultural experiment station, he was offered the directorship, and the position of professor of geology and agrononmy at Rhode Island College of Agriculture and Mechanic Arts (later to become Rhode Island State College), concurrent with his experiment station work from 1894 to 1912. From 1902 to 1903 served as acting president of the college upon the departure of John Hosea Washburn. While at the college, he served as president of the Association of Official Agricultural Chemists of the United States, as president of the American Society of Agronomy, and as chairman of the New England Section of the American Chemical Society. In 1912, Wheeler resigned to become manager of the Agricultural Service Bureau of the American Agricultural Chemical Company in Boston, Massachusetts. During World War I he served as chairman of the Committee on Soils and Fertilizers of the National Research Council.

Wheeler maintained his activity in retirement as a practicing scientist until just prior to his death in 1945. He died at his home in Montclair, New Jersey on November 18, 1945.

== Selected publications ==
- Wheeler, H.J. and Tollens, B. (1889). V. Ueber die Xylose oder den Holzzucker, eine zweite Penta‐Glycose. Justus Liebigs Annalen der Chemie, 254(3):304-320.
- Wheeler, H. J., & Tollens, B. (1889). Ueber die Xylose (Holzzucker) und das Holzgummi. Berichte der Deutschen Chemischen Gesellschaft 22(1):1046-1046.
- Wheeler, H.J. (1897). On the use of flowers of sulfur and sulfate of ammonia as preventive of the potato scab in contaminated soils. Rhode Island Experiment Station Annual Report 10:254-268.
- Wheeler, H.J. (1899). Quantities of Nitrogen for Grass (Vol. 57). Agricultural Experiment Station of the Rhode Island College of Agriculture and Mechanic Arts.
- Wheeler, H.J., Hartwell, B.L. and Sargent, C.L. (1900). Chemical methods for ascertaining the lime requirement of soils. Journal of the American Chemical Society 22(3):153-177.
- Wheeler, H.J. (1900). A Four-year Rotation of Crops: Indian Corn, Potatoes, Rye, Clover (Vol. 75). Agricultural Experiment Station of the Rhode Island College of Agriculture and Mechanic Arts.
- Wheeler, H.J. (1904). A Six-year Rotation of Crops (Vol. 99). Agricultural Experiment Station of the Rhode Island College of Agriculture and Mechanic Arts.
- Wheeler, H.J. (1909). The future of agricultural chemistry. Science 29(747):647-653.
- Wheeler, H.J. (1910). A Pheasant-Bantam Hybrid. Journal of Heredity 1(4):266-268.
- Wheeler, H.J. (1913). Manures and Fertilizers: A Text-book for College Students and a Work of Reference for All Interested in the Scientific Aspects of Modern Farming. New York: Macmillan.
- Wheeler, H.J. (1918). The fertilizer needs of the United States. The Quarterly Journal of Economics 32(2):209-237.
- Wheeler, H.J. (1919). Problems and Methods in Agricultural Research. Industrial & Engineering Chemistry 11(11):1056-1060.
- Wheeler, H.J. (1924). How to Select and Apply Fertilizer. American Agricultural Chemical Company.
