= John Barlow (entomologist) =

American dean of University of Rhode Island

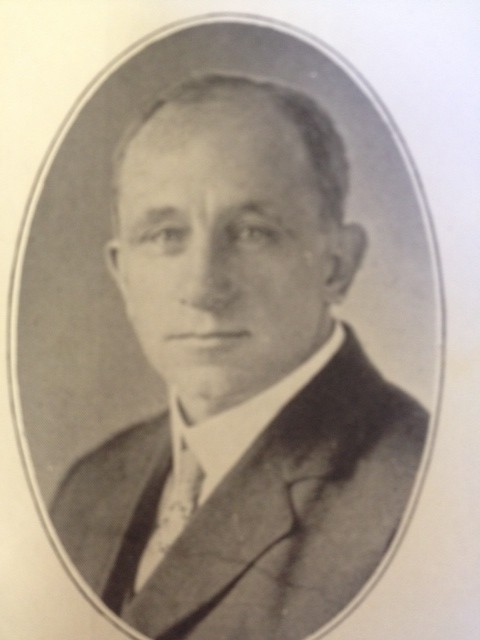
- John Barlow (1872-1944). Yearbook photo from the Rhode Island State College "Grist" Yearbook of 1920.
- Born: November 27, 1872; Amenia, New York
- Died: November 26, 1944 (aged 71); Brookline, Massachusetts
- Occupations: Entomologist, college administrator
- Known for: establishing the entomological collections at Rhode Island State College
- Parent(s): Henry Barlow and Helen Cythera (Benton) Barlow

John Barlow (November 27, 1872 – November 26, 1944) was an American entomologist and college administrator. For 35 years, he was the chairman of the Zoology Department of Rhode Island State College and was twice (1930–31 and 1940–41) interim president of the college.

== Early life and education ==
John Barlow was born in Amenia, New York, on November 27, 1872, to Henry Barlow and Helen Cythera (Benton) Barlow. He studied biology at Middlebury College, earning a B.A. degree in 1895, and he was elected to Phi Beta Kappa that same year. He earned his M.A. in biology from Brown University in 1896. After several years of teaching and research, he was awarded D.Sc. degree by Middlebury College in 1932.

== Professional career ==
After a short time as an assistant biologist at the Rhode Island Agricultural Experiment Station in 1897-98, Barlow assumed a faculty position teaching biology at Fairmount College in Wichita, Kansas, from 1898 to 1901. Barlow returned to Kingston, Rhode Island, to stay in 1902 when he accepted the positions of Professor of Zoology and chairman of the Department of Zoology at the Rhode Island College of Agriculture and Mechanic Arts. He remained as chairman of the Zoology Department for over 35 years. He was a respected entomologist who had built up the entomological collections of the college and was known to his students as "Buggy Barlow". In 1930, he was named Vice-President and Dean of Men near the end of the presidency of Howard Edwards. In 1931, he added the title of Dean of the School of Science and Business to his portfolio. During this period, he was appointed for two terms as interim president from April 1930 to March 1931 and again from March 1940 to October 1941 when another presidential vacancy with the resignation of Raymond Bressler. Barlow officially retired from the college on his seventieth birthday, November 27, 1942, and he died on November 26, 1944, at Baptist Hospital in Brookline, Massachusetts.

== Family and legacy ==
Barlow was married to Caroline Miller Barlow (1891-1979). His son, John Peleg Barlow (1918–1985), was an oceanographer at Cornell University and Woods Hole Oceanographic Institution. Barlow Hall, a residence hall on the campus of the University of Rhode Island, was named for Barlow.
