= Werner A. Baum =

American educator and college president (born 1887)

- Born: April 10, 1923; Giessen, Hesse, Germany
- Died: September 4, 1999 (aged 76); Tallahassee, Florida, US
- Known for: Seventh president of University of Rhode Island; Second chancellor of the University of Wisconsin-Milwaukee
- Spouse: Shirley Lorraine (Bowman) Baum (m. 19 Jan 1945)
- Children: 2

Academic background
- Education: University of Chicago (B.S. Mathematics 1943); University of Chicago (M.S. Meteorology 1944); University of Chicago (Ph.D. 1948); Husson College (D.P.A., 1972); Mount Saint Joseph College (Sc.D. honoris causa 1971); University of Rhode Island (Sc.D., honoris causa 1974)

Werner A. Baum (1923–1999) was the 2nd chancellor of University of Wisconsin–Milwaukee (1973-1979) and the 7th president of University of Rhode Island (1968-1973). Baum was a meteorologist by training and served as the president of the American Meteorological Society from 1977 to 1978.

== Early life and education ==
Werner A. Baum was born on April 10, 1923, in Giessen, Germany. He served in the United States Naval Reserve with the rank of lieutenant (jg) from 1944 to 1946. He earned all of his academic degrees at the University of Chicago; a Bachelor of Science in Mathematics in 1943, a Master of Science degree in Meteorology in 1944, and a doctorate in Meteorology in 1948.

== Career ==
From 1947 to 1949, Baum was an Assistant Professor of Geography at the University of Maryland. In 1949 he began a fourteen year career at Florida State University with an appointment as an Associate Professor and Chairman of the Department of Meteorology. He remained as department chair until 1958 when he was appointed Dean of the Graduate School and Director of Research. In 1960 he was named Dean of the Faculties at Florida State University. He served as vice president for academic affairs at Florida State University in 1963, then as vice president of academic affairs at the University of Miami, 1963-1965 and vice president science affairs, New York University, in New York City from 1965 to 1967.

Baum left academia during the Lyndon Johnson administration to serve from 1967-1968, having been appointed as the deputy administrator of Environmental Science Services in the United States Department of Commerce. Baum was appointed as president of the University of Rhode Island (URI) in 1968.

During his presidency at URI during the Richard Nixon administration, Baum and Clarence Tarzwell helped establish two federal laboratories adjacent to the URI Narragansett Bay Campus, the National Oceanic and Atmospheric Administration (NOAA) Fisheries Laboratory, and the Atlantic Ecology Laboratory (41.494139°N 71.422941°W) of the Environmental Protection Agency that was newly formed in 1972 as a result of the Clean Water Act. Baum left URI in 1973 to serve as chancellor at the University of Wisconsin, Milwaukee.

In 1979, Baum returned as dean of the College of Art and Sciences at Florida State University and remained until his retirement from academia in 1990. He was elected as a Fellow of the American Association for the Advancement of Science in 1955 and he was bestowed the AAAS Academy Freedom and Responsibility Award in 1985.

== Retirement and later career ==
In retirement from university administration, Baum continued to serve as Chairman National Climate Program Advisory Committee of the Environmental Protection Agency from 1979 until 1986.

Baum died on September 4, 1999 in Tallahassee, Florida.

== Selected publications ==
- Baum, W.A. (1944). Scherhag's Divergence Theorem. Bulletin of the American Meteorological Society 25(8):319-326. JSTOR:26257064
- Baum, W.A. (1949). On the relation between mean temperature and height in the layer of air near the ground. Ecology 30(1):104-107. DOI:10.2307/1932282
- Baum, W.A. (1951). Ecological use of meteorological temperature. Science 113(2934):333-334. DOI:10.1126/science.113.2934.333.b
- Baum, W.A. and L.B. Smith (1952). Semi-monthly mean sea-level pressure maps for the Mediterranean area. Archiv für Meteorologie, Geophysik und Bioklimatologie, Serie A, 5:326–345. DOI:10.1007/BF02247774
- Rosenthal, S.L. and W.A. Baum (1956). Diurnal Variation of Surface Pressure Over the North Atlantic Ocean. Monthly Weather Review 8(11):379-387. DOI:10.1175/1520-0493
- Baum, W.A. (1968). Congressional action on climate modification. Bulletin of the American Meteorological Society 49(3):234-237. JSTOR:26251546
- Baum, W.A. (1970). Implications of advancing technology on needs for world meteorological information. pp 51–55. In: Teweles, S., Giraytys, J. (eds) Meteorological Observations and Instrumentation. Meteorological Monographs, vol 11. American Meteorological Society, Boston, MA. DOI:10.1007/978-1-935704-35-5_9

Academic offices
Preceded by J. Martin Klotsche	Chancellor of the University of Wisconsin–Milwaukee; 1973 – 1979	Succeeded by Frank E. Horton

Academic offices
Preceded by Francis H. Horn	President of the University of Rhode Island; 1968 – 1973	Succeeded by Frank Newman
