= Bernhard Tollens =

German chemist (1841–1918)

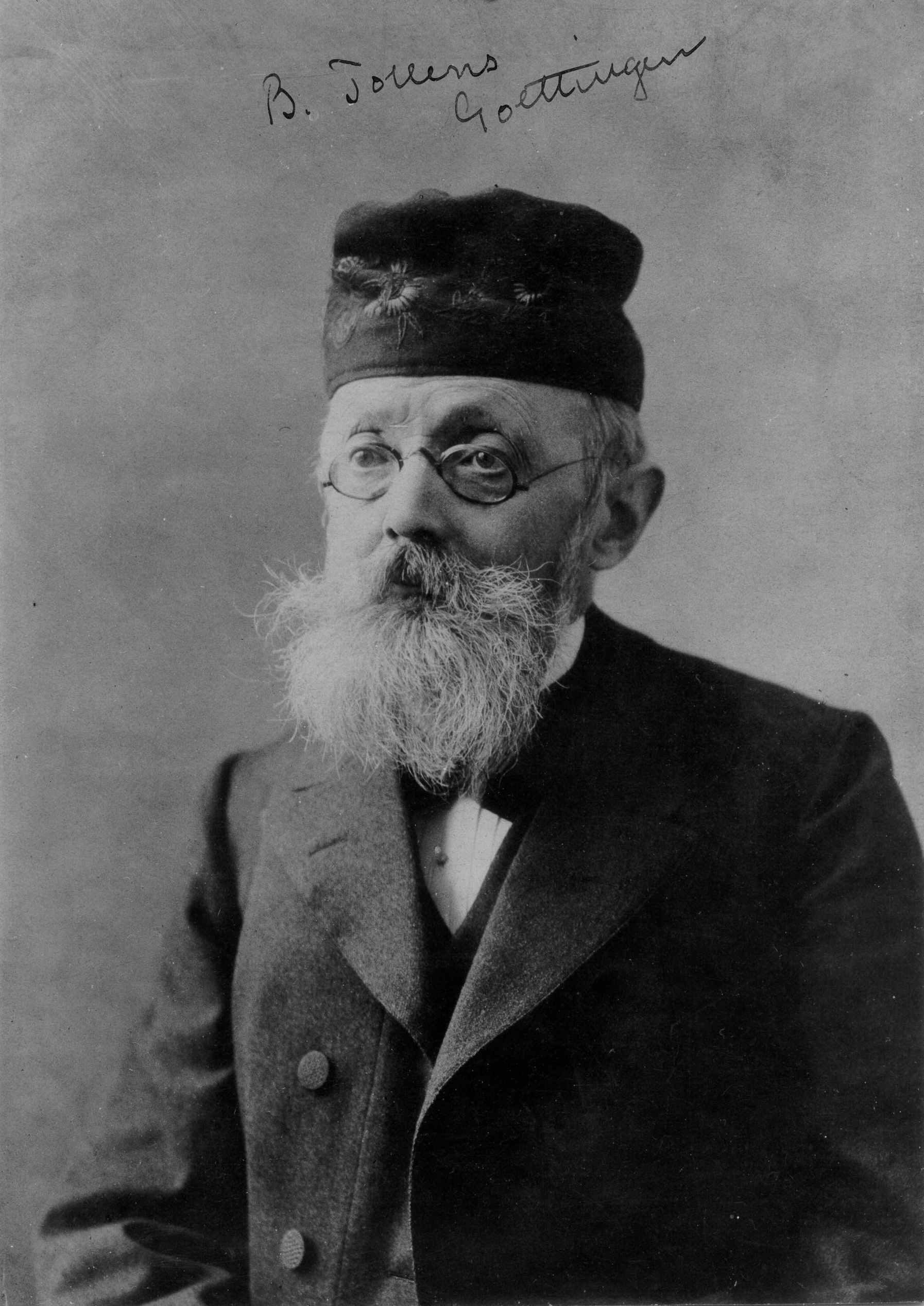
- Bernhard Tollens
- Born: 30 July 1841; Hamburg, German Confederation
- Died: 31 January 1918 (aged 76); Göttingen, Germany
- Education: University of Göttingen
- Known for: Carbohydrate chemistry
- Scientific career
- Doctoral advisor: Friedrich Wöhler
- Doctoral students: Emil Votoček, John Hosea Washburn, Homer Jay Wheeler, Wilhelm Rudolph Fittig

Bernhard Christian Gottfried Tollens (30 July 1841 – 31 January 1918) was a German chemist. He is known for discovering Tollens’ reagent, used to distinguish between aldehydes and ketones.

== Life and work ==
Tollens attended school at the Gelehrtenschule des Johanneums in Hamburg where he was influenced by his science teacher, Karl Möbius. After graduating in 1857, Tollens started an apprenticeship in pharmacy. He finished in 1862 and began studying chemistry in Göttingen in Wöhler's laboratory, then supervised by Friedrich Konrad Beilstein and Wilhelm Rudolph Fittig. In 1864, Tollens submitted his thesis and received his Ph.D. without a defense. The latter was possible through the intercession of Wöhler so that Tollens could accept and begin an attractive job at a bronze factory. Tollens left the job after six months and joined the group of Emil Erlenmeyer at the University of Heidelberg for six months. He later worked with Charles-Adolphe Wurtz in Paris and, for 11 months, as chief of the chemical laboratory at the University of Coimbra in Portugal.

Unable to resist the call of his former professor Wöhler, Tollens returned to Göttingen in 1872 and there he remained in various positions until he died in 1918. It was during this final time in Göttingen that he started his work on carbohydrates, which yielded structures of several sugars, the Tollens' reagent, and most of his publications.
