= Maryland-District of Columbia Campus Compact =

- Formation: 2008
- Type: Education and research
- Headquarters: Frederick, Maryland
- Region served: Regional
- Executive Director: Madeline Yates
- Website: www.mdccc.org

The Maryland-District of Columbia Campus Compact (MDCCC) was an educational association whose membership was made up of colleges and universities in Maryland and Washington, DC. Established in 2008 as the Maryland Campus Compact, it was extended to include DC in 2011, further expanded in 2017 to include Delaware and renamed as Transform Midatlantic in 2022 (after it left the national Campus Compact organisation).

== Member institutions ==
The organization is composed of 33 affiliate members.

- American University
- Bowie State University
- Carroll Community College
- Catholic University of America
- Chesapeake College
- Coppin State University
- Frostburg State University
- Gallaudet University
- Garrett College
- George Washington University
- Georgetown University
- Goucher College
- Hood College
- Howard Community College
- Johns Hopkins University
- Loyola University Maryland
- Maryland Institute College of Art
- McDaniel College
- Montgomery College
- Morgan State University
- Notre Dame of Maryland University
- Prince George's Community College
- Salisbury University
- St. Mary's College of Maryland
- Stevenson University
- Towson University
- University of Baltimore
- University of the District of Columbia
- University of Maryland, Baltimore
- University of Maryland, Baltimore County
- University of Maryland, College Park
- University of Maryland Eastern Shore
- Washington Adventist University
- Wesley Theological Seminary
