= F. Donald James =

Methodist minister and academic

Forrest Donald James (1927–2019) was an ordained Methodist minister and academic who served as the acting president of the University of Rhode Island from 1967 to 1968 and President of Central Connecticut State University from 1968 to 1987.

== Early life and education ==
F. Don James was born on 14 December 1927 in Oklahoma City, Oklahoma to Forrest James and Dorothy (Donaldson) James. In 1945 enlisted in the United States Navy and served as a coxwain on a Landing Craft Infantry (LCI(R)-1030) in the Western Pacific. He served for three years in the Navy and began studies at Oklahoma City University, earning an A.B in English in 1951. He then undertook theological studies at Boston University School of Theology, earning his STB degree in 1954. He continued on at Boston University, earning his Ph.D. there in 1959.

== Professional life ==
As an ordained Methodist minister, James served as a student pastor in Coyle, Oklahoma, and as an assistant pastor of the Congregational Church in Swampscott, Massachusetts from 1952 to 1958. His academic career began at Miami University of Ohio in Oxford, Ohio, as professor in the Department of Religion. He served as an assistant dean in the School of Arts and Sciences at Miami University from 1958 to 1965. He was appointed by Fran Horn as provost and academic vice president at the University of Rhode Island, Kingston, Rhode Island serving from 1965 to 1967. Upon Horn's departure from the university, he served as acting president from 1967 to 1968. He then served as president of Central Connecticut State University from 1968 to 1987.

Since the 1950s James was a part-time resident in Zollikon, Switzerland, and he was a long-time resident of Brookline, Massachusetts. He died on 6 May 2019 in Zollikon.
