= J. Martin Klotsche =

American professor (1907–1995)

Chancellor of the University of Wisconsin–Milwaukee
- In office 1946–1973
- Preceding: Position established
- Preceded by: Werner A. Baum

Personal details
- Born: Johannes Martin Klotsche; November 28, 1907 Scribner, Nebraska
- Died: 4 February 1995 (89 years old) Oostburg, Wisconsin
- Spouse: Roberta Roberts Klotsche
- Education: University of Nebraska (1928); University of Wisconsin (1931)
- Occupation: Professor

Johannes Martin "Joe" Klotsche (November 28, 1907 – 4 February 1995), was an American professor of history and the first chancellor of the University of Wisconsin–Milwaukee, serving as the chief executive of the school and its predecessors from 1946 to 1973.

== Biography ==
Klotsche was born on 28 November 1907 in Scribner, Nebraska. He graduated high school at age 13, and college at age 17. he earned his M.A. at the University of Nebraska in 1928. He got his Ph.D. in history from the University of Wisconsin in 1931 and came to Milwaukee to teach at what was then Wisconsin State Teachers College-Milwaukee, a small teachers college with an enrollment of 1700. He became President of the college in the fall of 1946, when he was 38. It was renamed Wisconsin State College-Milwaukee in 1951, and Klotsche's title was changed to Provost). In 1956, the college was merged with the University of Wisconsin-Extension's Milwaukee center to form the University of Wisconsin-Milwaukee, with Klotsche remaining as provost. In 1965, his title was changed to chancellor. After his retirement as chancellor in 1973, he remained on the faculty of the History Department until 1978.

Klotsche's administration oversaw UWM's growth from a small teacher's college to a major university. Enrollment increased from 1,700 to almost 25,000; construction or purchase of more than 20 major buildings (not counting off-campus buildings); and the establishment of ten schools and colleges. The Klotsche Center for Physical Education on the UWM campus is named for him.

He earned a reputation as a strong supporter of student and faculty rights, often taking strong stands to defend them. Klotsche displayed a continued interest in foreign policy by directing events for the Institute of World Affairs in Geneva; Paris; and Salisbury, Connecticut; and by helping the U.S. Office of Education organize a school-community project in Germany. He also served as the president of the Wisconsin Academy of Sciences, Arts and Letters.

After his retirement from teaching, Klotsche and his wife, Roberta Roberts Klotsche, lived for some time in Arizona; after her death, he returned to Wisconsin, living in Oostburg in Sheboygan County. He died there on 4 February 1995.

He was the longest serving chancellor of the university.

== Books ==
- The Role of the United States in World Affairs 1940
- The United States and Latin America 1940
- The Urban university and the Future of Our Cities 1966
- The University of Wisconsin–Milwaukee, An Urban University 1972
- Confessions of an educator : my personal and professional memoirs 1985
- Together We Travelled 1986
- Then and Now : Views of an Educator 1987
- A Woman of Courage: The Life and Times of Annette Roberts (w/ Roberta Roberts Klotsche) 1988
- Life Begins at Eighty (w/ Adolph A. Suppan) 1991
- The University of Wisconsin–Milwaukee : A Historical Profile, 1885-1992 (by Frank A. Cassell, J. Martin Klotsche, and Frederick I. Olson, with the assistance of Donald R. Shea and Bea Bourgeois) 1992

Academic offices
Preceded by	Provost of Wisconsin State College-Milwaukee; 1946-1956 (titled as president 1946-1951)	Succeeded by Himself as Provost of UWM
Preceded by Himself as Provost of WSCM	Chancellor of the University of Wisconsin–Milwaukee; 1956 – 1973 (titled as provost 1956-1965)	Succeeded by Werner A. Baum
