= Education Commission of the States =

The Education Commission of the States (ECS) is a nonprofit that tracks educational policy. Over 300 appointed commissioners from across the United States lead it . ECS was founded as a result of the creation of the Compact for Education, an interstate compact approved by Congress and works with all 50 U.S. states, three territories (American Samoa, Guam and Northern Mariana Islands) and the District of Columbia.

The idea of establishing a compact on education and creating an operational arm to follow up on its goals was originally proposed by James Bryant Conant, president of Harvard University. Between 1965 and 1967, John W. Gardner, president of the Carnegie Corporation of New York and former North Carolina Governor Terry Sanford took up the idea, drafted the proposed Compact, obtained the endorsement of all 50 states and got Congress' approval.

The organization opened its offices in Denver in 1967. It administered the National Assessment of Educational Progress (NAEP) until the Reagan administration privatized the test in 1982, which is now administered by the Educational Testing Service (ETS). That decision threatened the commission's very existence, leading to the virtual closure of ECS's Information Clearinghouse, the layoff or early retirement of half of its 117-member staff, and a 50% cut in the organization's budget.

Each member jurisdiction (state, territory, and the District of Columbia) has seven seats on the commission, including the governor and six appointed members, usually including members of the state legislature and education officials, such as the state education commissioner or head of the state education agency.

== Awards ==
The commission presents three awards annually. The James Bryant Conant award has been given since 1977 for "outstanding individual contributions to education". The commission also presents the Frank Newman award to a state or territory and a corporate award to a corporation or nonprofit organization.

== Commission chairs ==
The governor of a member jurisdiction serves as the commissioner chair. The term changed from one year to two years in 2002. It alternates between political parties.

As chairman from 2004-2006 and Governor of Arkansas, Mike Huckabee launched an effort to increase student participation in the arts. An analysis released in 2008 found that elementary school class time for the arts had decreased by an average of 35%.

Term	Governor	State	Focus
Organizing	Terry Sanford	North Carolina	
1965–1966	John H. Chafee	Rhode Island	
1966–1967	Charles L. Terry Jr.	Delaware	
1967–1968	Cal Rampton	Utah	
1968–1969	Robert E. McNair	South Carolina	
1969–1970	Tom McCall	Oregon	
1970–1971	Russell W. Peterson	Delaware	
1971–1972	Robert W. Scott	North Carolina	
1972–1973	Winfield Dunn	Tennessee	
1973–1974	Reubin Askew	Florida	
1974–1975	John C. West	South Carolina	
1975–1976	Arch A. Moore Jr.	West Virginia	
1976–1977	Jerry Apodaca	New Mexico	
1977–1978	Otis R. Bowen	Indiana	
1978–1979	Dixy Lee Ray	Washington	
1979–1980	William G. Milliken	Michigan	
1980–1981	Bob Graham	Florida	
1981–1982	Robert D. Ray	Iowa	
1982–1983	James B. Hunt Jr.	North Carolina	
1983–1984	Pierre S. du Pont	Delaware	
1984–1985	Charles S. Robb	Virginia	Business and Education Reform
1985–1986	Thomas Kean	New Jersey	Teacher Renaissance: Improving Undergraduate Education
1986–1987	Bill Clinton	Arkansas	Speaking of Leadership
1987–1988	John Ashcroft	Missouri	Family Involvement in the Schools
1988–1989	Rudy Perpich	Minnesota	Partners in Learning: Linking College Mentors with At-Risk Schools
1989–1990	Garrey E. Carruthers	New Mexico	Sharing Responsibility for Success
1990–1991	Booth Gardner	Washington	All Kids Can Learn
1991–1992	John R. McKernan Jr.	Maine	Keeping the Promises of Reform
1992–1993	Evan Bayh	Indiana	Education for a Revitalized Democracy
1993–1994	Jim Edgar	Illinois	Building Communities that Support Education Reform
1994–1995	Roy Romer	Colorado	Making Quality Count in Undergraduate Education
1995–1996	Tommy Thompson	Wisconsin	Connecting Learning and Work
1996–1997	Terry Branstad	Iowa	Harnessing Technology for Teaching and Learning
1997–1998	Zell Miller	Georgia	Investing in Student Achievement
1998–1999	Paul E. Patton	Kentucky	Transforming Postsecondary Education
1999–2000	Jim Geringer	Wyoming	In Pursuit of Quality Teaching
2000–2001	Jeanne Shaheen	New Hampshire	Early Learning: Improving Results for Young Children
2001–2002	Kenny Guinn	Nevada	Leading for Literacy
2002–2003	Roy Barnes	Georgia	Closing the Achievement Gap
2003–2004	Mark Warner	Virginia	High-Quality Teachers for Hard-to-Staff Schools
2004–2006	Mike Huckabee	Arkansas	The Arts: A Lifetime of Learning
2006–2008	Kathleen Sebelius	Kansas	Great Teachers for Tomorrow
2008–2010	Tim Pawlenty	Minnesota	
2010–2012	John Hickenlooper	Colorado	
2012–2014	Brian Sandoval	Nevada	
2015–2017	Steve Bullock	Montana	
2017–2019	Phil Bryant	Mississippi	
2019–2021	Tom Wolf	Pennsylvania	
2021–2022	Kim Reynolds	Iowa	
2022–2023	Asa Hutchinson	Arkansas	Expand K12 computer science education
2023–2025	Laura Kelly	Kansas	

== Commission executive directors/presidents ==
Tenure	Name	Title
1967–1976	Wendell H. Pierce	Executive director
1976–1980	Warren Hill	Executive director
1980–1984	Robert Andringa	Executive director
1985–1999	Frank Newman	President
2000–2005	Ted Sanders	President
2005–2006	Piedad F. Robertson	President
2007–2012	Roger Sampson	President
2012–2024	Jeremy Anderson	President
2024–present	Jose Munoz	President

== Sources ==
- Official website
