= John Hosea Washburn =

American chemist (born 1859)

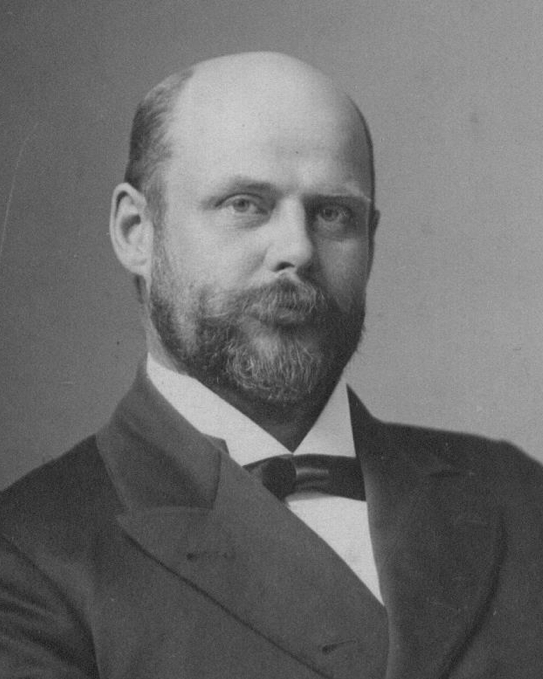
- John Hosea Washburn c. 1890
- Born: June 5, 1859; Bridgewater, Massachusetts, US
- Died: August 3, 1932 (aged 73); Doylestown, Pennsylvania, US
- Education: Massachusetts Agricultural College/Boston University (BS-joint agricultural program), Massachusetts Agricultural College graduate studies in agricultural science Brown University graduate studies in chemistry University of Göttingen (PhD)
- Known for: Founding president of University of Rhode Island
- Spouse: Martha Williams Merrow (m. 1887)
- Children: John Merrow Washburn, Elizabeth Merrow (Washburn) Miller
- Scientific career
- Fields: Agricultural chemistry
- Workplaces: Connecticut Agricultural College; Rhode Island College of Agriculture and Mechanic Arts (president); National Farm School (director)
- Thesis: Ueber den Rohrzucker des Maiskorns und über amerikanischen Süssmais in verschiedenen Stadien der Reife. (On the Cane Sugar of the Corn Kernel and on American Sweet Corn in Different Stages of Maturity.) (1889)
- Doctoral advisor: Bernhard Tollens

John Hosea Washburn (1859–1932) was an American chemist with expertise in agricultural chemistry, and university administrator who served as the founding president of Rhode Island College of Agriculture and Mechanic Arts (forerunner of the University of Rhode Island) from 1892 to 1902, and director of the National Farm School (the forerunner of Delaware Valley University) from 1902 to 1917.

== Early life and education ==
Washburn was born June 5, 1859, in Bridgewater, Massachusetts, to Hosea Washburn and Weltha Whitmore (Packard) Washburn. In 1878, he earned his bachelor's degree (S.B.) in a joint Agricultural Science program between Massachusetts Agricultural College and Boston University. After graduation he taught in Massachusetts public schools for a year and became head of the Rhode Island Reform School in Cranston, Rhode Island. During that time he engaged in studies in chemistry at Brown University. He married Martha Williams Merrow, daughter of Joseph Battel Merrow and Harriet Millard Merrow, on May 26, 1887, in Willimantic, Connecticut, a month prior their departure for Germany for his doctoral studies. He earned his doctoral degree in 1889 at the University of Göttingen in the field of agricultural chemistry.

== Academic career ==
Washburn's first academic appointment was as an instructor of chemistry at Connecticut Agricultural College in 1883, where he remained until 1887 when he traveled to Germany for his doctoral studies. Upon his return to the United States in 1889, he was appointed as first principal of the newly founded Rhode Island Agricultural School that was associated with the Rhode Island Agricultural Experiment Station founded the prior year in Kingston, Rhode Island. Upon the founding of the Rhode Island College of Agriculture and Mechanic Arts in 1892, he became its first president. During his tenure as president of the college, he was instrumental in initiating the sports programs, instituting admissions requirements in line with the requirements of the Association of American Agricultural Colleges and Experiment Stations, establishment of the Military Science and Tactics Program, transfer of Morrill Land Grant Act of 1862 funds from Brown University for support of the college, and establishment of a marine biological laboratory as part of the Rhode Island Agricultural Experiment Station.

Washburn was respected by the students, with George Edward Adams, one of the 1894 graduates who later served as Dean of Agriculture remarking, "The students not only liked him, but he made a lasting impression." Additionally, he was respected nationally serving as the chairperson of the Section on Mechanic Arts of the Association of American Agricultural Colleges and Experiment Stations, and in 1894 made the treasurer of the same organization. Also, in 1894, he was elected to the Board of Visitors of Wellesley College. However, his self-opinionated and occasional undiplomatic manner with members of the college's Board of Managers led to his ouster and his resignation as president in 1902.

Shortly after leaving Rhode Island, Washburn became the director of the newly founded National Farm School in Doylestown, Pennsylvania. During his fifteen-year tenure as director, he was able to grow student enrollments substantially and leave the institution on a steady financial footing. He retired from academic life in 1917, and he died at his home in Doylestown in 1932.

== Family ==
Washburn's wife, Marta Williams (Merrow) Washburn was the youngest daughter of Connecticut industrialist Joseph Battel Merrow, president of the Merrow Sewing Machine Company. She was granddaughter of Joseph Maken Merrow, the founder and namesake of the company, that began with the manufacture of gunpowder, but developed their international reputation as manufacturers of industrial sewing machines, knitting machines, and crocheting machines. Her brother, Joseph Millard Merrow, assumed the company presidency upon their father's death. Washburn's son, John Merrow Washburn, assumed the presidency of the company upon his uncle's retirement.

== Legacy ==
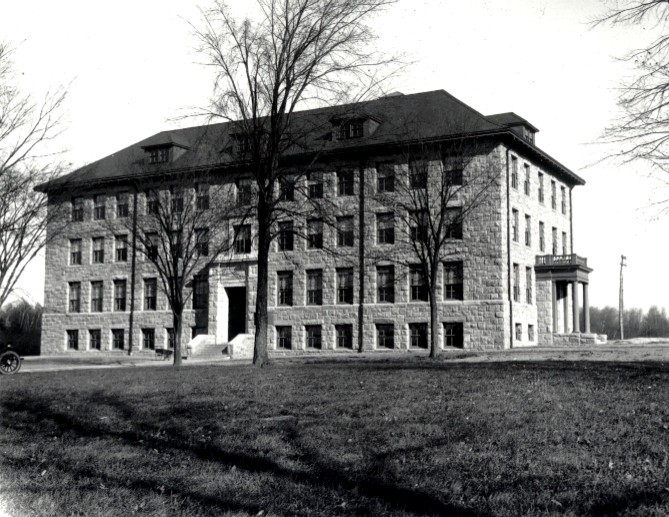
Washburn Hall at the University of Rhode Island in 1921

In 1921, an agricultural laboratory building was built on the central quadrangle of the Rhode Island State College and named Washburn Hall in his honor.

== Selected publications ==
- Washburn, J.H. and B. Tollens. 1889. Ueber Mais und Gewinnung von krystallisirtem Rohrzucker aus demselben. Berichte der deutschen chemischen Gesellschaft 22(1):1047-1048. https://doi.org/10.1002/cber.188902201227
- Washburn, J.H. and B. Tollens. 1890. Ueber die Abscheidung von krystallisirtem Rohrzucker aus dem Maiskorn. Justus Liebigs Annalen der Chemie 257(2):156-160. https://doi.org/10.1002/jlac.18902570203

Academic offices
First	1st President of University of Rhode Island; 1892-1902	Succeeded by Kenyon L. Butterfield
