= Edward D. Eddy =

American educator and college administrator

Edward Danforth Eddy Jr.
- Born: May 10, 1921; Saratoga Springs, New York, U.S.
- Died: June 28, 1998 (aged 77); South Kingstown, Rhode Island, U.S.
- Known for: Ninth president of University of Rhode Island
- Spouse: Mary Atherton "Polly" (Schurman) Eddy (June 9, 1949)
- Children: Edward Danforth Eddy III, Mary Isabel Eddy, Catherine Schurman Eddy, David Henning Eddy

Academic background
- Education: Cornell University (B.A. Humanities 1944); Yale University (M.Div. 1946); Cornell University (Ph.D. 1956)
- Thesis: The development of the land-grant colleges: their program and philosophy

Edward Danforth "Ted" Eddy Jr. (May 10, 1921 – June 28, 1998) was an American educator and college administrator. From 1949 to 1960, he was at the University of New Hampshire in various administrative capacities. In 1960, he became president of Chatham College in Pittsburgh, and in 1977 he was appointed Provost of Pennsylvania State University. In 1983, he was selected as the ninth president of the University of Rhode Island and served until his retirement in 1991.

== Early life and education ==
Edward D. Eddy was born to Edward Danforth Eddy Sr. and Martha Linden (Henning) Eddy on May 10, 1921 at Saratoga Springs, New York. He attended Cornell University, where he received a B.A. in humanities in 1944, and earned a Master of Divinity degree from Yale University in 1946.

At Cornell, he was editor-in-chief of The Cornell Daily Sun preceding Kurt Vonnegut in the post, and he and a member of the Quill and Dagger society. He went on to receive his Ph.D. from Cornell in 1956.

== Career ==
Eddy began his career as associate director of Cornell's interfaith office in 1946. On June 9, 1949, he was married in New York City to Mary Atherton "Polly" Schurman (1930-2020), granddaughter of Jacob Gould Schurman, a former president of Cornell University and chairperson of the Schurman Commission.

From 1949 to 1960, Eddy was several positions at the University of New Hampshire. He was the Assistant to the President from 1949 to 1954, then served as acting president in 1954 and 1955. From 1955 to 1960, he was the provost and a vice president. He left the University of New Hampshire in 1960 to assume the presidency of Chatham College in Pittsburgh.

In 1977, he was appointed Provost of Pennsylvania State University. In 1983, he was selected as the ninth president of the University of Rhode Island, a position he held until his retirement in 1991. As president of the University of Rhode Island he is credited with expanding the research portfolio of the university in marine and environmental sciences and other fields.

Upon retirement from the university in 1991, Eddy and his wife Polly resided in South Kingstown, Rhode Island until his death on June 28, 1998. Polly remained in South Kingstown and was active in local philanthropy and politics, including ten years as a town councilwoman, until her death on October 25, 2020.

== Selected publications ==
- Eddy, E.D. (1957). Colleges for Our Land and Time: The Land-Grant Idea in American Education. Harper and Company, New York. 328pp.
- Eddy, E.D., M.L. Parkhurst, and J.S. Yakovakis. (1959). The College Influence on Student Character. Committee for the Study of Character Development in Education, American Council on Education, Washington, D.C. 185pp.

Academic offices
Preceded by Frank Newman	President of the University of Rhode Island; 1983-1991	Succeeded by Robert L. Carothers
