= Carl R. Woodward =

American educator and college president (1890–1974)

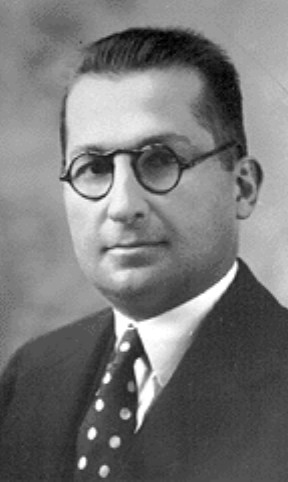
- Woodward in 1921
- Born: June 20, 1890; Tennent, New Jersey, US
- Died: October 2, 1974 (aged 84); South Kingstown, Rhode Island, US
- Known for: Fifth president of University of Rhode Island
- Spouse: Lulu Altha Ryno (m. 1916)
- Children: 3

Academic background
- Education: Rutgers University (B.S. 1914); Rutgers University (M.A. 1919); Cornell University (Ph.D. 1929)
- Thesis: Educational influences in the agriculture of New Jersey prior to 1880

Carl Raymond Woodward, Sr. (1890–1974) was an American educator and college administrator who served from 1915 to 1941 in various positions at Rutgers University, and from 1941 to 1958 as the fifth president of the University of Rhode Island.

== Early life and education ==
Woodward was born on 20 July 1890 in Tennent, New Jersey, attended the public schools and graduated in 1906 from Freehold High School. From 1908 until 1910, he taught in a one-room rural school in Monmouth County, New Jersey. He attended Rutgers University beginning in 1910 and earned his BS in 1914 and MA in 1919. He married Lulu Altha Ryno on 5 April 1916, and they had three children. He went on to earn his PhD at Cornell University in 1926.

== Professional career ==
At Rutgers University from 1915 to 1916, Woodward served as Editor and Librarian of the New Jersey Agricultural Experiment Station, part of the College of Agriculture. From 1916-1927, he collaborated with Selman Waksman, who discovered streptomycin and several other antibiotics. For six years during this period, 1920-1926, he was an Instructor in English, then promoted in 1926 to Assistant Professor of English. After serving as an Assistant Professor for one year, he left both this position and his position as Editor and Secretary, and became involved with university public relations work and university trustee relations for a year. Then in 1928, he was named as Assistant to the President, by President John Martin Thomas, a position he also held under Acting President Philip M. Brett, 1930 from to 1931, and under President Robert C. Clothier from 1932 to 1936. In 1936, President Clothier appointed Woodward Secretary of Rutgers University, a post he held until 1941.

In 1941, he was named the 5th president of what was then Rhode Island State College (RISC). Woodward divided his tenure into three distinct periods: the war years, 1941-1945; the post-war period, 1946-1951; and the period of University development, 1951-1958. In the first of these periods, the College’s entire resources were focused on coping with the unprecedented emergency brought home by the war. In 1942, Woodward inaugurated a year-round accelerated program which allowed students to complete their studies in less than three years rather than the traditional four. In 1943, the Army Specialized Training Program came to campus, bringing with it a total of 800 military inductees over the next ten months for specialized military training. The trainees lived in dormitories converted to barracks, while civilian students moved into fraternities for the duration of the war. Despite these efforts, however, enrollment dropped from a pre-war high of 1216 in 1940 to a war-time low of 363 in the spring of 1944.

After the war in 1946, Woodward was faced with a host of new problems. Favorable economic conditions, the growing demands of business and industry, and the G.I. Bill combined to bring an overwhelming influx of students to Kingston. By the spring of 1946 enrollment had ballooned to 3200 students who needed more programs, more faculty, and more space. With a special appropriation made available by the General Assembly, the College was able to obtain war surplus buildings, including Quonset huts, for use of dormitories, dining rooms, and classrooms. In 1951, Rhode Island State College achieved university status by act of the legislature and Woodward served as the 1st president of University of Rhode Island until his retirement in 1958.

During his presidential tenure at the University of Rhode Island, he was the recipient of nine honorary degrees from, among others, Rutgers University, Boston University, Brown University and Northeastern University. Woodward received numerous awards, authored several articles and books, and belonged to several professional organizations, church and civic societies. He was a consultant to the Industrial Research and Development Division, U. S. Department of Commerce, and served on the Board of Trustees of Bryant College.

== Retirement and legacy ==
In retirement, he remained active for 18 years with the university and historic preservation communities in Rhode Island, including the preservation of Smith's Castle at Cocumscussoc and the Watson House on the URI Campus. Woodward Hall on the URI Campus was named in his honor in 1959, he was named a member of the State of Rhode Island Heritage Hall of Fame a year after his death, and he was inducted into the URI Sports Hall of Fame in 1976. Woodward died on 2 October 1974 in South Kingstown, Rhode Island.

== Selected publications ==
- App, F. and C.R. Woodward. (1924). The farmer and his farm. Harcourt, Brace and Company, New York. 338pp.
- Woodward, C.R. (1930). Agriculture in New Jersey. American Historical Society, New York. 144pp.
- Woodward, C.R. (1941). Ploughs and politicks: Charles Read of New Jersey and his notes on agriculture, 1715-1774. New Brunswick, Rutgers University Press. 468pp.
- Woodward, C.R. (1957). Education's "lively experiment" in Rhode Island. Newcomen Society in North America, New York vol. 12; no. 21. 28pp.
- Woodward, C.R. (1971). Plantation in Yankeeland: the story of Cocumscussoc, mirror of colonial Rhode Island. Pequot Press, Chester, CT. 198pp.

Academic offices
Preceded by Raymond G. Bressler, Sr.	President of the University of Rhode Island; 1941 – 1958	Succeeded by Francis H. Horn
