= Frank Newman (educator) =

American educator and college president (born 1927)

Frank James Newman, Jr.
- Born: February 14, 1927; Flushing, New York
- Died: May 29, 2004 (aged 77); Providence, Rhode Island
- Known for: Eighth president of University of Rhode Island; Higher education reforms
- Spouse: Lucile Pettibone (Fanning) Newman (m. 1951)
- Children: Kenneth, James, Michael

Academic background
- Education: Brown University (B.A. 1946; B.S. 1949); Oxford University (1949-50); Columbia University (M.S. 1952); 40 honorary doctorates

Frank James Newman, Jr. (February 24, 1927 – May 29, 2004) was a US education reformer and administrator who produced the Newman Reports, two ground-breaking reports on higher education in the United States that were published in 1971 and 1974. He served as the eighth President of the University of Rhode Island (1974–1983).

After a period as a fellow for the Carnegie Foundation for the Advancement of Teaching, he co-founded Campus Compact in 1985. Newman was president for 14 years from 1985 to 1999 of the Education Commission of the States. He then founded the Futures Project at Brown University and taught there and at Teachers College, Columbia University. Following his death aged 77, education awards and fellowships were named in his honour.

== Early life and career ==
Frank J. Newman was born on February 24, 1927, in Flushing, New York, and grew up in Mamaroneck, New York. He was one of three children of Frank and Dorothy (Lawlor) Newman. His undergraduate (BA) degree at Brown University was in Naval Science and Economics and he graduated in 1946. This was followed by a degree in electrical engineering, awarded from Brown in 1949. After a period as an economics student at Oxford University in the UK, he returned to the US and began work with the Honeywell Regulator Company that dealt in thermostat technology. During this period, he studied for and obtained a Master of Science in Business Administration from Columbia University.

Newman married Lucile Fanning in 1951 and they had three sons: Kenneth, James, and Michael. His wife would become a professor at Brown University.

From 1955 to 1965, Newman worked for Beckman Instruments.

Newman ran as a Republican on an antiwar platform in the 1966 United States House of Representatives elections, standing in California's 14th congressional district. He stood first in the special election held on 7 June 1966 following the death of Republican Representative John F. Baldwin, Jr., coming second to Democratic candidate Jerome R. Waldie. Newman stood again in the general election held on 8 November 1966, and again came second to Waldie.

Following his failure to secure election, Newman spent seven years as the Director of University Relations at Stanford University (1967–1974).

== Education reform and administration ==
Newman's best-known works on education reform were the 'Newman Reports' of 1971 and 1974, formally the 'Report on Higher Education' and 'The Second Newman Report: National Policy and Higher Education'.

For nine years he served as the eighth President of the University of Rhode Island (1974–1983).

He resigned his position at the University of Rhode Island to take up a Presidential Fellowship at the Carnegie Foundation for the Advancement of Teaching. In 1985, his Carnegie Foundation Report, titled Higher Education and the American Resurgence, stated:

The enduring and honorable American tradition of opportunity through education must function for the whole of the population. This requires higher education to do a better job of drawing people from all segments of society into those programs that lead to positions of leadership in the life of the country.

In 1985, Newman was a co-founder with the presidents of Stanford University, Brown University, and Georgetown University, of the organisation Campus Compact. For 14 years from 1985 to 1999, Newman was President of the Education Commission of the States. In 1999 he was the founder and director of 'The Futures Project: Policy for Higher Education in a Changing World'. At the time of its founding, the Futures Project was based at Brown University's Center for Public Policy and American Institutions and was funded by the Pew Charitable Trusts.

Newman was appointed the Julius and Rosa Sachs Lecturer for the 1999–2000 academic year by Teachers College, Columbia University, where he was a Visiting Professor. Also in 1999, he was elected an alumni trustee of Brown University's Brown Corporation. He was also a Visiting Professor of Public Policy and Sociology at Brown University. On 13 May 2003, Newman testified before the United States House Committee on Education and the Workforce.

== Honours and tributes ==
In March 1977, Newman was made a "High Officer" of the Order of Prince Henry the Navigator, with the award being presented by the Portuguese Secretary of State for Emigration. Newman was made an honorary University of Rhode Island alumnus in 1979, followed by a University of Rhode Island honorary degree in 1989. Newman received the William Rogers Award from the Alumni Association of Brown University in 1994. The 1999 announcement of his election as alumni trustee at Brown University stated that he held 40 honorary degrees. Also in 1999, he received the James Bryant Conant Award from the Education Commission of the States. In 2002, the admissions building at the University of Rhode Island was renamed the Frank Newman Hall. This name change was formally recognised by the Rhode Island State Assembly: Frank Newman Hall: "The facility located at 14 Upper College Road on the Kingston Campus of the University of Rhode Island shall be named the Frank Newman Hall - Rhode Island General Laws 22-7.4-79.

== Death and legacy ==
Newman died aged 77 on May 29, 2004, in Miriam Hospital, Providence, Rhode Island. The cause was melanoma. He had been living in Jamestown at the time of his death, and was survived by his wife and three children. A memorial service was held at Brown University in June 2004. The then-President of the University of Rhode Island, Robert L. Carothers, paid tribute to Newman, calling him "one of the great thinkers in higher education". In 2005, the Education Commission of the States renamed its State Innovation Award in his honour. Also bearing his name are the Newman Civic Fellows Awards, administered by Campus Compact and originally called the Frank Newman Leadership Awards.

== Selected works ==
Newman authored a number of books on education reform.

- 1971: Report on Higher Education: Frank Newman
- 1974: The Second Newman Report: National Policy and Higher Education
- 1985: Higher Education and the American Resurgence (The Carnegie Foundation for the Advancement of Teaching)
- 2004: The Future of Higher Education: Rhetoric, Reality, and the Risks of the Market (co-author with Lara Couturier and Jamie Scurry)

Academic offices
Preceded by Francis H. Horn	President of the University of Rhode Island; 1974 – 1983	Succeeded by Edward D. Eddy
