= William R. Ferrante =

American educator and college administrator

William Robert Ferrante (March 9, 1928 – June 14, 2014) was an American educator and college administrator. He served for five decades as a professor of mechanical engineering, and administrator at the University of Rhode Island. He was named acting president, twice in 1977 and 1983.

Ferrante was born in Providence, Rhode Island and graduated in 1945 from La Salle Academy in Providence. He earned his BS in electrical engineering from Rhode Island State College in 1949, and MS in applied mathematics in 1959 at Brown University. He went on to get his PhD in engineering mathematics at Virginia Polytechnic Institute in 1962. After a brief career beginning in 1962 as a professional engineer with Boeing in Seattle, Washington, and with Allis-Chalmers in Milwaukee, Wisconsin. He also had a brief stint teaching engineering at Virginia Tech, he joined the faculty at the University of Rhode Island in the Department of Mechanical Engineering where he remained for forty years. He was twice named acting president of the University of Rhode Island, in 1977 and 1983, and served as Provost and Vice President for Academic Affairs from 1972 to 1988. He also served as dean of the graduate school and chair of the Faculty Senate. Ferrante died 14 June 2014 in Providence.
