= Raymond G. Bressler Sr. =

American educator and college president (born 1887)

Raymond George Bressler Sr.
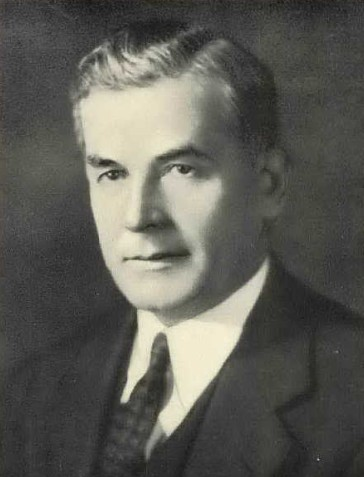
- Raymond G. Bressler 1933
- Born: March 9, 1887; Halifax, Pennsylvania, US
- Died: May 9, 1948 (aged 61); South Kingstown, Rhode Island, US
- Known for: Fourth president of University of Rhode Island
- Spouse: Sarah Estella (Lebo) "Sadie" Bressler (m. 1910)
- Children: 5

Academic background
- Education: Shippensburg State Normal School (diploma 1904); Valparaiso University (B.A. 1908); Wofford College (M.A. 1910); Agricultural and Mechanical College of Texas (B.S. 1918); University of Wisconsin–Madison (M.S. 1919); Teachers College, Columbia University (1930-1931); Northeastern University (LL.D. honoris causa 1932); Rhode Island College of Education (Ed.D., honoris causa 1932)

Raymond George Bressler Sr. (1887–1948) was an American educator with expertise in American literature and agricultural extension who served as a university administrator in Texas and Pennsylvania, and served as president of Rhode Island State College (forerunner of the University of Rhode Island) from 1931 to 1940. While serving as president during the Great Depression, Bressler managed decreasing student enrollments and ambitious building projects on campus primarily funded by the Works Progress Administration. Despite his success in guiding the numerous building projects and his popularity among students and faculty, he fell into political disfavor with the college's board of trustees, leading to his forced retirement in 1940. Despite Bressler's disfavor with the trustees, the newly elected Rhode Island Governor, J. Howard McGrath upon his inauguration in January 1941 granted Bressler an appointment to his cabinet as Director of Agriculture and Conservation, where he remained in office through the following gubernatorial administration of John O. Pastore until his death on 9 May 1948.

== Early life and education ==
Bressler was born 9 March 1887, in Halifax, Pennsylvania, to Ryan A. Bressler and Mary Ellen (Etzweiler) Bressler. At age 13, Bressler left school to work on the railroads, where he earned enough money to attend Shippensburg State Normal School, and graduate with an teacher's diploma in 1904. After teaching grammar school for two years in Pennsylvania, Bressler went on to further his education, first earning a B.A. degree in literature at Valparaiso University in 1908, followed by an M.A. in the same field from Wofford College in 1910. Bressler married Sarah Estella "Sadie" Lebo on 4 February 1910 in Halifax, Pennsylvania

== Academic career ==
Bressler's first post-secondary academic appointment was as an instructor of literature at the Agricultural and Mechanical College of Texas in 1910, where he remained until 1915, when he joined the faculty of University of Texas at Austin where he stayed until 1917. The following year, he returned to the Agriculture and Mechanical College of Texas in College Station to engage in studies of agricultural education and agricultural extension, graduating with a B.S. degree in 1918. He went on to the University of Wisconsin–Madison to earn his M.S. degree in agricultural extension in 1919. During the early 1920s he taught at Pennsylvania State College, where he became vice dean of agriculture from 1923 to 1927. Between 1927 and 1930, Bressler served in state government in Pennsylvania as the deputy secretary of agriculture. After entering Teachers College, Columbia University for doctoral studies in 1930, he was able to complete his coursework and oral examinations, but never completed his dissertation, as he was recruited to fill the position as president at Rhode Island State College in 1930 after the death of Howard Edwards.

Early in Bressler's presidential administration, the difficulties brought on by the Great Depression were becoming evident. In an effort to boost the college's prestige, Bressler hired Ukrainian emigre professor Igor Sikorski as a member of the mechanical engineering faculty to develop a program in aeronautical engineering. However this relatively expensive program did not last much beyond the Bressler presidency. Additionally, Bressler was responsible for development of the Narragansett Marine Laboratory in 1936 that would eventually become the nucleus for later development of URI's Graduate School of Oceanography. In most other program areas, Bressler responded by economizing where he could throughout the college and enrolling as many students as could be accommodated. Bressler felt that it would be better for young people who could not find jobs to be in college rather than be idle. Although Bressler kept costs as low as possible, summer jobs became nonexistent and the college had to raise its fees to compensate for reduced funding by the State Assembly. As a result, many students were unable to stay in school due to inadequate financial resources and enrollments fell into decline. Several buildings were constructed on campus largely using Works Progress Administration funds, including Quinn Hall, Eleanor Roosevelt Hall, and Green Hall, as well as Meade Stadium for the Rhode Island Rams football team.

== Death and legacy ==
Bressler died 9 May 1948 at South County Hospital in South Kingstown, Rhode Island, with his obituary noting his prominence in Rhode Island Democratic Party politics. Bressler's wife Sadie lived for several decades as a widow dying in Detroit, Michigan on 8 December 1983.

Bressler's son, Raymond George Bressler, Jr. (1911-1968), was a professor of agricultural economics at the University of Connecticut, who later served as a vice chancellor at the University of California, Berkeley. In 1950, Bressler Hall, a residence hall was opened on the Rhode Island State College Campus to house students in the post-World War II building boom on campus.

Academic offices
Preceded by Howard Edwards	President of Rhode Island State College; 1931-1940	Succeeded by Carl R. Woodward
