= Agricultural chemistry =

Agricultural sub-discipline of applied chemistry

2,4-D, an early synthetic herbicide inspired by the study of auxins, had a profound impact on crop yields, starting in the 1940s.

Agricultural chemistry is the chemistry, especially organic chemistry and biochemistry, as they relate to agriculture. Agricultural chemistry embraces the structures and chemical reactions relevant in the production, protection, and use of crops and livestock. Its applied science and technology aspects are directed towards increasing yields and improving quality, which comes with multiple advantages and disadvantages.

== Agricultural and environmental chemistry ==
This aspect of agricultural chemistry deals with the role of molecular chemistry in agriculture as well as the negative consequences.

=== Plant biochemistry ===
Plant biochemistry encompasses the chemical reactions that occur within plants. In principle, knowledge at a molecular level informs technologies for providing food. Particular focus is on the biochemical differences between plants and other organisms as well as the differences within the plant kingdom, such as dicotyledons vs monocotyledons, gymnosperms vs angiosperms, C2- vs C4-fixers, etc.

=== Pesticides ===
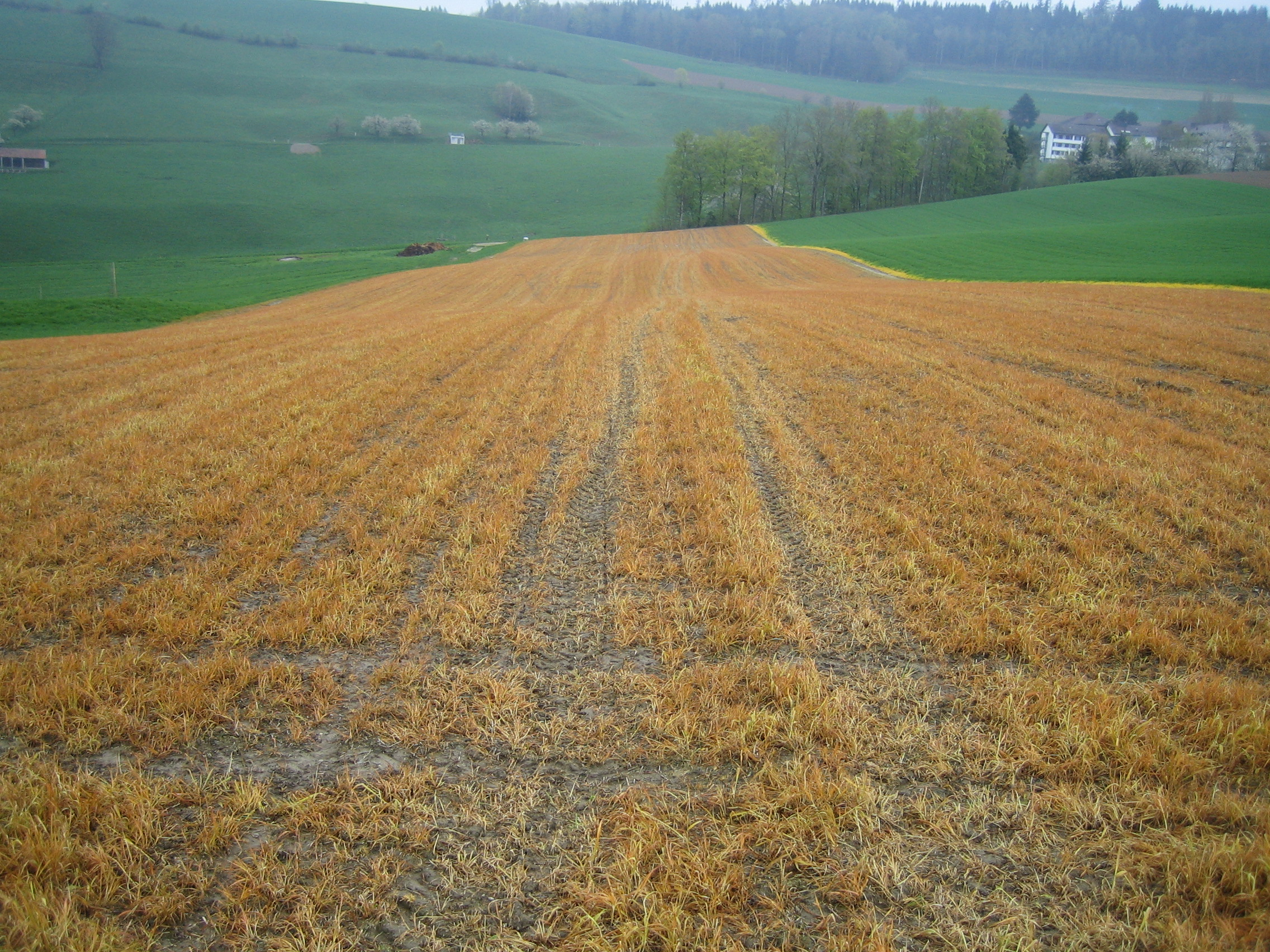
A field after application of a herbicide

Chemical materials developed to assist in the production of food, feed, and fiber include herbicides, insecticides, fungicides, and other pesticides. Pesticides are chemicals that play an important role in increasing crop yield and mitigating crop losses. These work to keep insects and other animals away from crops to allow them to grow undisturbed, effectively regulating pests and diseases.

Disadvantages of pesticides include contamination of the ground and water (see persistent organic pollutants). They may be toxic to non-target species, including birds, fish, pollinators, as well as the farmworkers themselves.

=== Soil chemistry ===
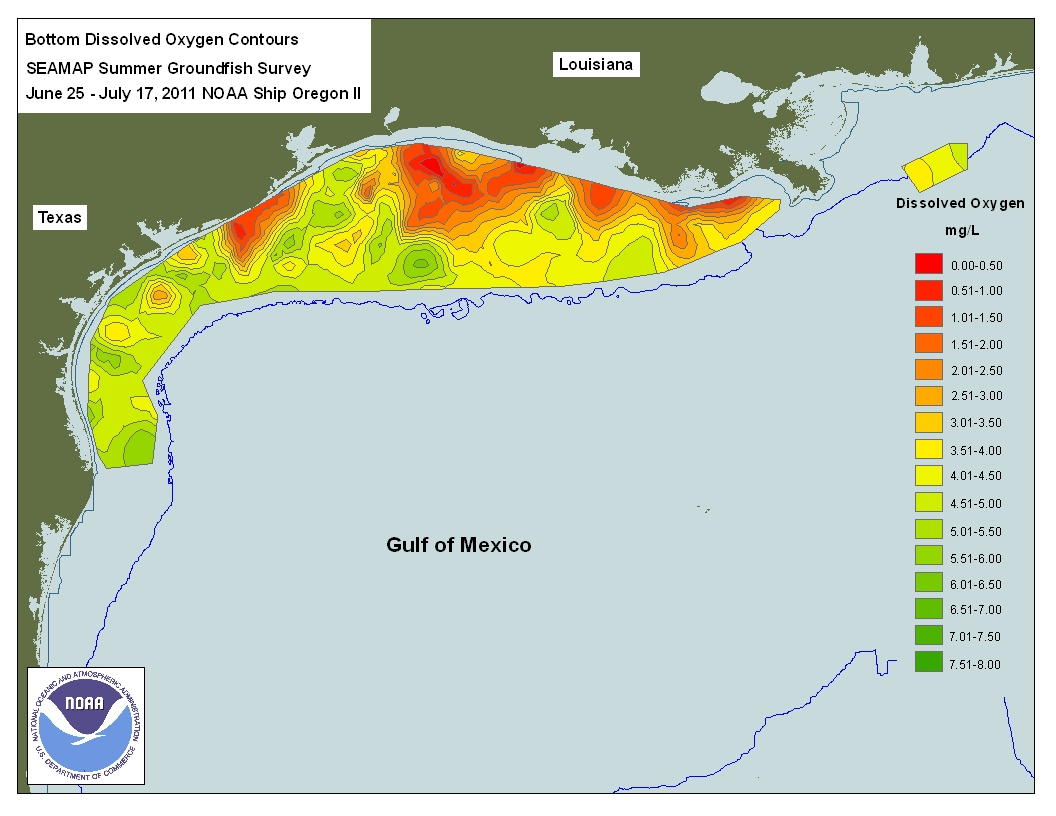
The "dead zone" in the Gulf of Mexico is caused by run-off of agricultural chemicals.

Agricultural chemistry often aims at preserving or increasing the fertility of soil with the goals of maintaining or improving the agricultural yield and improving the quality of the crop. Soils are analyzed with attention to the inorganic matter (minerals), which comprise most of the mass of dry soil, and organic matter, which consists of living organisms, their degradation products, humic acids and fulvic acids.

Fertilizers are a major consideration. While organic fertilizers are time-honored, their use has largely been displaced by chemicals produced from mining (phosphate rock) and the Haber-Bosch process. The use of these materials dramatically increased the rate at which crops are produced, which is able to support the growing human population. Common fertilizers include urea, ammonium sulphate, diammonium phosphate, and calcium ammonium phosphate.

== Biofuels and bio-derived materials ==
Pathways for producing biofuels from fat. The processes start with hydrogenation of backbone double bonds. Fatty acid methyl esters can then be produced by transesterification. Alternatively, C16 and C18 diesel fuels arise by hydrogenolysis of the saturated fat.

Agricultural chemistry encompasses the science and technology of producing not only edible crops, but feedstocks for fuels ("biofuels") and materials. Ethanol fuel obtained by fermentation of sugars. Biodiesel is derived from fats, both animal- and plant-derived. Methane can be recovered from manure and other ag wastes by microbial action. Lignocellulose is a promising precursor to new materials.

== Biotechnology ==
Structure of fructose (left), which is produced on a multi-billion-ton scale from glucose (right).

Biocatalysis is used to produce a number of food products. More than five billion tons of high fructose corn syrup are produced annually by the action of the immobilized enzyme glucose isomerase of corn-derived glucose. Emerging technologies are numerous, including enzymes for clarifying or debittering of fruit juices.

A variety of potentially useful chemicals are obtained by engineered plants. Bioremediation is a green route to biodegradation.

=== GMOs ===
Genetically Modified Organisms (GMO's) are plants or living things that have been altered at a genomic level by scientists to improve the organisms characteristics. These characteristics include providing new vaccines for humans, increasing nutrients supplies, and creating unique plastics. They may also be able to grow in climates that are typically not suitable for the original organism to grow in. Examples of GMO's include virus resistant tobacco and squash, delayed ripening tomatoes, and herbicide resistant soybeans.

GMO's came with an increased interest in using biotechnology to produce fertilizer and pesticides. Due to an increased market interest in biotechnology in the 1970s, there was more technology and infrastructure developed, a decreased cost, and an advance in research. Since the early 1980s, genetically-modified crops have been incorporated. Increased biotechnological work calls for the union of biology and chemistry to produce improved crops, a main reason behind this being the increasing amount of food needed to feed a growing population.

That being said, concerns with GMO's include potential antibiotic resistance from eating a GMO. There are also concerns about the long term effects on the human body since many GMO's were recently developed.

Much controversy surrounds GMO's. In the United States, all foods containing GMO's must be labeled as such.

=== Omics ===
Particularly relevant is proteomics as protein (nutrition) guides much of agriculture.

== See also ==
- Agronomy
- Food science
