= Howard Edwards =

American educator and college president (born 1854)

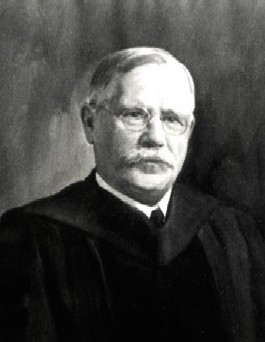
- Edwards ca. 1928
- Born: November 7, 1854; Fauquier County, Virginia, US
- Died: April 3, 1930 (aged 70); Kingston, Rhode Island, US
- Known for: Third president of University of Rhode Island
- Spouse: Elizabeth Mildred (Smith) Edwards (m. 1887)

Academic background
- Education: Randolph-Macon College (BA 1875, MA 1876); Leipzig University (1877–1878); Sorbonne (1891–1892); University of Arkansas (Ph.D. 1891); Brown University (LL.D. honoris causa 1914); Michigan State College (LL.D., honoris causa 1927)

Academic work
- Institutions: Bethel Military Academy (1878–1880); Bingham School (1880–1884); University of Arkansas (1885–1890); Michigan Agricultural College (1890–1906); Rhode Island College of Agriculture and Mechanic Arts/Rhode Island State College (president 1906–1930)

Howard Edwards (1854–1930) was an American educator with expertise in American literature and university administrator who served as the third president of the Rhode Island College of Agriculture and Mechanic Arts (the forerunner of the University of Rhode Island) from 1906 to 1930; at 24 years, he was the longest-serving president of the university.

== Early life and education ==
Edwards was born 7 November 1854, in Fauquier County, Virginia, to Rev. Francis Marion Edwards and Frances Lawson (Bland) Edwards. In 1875, Edwards earned his bachelor's degree (A.B.) at Randolph-Macon College, and a year later he earned his master's degree there. After graduation, he traveled to Europe and engaged in graduate studies at the University of Leipzig (1877–78). He earned his Ph.D. degree at the University of Arkansas in 1891, followed by postdoctoral studies at the Sorbonne (1891–1892). He married Elizabeth Mildred Smith, daughter of Anderson D. Smith and Susan (Norton) Smith, on January 5, 1881, in Fauquier County, Virginia.

== Academic career ==
Edwards' first academic appointment was as an instructor of literature at Bethel Military Academy in 1878, where he remained until 1880, when he joined the faculty of Bingham School, where he stayed until 1884. In 1885, he joined the faculty of the University of Arkansas and remained there until he completed his doctoral degree in 1891 and went on to postdoctoral studies in Europe. Between 1892 and 1906, Edwards taught at Michigan Agricultural College, where he met Kenyon Butterfield, who would become his predecessor in the presidency at Rhode Island College of Agriculture and Mechanical Arts. Upon the resignation of Butterfield in 1906 to assume the presidency of Massachusetts Agricultural College, Edwards was selected by the college's Board of Managers as the next president of the college.

Early in Edwards' presidential administration, he was faced with considerable opposition from members of the Rhode Island General Assembly who were reticent to support greater appropriations to expand the institution according to Edwards' plans. The controversy within the legislature led to a major legislative commission to study and recommend legislative actions toward the college. When the commission report was released in 1909, the general conclusion was that an expansion of academic programs would benefit the state, resulting in a considerable increase in appropriations and a change of the name of the college to Rhode Island State College to reflect its expanded role in public higher education in the state.

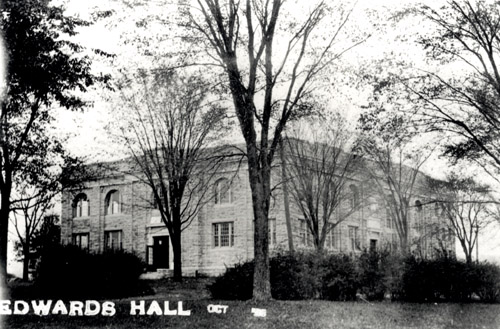
Edwards Auditorium, built in 1928, was named in honor of Howard Edwards.

Later in Edwards' presidency, several new buildings were constructed on campus, including Ranger, Washburn, Bliss, Edwards, and Lippitt Halls, that were located around the central quadrangle of the college originally designed by Frederick Law Olmsted, and the number of students increased from 250 to over 650 by the end of his tenure. The first gymnasium, Rodman Hall, was built to accommodate the sports programs. Home economics was introduced as a degree program in the college, women were admitted as students, the first master's degrees were awarded, and the fraternity system was established. Edwards died in office on April 3, 1930.

== Legacy ==
In 1928, a large lecture hall with a performance stage and theater seating was built on the central quadrangle of Rhode Island State College and named Edwards Auditorium in his honor.

Academic offices
Preceded by Kenyon L. Butterfield	President of University of Rhode Island; 1906-1930	Succeeded by Raymond G. Bressler, Sr.
