= Francis H. Horn =

American educator and college president (born 1908)

Francis Henry "Fran" Horn
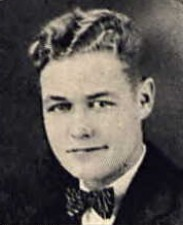
- Horn in 1926
- Born: November 18, 1908; Toledo, Ohio, US
- Died: January 11, 1999 (aged 90); South Kingstown, Rhode Island, US
- Known for: directorship or presidency of several colleges and universities in the United States, Switzerland, and the United Kingdom
- Spouse: Xenia Frances Beliavsky "Billie" Horn (m. 1935)
- Children: 3

Academic background
- Education: Dartmouth College (B.A. 1930, English); University of Virginia (M.A. 1934, English Literature); Yale University (M.A. 1942, Education; Ph.D. 1949 Education)

Academic work
- Institutions: The American University in Cairo (1930-1933); Junior College of Commerce (1936-1942); Johns Hopkins University (1946-1953); Pratt Institute (president 1953-1957); Southern Illinois University (1957-1958); University of Rhode Island (president 1958-1967); Commission on Independent Colleges and Universities of New York (1967-1968); Albertus Magnus College (president 1968-1970); Wagner College (executive vice president 1970-1972); American College of Switzerland (president 1972-1975); New England College (director British Branch at Arundel (1975-1983)

Francis Henry "Fran" Horn (November 18, 1908 – January 11, 1999) was an American educator with expertise in English literature and higher education who served as a university administrator at several institutions in the Eastern United States, and served as president of several colleges and universities, including the Pratt Institute from 1953 to 1957, the University of Rhode Island (URI) from 1958 to 1967, Albertus Magnus College from 1968 to 1970, and the American College of Switzerland from 1972 to 1975. While serving as president of the University of Rhode Island, he oversaw the founding of two graduate schools, the Graduate Library School and the Graduate School of Oceanography, as well as the establishment of the URI Faculty Senate, and he managed rapidly increasing student enrollments and ambitious building projects on the URI campus. Despite his success in guiding the numerous building projects and building the national and international reputation of the university, he fell into political disfavor with the university's board of trustees primarily for his political aspirations, leading to his forced resignation from URI in 1967. Horn was elected as a member of the Rhode Island Heritage Hall of Fame in 1967, and he spend his retirement years after 1983 at his home in Kingston near the URI campus.

== Early life and education ==
Fran Horn was born 16 Nov 1908, in Toledo, Ohio, to Henry Frederick Horn and Orpha Ford (Bennett) Horn. Horn attended public schools in Toledo, graduating from Libbey High School in 1926. He went on to further his education, first earning a B.A. degree in English at Dartmouth College in 1930. After being recruited by Charles A. Watson after graduation in 1930, Horn traveled to Cairo, Egypt and taught English and history at The American University in Cairo until 1933, when he returned to the United States to earn his M.A. in the English Literature at the University of Virginia in 1934. Horn married Russian émigré Xenia Frances Beliavsky "Billie" Horn on 8 June 1935 in New Haven. From 1935 to 1942, Horn was an assistant dean and taught at Junior College of Commerce in New Haven, Connecticut until 1942 when he earned his M.A. degree at Yale University, and he was drafted into the U.S. military for service during World War II. Horn served in the United States Navy during World War II as a sailor aboard the naval rescue tug ATR-70 and the USS Celeno (AK-76)

== Post World War II academic career ==
Horn's first post-war academic appointment was as dean of McCoy College (Evening Division) at Johns Hopkins University in Baltimore beginning in 1946. He continued on his Ph.D. studies at Yale during this time, completing his degree in 1949. Horn remained on the faculty of Johns Hopkins, becoming chair of the Department of Education in 1951. He remained in that position until 1953, when he assumed the presidency of Pratt Institute in Brooklyn, New York. After one year (1957–1958) as a distinguished visiting professor of education at Southern Illinois University, Horn was selected to be the sixth president of the University of Rhode Island on 1 July 1958. During Horn's nine years at the University of Rhode Island the University experience extraordinary growth in both enrollment and physical assets. A new library was constructed and opened in 1965. Two new graduate schools, the Graduate Library School and the Graduate School of Oceanography were established in the early 1960s. The Graduate School of Oceanography, in particular, at the helm of Dean John Knauss became internationally known and continues to be one of the university's most prominent programs. Additionally, a dental hygiene program, the Bureau of Government Research were all established in 1960. Additionally, academic freedom was a major issue on college campuses and Horn firmly supported the concept despite the criticism of those outside the University community, and he championed the formation of the URI Faculty Senate in 1960 as a means for improved academic governance. Those who perceived their power to be diminished by Horn or were offended by his administrative style made their disenchantment public. There resulted six weeks of extensive press coverage and Board of Trustee hearings over the issue before it was resolved generally in Horn's favor.

Horn was an enthusiastic proponent of civil rights during the 1960s, often at odds with traditional notions of college acting in loco parentis. In a 1962 letter to the Dean of Students, Horn expressed support of student activism in the realm of civil rights: "I regret I cannot agree with you that this Freedom Ride activity should be 'slowed down.' For almost the first time since I've been here at the University, students seem to have become interested enough in a matter beyond their own personal concerns to take some positive action. For years many college administrators, and I have to admit to being among them, have urged that students should get more excited about issues of consequence. I consider segregation to be one of these."

Two controversial issues which emerged in 1966 and 1967 that pitted Horn against the URI Board of Trustees ultimately leading to his resignation. The first of these was his contention that the state could not adequately support two major institutions of higher education, with a proposal to combine Rhode Island College and the university into one administrative entity based in Kingston. The second and more serious issue was Horn's decision to run for the Democratic nomination for the Congressional seat vacated by the death of Rep. John E. Fogarty. Horn's House of Representatives candidacy was short-lived, but it angered the Board of Trustees which asked for and received his resignation in early 1967. When he did resign in 1967, Horn cited his desire for the Board to consider the university merger proposal on its merits with both the URI and Rhode Island College presidencies vacant, but his proposal was never seriously considered by the Board of Trustees.

Shortly after his departure from URI, Horn was elected as a member of the Rhode Island Heritage Hall of Fame in 1967, and he remained active in academic administration and as an internationally respected scholar. He received a Fulbight Scholar Award for a year of teaching and research in Kenya, and he assumed the presidency of the Commission on Independent Colleges and Universities of New York (1967-1968). He later assumed the presidency of Albertus Magnus College (1968-1970), and later a post as executive vice president of Wagner College (1970-1972). From 1975 until his retirement in 1983, he moved to Europe to serve as president of the American College of Switzerland (1972-1975), and later as director of the British Branch of New England College at Arundel (1975-1983). Upon his retirement, Horn and his wife Billie returned to their home in Kingston, Rhode Island near the URI campus and they remained active in the local community.

== Death and legacy ==
Fran Horn died on 11 Jan 1999 in South Kingstown, Rhode Island, four years after his wife Billie.

In 1968, a year after his departure from the presidency, the Francis H. Horn Oceanographic Laboratory was dedicated in his honor on the URI Narragansett Bay Campus in Narragansett, Rhode Island.

Academic offices
Preceded by Carl R. Woodward	President of University of Rhode Island; 1958-1967	Succeeded by Werner A. Baum
